= Betty G. Bailey =

American female artist (1939–2019)

Betty Graveen Bailey
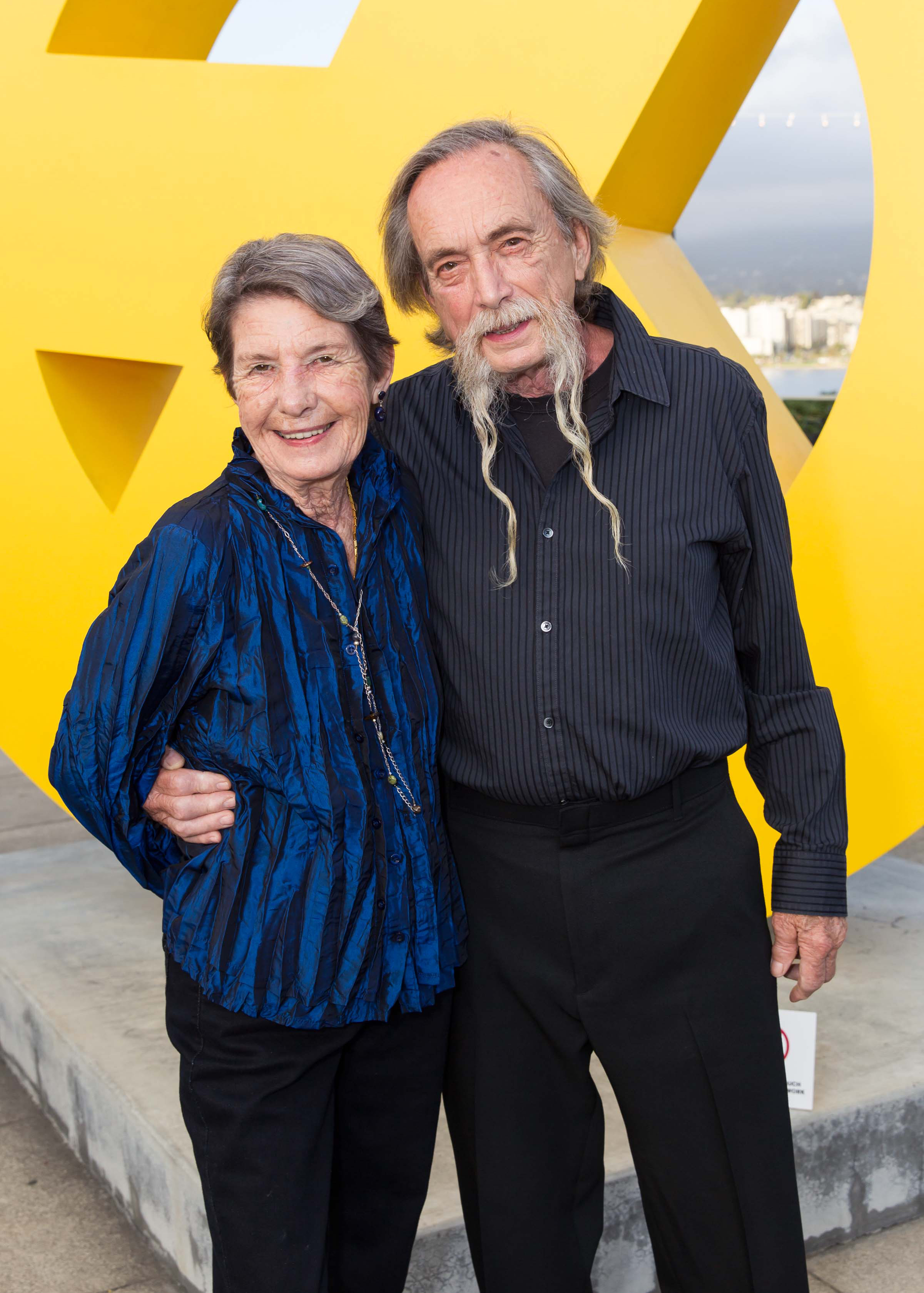
- Betty & Clayton Bailey at an opening at the Oakland Museum of California
- Born: Betty Joan Graveen; November 13, 1939; Antigo, Wisconsin
- Died: March 20, 2019 (aged 79); Port Costa, California
- Other names: Betty Bailey
- Known for: Drawing, Video Production, Ceramics, Baskets
- Movement: Funk art, Nut art, Outsider art
- Spouse: Clayton Bailey

Betty Graveen Bailey (née Betty Joan Graveen; November 13, 1939 – March 20, 2019) was an American multidisciplinary artist. She lived and worked in Contra Costa County, California, and was part of the Nut art movement.

== Artistic practice ==
Part of the loosely defined Nut art movement, Bailey, an untrained artist, practiced videography, ceramics, basket making and drawing. Later in life, Bailey primarily drew with watercolor pencil, working from memory. Her watercolor drawings feature figurative depictions of everyday life with humorous subtleties.

=== Videography ===
As a dedicated videographer and documentarian, Bailey maintained a large VHS collection of her own work and others, recording many art openings and exhibitions featuring many California artists including her husband Clayton Bailey, Joy Broom, Roy DeForest, Leta Ramos, Mel Ramos, M. Louise Stanley, Richard Shaw, Gerald Heffernan, Peter Saul, Creative Growth Art Center, Greg MacGregor, Fletcher Benton, Wayne Thiebaud, Jewel Bleckinger, Susan Subtle, The Port Costa Talent Show, H. C. Westermann, William T. Wiley, and others.

=== Exhibitions ===
Bailey's first show was in 1970 at the Candy Store Gallery in Folsom, California. Since then, she has shown throughout the United States.

In 2009, Bailey showed with her husband, Clayton Bailey, at the Richmond Art Center in Richmond, California in a show titled "Robots and watercolors."

In 2016, Bailey showed in New York City at U.S. Blues, Brooklyn alongside Daido Moriyama, Jacob Lawrence, Ficus Interfaith, Annabelle Speer, S. Clay Wilson, and Philip Evergood; as well as, at Feuer/Mesler Gallery in January 2017, alongside Andrew Brischler, Nick Payne, and Mason Saltarrelli.

In 2017, Bailey showed in Los Angeles at the Parker Gallery in a show titled 'Nut Art" alongside works by Robert Arneson, Clayton Bailey, Roy De Forest, David Gilhooly, Hannah Greely, Calvin Marcus, Maija Peeples-Bright, Benjamin Reiss, Peter Saul, Sally Saul, Harold Schlotzhauer, Richard Shaw, Irvin Tepper, Chris Unterseher and Franklin Williams.

Furthermore, in 2017, Bailey showed at the Atlanta Contemporary alongside Tyler Beard, Benjamin Butler, Nuno de Campos, Allison Evans, Matthew Fisher, Emilie Halpern, Grant Huang, Brad Kahlhamer, Joel Mesler, Caitlyn Murphy, Tessa Perutz, Eleanor Ray, Lisa Sanditz, and Mari Sunna.

Opening in November and running through the end of 2017, Bailey showed in Jam Session, with Johanna Billing at Et al. Gallery, San Francisco. Additionally, Bailey showed with Keith J. Varadi at NADA NYC in 2018 with the Et al. gallery.

== Bailey Art Museum ==
In 2013, Bailey and her husband, artist Clayton Bailey, founded the Bailey Art Museum in Crockett, California featuring their own art. The Bailey Art Museum was near the Bailey's residence and studio in Port Costa. The 3,200 square feet (300 m^{2}) space brought together works from across Clayton's five decades plus career featuring examples of Funk art, Nut art, ceramics, and metal sculpture (including robots and space guns), as well as pseudo-scientific curiosities by the artist's alter-ego Dr. Gladstone. The museum also included narrative watercolor drawings by Betty G. Bailey and a gift shop. The Bailey Art Museum closed in 2020.
