= Victor Cicansky =

Canadian sculptor (1935–2025)

Victor Cicansky CM SOM
- Born: February 12, 1935; Regina, Saskatchewan, Canada
- Died: March 3, 2025 (aged 90)
- Known for: Sculptor
- Movement: Regina Clay Movement
- Awards: Order of Canada (2009), Saskatchewan Order of Merit (1997), Saskatchewan Lieutenant-Governor's Award for Lifetime Achievement in the Arts (2012), Queen Elizabeth II Diamond Jubilee Medal (2012), Victoria and Albert Award for Ceramic Sculpture (1987)
- Website: Artist website

Victor Cicansky, CM SOM (February 12, 1935 – March 3, 2025) was a Canadian sculptor known for his witty narrative ceramics and bronze fruits and vegetables. A founder of the Regina Clay Movement, Cicansky combined a "wry sense of style" with a postmodern "aesthetic based on place and personal experience". In recognition of his work, Cicansky was appointed member of the Order of Canada (2009) and the Saskatchewan Order of Merit (1997), and was awarded the Saskatchewan Lieutenant-Governor's Award for Lifetime Achievement in the Arts (2012), the Queen Elizabeth II Diamond Jubilee Medal (2012), as well as the Victoria and Albert Award for Ceramic Sculpture (London UK, 1987).

== Early life and education ==
Victor Cicansky was born in Regina, Saskatchewan on February 12, 1935. The eldest son of Mary and Frank Cicansky (Czekanski) of Romanian descent, he grew up in the working-class neighborhood of Garlic Flats, known for its vegetable gardens. At age 16, he left school to work in construction, but later returned to graduate with a Bachelor of Education from University of Saskatchewan (1964), and Bachelor of Arts (1967) from the University of Regina. Hired by the Regina Board of Education he taught elementary and high school and studied ceramics under Beth Hone and Jack Sures at the Regina College School of Art in his spare time. In 1967 while attending a summer workshop at Haystack Mountain School of Crafts in Maine, Cicansky met Funk art sculptor Robert Arneson who convinced him to attend the University of California, Davis. There he met painter Roy De Forest and ceramist David Gilhooly and assimilated new ideas, styles and techniques. At Davis, Cicansky was awarded the Kingsley Annual Award for Sculpture (1969) and he graduated with a Master of Fine Arts in 1970. Cicansky then returned to Saskatchewan to teach art education at the University of Regina, and began to explore the imagery of his youth in figurative narrativion. In 1974, Cicansky moved "back to the land" and converted a former school in Craven into a studio.

== Art ==
Cicansky explored Prairie imagery – from fruit, vegetables and canning jars to outhouses and Volkswagens – in sculpture. Inspired by California Funk, his work included brightly painted figurative narratives with subjects – "characters rather than caricatures" – within architectural constructions described as "hard and rough, deliberately etched and maintaining the crude granularity of the reinforced clay." Other works reference art; his terra-cotta The Old Working Class-1 (Sturdy Stone Centre, Saskatoon) is a visual play on Van Gogh's Potato Eaters. His oeuvre also includes tables, benches or plates entwined with pear trees, grapevines and corn.

=== Regina Clay Movement (1968–1988) ===
Cicansky's first solo exhibition – held in 1968 at the Dunlop Art Gallery (Regina Public Library) – was followed by solo shows in 1970 at the University of California, Davis, and in 1973 at the Moose Jaw Art Museum. In January 1973, he also participated in the sculptural clay group exhibition held at the MacKenzie Art Gallery (University of Regina). This show caught the attention of the Canada Council for the Arts who selected Cicansky along with Joe Fafard, Russell Yuristy, and Marilyn Levine and Ann James for Canada Trajectoires ’73 in Paris, the first international exhibition of the Regina ceramists. In the following years this group exhibited across Canada and were known collectively as the Regina Clay Movement. Commissioned by the provincial government, Cicansky, Fafard, Yuristy, and David Thauberger, with Cicansky's father Frank and five other folk artists, created The Grain Bin for the 1976 Montreal Olympics. In 1977 and 1980, Cicansky's clay tableaux were selected to decorate the provincial government's Sturdy-Stone Centre in Saskatoon, an endorsement of Postmodernism and the Regina Clay Movement.

=== Public art ===
Cicansky's earliest works included many large-scale public art commissions, including the murals The Old Working Class and The New Working Class for the Sturdy Stone Centre (1978–81), The Garden Fence for the CBC building in Regina (1981–84), as well as Regina: My World (1979) for The Co-operators (1979). He created the bronze The Garden of the Mind at the College of Agriculture in Saskatoon (1992) as well as a gateway sculpture and gazebo art piece for the Grow Regina Community Gardens (2009). In 1989 Cicansky was also commissioned to create a gift, presented by Premier Grant Devine, to the Duke and Duchess of York. That year Cicansky moved back to Regina.

=== Major exhibitions ===
Cicansky and the Regina ceramists drew international attention at Canada Trajectoires ’73 held at the Musée d’art moderne de la Ville de Paris, and national interest following exhibitions at the Art Gallery of Ontario (1973), Art Gallery of Greater Victoria (1974), Alberta College of Art Gallery (1976) Dalhousie Art Gallery (1976), Southern Alberta Art Gallery (1977), and the Saskatchewan-California ceramic exchanges (1980) at the MacKenzie Art Gallery and Dunlop Art Gallery. In the following decade Cicansky's work was exhibited with the Regina ceramists at the London Regional Art Gallery (now Museum London) (1982), Glenbow Museum (1984), at Saskatchewan Arts and Crafts exposition in Jilin, China (1985), Art Gallery of Nova Scotia (1987), Mendel Art Gallery (1989), as well as in the 2006 touring exhibition Regina Clay: Worlds in the Making curated by Timothy Long. In 1983 a solo exhibition of his work Victor Cicansky: Clay Sculpture, mounted by the MacKenzie Art Gallery, toured the Glenbow Museum, Kitchener-Waterloo Art Gallery, Mendel Art Gallery, and the Swift Current National Exhibition Centre. Throughout his career, solo exhibitions of his work were held at Mira Godard Gallery (Toronto), Galerie de Bellefeuille (Montreal), Slate Fine Art Gallery (Regina), and Douglas Udell Gallery (Edmonton). A prolific artist, Cicansky also exhibited at Masters Gallery (Calgary) and at Art Fairs across North America. Cicansky continued to live and work in Regina.

In 2019, the MacKenzie Art Gallery debuted Victor Cicansky: The Gardener's Universe, a touring retrospective exhibition which brought together over 100 of his works. A film was made at that time about him. The film was shown in the gallery again in 2025 in honour of his life and death.

== Selected public collections ==
Cicansky's work is found in the National Gallery of Canada (Ottawa ON), Gardiner Museum (Toronto ON), Burlington Art Centre, Confederation Centre Art Gallery (Charlottetown PE), Montreal Museum of Fine Arts, Musée d'art contemporain de Montréal, and the National Museum of Modern Art, Kyoto (Japan).

== Recognition and contribution ==
Throughout his career Cicansky was recognized for his unique iconography and aesthetic. Described as "non-elitist" and a "celebration of the harvest" by curator Bruce Ferguson, his work reflects his upbringing, love of gardening and opposition to urban "disdain of anything small." For Ferguson, Cicansky's tableaux, The Old Working Class and The New Working Class reflects a concern for local histories and "Prairie socialism". At the time of his solo exhibition at the Glenbow Museum in Calgary, journalist Nancy Tousley wrote: "These works are about place, but they take a slightly distanced view — their knowing humour is benevolent but satirical, it hovers outside or above the depicted scenario." Curator Timothy Long wrote that his fusion of art references with childhood memories, a "riotous marriage of high and low culture"... "results in a wry prairie humour which is uniquely Cicansky's." As curator of the exhibition Regina Clay: World in the Making, Long also noted that the Regina ceramists were "among the first in Canada to win respect for ceramics as a sculptural medium.... Their assertion of the importance of place aligned them with the emerging postmodern concern for locality and they struck a chord with the popular imagination at a moment when the back-to-the-land movement was at its zenith." Although representative of an era, for Dunlop Gallery curator Wayne Morgan: "The stories told by the main clay artists during this period — Cicansky, Fafard, Levine, Thauberger and Yuristy — remain true today and are still important."

In recognition for his artistic achievement, Cicansky was awarded the Victoria and Albert Award for Ceramic Sculpture (1987), the Saskatchewan Order of Merit (1996), the Saskatchewan Lieutenant-Governor's Award for Lifetime Achievement in the Arts (2012). and the Queen Elizabeth II Diamond Jubilee Medal (2012). In 2009 he was named a member of the Order of Canada for his contribution as an artist and educator. Cicansky taught at the University of California at Davis (1968–70), Banff Centre for the Arts (1972), Nova Scotia College of Art and Design (1973), and at the University of Regina's Faculty of Education (1970–84) and Visual Arts Department (1984–93). He retired as Professor Emeritus in 1994 and, in 2007, was awarded an Honorary Doctorate of Fine Arts from the University of Regina. In 2004 a book on his life and work written by Donald Kerr, The Garden of Art: Vic Cicansky, Sculptor, was published.

Cicansky died on March 3, 2025, at the age of 90.

== Publications ==
- Nut Pot Bag or Clay Without Tears (artist book). Authored by Jim Adamson, Robert Arneson, Clayton Bailey, Fred Bauer, Maija Peeples-Bright, Victor Cicansky, David Gilhooly, Jim Melchert, Nicholas Stephens, Chris Unterseher, Peter Vandenberge, David Zack, Lowell Darling. University of California, Davis. 1971.
- Up From Garlic Flats (book). Authored by Victor Cicansky. RADIANT Press. 2019. ISBN 9781989274149.
