= Candy Store Gallery =

Coordinates: 38.6782°N 121.1755°W

- Established: 1962
- Dissolved: 1992
- Location: Folsom, California
- Type: art gallery
- Key holdings: Funk artists of Northern California, USA
- Founder: Adeliza McHugh

The Candy Store Gallery (from 1962 to 1992) introduced many important artists and styles of art, and was a leading showcase for the Funk artists of Northern California, United States.

== History ==
Located in a commercial building at 605 Sutter Street in downtown Folsom, California, the Candy Store Gallery previously served as a library and candy store, before becoming the personal residence of Adeliza McHugh, who founded the gallery in order to showcase the works of regional artists whom she admired. Despite having no formal art background, McHugh was instrumental in introducing many artists that would go on to achieve national, and in some cases, international reputations including James Albertson, Robert Arneson, Clayton Bailey, Roy De Forest, David Gilhooly, Irv Marcus, Maija Peeples-Bright, Peter VandenBerge, Camille VandenBerge, and William T. Wiley.

By way of various group exhibitions, the gallery also played an important role in defining, and promoting, Funk art and Nut art.

The Candy Store Gallery began in 1962 when McHugh was stopped by the local health department from continuing to sell homemade confections, (specifically almond nougat treats).

Despite its relatively small size (just two rooms), the gallery gained wide attention from critics and collectors, including a much publicized visit in 1970 by art collector and actor Vincent Price. Although many of the artists given their starts at the gallery went on to bigger venues, most remained loyal to McHugh and continued to exhibit, and sell work, through the gallery. In recognition of the gallery's contributions, it was honored in 1981 by an attendance record-breaking exhibition at Sacramento's Crocker Art Museum titled "Welcome to the Candy Store."

The gallery closed in 1992, and McHugh died in 2003 at age 91.
