= Stephen Kaltenbach =

American artist (born 1940)

- Born: 1940 (age 85–86); Battle Creek, Michigan, U.S.
- Education: University of California, Davis
- Known for: painting, sculpture, conceptual art
- Movement: Conceptual art, Post-minimalism
- Awards: National Endowment for the Arts Fellowship; 1977-78; Guggenheim Fellowship; 1978-79

Stephen J. Kaltenbach (born 1940) is an American artist and author based in Sacramento, California.

== Early life and education ==
Kaltenbach was born in Battle Creek, Michigan. He attended the University of California, Davis between 1963 and 1967, earning a B.A. and M.A. At UC Davis, Kaltenbach studied alongside notable artists including David Gilhooly, Richard Shaw and Bruce Nauman.

== Career ==
After graduating, Kaltenbach spent three years in New York City, producing paintings and a variety of conceptual work including bronze time capsules, graffiti, sidewalk plaques and hoax advertisements. He exhibited alongside Richard Serra, Eva Hesse, Alan Saret and Bruce Nauman at the Leo Castelli Gallery show "Nine" in 1968, and had a solo exhibition at the Whitney Museum of American Art in 1969.

In 1970 Kaltenbach left the New York contemporary art world and returned to California, taking up a position at California State University, Sacramento where he taught until 2005. Kaltenbach chose to refashion his practice in California, abandoning public conceptual work and instead adopting the persona of a "Regional Artist" with a focus on figurative sculpture and portraiture.

Kaltenbach has also produced public art pieces for the city of Sacramento.

A retrospective of his career entitled 'Kaltenbach: The Beginning and The End' was exhibited at the Manetti Shrem Museum of Art at UC Davis in 2020.

== Notable works ==
Kaltenbach remains best known for the conceptual work he produced in the late 1960s, with recent exhibitions of his bronze time capsules and other pieces from that era.

His most notable painting is Portrait of my Father (1972–79), on display at the Crocker Art Museum in Sacramento, California.

He is also known for work inspired by a found object known as the "Slant Step" which was discovered by William T. Wiley and Bruce Nauman. He has produced drawings, sculptures, films and other work related to the step, most notably Slant Step 2, now in the collection of the Museum of Modern Art.

== Public collections ==
Kaltenbach's work is part of a number of public collections, including the Museum of Modern Art, the National Gallery of Art, the Crocker Art Museum, the Walker Art Center and the Kröller-Müller Museum.
