= Clayton Bailey =

American artist (1939–2020)

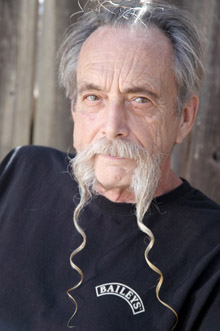
- Bailey in 2014
- Born: 9 March 1939; Antigo, Wisconsin
- Died: 6 June 2020 (aged 81); Port Costa, California
- Education: University of Wisconsin–Madison, B.S., 1961 M.S., 1962
- Known for: Sculpture, Ceramics, Performance
- Movement: Funk art, Nut art
- Spouse: Betty Joan Graveen
- Children: 2
- Awards: National Endowment for the Arts Recipient 1979 & 1990; Fellow National Council on Education in Ceramic Arts (1982); "Golden Bear Artist of the Year" Award and Commendation from the California Arts Council and the Lt. Governor of the State of California (2009)

Clayton George Bailey (March 9, 1939 – June 6, 2020), was an American artist who worked primarily in the mediums of ceramic and metal sculpture.

== Early life and education ==
Clayton George Bailey was born on March 9, 1939, in Antigo, Wisconsin. In middle school he met his future wife, artist Betty Joan Graveen (Betty G. Bailey).

Bailey attended the University of Wisconsin–Madison, where he received a B.S. degree in 1961, followed by an M.S. in Art and Art Education in 1962. In 1962, Bailey served as a technical assistant to Harvey Littleton, who was conducting glassblowing seminars at the Toledo Museum of Art.

== Career ==
Over the next five years, Bailey traveled the country accepting invitations to teach, from the People's Art Center in St. Louis, Missouri to positions with the University of Iowa, and the University of South Dakota. During this period Bailey received a Louis Comfort Tiffany grant (1963), and was appointed artist-in-residence at University of Wisconsin–Whitewater, where he taught ceramics for the following three years.

At the request of Robert Arneson, Bailey taught Arneson's classes at the University of California, Davis while Arneson was on sabbatical in 1967. In 1968, Bailey relocated to northern California, where he became a leading figure in the ceramic vein of the regional Funk art movement, pioneered by Arneson. Much of the Funk art activity was centered around UC Davis, where other prominent figures in the movement (Roy De Forest, Manuel Neri, William T. Wiley, David Gilhooly, Chris Unterseher, Margaret Dodd) either taught, or attended classes.

A leading venue for exhibiting Funk art was at the Candy Store Gallery, located in nearby Folsom, California, where Bailey would regularly present work in the context of both solo and group shows.

In 1968, Bailey began teaching at California State University, Hayward (now California State University, East Bay). He retired from this position in June 1996, with the title of Professor Emeritus of Ceramics.

Bailey became an ordained minister of the Universal Life Church in 1969, then formed The First Psychoceramic Church with headquarters in the Dairyville Cafe in Crockett, California. His church was created for the purpose of disseminating crackpot ideas (and performing the occasional marriage ceremony).

In 1970, Bailey established a home-studio space in rural Port Costa, California, where he became neighbors with fellow artist Roy De Forest. The two collaborated on numerous projects, and remained friends until De Forest's death in 2007.

Overlapping the Funk art movement was Nut art, a term coined by De Forest, which brought together many of the same practitioners including Arneson, De Forest, and Gilhooly, along with Peter Saul, Jerry Gooch, Victor Cicanski, Richard Shaw, David Zack. In 1972, Bailey co-curated the first-ever Nut art show at California State University, Hayward.

Stylistically, Bailey's work bridged several different categories and styles including Funk art, Nut art, ceramic and metallic sculpture, and Performance art. A recurring thread through all his work is humor, along with a high degree of craftsmanship.

Another track for artistic expression developed with the creation of Bailey's alter ego Dr. George Gladstone, beginning in 1969. Initially, the works blended performance and creations based on pseudo-science and personal mythologies. Works included the creation of fossilized remains (usually ceramic or from earth materials) and the classification of a new time period, the Pre-Credulous Era, the source of such Kaolithic curiosities as a cyclops skull and a Bigfoot skeleton. Dressed in a lab coat and pith helmet, Bailey as Dr. Gladstone performed excavations and staged performances and pranks. The World of Wonders, a traveling museum dedicated to Dr. Gladstone's life and work was developed, and presented in various venues, beginning with the Richmond Art Center. In 1976, the Wonders of the World Museum opened in downtown Port Costa, where it became a local tourist attraction until its closure in 1978. The collection is now split between Bailey's home-studio, and the Bailey Art Museum in downtown Crockett, California.

Over the years, the Dr. Gladstone character evolved into something more akin to a mad scientist, allowing Bailey to explore other forms of art with pseudo-scientific origins and associations. Most notable have been sculptures based on robots, beginning in the late 1970s and continuing on to today, although this work is now presented, and credited as Bailey's, not Dr. Gladstone's. The latest offshoot of the metallic sculpture (built from found materials and objects) had been a series of Space Guns.

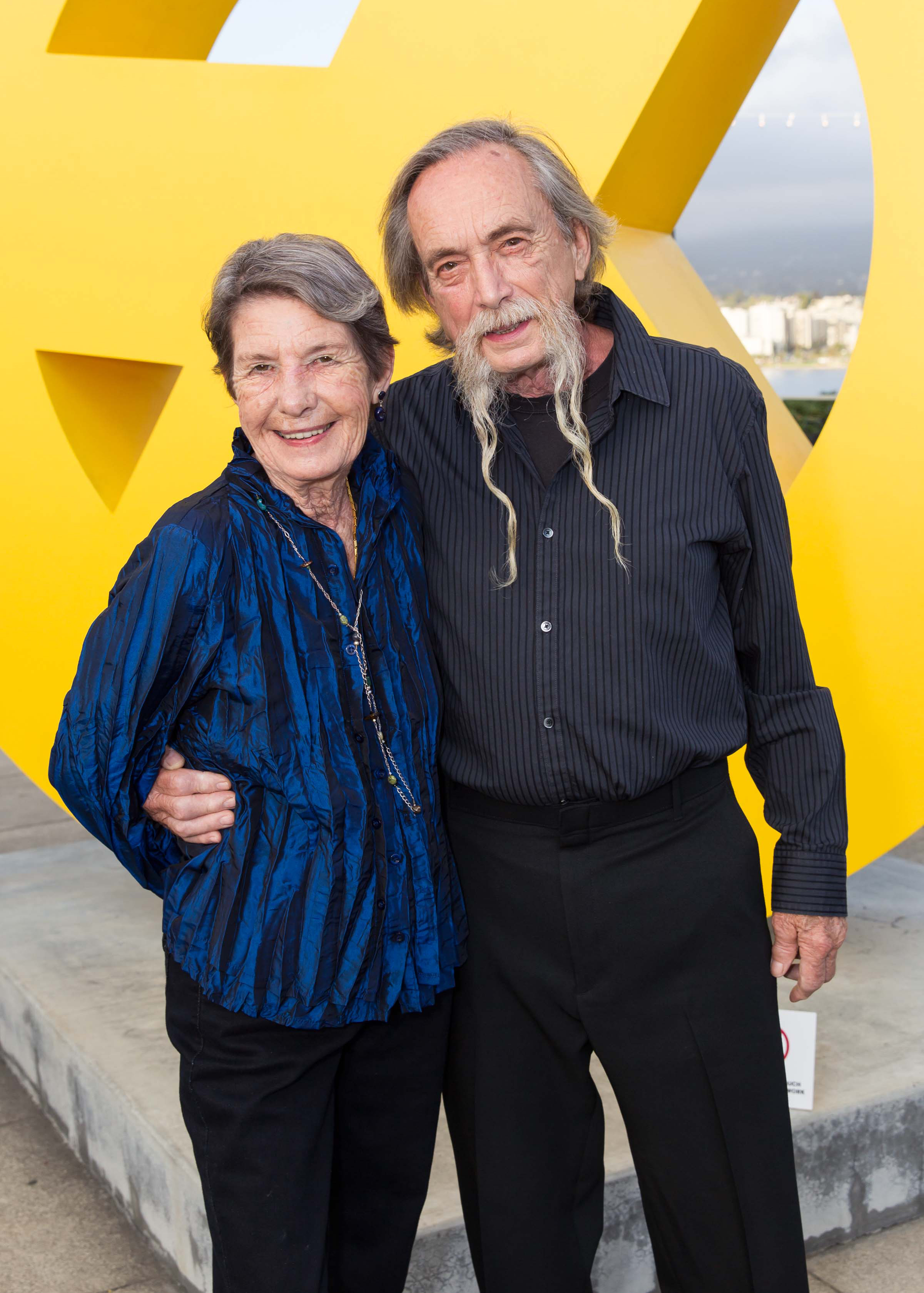
Betty G. Bailey and Clayton Bailey (2014) at the Peace Terrace in Oakland, California

In 1974, Bailey was profiled in Esquire Magazine as Dr. Gladstone. In the article written by Susan Subtle, "Their Arts Belong to Dada", Bailey was featured alongside artists Lowell Darling, Anna Banana, Ant Farm, Futzie Nutzle, Dr. Brute & Lady Brute, Mr. Peanut, Irene Dogmatic, AA Bronson, Captain Video, Flakey Rose Hip, Henry Humble, The Gluers and Dickens Bascom, Don and Rae Davis, and T.R. Uthco.

Bailey continued to work in a variety of mediums and styles until his death. Throughout his career as an artist, Bailey exhibited regularly throughout the United States, Europe, and Asia in both solo and group exhibitions. In 2011, Bailey was honored with a 50-year retrospective exhibition (Clayton Bailey's World of Wonders) at the Crocker Art Museum in Sacramento, California.

Bailey and his wife, fellow artist Betty G. Bailey, resided in Port Costa, California from 1970 until their deaths. Betty died on March 20, 2019. Bailey died at his Port Costa home on June 6, 2020. His health had deteriorated after a stroke in 2019.

== Clayton Bailey World of Wonders Art Museum ==
In 2013, Bailey and his wife, artist Betty G. Bailey, founded the Bailey Art Museum in Crockett, California. The Bailey Art Museum is near the Bailey's former home and studio in Port Costa. The 3,200 square feet (300 m^{2}) space brings together works from across the artist's five decades plus career featuring examples of Funk art, Nut art, ceramics, and metal sculpture (including robots and space guns), as well as pseudo-scientific curiosities by the artist's alter-ego Dr. Gladstone. The museum also includes narrative watercolor drawings by Betty G. Bailey and a gift shop.

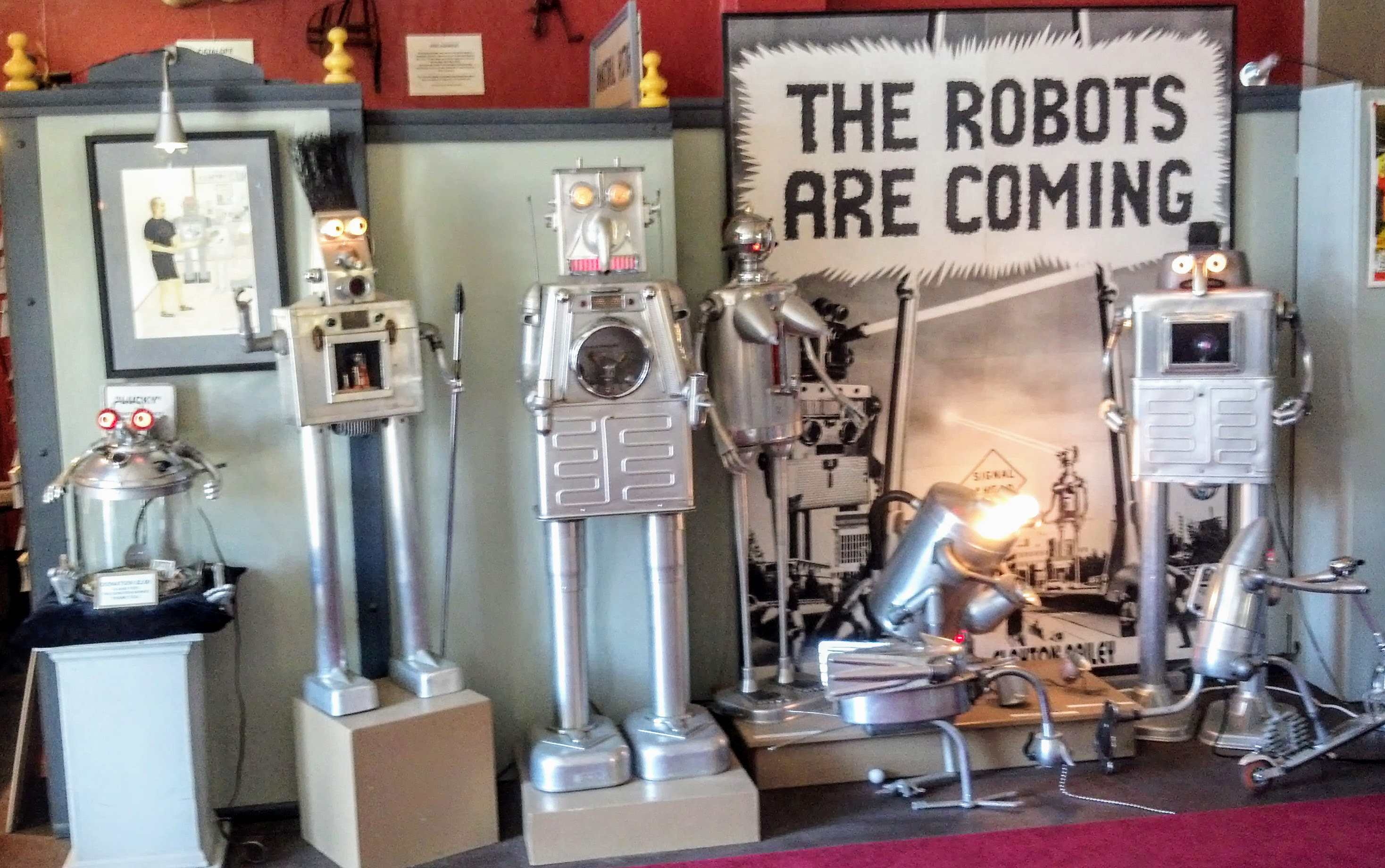
Robot exhibit at the Bailey Art Museum

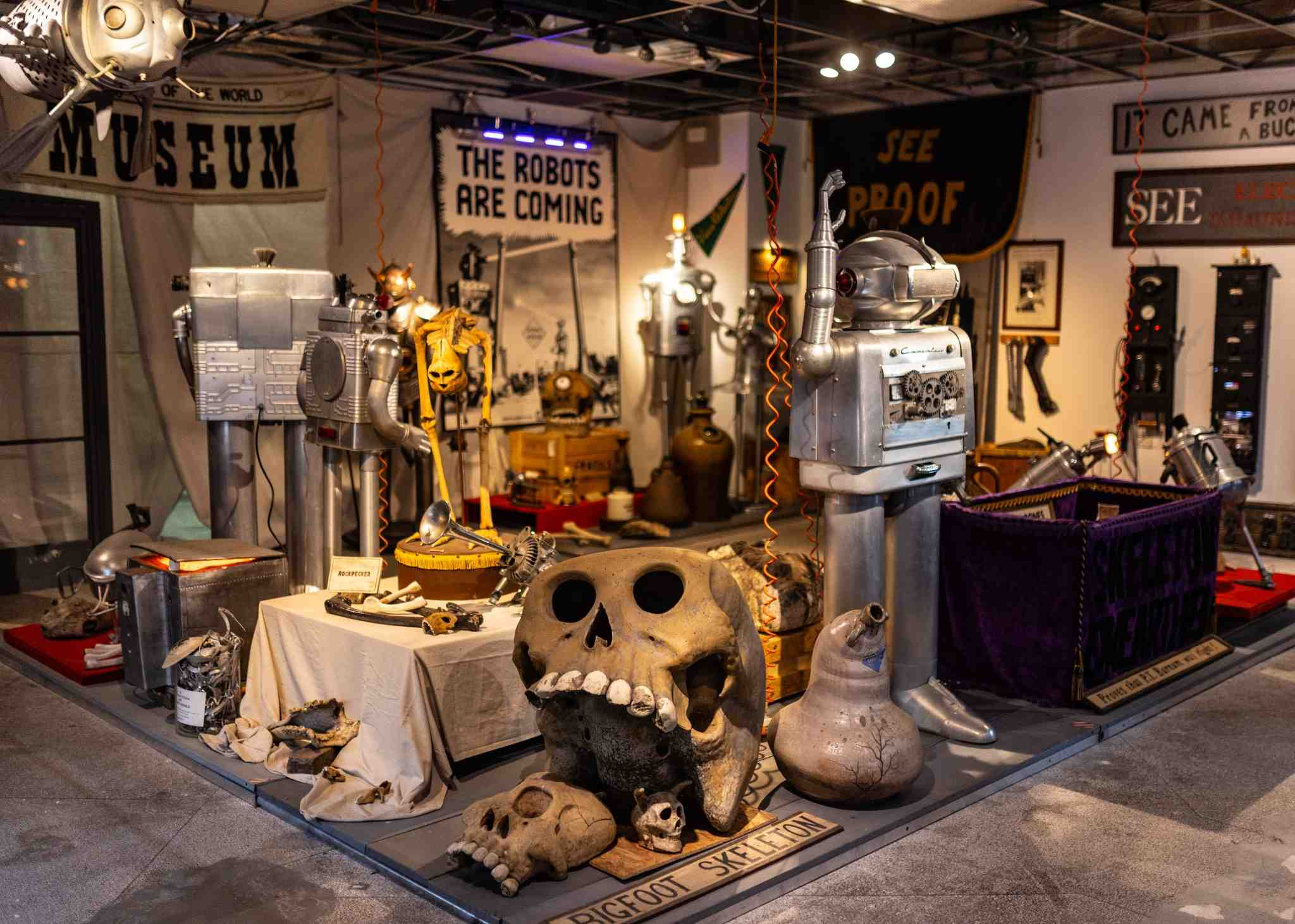
Clayton Bailey World of Wonders Museum Sculptures

In 2021, a significant collection of Clayton Bailey’s work was acquired by Curated Storefront, a nonprofit arts organization, through his daughter, Robin. Curated Storefront, known for refurbishing empty storefronts with public art installations, founded an open-access art museum dedicated to Bailey’s work in downtown Akron, Ohio, housed in the University of Akron. The museum, holding the largest collection of Bailey's work in the world, also includes an interactive exhibition and a gift shop. The exhibition site closed on August 1, 2026. A new location for the collection will be announced.

== Awards and honors ==
- 1963 – American Craft Council Grant
- 1963 – Louis Comfort Tiffany Foundation Grant
- 1979 – National Endowment for the Arts Grant Recipient
- 1982 – National Council on Education for the Ceramic Arts, Fellow of the Council
- 1984 – U.S. Patent #4440390 awarded for a "Novelty Cup for Forcibly Ejecting Liquid."
- 1990 – Panelist, California Arts Council, Artists Fellowship Program
- 1990 – National Endowment for the Arts Grant Recipient
- 1998 – Celestial Seasonings, Inc. "A Loose Interpretation III," Boulder, CO, Received Honorable Mention for creation of Celeste, the Robot Teabag
- 2009 – "Golden Bear Artist of the Year" Award and Commendation from the California Arts Council and the Lt. Governor of the State of California
- 2018 – National Council on Education for the Ceramic Arts, Honorary Member

== Public collections ==
Selected Public Collections

- Addison Gallery of American Art, Andover, Massachusetts
- Arizona State University Art Museum, Tempe, Arizona
- Asahi Shimbun, Tokyo, Japan
- Bakken Museum and Library, Minneapolis, Minnesota
- Carborundum Museum of American Ceramics. Niagara Falls, New York
- Curated Storefront. Akron, OH
- Crocker Art Museum, Sacramento, California
- Delaware Art Museum, Wilmington, Delaware
- DeYoung Museum, San Francisco, California
- di Rosa Art Preserve. Napa, California
- Elvehjem Museum of Art, University of Wisconsin, Madison, Wisconsin
- Everson Museum of Art, Syracuse, New York
- Fresno Art Museum, Fresno, California
- Harrison Museum of Art, Logan, Utah
- Henry Art Gallery, University of Washington, Seattle, Washington
- Hokkoku Shinbun, Korinbo, Japan
- Honolulu Museum of Art, Honolulu, Hawaii
- Illinois State University, Normal, Illinois
- Johnson Foundation, Racine, Wisconsin
- Katzen Museum, American University, Washington, D.C.
- Kohler Company, Kohler, Wisconsin
- Karstadt, Munich, Germany
- Metromedia Corp., Los Angeles, California
- Laguna Art Museum, Laguna Beach, California
- Leslie Ceramic Supply, Berkeley, California
- Los Angeles County Museum of Art, Los Angeles, California
- Mills College, Oakland, California
- Milwaukee Art Museum, Milwaukee, Wisconsin
- Mint Museum of Craft and Design, Charlotte, North Carolina
- Museum of Arts and Design - New York City
- Museum of Contemporary Art, Honolulu, Hawaii
- Museum of Contemporary Crafts, New York, New York
- Museum of Fine Arts, Houston, Texas
- Muskingum College, Muskingum, Ohio
- Nickle Arts Museum, University of Calgary, Alberta, Canada
- Oakland Museum of California, Oakland, California
- Racine Museum of Fine Arts, Racine, Wisconsin
- Redding Museum, Redding, California
- Renwick Gallery, Smithsonian Museum, Washington, D.C.
- Rhinelander Chamber of Commerce, Rhinelander, Wisconsin
- Richard Nelson Gallery, University of California, Davis, California
- SacRT light rail, 16th Street station (Commissioned Pavement Tiles)
- Sacramento State University, Sacramento, California
- San Francisco Museum of Modern Art, San Francisco, California
- San Jose Museum of Art, San Jose, California
- Shasta College, Redding, California
- Stanford University, Cantor Center for Visual Arts, Palo Alto, California
- University of Iowa, Iowa City, Iowa
- University of North Dakota, Grand Forks, North Dakota
- University of Oklahoma, Norman, Oklahoma
- University of Wisconsin, Madison, Wisconsin
- United States Information Agency, (USIA)

== Publications ==
- Nut Pot Bag or Clay Without Tears (artist book). Authored by Jim Adamson, Robert Arneson, Clayton Bailey, Fred Bauer, Maija Peeples-Bright, Victor Cicansky, David Gilhooly, Jim Melchert, Nicholas Stephens, Chris Unterseher, Peter Vandenberge, David Zack, Lowell Darling. University of California, Davis. 1971.
