= Nut Art =

Art movement

Nut Art exhibition catalog, California State University, Hayward, 1972. Cover by Roy De Forest.

The Nut Art movement was an artistic movement centered in Northern California, that flourished primarily in the late-1960s and early-1970s.

== History ==
The term "Nut Art" was coined by artist Roy De Forest (in conversation with writer David Zack) to describe an approach to art making which embraced humor along with the phantasmagorical. According to De Forest, Nut artists sought to create fantasy worlds reflective of their own quirks and eccentricities. As such, Nut Art placed a high degree of emphasis on evolving visions, of which specific artworks were produced as part of the ongoing process of self-definition, or in service to creating new personas and personal mythologies. (Among these personas was that of Ralph "Doggy" Dinsmore, a persona used by De Forest.)

As with Conceptual art, the idea or underlying concept with Nut Art was paramount. As a result, the creation of the Nut artist was not restricted by style or medium, allowing the movement to embrace emerging formats such as performance, text pieces, and appropriation, in addition to more traditional two and three dimensional mediums such as drawing, photography, and sculpture. Because of the emphasis on concept and satire, Nut Art welcomed contributions from participants without formal artistic backgrounds as well as those with advanced technical skill and training. Nut Art also reflected the importance of process over product, which had been a central tenet of the Action painters a generation previous.

Besides De Forest, other key practitioners of Nut Art included Robert Arneson, Clayton Bailey (as well as Bailey's alter-ego Dr. Gladstone), Victor Cicansky (alter-ego Victor Ceramski), Robert Cumming, Lowell Darling, Betty G. Bailey, Jack Ford, David Gilhooly, Jerry Gooch, Linda Renner, Peter Saul, Sally Saul, Harold Schlotzhauer, Richard Shaw, Irv Tepper, Chris Unterseher, Peter VandenBerge, Franklin Williams, Maija Zack (alter-ego Maija Woof), and David Zack.

David Zack, who was both a poet and an art critic, reviewed many of the group's exhibitions.

The first major exhibition of Nut Art took place in 1972 at the University Art Gallery of California State University, Hayward. The show was co-curated by Clayton Bailey (then art faculty) and Gallery Director Irene Keil. The show produced a catalog which included a preface written by De Forest.
