= Maija Peeples-Bright =

Latvian-American-Canadian artist

- Born: Maijiā Ģēģeris; 1942 (age 83–84); Riga, Latvian Soviet Socialist Republic
- Other names: Maija Gegeris, Maija Zack, Maija Woof, Maija Bright, Maija Peeples
- Education: University of California, Davis
- Spouse(s): David Zack (m. 1965–?), Earl Peeples (m. 1972–1999; death), Bill Bright (m. 2000–2015; death)

Maija Peeples-Bright (née Maija Gegeris; born 1942) is a Latvian-born American and Canadian painter, ceramist, and arts educator. She is known as one of the pioneers of the Funk art movement in the San Francisco Bay Area in the 1960s. Maija Peeples-Bright has gone by the names Maija Zack, Maija Woof, Maija Bright, and Maija Peeples.

== Early life and education ==
Maija Gegeris was born in 1942 in Riga, Latvian Soviet Socialist Republic (now Latvia). In 1945, the town she lived in was occupied by Nazi Germany and was bombed during the Soviet invasion. She and her family fled to Germany, where they were forced into German refugee camps from the time she was three years old to the time she was eight years old. In 1950, she and her family immigrated to the United States, settling near Sacramento, California.

Peeples-Bright attended high school in Sacramento, California; she then enrolled at the University of California, Davis in 1960, originally majoring in mathematics. After learning she needed an art class to meet General Education requirements, she enrolled in her first art class, taught by William T. Wiley. She then changed her major to art and went on to pursue a bachelor's degree in art. Wayne Thiebaud became her graduate advisor; she finished her master's degree at UC Davis in 1965. While there, she took classes with Robert Arneson whom she later befriended, as well as Roy De Forest and David Gilhooly.

== Career ==
In 1965, Peeples-Bright had her first exhibition, held at the Candy Store Gallery located in Folsom, California, a small city near Sacramento. The gallery was founded in 1962 by Adeliza McHugh, and it was important to the Funk art and Nut art movements (in the 1960s and 1970s). Many of the early artists within these art moments were connected to University of California, Davis. Peeples-Bright showed at Candy Store Gallery regularly throughout the three decades it was open; along with Robert Arneson, Roy De Forest, David Gilhooly, Clayton Bailey, and Peter VandenBerge, among others. In 2022, the Crocker Art Museum will hold a group exhibition about the Candy Store Gallery titled, The Candy Store: Funk, Nut and Other Art With A Kick, and features work by Peeples-Bright.

In 1965, Peeples-Bright and her husband David Zack, an artist and professor at the San Francisco Art Institute, bought the Iverson House (1888) on 908 Steiner Street in the Haight-Ashbury neighborhood of San Francisco. The house was later named "The Rainbow House", since it was painted in a myriad of colors. At the time of her ownership of the home, it was covered with beast-themed murals on the interior. The Rainbow House later inspired Bob Buckter (also known as Dr. Color), a San Francisco-based color consultant for Victorian Homes.

She had taught art classes at Sierra College. Peeples-Bright had a retrospective exhibition, Maija Peeples-Bright's: World of Woof (2012) at the Blue Line Gallery in Roseville, California.

Peeples-Bright has work in the permanent collections of the Minneapolis Institute of Art and the Fine Arts Museums of San Francisco. The artist book, Nut Pot Bag or Clay Without Tears (1971), which she co-author is found in the permanent collections at Yale University Art Gallery, and at the collection at Otis College of Art and Design.

== Personal life ==
Maija Peeples-Bright's first marriage was to artist and professor David Zack (1938–1995), whom she lived with in San Francisco, and later in Regina, Saskatchewan, Canada. Maija Peeples-Bright married Earl Peeples in 1972 and moved to the El Dorado Hills; Earl Peeples died of cancer in 1999. In 2000, she married Bill Bright, a close friend of Earl Peeples, and they moved to Rocklin, California. Bill Bright died of bladder cancer in 2015.

== Publications ==
- Nut Pot Bag or Clay Without Tears (artist book). Authored by Jim Adamson, Robert Arneson, Clayton Bailey, Fred Bauer, Maija Peeples-Bright, Victor Cicansky, David Gilhooly, Jim Melchert, Nicholas Stephens, Chris Unterseher, Peter Vandenberge, David Zack, Lowell Darling. University of California, Davis. 1971.
