= Gosha Levochkin =

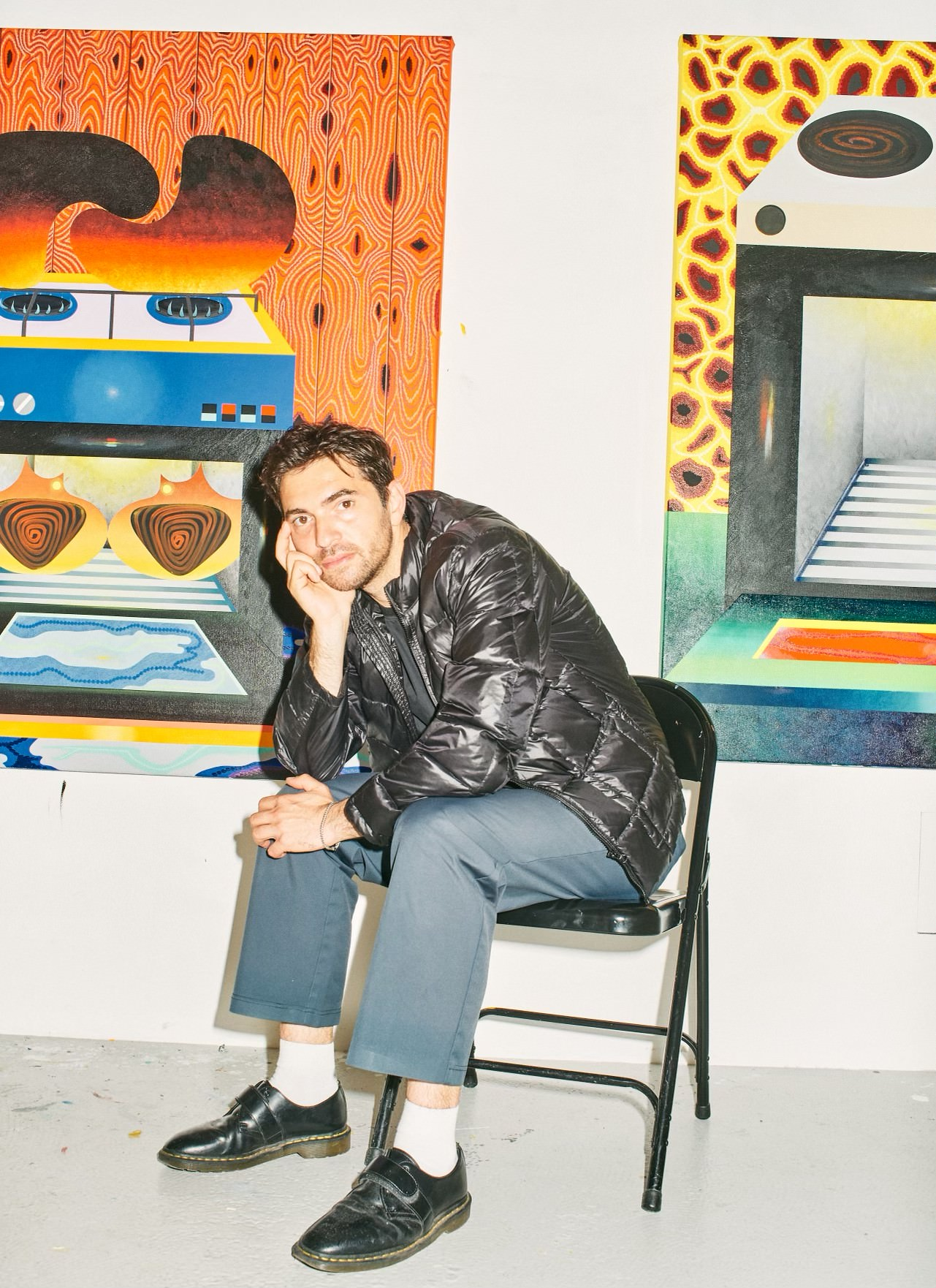
- Gosha Levochkin in Residency Studio
- Born: April 28, 1986 (age 39); Moscow, Russia
- Occupation: Artist
- Known for: Painting, Drawing
- Movement: Contemporary Art, Post-Russian Constructivism, Post-Suprematism, Surrealism, Post-Russian Avant-Garde, and Pop-Art.
- Website: http://www.levochkingosha.com/

Gosha Levochkin (born April 28, 1986) is a New York artist, born in Moscow, in the former Soviet Union. He has exhibited works in Los Angeles, New York City, London, Athens, Hong Kong, Japan, and Korea. He currently lives and works in Brooklyn, NY.

== Early life and education ==
His early years were shaped by the collapse of the Soviet Union, having spent the first decade of his life in Moscow, where he was born. His mother was born in Tbilisi, Georgia, his father was from Moscow. They both were professional violinists who played in orchestras for the Soviet Union army. They lived four blocks away from the Red Square.

Following his parents’ separation, he moved with his mother and sister to Los Feliz, a neighborhood in Los Angeles, California. Immersed in the local skateboarding and punk rock subcultures, he was introduced to the work of Raymond Pettibon, which led him to discover influential artists such as Mike Kelley, Peter Saul, El Lissitzky and Kazimir Malevich. Rather than pursuing a formal art education, he is largely self-taught, gradually developing his own artistic identity. His work draws heavily from Japanese visual culture, particularly manga as well as his own cultural heritage. Visually and conceptually, his practice is informed by elements of Post-Russian Constructivism, Post-Suprematism, and the broader Post-Russian Avant-Garde, as well as Pop Art.

== Career ==
Levochkin’s unidentifiable characters both create and solve problems within the spatial environment of the canvas. Each piece can be interpreted as a kind of worldly event in which these figures must harmoniously connect in order to overcome and adapt to the situation they inhabit. This connectivity produces a sculpturesque confluence of human-like forms and objects, which together construct a forceful, puzzle-like mechanism for resolving chaos. Gosha’s use of space is both elemental and structural; though geometrically premeditated, it remains deeply rooted in the organic substance of nature. He often incorporates the repetition of circular forms and tonal harmonies, drawing inspiration from Bauhaus principles—particularly its emphasis on clarity, balance, and universality. These circles evoke a sense of wholeness and spiritual cohesion, anchoring the work in rhythmic precision. The result is a visual language that suggests a kind of utilitarian perfection, drawn from the concrete world yet elevated into a symbolic order.

== Selected Exhibitions ==
=== 2024 ===
Signs From Above, The Hole NYC, New York, USA

=== 2023 ===
ALLOUCHE BENIAS, Athens, Greece

PLOP Residency London, UK

=== 2022 ===
Last Element, The Hole NYC, New York, USA

=== 2021 ===
Secret Buttons, Over the Influence, Los Angeles, USA

Ramp gallery London, UK

The Hole at Art Brussels 2021, The Hole NYC

=== 2020 ===
(synthetic reality), Over the Influence, Hong Kong

=== 2016 ===
Escape, KP Projects, Los Angeles, USA

=== 2015 ===
LOST, Soze Gallery, Los Angeles, USA

=== 2013 ===
LO-CAL, C.A.V.E. Gallery, Venice, USA

Seasonal Changes, Giant Robot, Los Angeles, USA

=== 2011 ===
Cluster Mess, HOLDUP Art, Los Angeles, USA

=== 2010 ===
Going Places, C.A.V.E. Gallery, Venice, USA

== Residencies ==
PLOP Residency, London, UK (2023)

== Selected bibliography ==
- Gemima, Clare. "Signs from Above: An interview with Gosha Levochkin." Whitehot Magazine, April 9, 2024
