= Robert David Brady =

American artist (born 1946)

Mrs. Fox by Robert David Brady, 1981, hand-built ceramic, Honolulu Museum of Art

Robert Brady (born 1946) is an American modernist sculptor, who works in ceramics and wood. Brady is a multidisciplinary artist who also works in painting, and illustration, and is best known for his abstract figurative sculptures. He came out of the California Clay Movement, and the San Francisco Bay Area arts scene of the 1950s and 1960s, which includes artists such as Peter Voulkos, Viola Frey, Stephen de Staebler, and Robert Arneson who was his mentor and teacher in college. Born in Reno, Nevada, and has lived in the San Francisco Bay Area for many decades.

== Education ==
During his senior year in high school, Brady was trying to fill an elective requirement at the last minute when he enrolled in a pivotal arts and crafts class. He credits his teacher, Tom Tucker, with changing the direction of his life by inspiring his future career in ceramics.

After high school, Brady attended the California College of Arts and Crafts (CCAC, later known as California College of the Arts, or CCA) in Oakland, California, from 1964 to 1968, and received a BFA degree in 1969.

After graduating he did a short stint in the United States Navy, but was still unsure of where his future lay when he got out, so spent some time painting houses in order to support himself and his first wife.

A chance encounter with an article on famous ceramic artist Isamu Noguchi reignited the fire Brady previously felt for clay, and he immediately switched gears, deciding to go back to school to receive a master's degree from the University of California, Davis. During his time at UC Davis, Brady learned under acclaimed artists Robert Arneson and Manuel Neri. Later, while working at CCAC as a guest artist and instructor in 1978, Brady learned the art of Raku during a workshop from Hal Riegger^{[1]}, (author and pioneer of Raku in the U.S.), and subsequently began teaching those workshops alongside Riegger out in the California desert.

== Career ==
Brady first gained critical acclaim right after leaving school, when he caught the attention of some well-known art collectors during his first solo show. Those collectors were impressed by his 5-foot and 6-foot coil-built vessels; soon Brady's work began appearing in decor and fashion magazines. This exposure was an instrumental factor in launching his professional art career.

=== Materials and methods ===
Brady initiated his career in the ceramic arts, by investigating and experimenting with form and color, including Raku glazes, polychromy, oil pastels and mixed-media. In his smaller earthenware vessels, he tested the effects of pigmented clays and monotype printing methods on the clay. In making his large scale, and semi-abstract, figurative work, Brady initially used clay and bronze. However, starting in the late 1980s, he began a transition into using wood. He found the material more suited to creating the large scale, thin and elongated, yet often top-heavy sculptures he was making. These, and many other pieces of his, show an affinity for a very primal and ancient type of folk art which Brady has been exploring for decades. Including the ceramic, wood, and bronze sculptures, Brady has additionally used a variety of materials and methods to create masks, prints, paintings, and drawings to communicate through his art.

=== Teaching career ===
Brady has enjoyed a long and varied career as a teacher and honored professor of ceramics and art from the mid-1970s well into the early 2000s. His teaching jobs have spanned the U.S. from California to Maine, and Hawaii to Alaska, and overseas teaching opportunities have taken Brady to Japan, Canada, England, Jamaica, and Italy. His first job as an instructor was in the department of art at California State University, Sacramento (SSU) where he was an associate professor. While at SSU he taught ceramics and drawing from 1975 to 1980, and again from 1982 to 1985.

He also worked at the American River College in Sacramento, California, in 1975, and at the Appalachian Center for Craft in Smithville, Tennessee (a campus of Tennessee Tech School of Art, Craft & Design), where his wife, artist Sandy Simon, also taught.

Having been a guest instructor/artist/speaker at several schools, art centers, potteries and museums over the years, Brady has shared his knowledge with generations of other artists and art lovers. He has said, “The greatest reward in my career as an artist is the satisfaction of creating and discovery," and, "Being an artist has led to the appreciation and integration of aesthetic awareness in all aspects of my life. I am grateful for the rich and provocative life afforded me by being a member of the arts community."

== Collections ==
=== Museums ===
Many collections of Brady's artwork can be found around the world. Examples of the work can be found in The Crocker Art Museum (Sacramento, California), the San Francisco Museum of Modern Art (SFMOMA), the Oakland Museum of California (OMCA), the Honolulu Museum of Art, the Stedelijk Museum (Amsterdam), and the Smithsonian Institution’s Renwick Gallery, Washington, D.C.

=== Public installations ===
Public works of Brady's can be found at The Crocker Art Museum, the di Rosa Preserve in Napa, Ca, the Los Angeles County Museum of Art (LACMA), as well as in North Carolina, Little Rock, Arkansas, Salt Lake City, Utah, New York, West Palm Beach, Florida, Chicago, Illinois, North Dakota, Sacramento, California, and in Amsterdam.

This artist has no relationship to the Robert Brady Museum (Museo Robert Brady) in Cuernavaca, Mexico founded by a different Robert Brady (1928–1986).

== Recognition ==
Brady has received multiple fellowships from the National Endowment of the Arts in 1981, 1988, 1989, and 2008. He was also elected Fellow of the American Craft Council in 2007, and has been awarded the title Professor Emeritus for Sacramento State University where he taught for 33 years.
