= Marilyn Levine =

American artist

- Born: 22 December 1935; Medicine Hat, Alberta
- Died: 2 April 2005 (aged 69); Oakland, California
- Known for: Ceramics
- Movement: Trompe-l'œil, funk art
- Website: www.marilynlevine.com

Marilyn Levine (22 December 1935, Medicine Hat, Alberta – 2 April 2005, Oakland, California) was a Canadian ceramics artist known for her trompe-l'œil art. She built a reputation making ceramic works of art that looked like leather handbags, garments, and briefcases. She was associated with the funk art movement.

== Career ==
Levine grew up in Calgary, Alberta, and moved to Edmonton to study chemistry at the University of Alberta where she earned a master's degree in 1959. In 1961, she moved to Regina with her husband, Sidney Levine. Because she was unable to find sufficient employment in the field of chemistry, Levine enrolled in drawing, painting, art history, and pottery courses through the University of Saskatchewan Extension Program.

After a trip to California in 1968, she decided to make pottery her career, and she moved to California a year later. She studied sculpture at University of California, Berkeley, under the tutelage of Peter Voulkos. It was during this time that she began to develop her trademark realistic style. It was during her time in California that she became associate with the funk art movement. She completed two degrees at the University of California, Berkeley (MA, 1970; MFA, 1971). During her second year at Berkeley, she became focused on inanimate objects (particularly leather items) as "records of human experience and activity." Levine quickly developed this talent for creating highly realistic representations of leather objects using ceramics, with attention to the fine details of aging, wearing, and shaping of the leather.

She taught art a number of universities including UC Berkeley, the University of Saskatchewan and the University of Utah. In 1975 she divorced Sidney Levine. In 1976, she moved to Oakland, California, and established a studio with Peter Voulkos.

During her career she had around 40 solo shows. Her work is held in the Los Angeles County Museum of Art, the San Francisco Museum of Modern Art, the Museum of Arts and Design in New York, the Museum of Contemporary Art in Chicago, the National Museum of Modern Art in Kyoto, the Australian National Gallery in Canberra, the Montreal Museum of Fine Art and the Gardiner Museum in Toronto.

Levine died on 2 April 2005 in Oakland, California, due to mucosal melanoma.

Her work, RK Briefcase, was acquired by the Smithsonian American Art Museum as part of the Renwick Gallery's 50th Anniversary Campaign.

== Awards ==
Levine was awarded the Louise and Adolph Schwenk Memorial Prize for Sculpture in 1969. She received a medal at the International Academy of Ceramics in 1973.

== Further reading/Sources ==
- Marilyn Levine Website. http://www.marilynlevine.com/ Retrieved 13 March 2016.
- Beatty, Greg. "Marilyn Levine, Une rétrospective, A Retrospective." Espace, #47, Montreal, Spring 1999: pp. 32–35. ill.
- Bismanis, Maija, Timothy Long, and Sam Jornlin. Marilyn Levine: A Retrospective. (1998).
- Cowin, Dana. "Leather ? Marilyn Levine’s Ceramic Pieces Elevate Luggage to the Status of Art." Showcase, July/August 1986: p. 10. R.
- Donaldson, Judy. "Marilyn Levine: A Comprehensive Review," Fusion Magazine, Vol. 24, No. 1, January 2000: pp. 10–12, ill.
- Timothy Long, ed., Regina Clay: Worlds in the Making (2005)
- Long, Timothy and Maija Bismanis. Marilyn Levine: A Retrospective. MacKenzie Art Gallery, Regina, SK. 1998: ill.
- Peterson, Susan. "Ceramics of Marilyn Levine." Craft Horizons, February 1977: pp. 40–43, 63–64, ill. pp. 40, 42, 43.
- Prokopoff, Stephen. "Marilyn Levine: A Decade of Ceramic Sculpture," Institute of Contemporary Art, Boston, 1981: ill.
- Treib, Marc, "On Reading Marilyn Levine," Ceramics: Art & Perception, Issue 59, March 2005: pp. 44–47, ill. pp. 44–47.
- Zhou, Guangzhen Poslin. "Marilyn Levine: The Master Makes Reminiscent Leather Products." Ceramic Art, 15, (Taiwan), 1997: pp. 90–93, ill.
- "Oral history interview with Marilyn Levine", 2002 May 15, Archives of American Art, Smithsonian Institution. Retrieved 13 March 2016.
