= Johanna Billing =

Swedish artist

- Born: 1973 (age 52–53); Jönköping
- Known for: Video art
- Notable work: "In Purple" (2019) "Pulheim Jam Session" (2015) "I'm Gonna Live Anyhow Until I die" (2012) "I'm Lost Without Your Rhythm" (2009) "Another Album" (2006) "Magical World" (2005) "You Don't Love Me Yet" (2003)

Johanna Billing (born 1973) is a Swedish artist. Her work has been featured in major group exhibitions such as Dokumenta 12, Istanbul Biennial (2005) and the 50th Venice Biennale.

== Life and work ==
Johanna Billing was born 1973 in Jönköping, Sweden. She lives and works in Stockholm, Sweden. Billing studied at Konstfack University of Arts, Crafts and Design in Stockholm, Sweden graduating in 1999.

Recent works include: In Purple (2019), Pulheim Jam Session (2015) and I'm Gonna Live Anyhow Until I die (2012). Other significant works include: I'm Lost Without Your Rhythm (2009), Another Album (2006), You Don't Love Me Yet (2003) and Magical World (2005). Many of the film's soundtracks exist as soundtrack records published by the German label Apparent Extent. Between 1998 and 2010 Billing ran the independent record label Make it Happen. The interest in music is also expressed through the long term and ongoing touring project You Don’t Love Me Yet (2002-2021) in which over 300 artists and groups in different cities have interpreted the song with the same title, originally written by Roky Erickson 1984.

== Exhibitions ==
Billing has exhibited internationally. Selected solo exhibitions include:

- 2021: In Purple, Konsthall 16, Riksidrottsmuseet, Stockholm, Sweden
- 2020: In Purple, Hollybush Gardens, London, United Kingdom
- 2019: In Purple, Stadsbiblioteket, Jönköping, Sweden
- 2017: Jam Session, with Betty Bailey, Et al., San Francisco, United States
- 2017: About Art: I'm Lost Without Your Rhythm, Trondheim Kunstmuseum, Trondheim, Norway
- 2016: Keeping Time, Villa Croce, Genova, Italy
- 2015: Pulheim Jam Session, Hollybush Gardens, London, United Kingdom
- 2014: I'm Gonna Live Anyhow Until I Die, Fieromilanocity, Milan, Italy
- 2012: I’m Gonna Live Anyhow until I Die, The Mac, Belfast, Northern Ireland, United Kingdom
- 2011: I'm Lost Without Your Rhythm, Crystal, Stockholm, Sweden
- 2010: I'm Lost Without Your Rhythm, Modern Art Oxford, Oxford, United Kingdom
- 2009: I'm Lost Without Your Rhythm, Camden Art Centre, London, United Kingdom
- 2009: This Is How We Walk On the Moon, Mercer Union, Toronto, Canada
- 2008: This Is How We Walk On the Moon, Malmö Konsthall, Malmö, Sweden
- 2007: Forever Changes, Museum for Gegenwartskunst, Basel, Schweiz
- 2007: Keep on Doing, DCA, Dundee Contemporary Art Center, Dundee, United Kingdom
- 2007: Another Album and other films, Jönköpings Konstmuseum, Jönköpings, Sweden
- 2007: Another Album, Hollybush Gardens, London, United Kingdom
- 2006: Magical World, PS.1, New York, United States
- 2005: Magical World, Hollybush Gardens, London, United Kingdom
- 2001: Where She Is At, Moderna Museet Projekt, Stockholm, Sweden
- 2001: Where She Is At, Oslo Kunsthall, Oslo, Norway

== Notable works ==
- In Purple (2019)
- Pulheim Jam Session (2015)
- I’m Gonna Live Anyhow until I Die (2012)
- I'm Lost Without Your Rhythm (2009)
- This Is How We Walk On the Moon (2007)
- Another Album (2006)
- Magic & Loss (2005)
- Magical World (2005)
- You Don't Love Me Yet (2003)
- Where She Is At (2001)
- Missing Out (2001)
- Project For a Revolution (2000)
- Graduate Show (1999)

== Publications ==
- Johanna Billing - Works [Paperback]
- Johanna Billing: Look Behind Us a Blue Sky [Hardback]
