= David Thauberger =

Canadian painter (1948–2026)

- Born: October 31, 1948; Holdfast, Saskatchewan, Canada
- Died: August 27, 2026 (aged 77); Regina, Saskatchewan, Canada
- Spouse: Veronica Pawliw
- Awards: Order of Canada; Saskatchewan Order of Merit

David Thauberger, CM SOM RCA (October 31, 1948 – August 27, 2026) was a Canadian painter known for work that is influenced by popular culture, postcard imagery, folk art, and utopian urban planning concepts.

== Life and career ==
Born in Holdfast, Saskatchewan, Thauberger received a Bachelor of Fine Arts degree in 1971 from the University of Saskatchewan (Regina campus) where he studied with David Gilhooly in ceramics. Gilhooly served as an early mentor to him as well as other artists of the region. In 1972, Thauberger received a master's degree in Art from California State University, Sacramento. He also received a Master of Fine Arts from the University of Montana in 1973. He actually had no formal training as a painter, but turned an interest in folk art (he curated exhibitions and contributing to documentaries and art books about folk art) into an influence when he began painting in the late seventies, creating iconic images of the prairies. The approach in his deadpan images of local architecture and landscape appropriated from sources like postcards, television or magazines is satirical.

In 1988, the MacKenzie Art Gallery in Regina surveyed his work of the last decade. In 2015, the Mendel Art Gallery in Saskatoon;and MacKenzie Art Gallery collaborated in organizing a comprehensive overview of his work curated by Sandra Fraser for the Mendel, and Timothy Long for the MacKenzie, titled "David Thauberger: Road Trips and Other Diversions". The show had an extensive tour across Canada. In 2023, Thauberger exhibited Endless Summer at Slate Fine Art Gallery in Regina.

Among his major commissions are postage stamp designs for Canada Post (1982, 1992), a mural for a Cineplex Odeon theatre (Richmond, Virginia, 1987), and a mural for Via Rail Canada (for inside a train which criss-crossed the country in 1988).

Thauberger's work is in major public collections including the National Gallery of Canada, Art Gallery of Ontario, Art Gallery of Hamilton, Winnipeg Art Gallery, and others.

His papers are in the Library of the University of Regina.

Thauberger died in Regina on August 27, 2026 at the age of 77.

== Honours ==
In 2008, he was made a Member of the Order of Canada in recognition of being "a pillar of prairie folk art". In 2012, he was made a member of the Saskatchewan Order of Merit in recognition of being "an advocate of prairie folk art, a knowledgeable collector and volunteer." He was a recipient of the Queen Elizabeth II Diamond Jubilee Medal in 2012, the Lieutenant Governor's Saskatchewan Artist Award in 2009 and was a member of the Royal Canadian Academy of Arts.

Thauberger also contributed to Canadian art through such governing boards as notably the Canadian Commission for UNESCO, the Canada Council for the Arts, and Canada Council Art Bank.
