= Christopher Brown (artist) =

American painter

- Born: 1951 (age 74–75); Marine Corps Base Camp Lejeune, Jacksonville, North Carolina, U.S.
- Education: University of Illinois Urbana-Champaign, University of California, Davis
- Occupations: artist, educator
- Known for: paintings, printmaking
- Movement: Neo-expressionism
- Website: christopherbrownpainting.com

Christopher Brown (born 1951), is an American artist and educator. He is known for his paintings and prints, often figurative and feature abstract settings with repeating patterns or shapes. He taught at the University of California, Berkeley, from 1981 to 1994. Brown has also worked as an adjunct professor at the California College of the Arts. Brown's work is associated with neo-expressionism.

== Early life and education ==
Christopher Brown was born in 1951 at the United States Marine Corps Base Camp Lejeune in Jacksonville, North Carolina. His father was a doctor. He was raised in Warren, Ohio and in Urbana, Illinois.

Brown attended the University of Illinois Urbana-Champaign, where he received a B.A. degree in 1973; followed by a M.F.A. degree in 1976 from the University of California, Davis (U.C. Davis). At U.C. Davis during his graduate studies, he was a student of Wayne Thiebaud, William T. Wiley, and Roy De Forest.

== Career ==
Many of Brown's large scale painting works are painted from memory and he sometimes uses photographs for reference. He creates collage-like arrangements within his paintings, which feature figurative images in surrealistic juxtapositions. It is common to also see repeating patterns or shapes within the painting background.

In 1977, Brown had his first solo exhibition at Gallery Paule Anglim in San Francisco; and in 1995 he held his first traveling museum solo exhibition, History and Memory: Paintings by Christopher Brown, organized by the Modern Art Museum of Fort Worth. In 1997, Brown served as an artist-in-residence at Pasadena City College, where his piece "Lindberg #2" is now displayed at the Shatford Library.

From 1981 until 1994; Brown served as a Professor and later as the Department Chair at the University of California, Berkeley.

Brown's work is in museum collections at the Minneapolis Institute of Art, Nelson-Atkins Museum of Art, San Francisco Museum of Modern Art, the Metropolitan Museum of Art, the Cleveland Museum of Art, the National Gallery of Art, and the Fine Arts Museums of San Francisco.
