= Performing Frogs =

Sculpture in Eugene, Oregon, U.S.

- Performing Frogs at the Hult Center for the Performing Arts in 2015
- Artist: David Gilhooly
- Year: 1982
- Type: Sculpture
- Medium: Ceramic; concrete
- Subject: Frogs
- Condition: "Treatment urgent" (1993)
- Location: Eugene, Oregon, United States; 44.052480°N 123.093111°W

Performing Frogs is a 1982 sculpture by David Gilhooly, in Eugene, Oregon, United States.

== Description ==
David Gilhooly's Performing Frogs (1982) is a ceramic sculpture depicting frogs performing acrobatics that was originally atop six concrete pillars. Some of the frogs have birds sitting on their heads. It is installed at the Hult Center for the Performing Arts. A nearby plaque reads: Performing Frogs/David Gilhooly/1982. The sculpture's condition was deemed "treatment urgent" by the Smithsonian Institution's "Save Outdoor Sculpture!" program in October 1993. It is administered by the City of Eugene.

The deteriorating sculpture was later moved indoors, above one of the Hult Center's entrances.

== See also ==
- 1982 in art
- Frogs in popular culture
