= Russell Yuristy =

Canadian artist

Russell Yuristy RCA
- Born: 1936 (age 89–90); Goodeve, Saskatchewan
- Known for: ceramicist, sculptor, graphic artist

Russell Yuristy RCA is a Canadian artist whose work is included in several major collections including the National Gallery of Canada. Yuristy was inducted as a member of the Royal Canadian Academy of Arts in 2014.

== Life and career ==
Yuristy was born in 1936 in Goodeve, Saskatchewan. He earned a BA from the University of Saskatchewan in 1959. He continued his studies at the University of Wisconsin–Madison earning an MSc in Art in 1967. Yuristy returned to the University of Saskatchewan as instructor from 1967 to 1971. In 1969 and 1971, he also was employed as workshop coordinator at the Emma Lake Artists' Workshops.

David Gilhooly arrived in Regina in the fall of 1969 to begin a two-year period teaching ceramics at the University of Regina. His California Funk work contrasted sharply with the more formal abstraction dominant in the department at his arrival. Yuristy and his colleague Joe Fafard were sympathetic to the concerns addressed by Gilhooly's approach and began to incorporate them into their own work. Fafard included a portrait of Yuristy in the series of plaster busts he made of his department colleagues in 1970 and Gilhooley included a casserole referencing Yuristy in his show Baboons Viewing an Exhibition of Frog Art from the same year.

Yuristy set up a studio in Silton, Saskatchewan in 1970 where he worked on ink drawings of both animals and humans travelling in imaginary vehicles. Fafard suggested that Yuristy might take these drawings and turn them into actual constructions. This led to a successful application to fund the creation of playground structures and the eventual formation of the Creative Playground Workshop. Yuristy designed and built playground sculptures in the form of animals in Ottawa, Spokane (for Expo 74), Churchill, Vancouver (for Expo '86), Swift Current, Saskatoon and Regina.

Fafard introduced Yuristy to working in clay in 1972 and he included Yuristy's work in the 1973 show 'The Regina Ceramists' which drew national attention to the Regina ceramics scene. Over the next few years, this led to exhibition opportunities outside of Saskatchewan for Yuristy with other Regina artists even though he later put aside his work in clay to concentrate on large public sculpture, painting and printmaking. Notably this included the national survey exhibition 'Canada Trajectoires 73' organized by the Canada Council and held in Paris at le Musée d'art moderne de la Ville de Paris.

In 1981 the Dunlop Art Gallery organized 'Russell Yuristy, Sculpture 1971–1981 in Photographs and Drawings', which toured to the Swift Current National Exhibition Centre.

Yuristy began teaching at the University of Ottawa in 1986 and later at the Ottawa School of Art. He moved to Montreal in 1993 and then returned to Ottawa in 1998.

== Works ==
- 1984 Saskatchewan Rain, CBC Building, Regina
- 1992 Fish, City Hall, Ottawa
- 1994 Switch Hitter, Ottawa Baseball Stadium

== Collections ==
Yuristy's work is represented in the Canada Council Art Bank, Ottawa; Canadian Museum of Civilization, Hull, Quebec; Department of External Affairs, Ottawa; Dunlop Art Gallery, Regina; MacKenzie Art Gallery, Regina; Mendel Art Gallery, Saskatoon; National Gallery of Canada, Ottawa; Ottawa Art Gallery; and the Saskatchewan Arts Board in Regina.
