= Emilie Halpern =

American artist

- Born: 1976 (age 48–49); Paris
- Education: Art Center College of Design, Pasadena CA, CA, MFA, Skowhegan School of Painting and Sculpture, University of California Los Angeles Los Angeles, CA, BA

Emilie Halpern is an American conceptualist artist. She works in ceramics, sculpture, film, room installations, photography and drawing.

== Personal life and education ==
Emilie's father is an immunologist at Stanford University. She originally had an interest in science, but turned to art. Her maternal grandfather Takanori Oguiss was a painter and has his own museum. Her paternal grandfather was Russian and exiled to Siberia in the czar's anti-semitic purges. In addition to her art, Emilie also teaches a fourth grade art class.

== Work ==
Emilie's work “Drown” is a haunting piece where once a day, 4 liters of ocean water are poured onto a concrete floor and allowed to evaporate. 4 liters is the volume that fills a person's lungs.

Emilie's work “Shōka” is an ikebana style installation in three parts. The first part, 地 (pronounced chi, translated as "earth") is an installation of phosphorescent rocks with a minimalist layout. During the day, the rocks are undistinguished. At night, the rocks are illuminated with a black light so they glow. The second part called 天 (pronounced ten, translated as "heaven") shows the areas of the gallery walls illuminated by the sun covered in gold foil. The third part called 人 (pronounced jin, translated as "human") are series of glazed ceramics white with blue shading hanging from the ceiling and arranged on a long block of wood. Maxwell Williams of KCET described these installations as without theatrics, but leaving “a long lasting residue in the viewers mind”

== See also ==
- Robert Smithson
