= Eleanor Ray =

American artist

Eleanor Ray is an American painter based in Brooklyn, New York. She was born in 1987 in Gainesville, Florida.

== Life and work ==
Ray graduated from the New York Studio School with a Master of Fine Arts in 2012 and from Amherst College with a Bachelor of Arts in 2009.

Her work depicts landscapes and interiors in small-scale paintings. She has painted art-historically significant sites, including Robert Smithson's "Spiral Jetty" at the Great Salt Lake in Utah, Donald Judd's installations in Marfa, Texas, and frescoed interiors in Assisi, Florence, and Padua, Italy. Writing about her work in 2019, the critic Kyle Chayka compared it to Giorgio Morandi and Pierre Bonnard. Ray believes that the smaller scale of the paintings allows for more control and intimacy. Her paintings are based on experiences visiting specific places.

Ray has been the recipient of a New York Foundation for the Arts Fellowship in Painting and residencies at Yaddo, Ucross Foundation, and Frances Niederer Artist-in-Residence at Hollins University.

== Exhibitions ==
- Eleanor D. Wilson Museum of Art at Hollins University
- Nicelle Beauchene Gallery; New York, NY (2019) (2021)
- Steven Harvey Fine Art Projects; New York City, NY
- College of William & Mary; Williamsburg, VA
- The Center for Contemporary Art; Bedminster, NJ
- Rothschild Fine Art; Tel Aviv
- American Academy of Arts and Letters; New York
- Interstate Projects; Brooklyn, NY
- BRIC House; Brooklyn, NY
- Howard's; Athens, GA
- The Landing; Los Angeles, CA

== Collections ==
- Art Gallery of New South Wales, Sydney, Australia
