= Nuno de Campos =

Portuguese painter

- Born: November 20, 1969 (age 56); Porto, Portugal
- Known for: Painter, real estate, proprietor
- Spouse: Munsun Park (2008-2020)
- Website: http://nunodecampos.com/

Nuno de Campos (born 1969) is a Portuguese painter, living in Porto, Portugal.

== Life and work ==
He attended Porto University starting in 1987, then attended Tufts University for graduate school.

His paintings are done in tempera, and are known for their luminous quality. He lives and works in Porto.
