= Funk art =

American art movement

Jim Nutt, I'm All A TWit, 1969, acrylic reverse painting on vinyl window shade with enamel on wood Pennsylvania Academy of Fine Arts.

Funk art is an American art movement that was a reaction against the nonobjectivity of abstract expressionism. An anti-establishment movement, Funk art brought figuration back as subject matter in painting again rather than limiting itself to the non-figurative, abstract forms that abstract expressionists such as Jackson Pollock and Mark Rothko were depicting. The movement's name was derived from the jazz musical term "funky", describing the passionate, sensuous, and quirky. During the 1920s, jazz was thought of as very basic, unsophisticated music, and many people believed Funk was an unrefined style of art as well. The term funk also had negative connotations because the word had an association with a foul odor. Throughout the 1960s and 1970s, Funk was a popular art form, mainly in California's Bay Area in the United States. Although discussed as a cohesive movement, Funk artists did not feel as if they belonged to a collective art style or group. This is because while its artists shared the same attitudes and created similar works, they were not necessarily working together.

== History ==
=== San Francisco Bay Area ===
The Funk art movement was a regional art movement, most predominant in Northern California. Some notable cities that the Funk movement was concentrated in are Berkeley, Marin County, Big Sur, Davis and North Beach. Many Funk artists began as Bay Area Figurative Movement painters in the 1950s. The movement originated from the bohemian underground in the Bay Area. During the 1960s, the Bay Area, specifically San Francisco, was a free and spiritual environment due to its beatnik art culture and the youth political activism reacting against the Vietnam War going on at the time. A variety of different cultures existed in the city, including poetry, jazz, and art. The freedom of thinking and culture was one of the main reasons that Funk art, a combination of both painting and sculpture, could develop and prosper in the Bay Area.

The Funk art that occurred throughout Northern California was the exact opposite of the "Finish Fetish" sculptures made in Southern California and the "primary structures" constructed in New York at the time. Funk art in the Bay Area was unique and not similar to any other movement of the 1960s. Jess, Wally Hedrick, Jay DeFeo, Viola Frey, Wallace Berman, Maija Peeples-Bright, and Bruce Conner were notable Funk artists who emerged from the Bay Area. Jess was one of the earliest and most influential Funk artists. In 1967, Peter Selz, the first director of the University Art Museum in Berkeley, California, organized a Funk Show there. Selz wanted to showcase the strange mindset in California through an array of Funk pieces. The exhibition featured works from Peter Voulkos, Mowry Baden and Bruce Conner, and it brought national recognition to the movement for the first time. Before this show, not many people outside of the Bay Area had seen or heard of Funk works, which relieved artists of pressures to become successful.

== Characteristics and techniques ==
The characteristics and techniques of Funk art works were more important than the subject matter.

=== Self-identification ===
Unlike earlier movements, such as Dada and Surrealism, Funk art was not concerned with public morality. Its artists were committed to identifying with their works on a personal level instead of the social, political, or existential. Through their absurdist works, Funk artists demonstrated personal feelings, emotions, and processes, and, in this way, their work may be said to have a closer relationship to nature rather than to culture, often featuring animals as subject matter. The works championed creative freedom and reflected the artists' lives, personalities, and experiences. Funk artists imbued their work with a sense of humor, senselessness, confrontation, vulgar sexuality, and autobiographical references. In their pieces, Funk artists are sometimes self-deprecating and ironic. Although the artworks may be humorous, they may also convey a more serious undertone at times. Since many of the pieces lacked a clear meaning, Funk art often contains a sense of ambiguity.

=== Found objects ===
Funk art was inspired by popular culture, may be brash or crude, and uses an unlikely mixture of materials and techniques. One of the movement's main characteristics the incorporation of found objects from consumer culture. It was part of a larger movement called Assemblage, which also included paintings that were composed of three-dimensional objects. Bruce Conner was known for his assemblage works, including Arachne, Spider Lady, For Marilyn, Cosmic Death Song, and Tick Tock Jelly Clock Cosmotron. Many of the Funk assemblage pieces were composed of thrown out garbage to demonstrate that Funk art was not a part of consumer culture. The pieces are usually three dimensional, but they resemble paintings more than sculptures. Jess and Wally Hedrick were two of the first Funk artists to use found objects in their works. The objects used tended to be items that were not meant to be noticed. The idea of using ordinary subject matter and common objects in art was influenced by Robert Rauschenberg and Jasper Johns. This concept is also influenced by the pieces of the Dada movement because both art movements use everyday objects and convey a sense of freedom. The objects and debris used in works symbolized decay much of the time. Due to the artists' lack of concern with technique, form, or durability, the works have a somewhat haphazard, spontaneous feel to them.

== Ceramics ==
Non-functional ceramic art was an important element in the Funk art movement, especially in Regina, California, the San Francisco Bay Area and Davis. Funk art ceramics were primarily composed from clay and sometimes possessed themes that were thought of as inappropriate. Similar to its three dimensional paintings, Funk ceramics contained vulgar male humor, as well as sexual references. Like other Funk works, the ceramics also used funny and absurd styles and images to relay the message that people should not take art or themselves too seriously. The ceramics were unrefined and blatant, and they all possessed the idea of a functionless sculpture for sculptures sake.

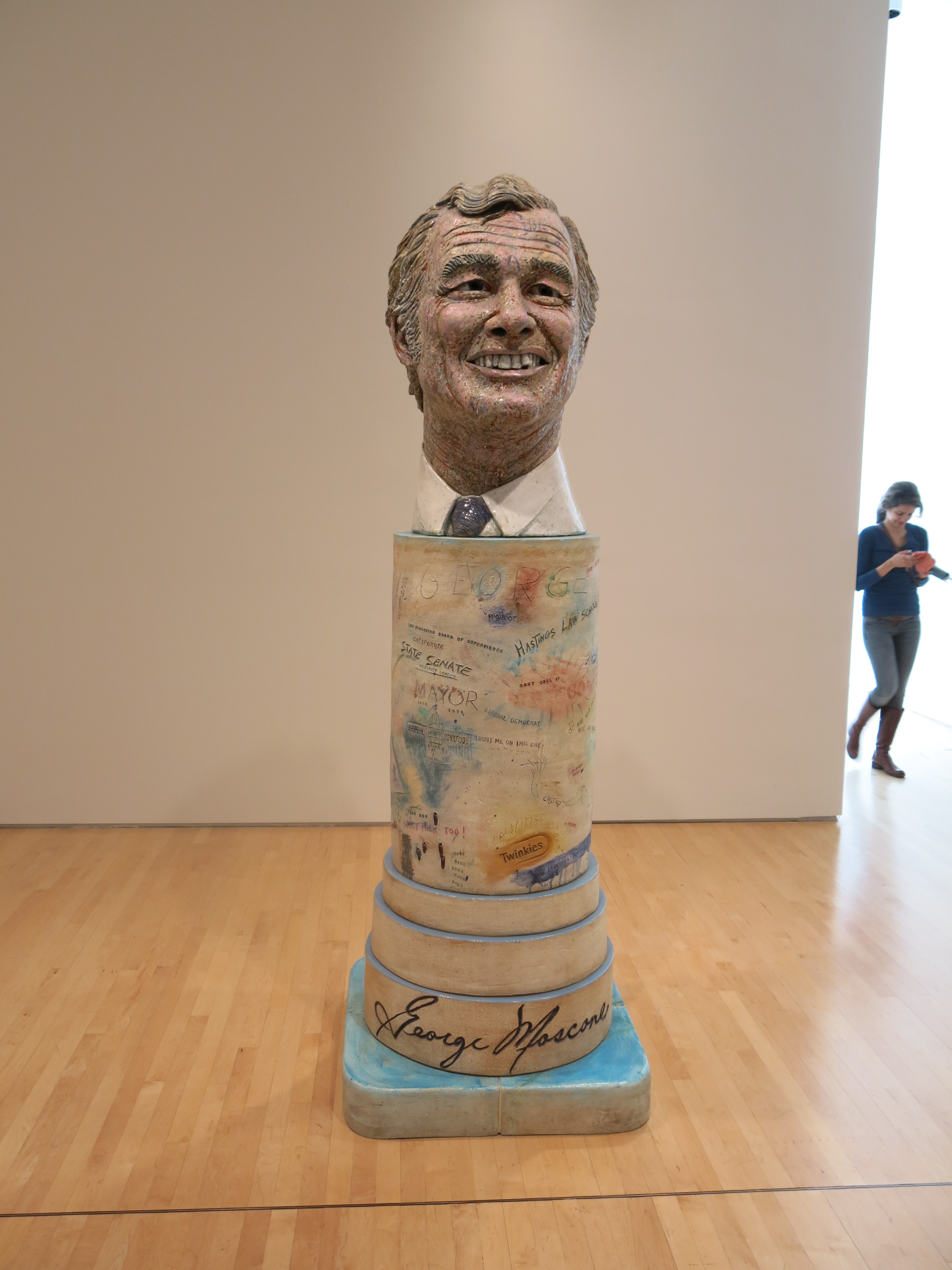
Portrait of George (Moscone), 1981, by Robert Arneson. glazed ceramic, 94 in × 31 1/2 in × 31 1/2 in.

=== Robert Arneson ===
Robert Arneson started the ceramic art movement within Funk art in the Bay Area. Before him, ceramics were considered more of a craft rather than a prestigious art form. After him, ceramics caught on as a serious form of art nationally. Robert Arneson created many ceramic sculptures, which eventually became a common work of Funk artists. Some believe his ceramics were influenced by pop art sculptures because they were of mundane, everyday objects. A main difference was that Robert Arneson also included personal elements to his sculptures, which was a defining factor of Funk art. His works were playful and full of color. Robert Arneson, along with other Funk artists, such as Roy De Forest, Manuel Neri, and William T. Wiley taught at the University of California, Davis, which was a center for the movement. Students from University of California, Davis, such as Margaret Dodd, David Gilhooly, Victor Cicansky, Chris Unterseher, Peter Vandenberge, and Maija Peeples-Bright continued Arneson's ceramics tradition.

In 1967, Robert Arneson drafted ceramicist Clayton Bailey to cover his classes at University of California, Davis while he took a sabbatical. Bailey, who hailed from Wisconsin, had been pursuing a personal, but similar artistic vision to what had been happening with the Funk art movement in northern California. In 1968, Bailey permanently relocated to the Bay Area, where he soon became a key figure in the region's developing Funk art scene.

== Exhibitions ==
Founded in Folsom, California, in 1962, the Candy Store Gallery played a key role in promoting Funk art by means of regular exhibitions until its closure in 1992.

== Important figures of the Funk art school ==
- Robert Arneson
- Clayton Bailey
- Robert David Brady
- Mark Bulwinkle
- Bruce Conner
- Roy De Forest
- Robert H. Hudson
- Ed Kienholz
- Jim Melchert
- Manuel Neri
- Gladys Nilsson
- Jim Nutt
- Maija Peeples-Bright
- Peter Saul
- Carlos Villa
- William T. Wiley
- David Gilhooly
- Patti Warashina
- Viola Frey

== Sources ==
- Daniels, Diana L., Clayton Bailey's World of Wonders, Sacramento, Crocker Art Museum, 2011.
- Dempsey, Amy, Styles, Schools and Movements, The Essential Encyclopaedic Guide to Modern Art, New York, Thames & Hudson, 2005.
- San Jose Museum of Art, The Lighter Side of Bay Area Figuration, San Jose, California, San Jose Museum of Art, 2000.
