= Roy De Forest =

American artist (1930–2007)

- Born: February 11, 1930; North Platte, Nebraska
- Died: May 18, 2007 (aged 77); Vallejo, California
- Education: San Francisco Art Institute, San Francisco State University
- Known for: Painting, Sculpture
- Movement: Funk art, Nut art
- Awards: National Endowment for the Arts Award

Roy De Forest (11 February 1930 – 18 May 2007) was an American painter, sculptor, and teacher. He was involved in both the Funk art and Nut art movements in the Bay Area of California. De Forest's art is known for its quirky and comical fantasy lands filled with bright colors and creatures, most commonly dogs.

== Early life ==
Roy De Forest was born in North Platte, Nebraska, to migrant farm workers during the Great Depression. De Forest's family lost their farm in Nebraska due to the harsh economic conditions during the Great Depression and were forced to move to Yakima, Washington. In Yakima, the De Forests bought a new farm, where they harvested pears and plums. De Forest described the socioeconomic status of his family as "not well off." Farm life had an important impact on De Forest's art. In his early art, De Forest experimented with landscape, which was inspired by the open land of his farm. Later in his career, De Forest began painting animals and other fantasy creatures in his art, which was inspired by growing up around farm animals.

== Education ==
De Forest attended Yakima Junior College, where his interest in art and art history developed. He initially was an engineering major, but soon realized that art came more naturally to him. In 1950 he moved to California to study at the California School of Fine Arts (later renamed to San Francisco Art Institute, now defunct) on scholarship, where he earned a bachelor's degree (1953). After serving in the US Army as a sign painter, De Forest went on to earn his master's degree (1958) at San Francisco State College (now San Francisco State University).

== Teaching career ==
After graduating from San Francisco State University, De Forest got his first teaching job at Yakima Junior College and spent two years teaching there. After this, he moved around from job to job for a short period of time, teaching children's classes in Oakland, California. He also taught night classes at the Bay Area prison, San Quentin. Here, he worked in the Adjustment Center, which later became death row. De Forest described his time teaching in San Quentin as extremely interesting and greatly influential on his teaching.

De Forest started working for a young University of California, Davis (U.C. Davis) Art Department in 1965. He was originally hired as a lecturer but worked his way up to assistant professor and eventually full professor in 1974. At U.C. Davis, De Forest worked with fellow artists Robert Arneson, Manuel Neri, Wayne Thiebaud and William T. Wiley. Notable students of De Forest included painter Christopher Brown. De Forest taught at UC Davis for twenty-seven years before retiring in 1992.

On the occasion of the exhibit, You See: The Early Years of the UC Davis Art Faculty, Renny Pritikin of the Nelson Gallery said, "History was made in the Central Valley in the early '60s when five great artists came together on the same faculty for over a decade and changed the nature and perception of art in California forever."

== Art career ==
De Forest's first exhibition was in 1955, and the work reflected the influence of Abstract Expressionism, along with a developing interest in assemblage. Beginning in 1960 and continuing throughout the decade De Forest had many one-person shows at San Francisco's Dilexi Gallery, operated by Jim Newman. He continued to submit paintings and other forms of art in exhibitions for over fifty years until his death in 2007.

=== Artists groups and movements ===
During the 1960s, U.C. Davis became a hub for the Funk art movement, with many of the artists associated with this movement either teaching at Davis, or having studied there. De Forest, along with Arneson, Wiley, and David Gilhooly often exhibited together under this heading, including semi-regular shows at the Candy Store Gallery in nearby Folsom, California. Another important figure in the Funk art movement was Clayton Bailey, who was De Forest's neighbor, friend, and collaborator.

De Forest, along with Bailey, was also a key figure in the development of Nut art, a new artistic genre that paralleled Funk art, and which flourished primarily in the late 1960s and early 1970s in northern California. De Forest preferred the term 'Nut' over 'Funk' to describe his art. A, perhaps apocryphal, account of the origin of the movement's name exists in an unpublished manuscript titled Basic Art written by self-appointed "Nut chronicler," David Zack.

=== Style ===
Untitled (Devils/Dogs) by Roy De Forest, 1989–90, acrylic, pastel and charcoal on paper in artist's frame, Honolulu Museum of Art

De Forest claims that "the aspect of invention in painting is the major factor in what you would call my style of painting." De Forest rejected traditional styles of painting claiming that "rather than, say, taking an image and then finding a way to express it in paint, sometimes I think about how to use a paint and then find an image that fits it." De Forest's style depicts journeys to fantasy lands filled with creatures, some familiar, some not. These lands were quirky, comical, and crowded, filled with texturized, hallucinogen colors. He describes himself as an "obscure visual constructor of mechanical delights."

De Forest believed in having a great amount of variety in paintings. He believed that everything in a painting should differ in size, shape, etc. De Forest rejected bilateral symmetry, instead preferring randomness. An example of this are the dots he adds in his work, which are a trademark of his style.

De Forest is most known for the use of animals and fantasy creatures in his art, particularly dogs. He became inspired to use animals in his artwork because he grew up on a farm and was constantly surrounded by dogs, cows, horses and other animals. He enjoyed adding creatures into his art because they reminded him of his past. De Forest believed that these animals also made his paintings more fun to make.

De Forest's work grew more representational as his career continued, and began to include suggestions of maps and motifs evocative of persons and animals as his career continued. By the late 1960s this transformation was nearly complete, as De Forest's work now freely mixed patterns and non-objective elements along with recognizable forms such as people, landscapes, and most notably, animals.

Towards the end of his life, De Forest's work also began to reflect his surroundings and life in Port Costa, California, with elements such as old brick buildings, birds, and dogs becoming more commonplace in his compositions.

As the physical forms in De Forest's work grew more recognizable, the origins and relationships between such grew more personal, suggestive of dream worlds and developing personal mythologies.

Overall, Roy De Forest is best known for his comic-like patchwork regionalist (California) style, often depicting dogs and other figurative content in his art. His painting, Untitled (Devils/Dogs) from 1989-1990 in the collection of the Honolulu Museum of Art is typical of this style, and like many of his paintings, De Forest made the frame as well.

=== Techniques ===
Early in De Forest's art career he used standard oil paint to make landscape paintings. Later, in a deliberate attempt to move away from abstract expressionism, De Forest began using different mixtures of water-based paint. This does not allow the color of his paintings to blend as it would with oil paint. He added polyvinyl acetate when mixing his own water-based paints to adjust the texture to his preference. In a 2004 interview, about his use of polyvinyl acetate, he explained, "It's a wonderful adhesive, so you can stick all kinds of junk in there: gravel, fillers of various kinds, and create all kinds of textures." He sometimes used cheap oil paint as well to get his desired rough, scorched textures.

Though primarily known as a painter, De Forest worked in other mediums as well, including sculpture, printmaking, and fabric. Several of his assemblage pieces, in addition to a few paintings, are in the diRosa collection.

=== Notable works of art ===
- Brothers Under the Feathers, 1962
- Frère Jacques, 1963
- Dog Lamp, 1970
- Country Dog Gentlemen, 1972
- Canis Prospectus, 1986

== Personal life ==
De Forest had two children, a son named Pascal and a daughter, Orianna. Pascal, following the tradition of his father, majored in art at San Francisco State University. He has three sisters; Beth, Beverly, and Lynn.

== Later years ==
De Forest lived his later years in Port Costa, California, surrounded by open land filled with dogs, cattle, and birds. De Forest died May 18, 2007, in Vallejo, California, after a short illness.

== Select public collections ==
- Oakland Museum of California
- San Francisco Museum of Modern Art
- The Fine Arts Museums of San Francisco
- di Rosa, Napa
- The Crocker Art Museum of Sacramento
- Santa Cruz Museum of Art & History
- The Hirshhorn Museum of Washington, D.C.
- The Rhode Island School of Design
- The Smithsonian American Art Museum, Washington, D.C.
- Minneapolis Institute of Art
- Museum of Contemporary Art, Los Angeles
- Cantor Arts Center (Stanford University)
- Palm Springs Art Museum
- The Fabric Workshop and Museum, Philadelphia, PA
- The Richard L. Nelson Gallery & Fine Arts Collection, Davis, CA
- Centre Georges Pompidou, Paris, France.
- San Jose State University Art Collection, San Jose, CA
- University of Michigan Museum of Art (UMMA), Ann Arbor, MI

== Exhibitions ==
SOLO EXHIBITIONS:

- "Maija Peeples-Bright and Roy De Forest," Venus Over Manhattan, New York, NY, 2024.
- "Habitats for Travelers," Jan Shrem and Maria Manetti Shrem Museum of Art, University of California, Davis, Davis, CA, 2023.
- "Roy De Forest: Selected Works," Brian Gross Fine Art, San Francisco, CA, 2021.
- "Roy De Forest," John Natsoulas Gallery, Davis, CA, 2020.
- "Roy De Forest," Venus Over Manhattan, New York, NY, 2020.
- "Roy De Forest: Works on Paper," Parker Gallery, Los Angeles, CA, 2019.
- "Of Dogs and Men: Prints by Roy De Forest," Gallery 72, Omaha, NE, 2017.
- "Man of Our Times: Drawings by Roy De Forest," Brian Gross Fine Art, San Francisco, CA, 2017.
- "Roy De Forest: Funk Origins Early Works 1954-1962," Foster Gwin Gallery, San Francisco, CA, 2017.
- "Roy De Forest," John Natsoulas Gallery, Davis, CA, 2017.
- "Of Dogs and Other People: The Art of Roy De Forest," Oakland Museum of California, Oakland, CA, 2017.
- "Civic Art Collection in Focus: Roy De Forest," San Francisco Arts Commission Main Gallery, San Francisco, CA, 2017.
- "Man of Our Times: Drawings by Roy De Forest," Brian Gross Fine Art, San Francisco, CA, 2017.
- "Of Dogs and Other People: The Art of Roy De Forest," Oakland Museum of California, 2017.
- "Roy De Forest: Let Sleeping Dogs Lie," Brian Gross Fine Art, San Francisco, CA, 2015.
- "Roy De Forest: A Simple Life," George Adams Gallery, New York, NY, 2013.
- "Roy De Forest: A Figure of Our Times," Brian Gross Fine Art, San Francisco, CA, 2012.
- "Bark!" John Natsoulas Gallery, Davis, CA, 2012.
- "Roy De Forest: Painting the Big Painting," Brian Gross Fine Art, San Francisco, CA, 2009.
- "Roy De Forest: A Memorial Exhibition, Paintings, Drawings and Constructions 1965-2007,"
- George Adams Gallery, New York, NY, 2008.
- "Roy De Forest: Recent Paintings," Brian Gross Fine Art, San Francisco, CA, 2006.
- "Roy De Forest: New Paintings," George Adams Gallery, New York, NY, 2005-2006.
- "New Works on Paper," Mobilia Gallery, Cambridge, MA, 2003.
- "A Slow Time in Arcadia: Roy De Forest and William T. Wiley 1960-2002," George Adams Gallery, New York, NY, 2002.
- "Roy De Forest & Gaylen Hanson," Paris Gibson Square Museum, Great Falls, MT; Yellowstone Art Museum, Billings, MT; Museum of Northwest Art, La Conner, WA; Schneider Museum of Art, Ashland, OR; Plains Art Museum, Fargo, ND, 1998-2001.*
- "New Constructions," George Adams Gallery, New York, NY, 1997.
- "New Paintings and Drawings," Frumkin/Adams Gallery, New York, NY, 1993.
- John Berggruen Gallery, San Francisco, 1992.
- Frumkin/Adams Gallery, New York City, 1990, 1993.
- Fuller Gross Gallery, San Francisco, CA, 1990.
- Cantor Center for the Visual Arts at Stanford University, Stanford, CA, 1990.
- "Roy De Forest," Fuller Gross Gallery, San Francisco, CA, 1989.
- Marilyn Butler Gallery, Santa Fe, NM, 1989.
- Dorothy Goldeen Gallery, Santa Monica, CA, 1988, 1991.
- Natsoulas/Novelozo Gallery, Davis, CA, 1988, 1990.*
- Struve Gallery, Chicago, IL, 1988.
- "Animal Images," Pittsburgh Center for the Arts, Pittsburgh, PA, 1987.*
- "New Paintings, Drawings & Constructions," Allan Frumkin Gallery, New York, NY, 1985.*
- "The Early Constructions," Nelson Gallery, University of California, Davis; University of Riverside, California: 1983-1984.
- Frumkin & Struve Gallery, Chicago, IL, 1983.
- Art Gallery, California State University, Chico, CA, 1982.
- Fuller Goldeen Gallery, San Francisco, CA, 1981, 1982, 1984, 1986.
- Nelson Gallery, University of California, Davis, CA, 1980, 1983.
- Triton Museum of Art, Santa Clara, CA, 1980.
- Fountain Gallery, Portland, OR, 1980.
- Blackfish Gallery, Portland, OR, 1980.
- Susan Whitney Gallery, Regina, Saskatchewan, Canada, 1980.
- E.B. Crocker Art Museum, Sacramento, CA, 1980.*
- Marian Locks Gallery, Philadelphia, PA, 1980.
- 605 East 3rd Street Gallery, Los Angeles, CA, 1979.
- Fresno City College, Fresno, CA, 1979.
- Michael Berger Gallery, Pittsburgh, PA, 1979.
- Contemporary Arts Forum, Santa Barbara, CA, 1978.
- Institute of Contemporary Art (with Robert Hudson), Boston, MA, 1977, 1978.
- Clark / Benton Gallery, Santa Fe, NM, 1977, 1978, 1981.
- Barbara Fendrick Gallery, Washington, D.C., 1976.
- Santa Barbara Museum of Art, Santa Barbara, CA, 1975.
- Retrospective exhibition. San Francisco Museum of Modern Art, CA; Fort Worth Art Center, TX; Utah Museum of Fine Arts, University of Utah, Salt Lake City, UT; Whitney Museum of American Art, New York, NY: 1974-1975*
- Shasta College, Redding, CA, 1974.
- Galerie Allen, Vancouver, Canada, 1974.
- Galerie Darthea Speyer, Paris, France, 1974, 1977, 1981, 1987.
- Glenbow-Alberta Gallery, Calgary, Canada, 1974.
- Allan Frumkin Gallery, Chicago, IL, 1973, 1977.
- Hansen Fuller Gallery, San Francisco, CA, 1971, 1973, 1974, 1975, 1978.
- Manolides Gallery, Seattle, WA, 1971, 1972, 1978, 1979.
- Gallery Marc, Washington, D.C., 1971.
- California Palace of the Legion of Honor, San Francisco, CA, 1971.
- Candy Store Gallery, Folsom, CA, 1971.
- San Francisco Art Institute, San Francisco, CA, 1969.
- Cowell College, University of California, Santa Cruz, CA, 1969.
- Art Gallery, City College of Sacramento, Sacramento, CA, 1967.
- Allan Frumkin Gallery, New York, NY, 1966, 1972, 1975, 1977, 1979, 1985.*
- Peninsula Gallery, Menlo Park, CA, 1966.
- San Francisco Art Association Gallery, San Francisco, CA, 1962.
- Dilexi Gallery, Los Angeles, CA, 1962.
- Dilexi Gallery, San Francisco, CA, 1960, 1961, 1962, 1963, 1965, 1966
- Stone Court Gallery, Yakima, WA, 1959, 1960.
- East & West Gallery, San Francisco, CA, 1955, 1958, 1965.
