= Peter Saul =

American painter (born 1934)

- Born: 1934 (age 91–92); San Francisco, California
- Known for: Painting, Sculpture
- Movement: Funk art, Nut art

Peter Saul (born August 16, 1934) is an American painter. His work has connections with Pop Art, Surrealism, and Expressionism. His early use of pop culture cartoon references in the late 1950s and very early 1960s situates him as one of the fathers of the Pop Art movement. He realised about 800 paintings during his career.

== Early life and work ==
Peter Saul was born in San Francisco, California, and studied at the California School of Fine Arts from 1950 to 1952 and at Washington University in St. Louis from 1952 to 1956 before moving to Europe where he remained until 1964. Saul was inspired by 1940’s comic books such as Crime Does Not Pay, Plastic Man, and the painting Coney Island by Paul Cadmus that he saw reproduced in an art book his mother received from Book-of-the Month Club in 1939. After completing art school in 1956, he developed a brushy art style influenced by de Kooning. In 1958 he decided to incorporate cartoon images such as Donald Duck and Superman as subjects in his paintings after seeing an issue of Mad magazine in a Paris bookstore. Roberto Matta introduced his work to the dealer Allan Frumkin and in 1961, he had his first show at the Allan Frumkin Gallery in Chicago, followed in 1962 by simultaneous shows at Galerie Breteau in Paris and the Allan Frumkin Gallery in New York City. He was quickly classified as a Pop artist, albeit one with “too much paint”.

Art critic John Yau wrote of Saul's work in The Brooklyn Rail:

His orchestration of the intertwining, overlapping, cartoony figures could only have been done by someone who absorbed the all-over compositions of the Abstract Expressionists. He juices the painting up to a fever pitch with a jarring, manic palette of bright reds, blues, and greens. And then there are the details that one finds within the painting—the mayhem and violence, all precisely and lovingly depicted with hair-raising glee.

== Later life and work ==
In 1964 Saul returned to the United States and settled in the San Francisco Bay Area where he lived for eleven years. During this time, he began loose highly personal interpretations of the Vietnam War, as well as agonized psychological portraits of politicians and other personalities, in a tight linear style using bright Dayglo colors and acrylics. He was loosely affiliated with other Bay Area artists and participated in the 1967 Funk show. In the 70s, Saul moved into interpretations of historical masterpieces such as Rembrandt’s Nightwatch and Picasso’s Guernica, and also what he thought of as American scene painting making use of cinematic illusionistic space.

Saul spent the 1980s and 90s in Austin, Texas where he taught at the University of Texas. His former students include Erik Parker, Tom Holmes and Willy Bo Richardson. During this time his content diversified and his style focused on ever more glamorous treatment of “low” subjects, heavily influenced by 19th-century painting. The critic Holland Cotter in a 2008 New York Times review of a retrospective of his work called Saul "a classic artist’s artist, one of our few important practicing history painters and a serial offender in violation of good taste". Saul’s work has often been independent of specific art movements and thus he "has spent a lifetime avoiding easy critical definition". In 2020, Peter Saul had his first New York museum survey at the New Museum.

== Exhibitions ==
- 1981: Peter Saul on Politics, Art, and Mortality, Madison Art Center (Madison Museum of Contemporary Art), Wisconsin
- 2016: Peter Saul: You Better Call Saul, Gary Tatintsian Gallery, Moscow.
- 2017: Survey exhibition, Schirn Kunsthalle in Frankfurt; it later traveled to Deichtorhallen in Hamburg.
- 2019: Retrospective exhibition, Musée Les Abattoirs, Toulouse, France
- 2020: Almine Rech, Paris
- 2020: Peter Saul: Crime and Punishment, The New Museum, New York, New York.

== Recognition ==
In 2010 Saul was elected to the American Academy of Arts and Letters.

== Iconography ==
Yes that's Saul, Folks is a portrait of Peter Saul by his friend, the Peruvian painter Herman Braun-Vega.
