= Richard Shaw (artist) =

American ceramicist and professor (born 1941)

Richard Shaw (born 1941 in Los Angeles, California, United States) is an American ceramicist and professor known for his trompe-l'œil (French for "fool the eye") style. A term often associated with paintings, referring to the illusion that a two-dimensional surface is three-dimensional. In Shaw's work, it refers to his replication of everyday objects (such as tin cans, playing cards, and cutlery) in porcelain. He then glazes these components and groups them in unexpected and even jarring combinations. Interested in how objects can reflect a person or identity, Shaw poses questions regarding the relationship between appearances and reality.

== Education and career ==
The child of an artist mother and a Walt Disney cartoonist/animator father, Shaw was surrounded by art from a young age. Though he is now known for his work with ceramics, he initially planned on becoming a painter. For the last three years of high school, he attended Desert Sun School, located in the San Jacinto Mountains – a private school which had, according to Shaw, an environment that fostered creativity in its students. Still set on becoming a painter, Shaw then briefly attended Orange Coast College. At Orange Coast, he met Martha, a painter who would become his wife, and he first began to work with ceramics.

Following his time at Orange Coast College, Shaw attended the San Francisco Art Institute. He identifies 1963 as the year during which he began seriously working with ceramics and pottery, citing professors Ron Nagle, Jim Melchert, Peter Voulkos, and John Mason as inspiring figures during his time at the Institute. From Voulkos and Mason – who Shaw credits with "revolutionizing" the ceramics scene in the later twentieth century – he learned to experiment with new kiln firing techniques. The trend in the artistic ceramics world (as opposed to the "commercial pottery" world) had been to create high-fire pieces – pieces fired at higher temperatures, which maximized durability. However, in 1965, Shaw's work was displayed in the Museum of Arts and Design (previously the Museum of Contemporary Crafts) in New York, and many of his pieces there were low-fire, which resulted in their having a different surface finish than traditional high-fire pieces.

In 1965, Shaw earned a Bachelor of Fine Arts from San Francisco Art Institute, after which he attended the New York State College of Ceramics at Alfred University for a semester, about which he has said, "Where else do you go if you're into ceramics?" He returned to California to teach at the San Francisco Art Institute from 1966–1987. While teaching at the Institute, he also attended the University of California, Davis, earning his Master of Fine Arts in 1968. Shaw was Professor of Ceramics at the University of California, Berkeley from 1987 to 2012, and he currently lives in Fairfax, CA with his wife Martha.

== Awards ==
Shaw has received the following awards:

- 2000: Marin Arts Council Board Award, San Rafael, California
- 1998: Shigaraki Cultural Ceramic Park, Shigaraki, Japan
- 1998: Artist in Residence, Phillips Academy, Andover, Massachusetts
- 1996: Annual Life Member Award, Falkirk Arts Center, San Rafael, California
- 1988: Honorary Doctor of Fine Arts Degree, San Francisco Art Institute
- 1987: Visiting Artist Grant, Atelier Experimental de Recherche et de Création, Manufacture Nationale de Sèvres, Paris, France
- 1974: National Endowment for the Arts Fellowship
- 1971: National Endowment for the Arts Fellowship

== Museum collections ==
Shaw is represented in the following museum collections:

- Museum of Arts and Design, New York, New York
- National Museum of Modern Art, Tokyo, Japan
- Oakland Museum of California, Oakland, California
- Racine Art Museum, Racine, Wisconsin
- Renwick Gallery of the Smithsonian American Art Museum, Washington, DC
- San Francisco Museum of Modern Art, San Francisco, California
- Stedelijk Museum, Amsterdam, the Netherlands
- Utah Museum of Fine Arts, Salt Lake City, Utah
- De Young Museum, San Francisco, CA

== Selected solo exhibitions ==
Shaw's solo exhibitions around the United States include:

- 2014: Richard Shaw: Ceramic Sculptures, B. Sakata Garo, Sacramento, California
- 2010: Richard Shaw: Four Decades of Ceramics, Sonoma County Museum, Santa Rosa, California
- 2007: Richard Shaw: Working Drawings from Studio Sketchbooks, Diablo Valley College, Pleasant Hill, California
- 2003: Trompe l'Oeil Ceramics, Mobilia Gallery, Cambridge, Massachusetts
- 1998: Master's Touch, Tempe Art Center, Tempe, Arizona
- 1990: Palo Alto Cultural Center, Palo Alto, California
- 1987: The Contemporary Museum, Honolulu, Hawaii
- 1983: Madison Art Center, Madison, Wisconsin
- 1979: Braunstein/Quay Gallery, San Francisco, California

== Selected group exhibitions ==
Shaw's work has been included in the following group exhibitions around the United States:

- 2017: Variations on a Theme: Teapots from RAM's Collection, Racine Art Museum, Racine, Wisconsin
- 2016: Order & Nature, Anglim Gilbert Gallery, San Francisco, California
- 2013: New Blue and White: Contemporary Art and Design, Museum of Fine Arts Boston, Boston, Massachusetts
- 2013: Top 10 at 10: Favorites from RAM's Collection, Racine Art Museum, Racine, Wisconsin
- 2012: Crafting Modernism, Midcentury American Art and Craft, Museum of Art and Design, New York, New York
- 2012: Indelibly Yours: Smith Anderson Editions and the Tattoo Project, de Saisset Museum, Santa Clara, California
- 2012: Invite and Ignite: the 25th Exhibitions Anniversary and Symposium, New Castle, Maine
- 2011: Not So Still Life, Racine Art Museum, Racine, Wisconsin
- 2007: The Reality of Things: Trompe l'Oeil in America, Vero Beach Museum, Vero Beach, Florida
- 2005: I Hope You Learned Your Lesson, Sonoma Valley Museum of Art, Sonoma, California
- 2004: Masters of Illusion: 150 Years of Trompe l'Oeil in America, Kresge Art Museum, Michigan State University, East Lansing, Michigan
- 2002: Something, Anything, Matthew Marks Gallery, New York, New York
- 2000: Expanded Visions, Bayly Art Museum, University of Virginia, Charlottesville, Virginia
- 1995: Altered and Irrational, Selected Works from the Permanent Collection, Whitney Museum of American Art, New York, New York
- 1994: The Ritual Vessel, Perimeter Gallery, Chicago, Illinois
