= Robert Arneson =

American sculptor and professor (1930–1992)

- Born: September 4, 1930; Benicia, California, U.S.
- Died: November 2, 1992 (aged 62)
- Education: California College of the Arts, Mills College
- Known for: Sculpture, Ceramics
- Movement: Funk movement, Nut art
- Spouses: Jeanette Frank Jensen (m. 1955; div. 1972) Sandra Lynne Shannonhouse (m. 1973; died 1992)
- Children: 5

Doyen by Robert Arneson, 1972, glazed ceramic, Honolulu Museum of Art

Robert Carston Arneson (September 4, 1930 – November 2, 1992) was an American sculptor and professor of ceramics in the Art department at University of California, Davis for nearly three decades.

== Early life and education ==
Robert Carston Arneson was born on September 4, 1930, in Benicia, California. He graduated from Benicia High School and spent much of his early life as a cartoonist for a local paper. Arneson studied at California College of the Arts in Oakland, California, for his BFA degree and went on to receive an MFA from Mills College in Oakland, California, in 1958. At Mills College he studied under Antonio Prieto.

== Career ==
35 Year Portrait, a double-sided self-portrait sculpture on display at the Smithsonian American Art Museum

During the start of the 1960s, Arneson and several other California artists began to abandon the traditional manufacture of functional ceramic objects and instead began to make nonfunctional sculptures that made confrontational statements. The new movement was dubbed Funk Art, and Arneson is considered the father of the ceramic Funk movement.

His body of work contains many self-portraits which have has been described as an "autobiography in clay". Doyen from 1972, in the collection of the Honolulu Museum of Art is an example of the artist's humorously caricatured self-portraits.

Even his large Eggheads sculptures bear a self-resemblance. Among the last works Arneson completed before his 1992 death, five Eggheads were installed on campus at UC Davis around 1994. The controversial pieces continue to serve as a source of interest and discussion on the campus, even inspiring a campus blog by the same name. A copy of the egghead sculpturesYin & Yang was installed in San Francisco at the Embarcadero, but were removed from display in 2013.

One of Arneson's most famous and controversial works is a bust of George Moscone, the mayor of San Francisco who was assassinated in 1978. Inscribed on the pedestal of the bust are words representing events in Moscone's life, including his assassination: the words "Bang Bang Bang Bang Bang", "Twinkies," and "Harvey Milk Too!" are visible on the front of the pedestal.

== Teaching career ==
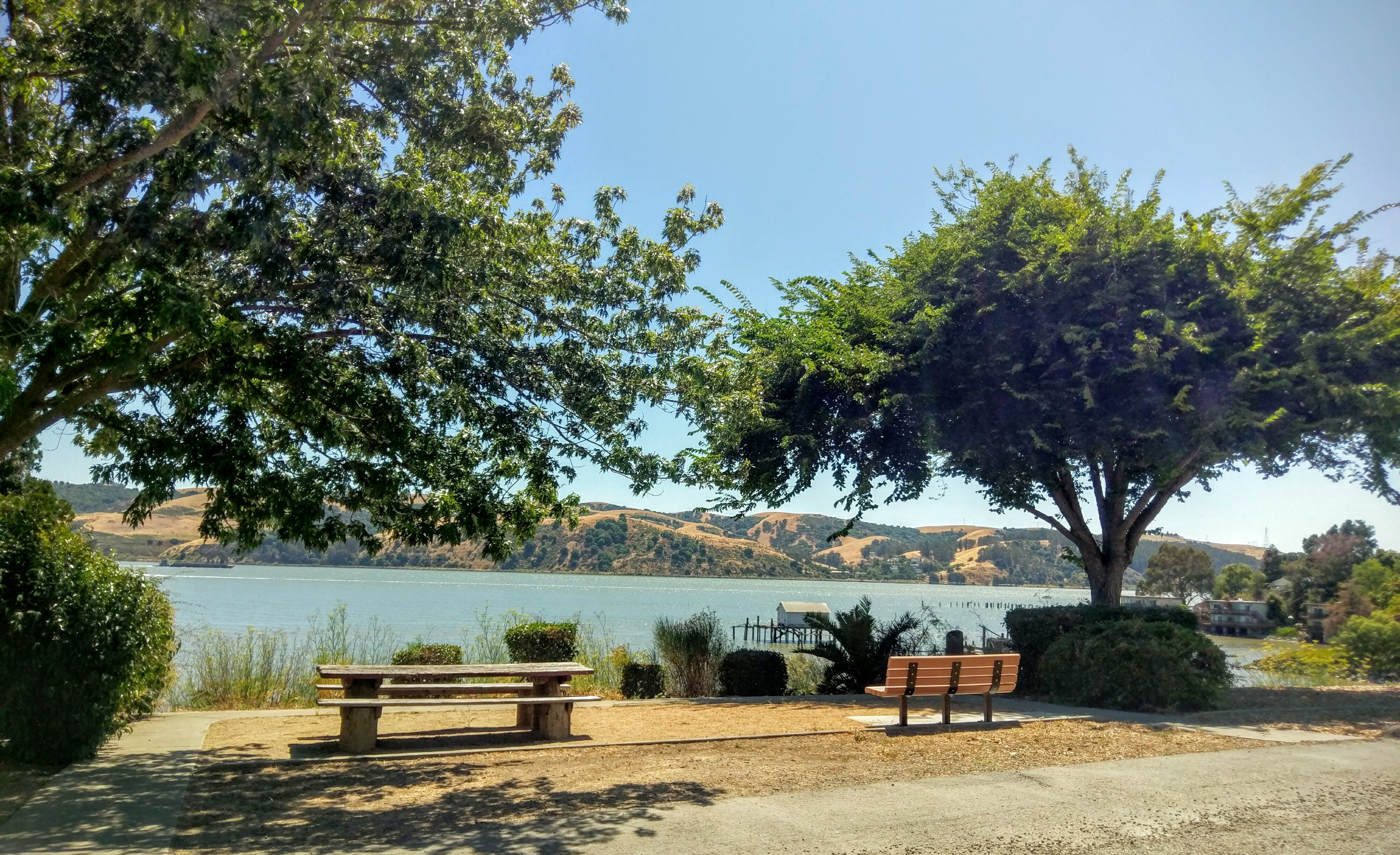
The Robert C. Arneson Park in Benicia, California

Arneson's teaching career began soon after receiving his MFA degree, with a stint at Santa Rosa Junior College, in Santa Rosa, California (1958 to1959). This was followed by a position at Fremont High School (1959 to 1960) in Oakland, California, before advancing to teach design and crafts at Mills College, also located in Oakland (1960 to 1962).

Arneson's next appointment in 1962 was at University of California, Davis, where his talents were recognized by Richard L. Nelson, who had founded the Art Department. It was during this period of the early 60s that Nelson was assembling a faculty that would come to be celebrated as one of the most prestigious in the nation. In addition to Arneson, Nelson had also selected Manuel Neri, Wayne Thiebaud and William T. Wiley, each of whom would go on to achieve international recognition. Initially hired to teach design classes (in the College of Agriculture), it was Arneson who established the ceramic sculpture program for the Art Department. It was in many ways a bold and radical move, in that ceramics were not yet recognized as a medium appropriate for fine art at that time. Since its founding, the UC Davis campus ceramics studio has been housed in a corrugated metal building known as TB-9, and it was here that Arneson held court for nearly three decades until his retirement in the summer of 1991.

== Death and legacy ==
Arneson died on November 2, 1992, after a long battle with liver cancer. He was survived by his wife, Sandra Shannonhouse, and his five children. His home town of Benicia, California established a park in his memory, along the Carquinez Strait.

=== Collections ===
Arneson's fame is far-reaching, and his works can be found in public and private collections around the world, including the Art Institute of Chicago, the Virginia Museum of Fine Arts (Richmond, Virginia), the Hirshhorn Museum and Sculpture Garden (Washington, DC), where his 1979 glazed ceramic "Elvis" bust is housed, since 1985, di Rosa (Napa, California), the Honolulu Museum of Art, the Metropolitan Museum of Art (New York City), the Museum of Contemporary Art (Kyoto, Japan), the San Francisco Museum of Modern Art, the Racine Art Museum (Racine, Wisconsin), the Smithsonian American Art Museum, the Whitney Museum of American Art (New York City), the Birmingham Museum of Art, the UI Stanley Museum of Art, the US Embassy in Yerevan, Armenia and the Crocker Art Museum (Sacramento, California). His creations are also at the Lowe Art Museum in Coral Gables, Florida.

The Nelson Gallery at UC Davis, where Arneson was a faculty member, owns 70 of the artist's works, including The Palace at 9am. The 70-square-foot (6.5 m^{2}) earthenware sculpture, a depiction of his former Davis residence, is considered among his most famous sculptures. Several of his etchings and lithographs are also on display in the library.

== Personal life ==
Arneson's first marriage was to Jeanette Frank Jensen, from 1955 until 1972 and ended in divorce. Together Arneson and Jensen had four sons.

His second wife was artist Sandra Lynne Shannonhouse, they were married from 1973 until his death in 1992. They had a daughter Tenaya Arneson.

== Publications ==
- Nut Pot Bag or Clay Without Tears (artist book). Authored by Jim Adamson, Robert Arneson, Clayton Bailey, Fred Bauer, Maija Peeples-Bright, Victor Cicansky, David Gilhooly, Jim Melchert, Nicholas Stephens, Chris Unterseher, Peter Vandenberge, David Zack, Lowell Darling. University of California, Davis. 1971.
