= Lowell Darling =

American conceptual artist

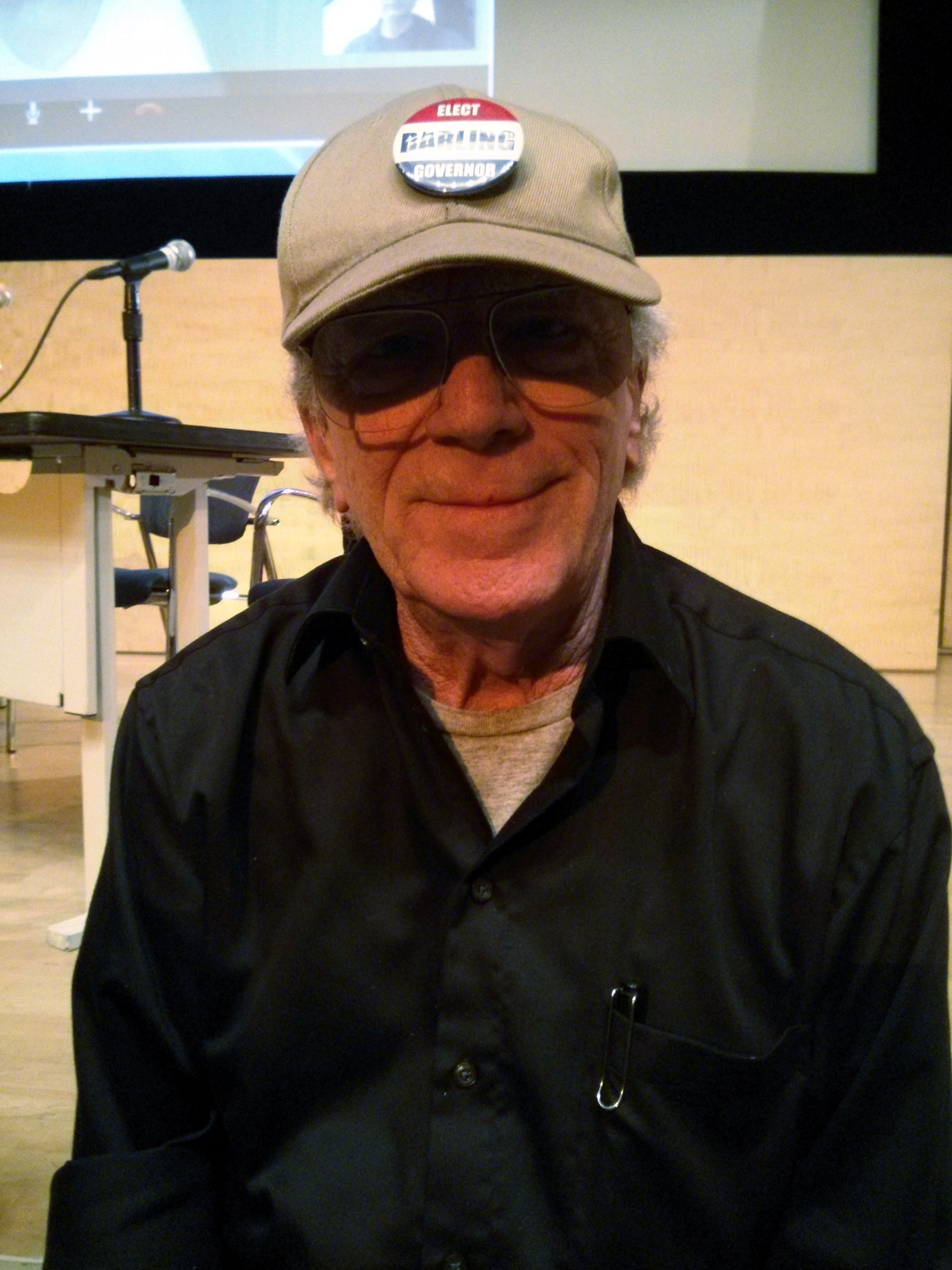
- Lowell Darling in San Francisco, February 2014. The button on his hat is a political ad supporting his candidacy for California governor.
- Known for: Performance Art, Conceptual Art
- Movement: Nut art

Lowell Darling (born 1942) is an American conceptual artist known for satirical 1970s performances about urban and environmental issues, which included "nailing down" cities to prevent drifting, conducting "urban acupuncture" by placing oversize needles in the ground, and "stitching up" the San Andreas Fault. He ran for governor of California in 1978 and 2010.

Darling has practiced what he calls "contemporary archaeology" by dumpster diving for unwanted items, including 35 mm movie film strips discarded by Hollywood editing studios, and using them to create found object art works. These form much of his "Hollywood Archaeology" series, which was made into a website sponsored by the Whitney Museum of Art in 1995.

Other artistic performances include Darling's run for public office in the 1978 California gubernatorial election, receiving about 62,000 votes against incumbent governor Jerry Brown in the primaries. He is the creator of the "Fat City School of Finds Art," an unaccredited institution that grants free Masters and PhD degrees to arts students. Due to frustration that the Internal Revenue Service's categorized his art as that of a "hobbyist", preventing tax deductions for expenses), Lowell creatively considered the intersection of art and taxes with lawyer Monroe Price. In 1975, Lowell and Price organized "The Artists & Lawyers Ball" to benefit Advocates for the Arts.

In 2010, 32 years after their last election face-off, Darling once again challenged Jerry Brown in the race for governor. He has described that 2010 run as a means to raise awareness about California's requirement of a two-thirds majority to pass a budget or tax.
