= William T. Wiley =

American artist (1937–2021)

William Thomas Wiley
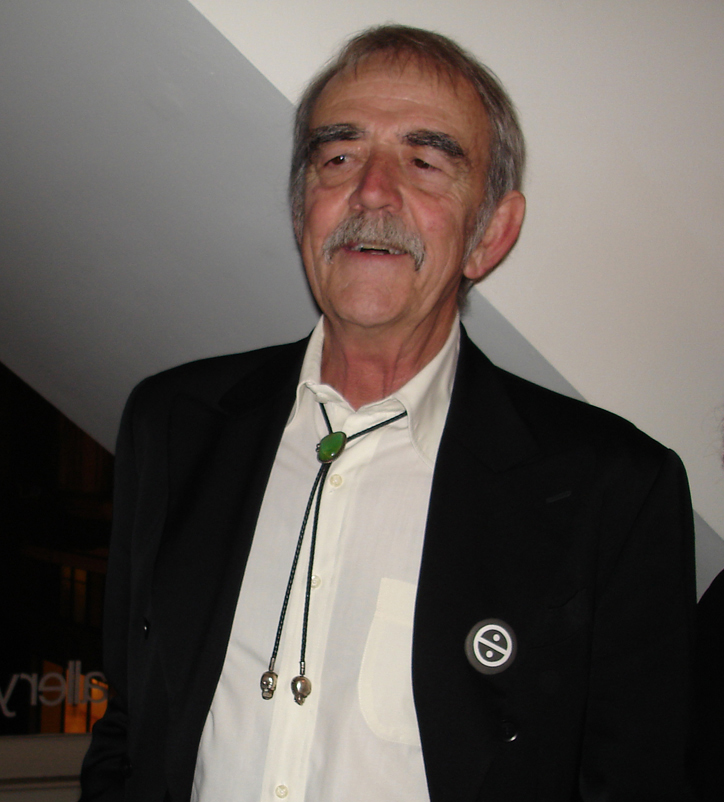
- Wiley in San Francisco (2006)
- Born: October 21, 1937; Bedford, Indiana, U.S.
- Died: April 25, 2021 (aged 83); Greenbrae, California, US
- Education: California School of Fine Arts
- Known for: drawing, painting, sculpture, film, and performance
- Awards: Purchase Prize from the Whitney Museum of American Art 1968. Honorary Doctorate at San Francisco Art Institute, San Francisco, California 1980. 2004 Guggenheim Fellowship Award.

Fan for the A.M. by William T. Wiley, 1984, acrylic paint and colored pencil on canvas, Honolulu Museum of Art

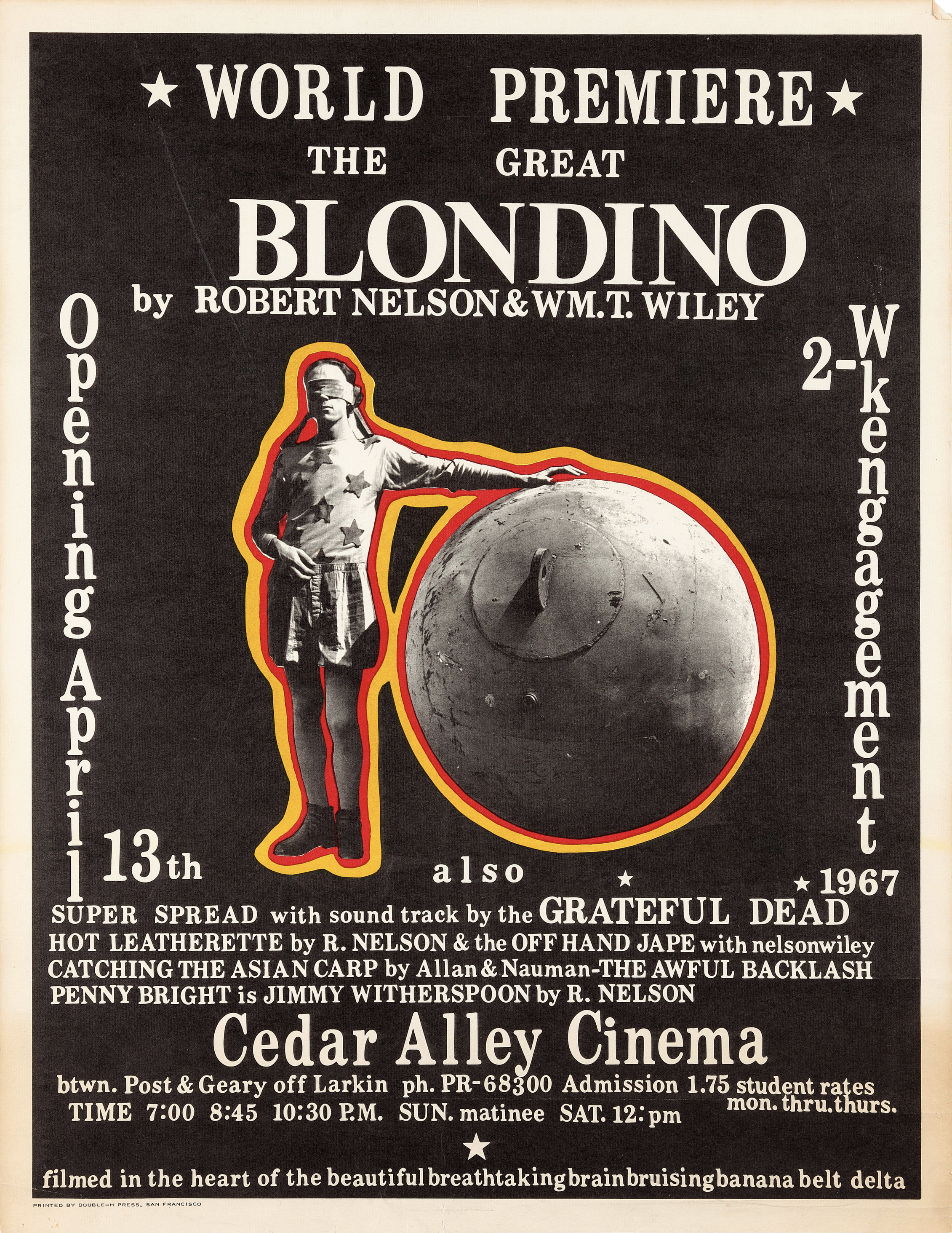
The Great Blondino (1967)

William Thomas Wiley (October 21, 1937 – April 25, 2021) was an American artist. His work spanned a broad range of media including drawing, painting, sculpture, film, performance, and pinball. At least some of Wiley's work has been referred to as funk art.

== Early life and education ==
William Thomas Wiley was born on October 21, 1937, in Bedford, Indiana. He was raised in Indiana, Texas, and in Richland, Washington.

Wiley moved to San Francisco in the 1950s to study at the California School of Fine Arts (now known as the San Francisco Art Institute); where he earned his BFA degree in 1960 and his MFA degree two years later. Wiley was classmates with Robert Hudson.

== Career ==
In 1963, Wiley joined the faculty of the University of California, Davis (U.C. Davis) art department with Bay Area Funk Movement artists Robert Arneson and Roy DeForest. During that time Wiley instructed students including Bruce Nauman, Deborah Butterfield, Stephen Laub, and Christopher Brown. According to Dan Graham, the literary, punning element of Nauman's work came from Wiley. Wiley also acknowledged the effect Nauman had on his own work.

His first solo exhibition was held at the San Francisco Museum of Modern Art in 1960. In the late 1960s Wiley collaborated with the minimalist composer Steve Reich and introduced him to Bruce Nauman.

In the 1960s, Wiley collaborated with composer Steve Reich with several performance art pieces, including "Over Evident Falls", with Wiley creating visuals to Reich's music, with both men performing the piece in front of live audiences.

Wiley continued to build upon his growing stature as a major artist with works appearing in the Venice Biennial (1980) and Whitney Biennial (1983). He also had major exhibitions at the San Francisco Museum of Modern Art (1981), M. H. de Young Memorial Museum, San Francisco (1996), and the Corcoran Gallery of Art, Washington, D.C. (2005).

Starting in the 1980s, Wiley frequently collaborated with Lippincott Sculpture to create a variety of metal fabricated artworks, including the gigantic eight story "The Tower of the No Bull Salvage", "Gong", acquired by the Manetti Shrem Museum of Art, and "Harp", part of the collection of the di Rosa Center for Contemporary Art in Napa, California.

In 2009, the Smithsonian American Art Museum presented a retrospective of Wiley's career titled What's It All Mean: William T. Wiley in Retrospect, from October 2, 2009, through January 24, 2010. A review in The Wall Street Journal stated: "Mr. Wiley's work is unlike any other in recent art... He is less a contemporary artist than a national treasure."

In 2010, the retrospective moved to the Berkeley Art Museum, from March 17 to July 18. The catalogue for the retrospective, "What's It All Mean: William T. Wiley in Retrospect", was co-published by the Smithsonian American Art Museum and University of California Press. In 2017, Wiley was the subject of a solo exhibition at the Bivins Gallery in Dallas, Texas, William T. Wiley: Where the Rub Her Meats the Rode.

In addition to his extensive work as a painter and sculptor, Wiley was a dedicated printmaker, working with Landfall Press, Crown Point Press, Cirrus Editions, Magnolia Editions, Electric Works, Trillium Press, Shark's Ink, and other printmaking companies. He also created several limited edition art books in collaboration with Arion Press where he created art for "Godot", an imaginary staging of "Waiting For Godot", and "Don Quixote, Books I and II by Miguel de Cervantes"

In 2019, Hosfelt Gallery presented William T. Wiley: Sculpture, Eyes Wear Tug Odd, which emphasized Wiley's sculptures and constructions and their relationship to his work in other mediums. In a review for Square Cylinder, David M. Roth wrote, "In all, there are 40 pieces in the show, all of them worthy of sustained contemplation and discussion. I visited the exhibition twice, and each time I left the gallery feeling as if my head were about to explode, so dense is the imagery and text contained in these works. It borders on horror vacui. Given the madness engulfing us, that approach seems right. Wiley's art, always extraordinarily prescient, now feels more relevant than ever."

Wiley's first post-humous exhibition was "Monumental" at the Hosfelt Gallery in October 2021.

In 2025, in addition to gallery exhibits at Parker Gallery, Los Angeles, and Hosfelt Gallery, San Francisco, Wiley's painting, "Shark's Dream", from the Whitney Museum's collection, was featured in the Whitney exhibition, "Sixties Surreal"

Also a singer and musician, Wiley collaborated with German composer Efdemin aka Phillip Sollmann, performing vocals on "Oh, Lovely Appearance of Death" for the 2019 album New Atlantic on the Ostgut Ton label. Fact described the project as "inspired by Francis Bacon's 17th century utopian novel of the same name and according to the label 'oscillates between fast, kaleidoscopic techno, multilayered drones and acoustic instrumentation', incorporating the sounds of Sollmann's dance floor-oriented productions as Efdemin and his more experimental work."

Wiley died on April 25, 2021, in a hospital in Greenbrae, California, due to complications of Parkinson's disease.

== Awards ==
Wiley received the Australian Arts Council traveling grant in 1980, the Guggenheim Fellowship Award in 2004, a Lifetime Achievement Award in 2005 from the Southern Graphics International Conference, and Honorary Membership in the California Society of Printmakers in 2009.

== Collections ==
Wiley is known for paintings that incorporate sketch-like drawings and handwritten notations. Fan for the A.M., in the collection of the Honolulu Museum of Art, demonstrates the artist's technique. It consists of areas of bright acrylic paint surrounded by drawings and writing in colored pencil.

Other public collections holding Wiley's work include the Di Rosa Center for Contemporary Art, Art Institute of Chicago, the Baltimore Museum of Art, the Dallas Museum of Art, Denver Art Museum, Los Angeles County Museum of Art, Minneapolis Institute of Arts, Museum of Fine Arts, Boston, Museum of Modern Art (New York), Corcoran Gallery of Art, New Britain Museum of American Art, Hirshhorn Museum, Nelson-Atkins Museum, Philadelphia Museum of Art, San Francisco Museum of Modern Art, Smithsonian American Art Museum, Van Abbemuseum (Eindhoven, Netherlands) Walker Art Center, and Whitney Museum of American Art.

Wiley was a recipient of a Guggenheim Fellowship Award in 2004.
