= David Gilhooly =

American artist (1943–2013)

- Born: David James Gilhooly III; April 15, 1943; Auburn, California, U.S.
- Died: August 21, 2013 (aged 70); Newport, Oregon, U.S.
- Education: University of California, Davis
- Spouse(s): Sheila Ann Allee (m. 1963–1982; divorce), Camille Chang (m. 1983–2013; death)
- Children: 7

‘The Windshield Sam Francis’, hand-colored etching and aquatint by David Gilhooly, 2001

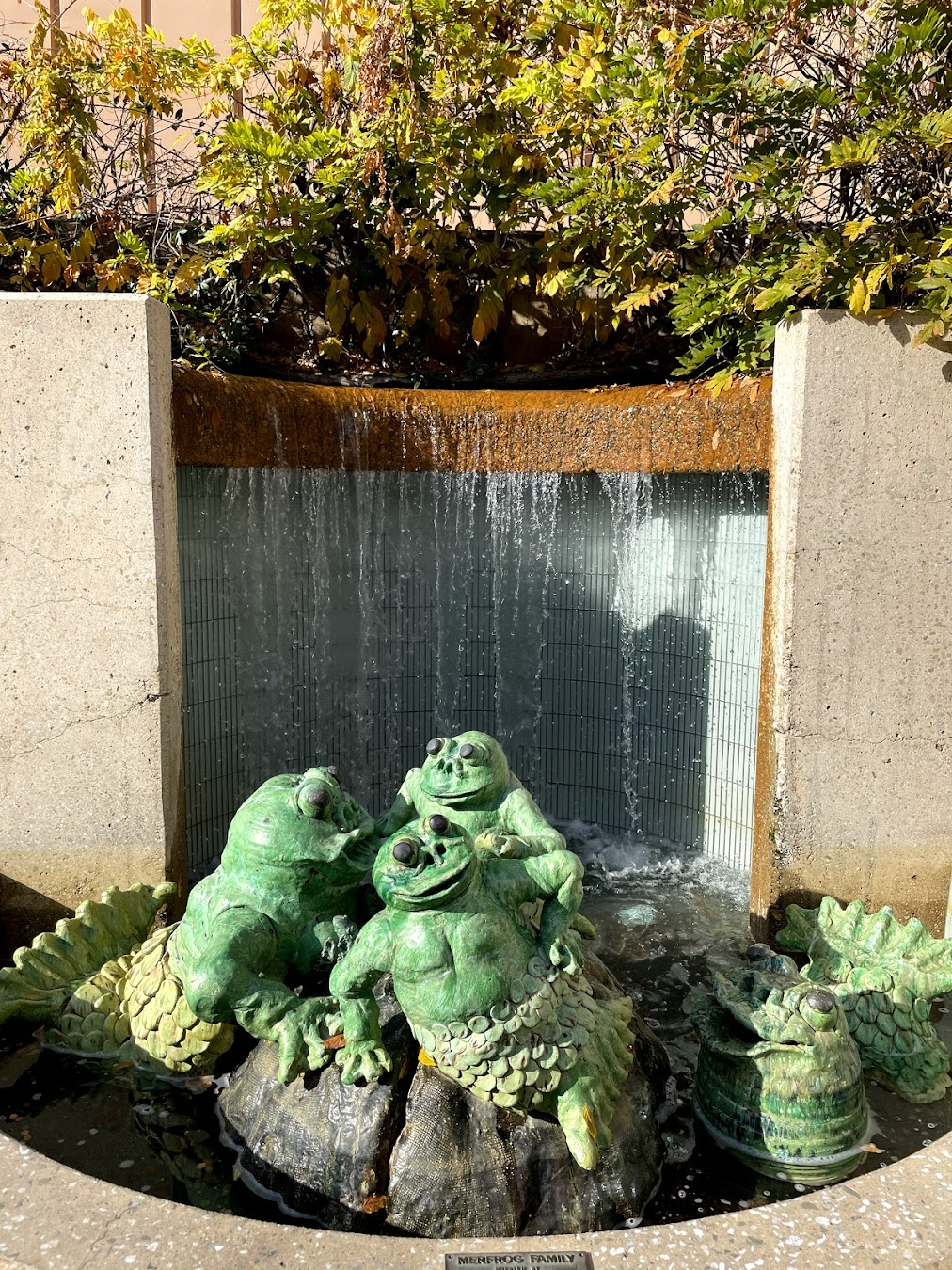
Merfrog Family (1978) public fountain by David Gilhooly

David Gilhooly RCA (also known as David James Gilhooly III; April 15, 1943 – August 21, 2013) was an American ceramicist, sculptor, painter, printmaker, and professor. He is best known for pioneering the Funk art movement. He made a series of ceramic frogs called FrogWorld, as well as ceramic food, planets, and other creatures.

== Early life ==
David James Gilhooly III was born on April 15, 1943, in Auburn, California. He was raised in Los Altos, California; Saint Croix in the Virgin Islands; and Humacao, Puerto Rico.

He enrolled in University of California, Davis (UC Davis) initially studying biology, followed by anthropology, and ending with a focus on fine art. While attending UC Davis, Gilhooly served as artist Robert Arneson's assistant starting in 1963. He graduated from UC Davis with a BA degree in 1965, and an MA degree in 1967.

== Career ==
Eight Bean Stew (1982) at the Renwick Gallery in Washington, DC in 2022

Gilhooly, together with Robert Arneson, Peter Vandenberge, Chris Unterseher, and Margaret Dodd, working together in TB-9 (temporary building 9) were what was later to be called, The Funk Ceramic Movement of the San Francisco Bay Area. David left TB-9 for one semester to become Manuel Neri's assistant and started making art out of lumber, fur, neon lights and asbestos shingles.

From 1967 to 1969, Gilhooly taught at San Jose State University (SJSU). In 1969, Gilhooly met ceramicist Victor Cicansky at UC Davis and, at his suggestion, he took a teaching position at the University of Saskatchewan in Canada (1969 to 1971). He followed this with seven years at York University, in Toronto, Canada.

In 1995, Gilhooly moved to Oregon with his second wife Camille Chang.

He was a member of the Royal Canadian Academy of Arts.

== Work ==
Gilhooly created clay objects that are satirical takes on contemporary life. Works such as his Victoria. Bathing with the Beavers (Art Gallery of Nova Scotia), might contain imperfections to mimic hobby work.

== Death and legacy ==
Gilhooly died of complications related to cancer on August 21, 2013, at his home in Newport, Oregon.

=== Collections ===
Public art collections holding works by David Gilhooly including the Art Gallery of Nova Scotia; Arizona State University Art Collections (Tempe, Arizona); the Fine Arts Museums of San Francisco; the Art Institute of Chicago; the Honolulu Museum of Art; the Jane Voorhees Zimmerli Art Museum at Rutgers University; the Little Rock Art Center (Little Rock, Arkansas); the Louisiana State University (Baton Rouge, Louisiana); the National Gallery of Canada; the Norton Museum of Art; the Oakland Museum of California; the Palm Springs Desert Museum; the Philadelphia Museum of Art; the San Antonio Museum of Art; the San Francisco Museum of Modern Art; the San Jose Museum of Art; the Anderson Collection at Stanford University; the Stedelijk Museum; the University of California, Santa Barbara (UCSB); the Vancouver Art Gallery; the Whitney Museum of American Art; and the Smithsonian American Art Museum.

=== Public art ===
Gilhooly has a public fountain made of ceramic frogs, titled Merfrog Family (1978) which was created for the Stanford Shopping Center in Stanford, California. His ceramic sculpture work Performing Frogs (1982) is located at Hult Center for the Performing Arts in Eugene, Oregon.

== Personal life ==
Gilhooly's first marriage was to Sheila Ann Allee in 1963, which ended in 1982 in divorce. Together with Allee they had four children. In 1983, he married Camille Chang and they had three children together.

== Publications ==
- Nut Pot Bag or Clay Without Tears (artist book). Authored by Jim Adamson, Robert Arneson, Clayton Bailey, Fred Bauer, Maija Peeples-Bright, Victor Cicansky, David Gilhooly, Jim Melchert, Nicholas Stephens, Chris Unterseher, Peter Vandenberge, David Zack, Lowell Darling. University of California, Davis. 1971.
