= Chicana literature =

Form of literature that has emerged from the Chicana Feminist movement

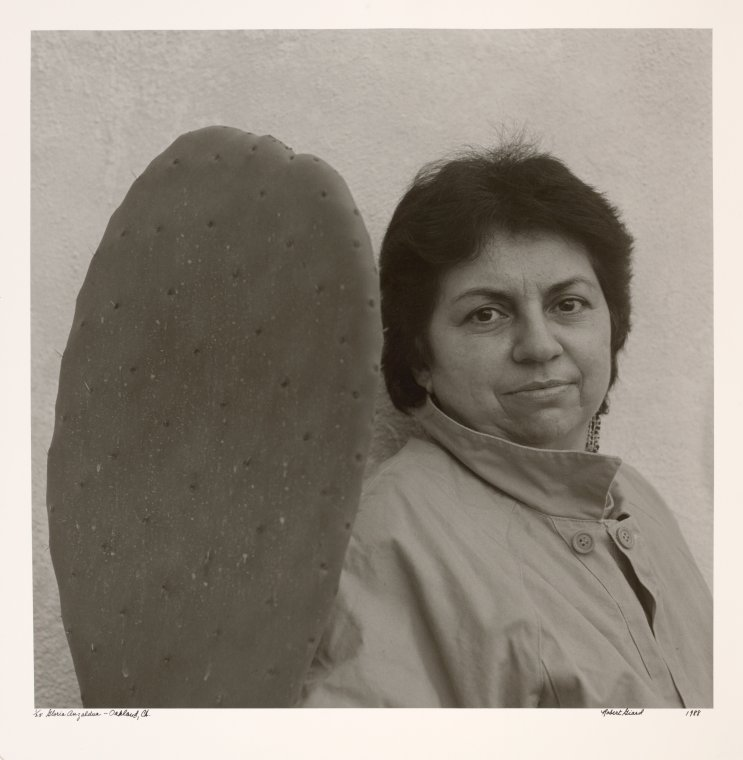
Gloria Anzaldúa. Oakland, Ca. 1988, queer Chicana poet author of Borderlands/La Frontera: The New Mestiza (1987).

Chicana literature is a form of literature that has emerged from the Chicana Feminist movement. It aims to redefine Chicana archetypes, in an effort to provide positive models for Chicanas. Chicana writers redefine their relationships with what Gloria Anzaldúa has called "Las Tres Madres" of Mexican culture (i.e. Our Lady of Guadalupe, La Malinche, and La Llorona), by depicting them as feminist sources of strength and compassion.

According to the Encyclopedia of Race, Ethnicity and Society, "Chicana feminist writings helped to develop a discourse in opposition to the Eurocentric frameworks." Chicana writing grew out of Chicana feminism, through the feminist journals founded since the 1960s – one of which led to Norma Alarcón's Third Woman Press, the assertions of Chicana feminism in essays, and the portrayal of the gender crisis in the Chicano Movement in the poetry and fiction of Chicana authors.

== Background ==
The Chicana Feminist movement, Xicanisma, originated from the exclusion of women's issues from the initial goals of the Chicano Movement. According to The Greenwood Encyclopedia of Latino Literature, it was from this beginning of the struggle [that] emerged a rich literature that erupted in poetry readings by Chicanas, theatrical companies like San Francisco's Las Cucarachas (The Cockroaches), as well as publishing houses like Lorna Dee Cervantes'* Mango and magazines like Third Woman. The term "chicana" is a word that an American women or girl coming from Mexican origin or descent.

Many writers, like Adalijiza Sosa Riddell, wrote about the experiences they had to go through, as well as the issues of the gender and sexuality, which came with the reclamation of the historical and cultural figures. According to Chicanas and El Movimiento. Chicana writing came from the feminism for the portrayal of the gender issues. With the gender issues becoming a huge part of the Chicana Movement but mainly a huge part in the literature like the Virgen de Guadalupe, she became a symbol for identify and culture for the chicana community and in south California, it was the symbol for "controlling, interpreting, or visualizing women," according to Norma Alarcon. La Virgen de Guadalupe is the saint that is used in the Catholic Church.

=== The Chicano Movement – masculine vs. feminine ===
The Chicano Movement began to emerge in the 1960s. after and in conjunction with the Civil Rights Movement (1955–65). As part of the movement, Cesar Chavez and Dolores Huerta co-founded the National Farm Workers Association, which is now known as the United Farmworkers. Chavez and Huerta organized grape strikes, non-violent protests, hunger strikes, as well as organized marches, to improve the working conditions of migrant Mexican, and Mexican-American farm-workers. Reies Lopez Tijerina later organized the Alianza Federal de Mercedes, a group which emphasized Chicano history and campaigned to restore land to those who lost it during the Mexican–American War. Rudolfo Gonzales became known for the Crusade for Justice, a movement that shifted focus from rural to urban areas and to Chicano youth, in an effort to resist assimilation and help Chicano youth accept and embrace their heritage and culture.

Masculine

The Chicano movement of the 1960s was a masculine one. In many ways, women were excluded, and it even "tended to reflectively reproduce the subordination of women." The Plan Espiritual de Aztlán (1969), which was the manifesto of the Chicano movement, was ripe with words like "brotherhood, brothers, mestizo, etc. Women were not included in the vernacular of the document. The Chicana Feminist movement was sparked, in part, by the Denver Youth Conference of 1969, which stated that, "It was the consensus of the group that the Chicana woman does not want to be liberated".

Chicana feminism

A Chicana is an American woman, or girl, of Mexican ancestry. Feminism is a movement concentrated on the belief in the equality of men and women in the societal, economical, and political sense.

"While it is true that the unity of La Raza is the basic foundation of the Chicano movement, when Chicano men talk about maintaining La Familia and the 'cultural heritage' of La Raza, they are, in fact, talking about maintaining the age-old concept of keeping the woman barefoot, pregnant, and in the kitchen. On the basis of the subordination of women, there can be no real unity. The only real unity between men and women is the unity forged in the course of struggle against their oppression. And it is by supporting, rather than opposing, the struggles of women, that Chicanos and Chicanas can genuinely unite." – Mirta Vidal, The Unity of "La Raza".

According to the New Dictionary of the History of Ideas, "There are many definitions of feminism, and many scholars, now, assert that the word should be used in its plural form, to encompass women's various social locations," and there are four ways Chicana feminism can be distinguished from other forms: history, culture, intersectionality, and political coalitions.

Chicana history is different from that of other American immigrant groups, because they have a claim of origination to the Southwest. Chicano culture determines the specific ways in which gender and sexuality are defined in Mexican-American communities. Intersectionality is the concept that Chicanas belong to more than one oppressed group – race, gender, and class. And finally, this intersectionality means that Chicanas can join with but also be rejected by many different political coalitions.

The Encyclopedia of Race, Ethnicity and Society claims that, "One of the best-known Latina feminists is Gloria Anzaldúa, author of numerous writings, including Borderlands/La Frontera: The New Mestiza. As a lesbian Chicana writer, Anzaldúa has produced work that shows the clear intersectionality of gender, sexuality, and the social construction of racial identity."

== Oppressive Chicana archetypes redefined ==
The trio of figures that writer and theorist Gloria Anzaldúa has referred to as "Our Mothers:” the Virgen de Guadalupe, La Malinche and La Llorona. These symbolic figures are of great importance to identity politics and popular culture in both Mexico and the southwest United States, and they have been used, argues theorist Norma Alarcón, as reference points "for controlling, interpreting, or visualizing women" in Mexican-American culture.

=== Our Lady of Guadalupe ===
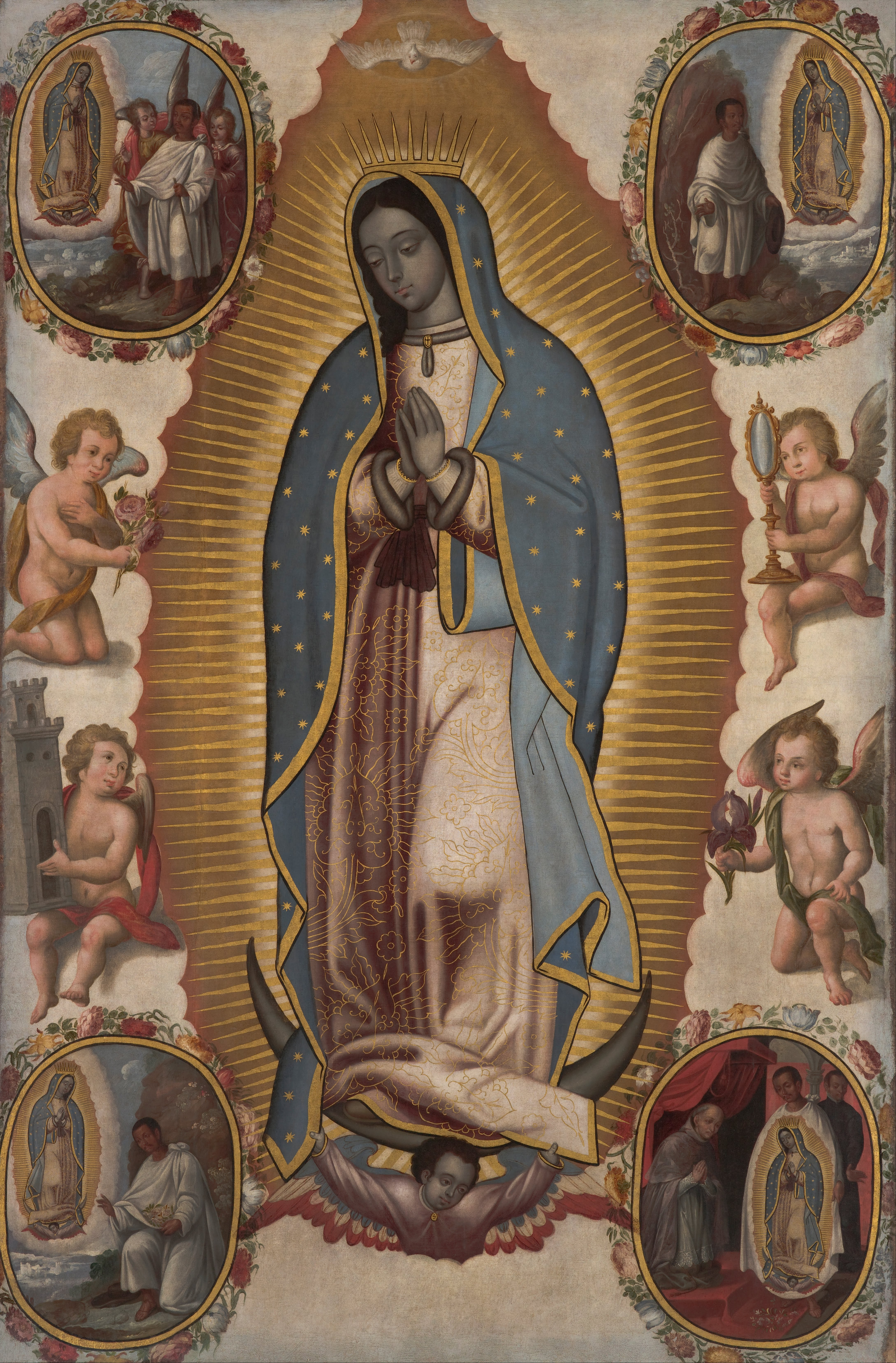
La Virgen de Guadalupe

La Virgen de Guadalupe, the patron saint of the Americas, was recognized by the Catholic Church, soon after she was discovered by an indigenous man, Juan Diego. According to the Encyclopedia of Global Religion, "During and after the conquest, Catholicism was used to justify the physical, emotional, and spiritual enslavement of the indigenous people…[who] were dehumanized and lived without hope. Popular tradition tells us that in the midst of this devastation, [Our Lady of Guadalupe] was viewed as a miracle that helped restore a dying people's dignity and desire to live."

Our Lady of Guadalupe's Role in Chicana Literature;

The Virgin de Guadalupe was created from the religion Christianity and the Aztec culture, which was national saint. In some Chicanas' works, including the well-known essay of Cherríe Moraga, Loving in the War Years, La Virgen de Guadalupe symbolizes the male repression of women's sexuality and independence. Gloria Anzaldúa has been at the forefront of efforts to revise Guadalupe, moving away from the chaste, "perfect" mother, sanctified by the Roman Catholic Church, toward a feminist, brown mother goddess.

=== La Malinche ===
La Malinche is thought to have evolved from the story of Doña Marina, or La Malinche. Doña Marina was an indigenous woman who was enslaved by the Mayas and given to Hernán Cortés during the Spanish Conquest of Mexico (1519–21). She served as his interpreter, and later bore his son, Martin, who is considered, by many, to be the first Mexican. She served use to Hernán Cortés, as she was able to speak and interpret Nahuatl. Nahuatl was the most common language among Aztecs. The Official Mexican narrative depicts Doña Marina as a traitor, and she is blamed, by many, for the fall of the Aztecs and the success of the Spanish Conquest. She was known as an Ethic traitress, supreme in her country, due to her involvement with Hernán Cortés. Although La Malinche was negatively viewed, by the greater population, few believe that she was unjustly maligned.

La Malinche's role in Chicana literature

Certain contemporary Chicana writers have taken on La Malinche, re-writing her story as one of a woman who had little choice in her role as Cortés's interpreter (she was sold to him as a slave), and who served as a "mediator between the Spanish and indigenous peoples." Chicana writers have taken the initiative to share Dona Marina's story from her perspective. In some Chicana literature, La Malinche is seen as the cultural mother. La Malinche resembles Chicanas, as she, too, was not only in two countries but also had the influence of two cultures. La Malinche was, however, not a slave of the Spaniards and ended up being one of the wealthiest and most powerful people in colonial Mexico.

=== La Llorona ===
The weeping woman: The folkloric legend of La Llorona is a story that has many variants. Generally, the story involves a woman who is scorned by a lover and in a fit of insanity or revenge, drowns her own children. Afterward, she is condemned to wander the earth, mourning her children, typically haunting by riversides. She is called La Llorona ("the weeping woman"), because she can be heard crying, loudly, in the night, lamenting her lost children.

La Llorona's role in Chicana literature

Folklore scholar Jose Limon argues that "La Llorona [is] a symbol that speaks to the course of Greater Mexican [and Chicana/o] history and does so for women, in particular, but through the idiom of women [it]also symbolizes the utopian longing [for equality and justice]'." Sandra Cisneros has used this modern La Llorona story that is "Woman Hollering Creek" to give a "voice to the violated Latina mother who struggles against domestic violence and economic and emotional dependency on men."

Traditionally, La Llorona is a treacherous figure; she kills her own children, in an act of ultimate betrayal. She is selfish; she would rather keep her lover than her children. She is insane, often depicted as a crazy woman, neglectful and abusive to her children. In some variants of the story, she doesn't kill the children but she abandons them. She is vengeful; she kills/abandons children to avenge her broken heart. Finally, she is foolish: she kills the children and regrets doing so, only when it is too late.

Chicana writers such as Sandra Cisneros, Gloria Anzaldúa, Helena Maria Viramontes and Ana Castillo "have undertaken to create not only rich and immensely variegated accounts of women's experience, but alternative versions of Chicano culture." La Llorona (la Malinche) has been re-created as a woman who stands against injustices (in race, gender, and class). In modern Llorona stories, the male lover's dishonesty is emphasized, as he is revealed as "a husband who not only deprives her of basic economic needs, but is also a slob, an emotional invalid, an adulterer, and, worst of all, a batterer". La Llorona is, now, a protective, loving mother figure, strong not victimized: "Cleofilas, the Mexican protagonist of "Woman Hollering Creek," regains her voice by transforming herself from a stereotypical Llorona figure, a weeping victim, to a Gritona, a hollering warrior".

== See also ==
- Gloria Anzaldúa
- Sandra Cisneros
- Cherrie Moraga
- Ana Castillo
- Lorna Dee Cervantes
- Sonia Gutiérrez
- Pat Mora
- Bernice Zamora
- Francisca Flores
- Yolanda López
- Norma Alarcón
- Rosario Castellanos
- Chela Sandoval
- Dorinda Moreno
- Graciela Limón
- Martha P. Cotera

== Bibliography ==
- Alarcón, Norma (1982). "Chicana's Feminist Literature: A Re-vision Through Malintzin/or Malintzin: Putting Flesh Back on the Object". In Moraga, Cherrie; Anzaldúa, Gloria (eds.). This Bridge Called My Back: Writings by Radical Women of Color. Watertown, MA: Persephone. pp. 182–189. ISBN 978-0-930436-10-0.
- Anzaldúa, Gloria (1987). Borderlands: The New Mestiza = La Frontera. San Francisco: Spinsters / Aunt Lute. ISBN 978-0-933216-25-9.
- Candelaria, Cordelia (1993). Letting La Llorona Go or Re/reading History's Tender Mercies. Vol. 7.
- Carbonell, Ana Maria (1999). "From La Llorona to Gritona: Coatlicue In Feminist Tales by Viramontes and Cisneros". MELUS. 24 (2). Oxford University Press: 53–74. doi:10.2307/467699. JSTOR 467699.
- Castañeda-Liles, Socorro (2012). Mark Juergensmeyer; Wade Clark Roof (eds.). Our Lady of Guadalupe. Vol. 2. Los Angeles: Sage Reference. ISBN 9780761927297.
- Herrera, Cristina (2014). Contemporary Chicana Literature: (Re)Writing the Maternal Script. Amherst, NY: Cambria Press. ISBN 9781604978759.
- Hurtado, Aída; Roa, Jessica M. (2005). Maryanne Cline Horowitz (ed.). Chicana Feminisms. Vol. 2. Detroit: Charles Scribner's Sons. ISBN 0-684-31377-4.
- Moraga, Cherríe (1983). Loving in the War Years: Lo Que Nunca Paso por Sus Labios. Boston: South End. ISBN 978-0896086265.
- Petty, Leslie (2000). "The 'dual'-ing Images of la Malinche and la Virgen de Guadalupe in Cisnero's The House on Mango Street". MELUS. 25 (2). Oxford University Press: 119–132. doi:10.2307/468222. JSTOR 468222.
- Pratt, Mary Louise (1993). 'Yo Soy La Malinche': Chicana writers and the poetics of ethnonationalism. Vol. 16. The Johns Hopkins University Press. pp. 859–873. doi:10.2307/2932214. JSTOR 2932214.
- Rosales, Arturo F. (2008). Nicolás Kanellos (ed.). Chicana Liberation. Vol. 1. Westport, CT: Greenwood Press. ISBN 978-0313339707.
- Schaefer, Richard T., ed. (2008). Feminism, Latina. Vol. 1. Thousand Oaks, CA: Sage Publications. ISBN 9781452265865.
