= Lorna Dee Cervantes =

American poet (born 1954)

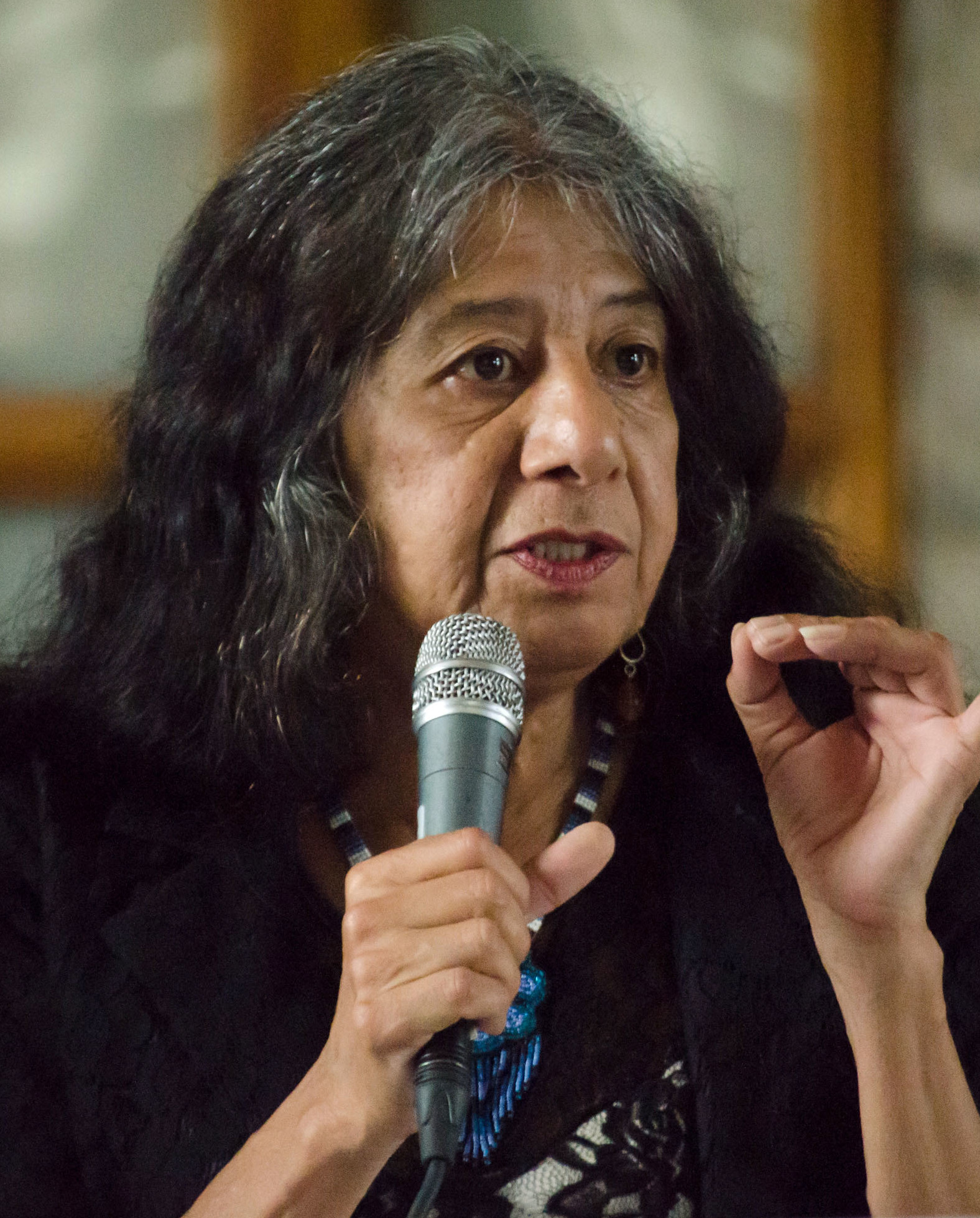
- Cervantes in 2017
- Born: August 6, 1954 (age 72); San Francisco, California, U.S.
- Education: San Jose State University; UC Santa Cruz
- Occupations: Poet, philosopher, publisher, editor, professor
- Writing career
- Notable works: From the Cables of Genocide: Poems on Love and Hunger; Emplumada
- Notable awards: American Book Award, NEA Fellowship, Pushcart Prize
- Website: lornadice.blogspot.com

Lorna Dee Cervantes (born August 6, 1954) is an American poet and activist. She is a prominent figure in Chicano poetry and has been described by Alurista as "probably the best Chicana poet active today."

== Early life ==
Cervantes was born in 1954 in the Mission District of San Francisco, and is of Mexican and Chumash ancestry. After her parents divorced when she was five, she grew up in San Jose with her mother, grandmother and brother. She grew up speaking English exclusively. This was strictly enforced by her parents, who allowed only English to be spoken at home by her and her brother. This was to avoid the racism that was occurring in her community at that time. This loss of language and a struggle to find her true identity inspired her poetry later on in life. She attended Abraham Lincoln High School. She received an Associate Arts degree from San Jose Community College in 1976 and a BA in Creative Arts from San José State University in 1984. She attended UC Santa Cruz for a PhD History of Consciousness (all but dissertation), 1984–88.

== Professional life ==
Her brother, Stephen Cervantes, had a job at a local library, so she became familiar with Shakespeare, Keats, Shelly and Byron who would have the most influence on her self-conception as a poet. Cervantes compiled her first poetry collection at age fifteen. In 1974, she traveled to Mexico City for the Quinto Festival de los Teatros Chicanos, where she performed a reading of her poem "Refugee Ship." The work addresses the cultural complexities of the Chicanx identity and was later published in her 1981 debut collection, ''Emplumada''.

Cervantes considers herself "a Chicana writer, a feminist writer, a political writer" (Cervantes). Her collections of poetry include Emplumada, From the Cables of Genocide, Drive: The First Quartet and Ciento: 100 100-Word Love Poems, and Sueño: New Poems, are held in high esteem and have attracted numerous nominations and awards.

In an interview conducted by Sonia V. Gonzalez, the poet states that, through writing and publishing, "I was trying to give back that gift that had saved me when I discovered, again, African-American women's poetry. I was having this vision of some little Chicana in San Antonio [Texas] going, scanning the shelves, like I used to do, scanning the shelves for women's names, or Spanish surnames, hoping she'll pull it out, relate to it. So it was intentionally accessible poetry, intended to bridge that gap, that literacy gap." Cervantes was actively involved in the publication of numerous Chicana/o writers from the 1970s onwards when she produced her own Chicana/o literary journal, MANGO "which was the first to publish Sandra Cisneros, Jimmy Santiago Baca, Alberto Rios, Ray Gonzalez, Ronnie Burk, and Orlando Ramírez [co-editor]. Cervantes and MANGO also championed the early work of writers Gary Soto, José Montoya, José Montalvo, José Antonio Burciaga, and her personal favourite, Luís Omar Salinas".

Cervantes has delivered poetry readings, workshops and guest lectures across the US. She was part of the Librotraficante Movement. She participated in the 2012 Librotraficante Movement, a protest against Arizona House Bill 2281, which resulted in the removal of Mexican American Studies materials from Tucson classrooms. Cervantes spoke to supporters in San Antonio in March 2012 regarding the movement's goals.

The poet was one of seven featured writers to give a reading at the American Literature Association Conference held in San Francisco in May 2012. Ciento: 100 100 Word Love Poems was nominated for a Northern California Book Award in 2012 under the poetry category.

Her fifth collection, Sueño, published in 2013 was shortlisted for the Latin American Book Award in poetry in 2014. A European launch of the collection was hosted by University College Cork, Ireland in June 2014 as part of a symposium on Pathways, Explorations, Approaches in Mexican and Mexican American Studies.

== Career ==
Cervantes began her academic career as an instructor at UC Santa Cruz from August 1985 to May 1986. She later joined the University of Colorado at Boulder, where she served as an Associate Professor of English from August 1988 until August 2007. During the 1994–1995 academic year, she was a visiting scholar at the University of Houston, followed by a lecturership in Ethnic Studies at San Francisco State University from 2006 to 2007.

Since 2007, Cervantes has worked as an independent scholar, poet, and philosopher in the San Francisco Bay Area. She returned to academia as a UC Regents Lecturer at UC Berkeley's English Department for the 2011–2012 term. Throughout her career, she has delivered over 500 poetry readings, lectures, and performances at institutions including Yale, Stanford, Harvard, and Princeton.

== Published works ==
- Sueño: New Poems SA, TX: Wings Press, 2013.
- Ciento: 100 100-Word Love Poems SA, TX: Wings Press, 2011.
- DRIVE: The First Quartet. SA, TX: Wings Press, 2006.
- From the Cables of Genocide: Poems on Love and Hunger (Arte Público Press, 1991).
- Emplumada (1981; American Book Award).
- Red Dirt (co-editor), a cross-cultural poetry journal.
- Mango (founder), a literary review.
- Unsettling America: An Anthology of Contemporary Multicultural Poetry (eds. Maria Mazziotti Gillan and Jennifer Gillan, 1994).
- No More Masks! An Anthology of Twentieth-Century Women Poets (ed. Florence Howe, 1993).
- After Aztlan: Latino Poets of the Nineties (ed. Ray González, 1992).

== Awards ==
- Patterson Prize For Poetry
- Latino Literature Prize
- Battrick Award For Poetry
- Latino Book Award
- Latin American Book Award (Second Place)
- Denver Book Award (Finalist)
- Pushcart Prize (x2)
- California Arts Council Grant for Poetry (x2)
- Hudson D. Walker Fellowship Award at The Fine Arts Work Center
- Colorado Poet Laureate (Finalist)
- Vassar Visiting Writers Award
- Mexican-American Studies Center Visiting Scholar Award
- The National Association for Chicana and Chicano Studies Scholar Award
- San Jose State University Outstanding Alumnus
- San Jose Community College Outstanding Alumnus
- The White House Third Millennium Evening with Poets Laureate Attendee (invited by President and Hillary Clinton as one of the best 100 poets in The United States)
- Library of Congress Reading (x2)
- American Book Award (1982)
- National Endowment for the Arts Fellowship Grants for Poetry (1979 and 1989)
- Lila-Wallace Reader's Digest Foundation Writer's Award (1995)

== Critical studies ==
1. Stunned Into Being: Essays on the Poetry of Lorna Dee Cervantes Edited by Rodriguez y Gibson, Eliza. San Antonio, Tx: Wings Press. 2012.
2. "Anti-Capitalist Critique and Travelling poetry in the Works of Lorna Dee Cervantes and Rage Against the Machine." By: Alexander, Donna Maria. Forum for Inter-American Research. 2012 April; 5.1.
3. "The Geography Closest In": The Space of the Chicana in the Writings of Gloria Anzaldúa and Lorna Dee Cervantes. By: Alexander, Donna Maria. Boole Library Masters Theses Collections, University College Cork. October 2010. Print.
4. "'Tat Your Black Holes into Paradise': Lorna Dee Cervantes and a Poetics of Loss." MELUS: Multiethnic Literatures of the United States. 33.1 (2008): 139-155.
5. Poetry Saved My Life: An Interview with Lorna Dee Cervantes By: González, Sonia V.; MELUS: The Journal of the Society for the Study of the Multi-Ethnic Literature of the United States, 2007 Spring; 32 (1): 163-80.
6. Poetry as Mother Tongue? Lorna Dee Cervantes's Emplumada By: Scheidegger, Erika. IN: Rehder and Vincent, American Poetry: Whitman to Present. Tübingen, Germany: Narr Franke Attempto; 2006. pp. 193–208
7. The Shape and Range of Latina/o Poetry: Lorna Dee Cervantes and William Carlos Williams By: Morris-Vásquez, Edith; Dissertation, U of California, Riverside, 2004.
8. Loss and Recovery of Memory in the Poetry of Lorna D. Cervantes By: González, Sonia V.; Dissertation, Stanford U, 2004.
9. Lorna Dee Cervantes (1954-) By: Harris-Fonseca, Amanda Nolacea. IN: West-Durán, Herrera-Sobek, and Salgado, Latino and Latina Writers, I: Introductory Essays, Chicano and Chicana Authors; II: Cuban and Cuban American Authors, Dominican and Other Authors, Puerto Rican Authors. New York, NY: Scribner's; 2004. pp. 195–207
10. "Imagining a Poetics of Loss: Toward a Comparative Methodology." By: Rodriguez y Gibson, Eliza. Studies in American Indian Literatures. 2nd ser. 15.3/4 (2003/2004): 23–51.
11. Memphis Minnie, Genocide, and Identity Politics: A Conversation with Alex Stein By: Stein, Alex; Michigan Quarterly Review, 2003 Fall; 42 (4): 631–47.
12. "Love, Hunger, and Grace: Loss and Belonging in the Poetry of Lorna Dee Cervantes and Joy Harjo." By: Rodriguez y Gibson, Eliza. Legacy 19.1 (2002):106-114.
13. "Remembering We Were Never Meant to Survive": Loss in Contemporary Chicana and Native American Feminist Poetics By: Rodríguez y Gibson, Eliza; Dissertation, Cornell U, 2002.
14. Love, Hunger, and Grace: Loss and Belonging in the Poetry of Lorna Dee Cervantes and Joy Harjo. By: Rodriguez y Gibson, Eliza; Legacy: A Journal of American Women Writers, 2002; 19 (1): 106–14.
15. Chicana Ways: Conversations with Ten Chicana Writers By: Ikas, Karin Rosa (ed.), Reno, NV: U of Nevada P; 2002.
16. I Trust Only What I Have Built with My Own Hands: An Interview with Lorna Dee Cervantes By: González, Ray; Bloomsbury Review, 1997 Sept-Oct; 17 (5): 3, 8.
17. Bilingualism and Dialogism: Another Reading of Lorna Dee Cervantes's Poetry By: Savin, Ada. IN: Arteaga, An Other Tongue: Nation and Ethnicity in the Linguistic Borderlands. Durham, NC: Duke UP; 1994. pp. 215–23
18. "An Utterance More Pure Than Word": Gender and the Corrido Tradition in Two Contemporary Chicano Poems. By: McKenna, Teresa. IN: Keller and Miller, Feminist Measures: Soundings in Poetry and Theory. Ann Arbor, MI: U of Michigan P; 1994. pp. 184–207
19. Divided Loyalties: Literal and Literary in the Poetry of Lorna Dee Cervantes, Cathy Song and Rita Dove By: Wallace, Patricia; MELUS, 1993 Fall; 18 (3): 3–19.
20. Lorna Dee Cervantes's Dialogic Imagination By: Savin, Ada; Annales du Centre de Recherches sur l'Amérique Anglophone, 1993; 18: 269–77.
21. Tres momentos del proceso de reconocimiento en la voz poética de Lorna D. Cervantes By: Alarcón, Justo S.. IN: López González, Malagamba, and Urrutia, Mujer y literatura mexicana y chicana: Culturas en contacto, II. Mexico City; Tijuana: Colegio de México; Colegio de la Frontera Norte; 1990. pp. 281–285
22. Lorna Dee Cervantes (August 6, 1954 - ) By: Fernández, Roberta. IN: Lomelí and Shirley, Chicano Writers: First Series. Detroit, MI: Gale; 1989. pp. 74–78
23. Chicana Literature from a Chicana Feminist Perspective By: Yarbro-Bejarano, Yvonne. IN: Herrera-Sobek and Viramontes, Chicana Creativity and Criticism: Charting New Frontiers in American Literature. Houston: Arte Publico; 1988. pp. 139–145
24. La búsqueda de la identidad en la literatura chicana/tres textos By: Alarcón, Justo S.; Confluencia: Revista Hispanica de Cultura y Literatura, 1987 Fall; 3 (1): 137–143.
25. Chicana Literature from a Chicana Feminist Perspective By: Yarbro-Bejarano, Yvonne; The Americas Review: A Review of Hispanic Literature and Art of the USA, 1987 Fall-Winter; 15 (3-4): 139–145.
26. Notes toward a New Multicultural Criticism: Three Works by Women of Color By: Crawford, John F.. IN: Harris and Aguero, A Gift of Tongues: Critical Challenges in Contemporary American Poetry. Athens: U of Georgia P; 1987. pp. 155–195
27. Bernice Zamora y Lorna Dee Cervantes: Una estética feminista By: Bruce-Novoa; Revista Iberoamericana, 1985 July-Dec.; 51 (132-133): 565–573.
28. Emplumada: Chicana Rites-of-Passage By: Seator, Lynette; MELUS, 1984 Summer; 11 (2): 23–38.
29. Soothing Restless Serpents: The Dreaded Creation and Other Inspirations in Chicana Poetry By: Rebolledo, Tey Diana; Third Woman, 1984; 2 (1): 83–102.
30. Interview with Lorna Dee Cervantes By: Monda, Bernadette; Third Woman, 1984; 2 (1): 103–107.

== See also ==
- List of Mexican American writers
- List of writers from peoples Indigenous to the Americas
- Latino poetry
- Latino Literature
