= Theresa Hak Kyung Cha: Multiple Offerings =

2026 retrospective exhibition and monograph book

Theresa Hak Kyung Cha: Multiple Offerings is a 2026 retrospective exhibition of Theresa Hak Kyung Cha's work hosted by the Berkeley Art Museum and Pacific Film Archive, as well as a monograph book published by DelMonico Books. It is the second retrospective exhibition dedicated to Cha since 2001, and as of 2026, it is the largest show of her work ever.

The show debuted at BAMPFA and was scheduled to run from January 24 to April 19, 2026. It is due to show at Artists Space in New York City and other venues thereafter.

== Exhibition ==
Since 1992, BAMPFA has housed Cha's art, archives, and other relevant documentation; Cha had spent eight years at the surrounding University of California, Berkeley, where she earned a total of four degrees and worked at BAMPFA's precursor institutions: the Pacific Film Archive and the University Art Museum.

Curated from that collection by Victoria Sung with assistance from Tausif Noor, the show includes several of Cha's multimodal works ranging from text to film, as well as ephemera from her time at Berkeley; documentation of her creative process behind both finished and unfinished works; and miscellaneous archival materials from her life and career. The show also includes works by other artists, like Na Mira and Cecilia Vicuña, made in conversation with Cha's.

In addition to the show, BAMPFA curated a program series dedicated to Cha's legacy, including film screenings, a symposium day, a series of events and performances, and a marathon reading of Dictee.

In showcasing a diversity of Cha's work created across decades, Sung wanted to deemphasize the domineering presence of Dictee to Cha's legacy, instead spotlighting "how she would rethink themes over and over again, in different forms, so that one idea in the early 1970s is revisited in the early 1980s."

== Monograph ==
Published by DelMonico Books in 2026 following BAMPFA's retrospective exhibition, the monograph book consists of previously never-before-seen work and archival material from Cha's career. Edited by Sung, it also includes an introduction by Sung; essays by Julia Bryan-Wilson, Jordan Carter, Danielle A. Jackson, Mason Leaver-Yap, and Tausif Noor; and a conversation between Na, Cici Wu, and Min Sun Jeon. The book was designed by Ben Schwartz.

== Critical reception ==
Hyperallergic said that the show "humanizes an artist who has become larger than life, sometimes overshadowed by her horrific murder and the gravity of the themes of forced migration, dislocation, and exile that she explored in her work."

KQED concluded that Cha tackled "Distance, displacement, memory, grief...from as many angles as possible, and sometimes from every angle at once. It’s an approach, an offering, that still feels instructive, even 44 years after her death."

ArtReview stated that "In these contemporary homages, the full force of Cha’s work—its spectrality, pallor and ungovernable tremor—feels distant. Even amid all these eulogies, Cha evades us."

The Guardian said that "To stand within the galleries of Multiple Offerings is to feel an inspiration that comes from the excitement and openness of an art world that in many ways feels distant from today, one in which a Korean immigrant could spend nearly a decade at a public university and make art that no one had ever seen before."
