= Jim Melchert =

American artist (1930–2023)

- Born: James Frederick Melchert; December 2, 1930; New Bremen, Ohio, U.S.
- Died: June 1, 2023 (aged 92); Oakland, California, U.S.
- Education: Princeton University, University of Chicago, University of California, Berkeley
- Known for: Ceramics, fine art
- Movement: Funk art
- Spouse: Mary Ann Hostetler
- Children: 3

Jim Melchert (né James Frederick Melchert; December 2, 1930 – June 1, 2023) was an American visual artist, arts administrator, and professor. He is known for his ceramics and sculptures. Melchert was part of the Funk art movement.

Melchert helped elevate ceramics into mainstream contemporary art by challenging the medium's traditions of expression, form, and function and was often described as "the great philosopher of the post-war craft movement." He was connected with the California Clay Movement (or American Clay Revolution) that came out of California in the 1950s. Melchert's teacher, and later colleague, Peter Voulkos was central to this school of ceramic art which was part of a larger transition in crafts from "designer-craftsman" to "artist-craftsman."

== Early life and education ==
James Frederick Melchert was born on December 2, 1930, in New Breman, Ohio. His parents were Hulda Egli and Rev. John Carl Melchert, and he had two older brothers. He graduated in 1948 from Mansfield High School in Mansfield, Ohio.

After earning an AB in art history from Princeton University in 1952, he moved to Japan where he taught English for four years after he declared himself a conscientious objector to the Korean War. Upon returning to the United States, he earned postgraduate degrees in painting at the University of Chicago (1957), and studied ceramics under Peter Voulkos at the University of California, Berkeley (1961).

== Career ==
Throughout his career, Melchert worked with many media, including painting, drawing, performance art, film, and most notably sculpture and ceramics. His unique process involves breaking down, drawing on, and reassembling ceramic tiles before painting the new constructions with glaze.

His "near-legendary performance" Changes in which he and nine Dutch artists immersed their heads in clay slip and sat upright on a bench until it dried was performed in Amsterdam in 1972. The film of the performance is in museum collections including Stedelijk Museum and BAMPFA.

He taught at San Francisco Art Institute from 1961 to 1965; and the University of California, Berkeley from 1965 to 1992. Theresa Hak Kyung Cha was one of his notable students at UC Berkeley.

From 1977 until 1981, Melchert served as the director of Visual Arts Program for the National Endowment for the Arts (NEA). From 1984 until 1988, he was the director of the American Academy in Rome. During his term in Rome, many notable artists were in residence, including Ana Mendieta, Alex Katz, Vito Acconci, Bruce Nauman, and Judy Pfaff.

== Death ==
Melchert died at his Oakland, California, home on June 1, 2023, at the age of 92, of complications from a stroke he suffered in April. He had three children.

== Legacy ==
As part of the Nanette L. Laitman Documentation Project for Craft and Decorative Arts in America, Melchert donated his papers to the Smithsonian’s Archive of American Arts in 2004 and 2019–2021. His work is held by over two dozen collections, including the Rhode Island School of Design Museum, The Museum of Arts and Design and Los Angeles County Museum of Art.

In 2025, Griff Williams, wrote the first monograph to document Melchert's esteemed career. The book, Where the Boundaries Are, includes essays by Sequoia Miller, Tanya Zimbardo, and Maria Porges. A traveling museum retrospective with the same name and curated by Williams premiered at DiRosa Center for Contemporary Art.

In 2026, Melchert's work was included in the exhibition Theresa Hak Kyung Cha Multiple Offerings at BAMPFA.

== Collections ==
- San Francisco Museum of Modern Art
- Metropolitan Museum of Art
- Stedelijk Museum Amsterdam
- Los Angeles County Museum of Art

== Publications ==
- Nut Pot Bag or Clay Without Tears (artist book). Authored by Jim Adamson, Robert Arneson, Clayton Bailey, Fred Bauer, Maija Peeples-Bright, Victor Cicansky, David Gilhooly, Jim Melchert, Nicholas Stephens, Chris Unterseher, Peter Vandenberge, David Zack, Lowell Darling. University of California, Davis. 1971.
- Miller, Sequoia (2015). The Ceramic Presence in Modern Art: Selections from the Linda Leonard Schlenger Collection and the Yale University Art Gallery. Yale University Art Gallery. ISBN 978-0300214406.
- Spinozzi, Adrienne (2021). Shapes From Out of Nowhere: Ceramics from the Robert A. Ellison Jr. Collection. August Editions. ISBN 978-1947359062.
- Williams, Griff. Jim Melchert: Where the Boundaries Are. Essays by Sequoia Miller, Tanya Zimbardo, Renny Pritikin, and Maria Porges. Oro Editions. Gallery 16. 2025. ISBN 978-0-9827671-8-4
