= Dictee =

1982 poetry collection by Theresa Hak Kyung Cha

Dictée
- 1st ed, Tanam Press (1982)
- Author: Theresa Hak Kyung Cha
- Language: English, French
- Subject: a classic work of autobiography
- Published: 1982
- Publisher: Tanam Press
- Media type: softcover
- Pages: 179
- ISBN: 978-0-934378-09-3

Dictée is a 1982 book by Korean American author Theresa Hak Kyung Cha. Considered to be Cha's magnum opus, the book, a genre-bending poetry collection, focuses on several women: the Korean revolutionary Yu Gwan Soon, Joan of Arc, Saint Thérèse of Lisieux, Demeter and Persephone, Cha's mother Hyun Soon Huo, and Cha herself. All these women are linked by their struggles and the way that nations have affected and twisted their lives.

== Publication history ==
The book was first published in 1982, the year Cha was murdered. The book was out of print for a while, but due in part to the publication of an edited collection on her novel, Writing Self, Writing Nation (1994), Cha's work began to receive critical attention. In 1997, with the resurgence of Asian American studies and Third-wave feminism, the book was brought back into print by Norma Alarcón and Third Woman Press.

- — (1982). Dictee (1st, pb ed.). New York: Tanam Press. ISBN 9780934378109.
- — (1994). Dictee. Berkeley: Third Woman Press. ISBN 978-0-943219-12-7.
- — (2001). Dictee. Berkeley: University of California Press. ISBN 978-0-520-23112-2.
- — (2009). Dictee (2nd ed.). Berkeley: University of California Press. ISBN 978-0-520-26129-7.

== Genre ==
Critics contend that Dictée, though considered a novel, is difficult to define by genre. It has an unorthodox structure, and consists of descriptions of the struggle to speak, uncaptioned photographs, tellings of the lives of saints and patriots, and mysterious letters that seem not to relate to the other material. Cha "borrows from avant garde and film editing techniques such as jagged cuts, jump shots, and visual exposition", based on her experience in the video and performing arts. The work "deviates from genres, themes, and styles" and fails to fit a single descriptor or label with clarity. It has been described as auto-ethnography, due to its highly subjective view of heritage and the past. "It is part autobiography, part biography, part personal diary, part ethnography, part auto-ethnography, part translation. And all these genres are presented with an intertextual mix of photographs, quotations, translations, and language so as to create a history. Cha's move in Dictée is to collage multiple voices American, European, and Asian---so as to build a history". Cha uses a lot of photographs to engage the reader and create a certain atmosphere. Dictee is composed of various genres, such as autobiography, fiction, history, and poetry and this diversity not only reflects on genre, but also on culture and language.

Cha criticizes the prejudice towards and oppression of women, which greatly affects the genre. She “not only challenge[s] the traditional autobiographic ethnic mode," but "also disturbs the reader’s expectations by breaking down the boundaries between genres and playing with them”. The narrator's fragmented memories suggest an ambiguous Korean identity contending with the presence of an awkwardly fashioned American one.

== Structure and critical observations ==
Dictée is organized into nine parts, a structure that arises from the nine Greek muses. These include Clio, Calliope, Urania, Melpomene, Erato, Elitere, Thalia, Terpischore, and Polymnia. The nine muses are the titles of nine chapters of Dictee. Cha's use of nine muses is derived from Hesiod, who first used them. But Cha's employment is a subversive revision because of her "feminist intervention and patriarchal order." The catalogue of nine muses Cha examines with nine women characters, vary widely from "Greek goddesses to a Korean shamanistic matriarch and from historical figures to fictional ones". The meaning of the muses is shown with nine women who all reject patriarchal roles and cannot have a voice for themselves for different reasons, because of unhappy marriage, exile, turbulence and immigration. At the end of chapter "POLYMNIA SACRED POETRY", Cha writes "Tenth, a Circle within a circle, a series of concentric circles"(Cha 175). Cha uses this image to describe how the women always come together and the child becomes the mother and the mother will have a child and it is like a circle, a life circle for women. At the same time, trauma from the mother's generation is always passed on to the next generation. So this circle is both physical and mental.

The novel is mainly written in English and French, but some Korean and Chinese characters can be seen in the pictures posed to support the text. Unexplained Chinese characters as well as Korean words lead to incomprehension visually and linguistically. Cha wants to keeps a realist ideal of equivalence and deliberately get rid of the sense of foreignness without extra translation, though these characters stand outside the textual order, instead, they create "self-contained diatinction and feeling of otherness". Cha didn't want to disturb readers’ reading experience by doing this—on the contrary, she wanted the readers to join her. For the Korean people, the process of reading this book was to call on them to resist the colonial ambitions of Japan. So this book could be called a book with a history of blood and tears.

The stories of the women in the book (including Yu Guan Soon, Joan of Arc, Saint Thérèse of Lisieux, and her mother Hyun Soon Huo) focus on patriotism and exile identity. Cha's purpose of using multimedia and how do visual elements is to attract the readers' attention in different approaches. Though it is uncaptioned, the photograph of Cha's biological mother, Hyung Soon Huo, conveys the ways the past speaks to "escape the capture of discursive language" with this historical character. And in a deep sense, it also "clear[s] a way for what Dictée understands as the necessary reply to not repeat history in oblivion". She also uses a still from the silent French movie called The Passion of Joan of Arc to give readers a direct concept of what is going on in the text. So readers could think about the reliability of narration and focalization, multimedia and art, the ambiguity and authenticity in photography taking, and the boundary between fiction and nonfiction.

Critics have read the book as a social discourse, aiming at informing the readers of the world about the history of the Japanese Colonial Period. The trauma suggested is also the product of nationalism, patriarchal forces, and colonialism during that period. What's more, it also shows the struggles that Asian Americans have been through in terms of their culture identity. Cha managed to call the public's attention to this kind of special group; at the same time, she also invites those who have the same experience or background to find their own cultural identity.

Dictée is known for its unique print format and typographic design, using untranslated French, Korean, Chinese, collage and fragmented text in the book. In line with the title, much of the book is also written in strict accordance with the dictation format. Cha's Dictée carries it out of melancholia into mourning, by working through multiple personal and political traumas as an outstanding work of postmodernity.

== Reviews and criticism ==
When Dictée was originally published in 1982 it received average reviews. Contemporary reviews for Dictée have been rather positive, with Carole Maso quoted in Spin Magazine commenting, "Dictée enlarges the notion of what a book is ... because it is ephemeral, fragile, fierce, and indelible, because it is subversive, because it yearns and is luminous." Dictée is now a common part of the curriculum in feminist or Asian-American studies.

== Historical context ==
Dictée mainly encompasses two periods, the Japanese Colonization of Korea (1910-1945) and Liberation, Division and the Korean War (1945-1953).

In 1919, Korean nationalists drafted and distributed a declaration of Korea's independence and planned a large demonstration. To recruit a large number of people for the demonstration, they turned the funeral for King Kojong into a protest against the Japanese. "Demonstrations supporting the declaration of independence quickly spread throughout the country. It is estimated that more than a million of Korea's 20 million people participated in street demonstrations." This movement is called the March 1st Movement. Women and children were beaten and killed by the police and soldiers. Yu Guan Soon, who was a Korean student and an organizer of the March 1 Movement, "passed out copies of the declaration and led demonstrations in her hometown area south of Seoul. She was arrested, imprisoned, and tortured, and after a year she died in prison."

Japan used a variety of policies to control and assimilate Korea since 1930s, especially through education. "In 1934 Ugaki introduced a new curriculum in Korean schools that featured increased instruction in Japanese language, ethics, and history. The new curriculum eliminated the study of Korean and the use of Korean in general instruction. Eventually, the colonial government would insist that only the Japanese language be used in all public offices, and by the 1940s all businesses and banks were forced to keep records exclusively in Japanese."

After the end of World War II, Japan lost the war and control of Korea. However, Soviet and U.S. troops moved into Korea from the north and south and occupied the country after Japan left. "The responsible bodies in Washington suggested to the President that the Japanese forces north of the 38th parallel surrender to the Soviet forces and those south of the 38th parallel surrender to the US forces. The two colonels who had prepared the decisions — one of them being the later Secretary of State Dean Rusk — had chosen the 38th parallel because it left the capital Seoul under US control.3 This line had already been mentioned in internal discussions of the US military at Potsdam when they had envisaged the military occupation of Korea for the first time. The suggestion to choose the 38th parallel as dividing line became part of an instruction, approved by the President, to General MacArthur, Commander-in-Chief of the Allied Forces. This instruction was also communicated to the British and Soviet government." "The 38th parallel was considered to be a temporary line to fix military responsibilities. Therefore, it has been called a "military expedient". Yet, once Soviet troops had entered the northern part of Korea, facts were established which could not be removed." Two different governments were established under Soviet and American support, leading to conflict. On June 25, 1950, the Korean War started. The North Korean Army with China's help and the South Korea Army with American support started a war in the Korean Peninsula. The war ended on July 27, 1953.
