= The House on Mango Street =

1983 novel by Sandra Cisneros

- First edition cover
- Author: Sandra Cisneros
- Cover artist: Alejandro Romero
- Language: English
- Published: 1984
- Publisher: Arte Público Press
- Publication place: United States
- Media type: Print (hardcover, paperback, & library binding), audio cassette, and audio CD
- Pages: 103 (1st edition, paperback)
- ISBN: 978-0329073725 (1st edition, paperback)
- Dewey Decimal: 813/.54 20
- LC Class: PS3553.I78 H6 1991

The House on Mango Street is a 1983 novel by the Mexican-American author Sandra Cisneros. Structured as a series of vignettes, it tells the story of Esperanza Cordero, a 12-year-old Chicana girl growing up in the Hispanic quarter of Chicago. Based in part on Cisneros's own experience, the novel follows Esperanza over the span of one year as she enters adolescence and begins to face the realities of life as a young woman in a poor and patriarchal community. Elements of the Mexican-American culture and themes of social class, race, sexuality, identity, and gender are interwoven throughout the novel.

The House on Mango Street is considered a modern classic of Chicano literature and has been the subject of numerous academic publications in Chicano studies and feminist theory. The book has sold more than 7 million copies, has been translated into over 20 languages, and is required reading in many schools and universities across the United States.

It was on The New York Times Best Seller list and is the recipient of several major literary awards, including the American Book Award from the Before Columbus Foundation. It was adapted into a stage play by Tanya Saracho, which was staged in Chicago in 2009.

Because the novel deals with sensitive subject matters, such as domestic violence, puberty, sexual harassment, and racism, it has faced challenges and threats of censorship. In spite of this, it remains an influential coming-of-age novel and is a staple piece of literature for many young adults.

== Background ==
Cisneros has discussed the relationship between her own personal experiences and Esperanza's life, as depicted in The House on Mango Street. Like her protagonist, Esperanza, Cisneros is Mexican-American and was born and raised in a Hispanic neighborhood in Chicago, yet, there are differences. For instance, where Esperanza has two brothers and a sister, Cisneros was "the only daughter in a family of seven children". Earlier, Cisneros suggested that as the only girl in a family of boys, she often felt isolated. Cisneros attributes "her impulse to create stories" to "the loneliness of those formative years".

While completing an MFA in creative writing at the Iowa Writers Workshop, Cisneros first discovered a sense of her own ethnic "otherness,” and at this time, she felt marginalized "as a person of color, as a woman, and as a person from working-class background". In an interview, Cisneros stated that during her graduate studies, when she began writing The House on Mango Street, she found the academic atmosphere highly discouraging. She remembered finding her classmates' backgrounds very different than her own and realized she had little in common with them: "I was so angry, so intimidated by my classmates that I wanted to quit. But ... I found a way to write … in reaction to being there, I started to have some Mango Street, almost as a way of claiming this is who I am. It became my flag". Cisneros created Esperanza from these personal feelings of displacement.

== Synopsis ==
The House on Mango Street covers the formative years of Esperanza Cordero, a young Chicana girl living in an impoverished Chicago neighborhood with her parents and three siblings. Before settling into their new home, a small and run-down building with crumbling red bricks, the family moved, frequently, always dreaming of having a house of their own. When they finally arrive at the house on Mango Street, it is not the promised land of their dreams, but Esperanza's parents claim that Mango Street is only a temporary stop, before they reach the promised house. While a significant improvement from her family's previous dwellings, Esperanza expresses disdain towards her new home, because it is not a "real" house like the ones she has seen on TV. Pining for a white, wooden house with a big yard and many trees, Esperanza finds her life on Mango Street suffocating and yearns to escape. She begins to write poetry, to express these feelings. Esperanza begins the novel, with detailed descriptions of the minute behaviors and characteristics of her family members and unusual neighbors, providing a picture of the neighborhood and examples of the many influential people surrounding her. She describes time spent with her younger sister, Nenny, and two older girls she befriends in the neighborhood, including Alicia, a promising young college student with a dead mother, and Marin, who spends her days babysitting her younger cousins. Esperanza highlights significant or telling moments, both in her own life and those in her community, mostly explaining the hardships they face, such as her neighbor being arrested for stealing a car or the death of her Aunt Lupe.

As the vignettes progress, Esperanza matures and develops her own perspective of the world around her. Esperanza, eventually, enters puberty and changes sexually, physically, and emotionally, beginning to notice and enjoy male attention. She befriends Sally, an attractive girl who wears heavy makeup and provocative clothing and who is physically abused and forbidden from leaving her home by her strongly religious father. Sally's and Esperanza's friendship is compromised, when Sally ditches Esperanza for a boy at a carnival, leaving Esperanza to be sexually assaulted by a group of men. She recounts other instances of assault she has faced, like an older man forcibly kissing her at her first job. Esperanza's traumatic experiences and observations of the women in her neighborhood, many of whom are controlled by the men in their lives, only further cement her desire to leave Mango Street. It is only when she meets Rachel and Lucy's aunts, who tell her fortune, that she realizes her experiences on Mango Street have shaped her identity and will remain with her, even if she leaves. As the novel ends, Esperanza vows that after she leaves, she will return, to help the people she has left behind.

== Structure ==
The novel is composed of 44 interconnected vignettes, of varying lengths, ranging from one or two paragraphs to several pages. The protagonist, Esperanza, narrates these vignettes in first-person present tense.

In the afterword, for the 25th-anniversary publication of The House on Mango Street, Cisneros commented on the style she developed for writing it: "She experiments, creating a text that is as succinct and flexible as poetry, snapping sentences into fragments so that the reader pauses, making each sentence serve her and not the other way round, abandoning quotation marks to streamline the typography and make the page as simple and readable as possible." Cisneros wanted the text to be easily read by people like those she remembered from her youth, particularly people who spent all day working, with little time to devote to reading. In her words: "I wanted something that was accessible to ... someone who comes home with their feet hurting like my father."

In 2009, Cisneros wrote a new introduction to the novel. Here, she includes a few remarks on the process of writing the book. She had first come up with the title "The House on Mango Street;” under it, she included several stories, poems, and vignettes that she had already written or was in the process of writing. She adds that she does not consider the book a novel but a "jar of buttons," a group of mismatched stories. These stories were written over different periods; the first three were written in Iowa, as a side project, while Cisneros was studying for a MFA. When orchestrating this book, Cisneros wanted it to be "a book that can be opened at any page and will still make sense to the reader who doesn't know what came before or comes after." She says the people she wrote about were real, amalgamations of persons she met over the years. She tailored together events of the past and the present, so that the story being told could have a beginning, a middle, and an end, and that all the emotions felt are hers.

== Characters ==
Esperanza Cordero – The House on Mango Street is written through the eyes of Esperanza Cordero, who is an adolescent girl living in a working-class Latino neighbourhood in Chicago. Esperanza is intrigued by the idea of being a Mexican American woman in Chicago, which reflects the author, herself, just 15 years prior to publishing this book. We follow this young woman coming into her sexual maturity and observe her undying struggle to make new possibilities for herself. The reader also encounters Esperanza living between two cultures, including the Mexican one, which she encounters through her parents, and the American culture, which she finds herself living. Throughout the book, we see Esperanza reject her Chicana community, as a means to forge and establish her own identity.

As her name suggests, Esperanza is a "figure of hope, a 'fierce woman,' on a complex pursuit for personal and community transformation." Esperanza uses her house in Chicago to question her society and the cultural customs that weigh on her, due to her identity as a young Chicana woman. She observes the women of her community, to find a role model of her own, and she looks at both their negative and positive aspects and uses what she has learned from her observations, to form an identity for herself.

Magdalena "Nenny" Cordero – She is Esperanza's youngest sister. The protagonist mentions that they are both very different from one another.

Rachel and Lucy Guerrero – They are sisters, around the same age as Esperanza and Nenny. They are originally from Texas, but now, they are living on Mango street. They buy an old bike, together, and share it, between them. They are described, in the novella, as having "fat popsicle lips" like the rest of their family. They all share a moment, in the book, where they are trying out high heels together. It isn’t until a man tries to convince Rachel to give him a kiss that they give up "being beautiful."

Sally – She is one of Esperanza's closest friends, and she is mentioned in several of the vignettes, in the novel. There is one full vignette dedicated to this character. The author describes her as "the girl with eyes like Egypt and nylons the color of smoke." This is the first phrase in the chapter, and it seems to embody the type of dreams Sally holds for herself. The protagonist is attracted to Sally's way of being and considers her to be a true friend. She likes being around her.

Sally seems to represent the vicious cycle of domestic violence and repression felt by women on Mango Street. She is utterly desperate to find a man to marry her, to escape the beatings and maltreatment she gets from her father at home. Her mother cares for her cuts and bruises, allowing for the violence to perpetuate, and both mother and daughter give excuses to the father. The bare fact that Sally marries at such a young age to a man that ends up treating her just like her father, shows how this cycle is so ingrained in the way of life of many women, and passed l, from generation to generation. The author pities this character, not blaming her for what happened to her, as Sally was very young and too immature to fully understand her surroundings or to find a way out.

Marin – She is a cousin of the Louie's family, neighbors of Esperanza's family, and she has come, from Puerto Rico, to stay. She is older than Esperanza, and she wears dark nylons and a lot of makeup. She has a boyfriend, back in Puerto Rico, and she shows off her mementos from him to the younger girls, sharing that he promised they would get married, soon. Esperanza looks up to her, as a figure of wisdom and of knowing many things. Marin imparted a lot of advice to the younger girls. She wore shorter skirts, she had pretty eyes, and she received a lot of attention, yet the protagonist will always remember her as someone who was always waiting for something to change, something that never came. This character represents many of the young women in the neighborhood.

Esperanza's mother – One of the first descriptions of Esperanza’s mother is that she has tresses like little rosettes, like little candy circles, all curly from the pins she uses for her hair. Her mother's smell made her feel safe, and in many ways, her mother is her pillar, wanting the best for Esperanza. The vignette "A Smart Cookie" is dedicated to her mother. Her mother can speak two languages, can sing opera, reads, and writes. She is handy around the house and she could have been anything she wanted, yet, she regrets not having gone anywhere and dropped out of school. Her mother expressed disgust that she dropped out of school for not having nice clothes. Several times, throughout the book, she encourages Esperanza to keep studying. Esperanza's mother is described as obedient, with an undemanding nature.

Alicia – Alicia is a young woman who lives in Esperanza's neighbourhood. She attends university and has a father who is thought to molest her and leave her to do all the chores. Alicia is also faced with many challenges, as women attending college at that time, especially lower-income Latina girls, was very uncommon, and the community judged her for that. Nonetheless, Alicia is thought to be a role model for Esperanza. Alicia's attendance at university allows her to escape their community and see the outside world. Returning to the neighbourhood from school, Alicia seems to have developed a disrespect for the cultural community of Mango Street and Esperanza notices that she is "stuck-up". Throughout the novel, Esperanza wishes to learn from Alicia. Ultimately, Alicia wants to be a true American and for the community to solely be part of her past.

Alicia is an inspiration to Esperanza and listens to Esperanza's sadness, when she has no one else to talk to. Esperanza learns a lot from Alicia and her lifestyle, realizing that Alicia does not "want to spend her whole life in a factory or behind a rolling pin" and instead pursues university and studies hard. Alicia plays a big role in understanding Esperanza's identity and its relationship to Mango Street. She confirms the intimacy between the two, by stating "Like it or not, you [Esperanza] are Mango Street."

Aunt Lupe – Aunt Lupe is primarily present in the vignette "Born Bad," in which Esperanza scolds herself for mimicking her dying aunt. Aunt Lupe is thought to "represent the passivity that women are so revered for in Mexican culture, that passivity which makes women accepting of whatever it is their patriarchal society chooses for them." Aunt Lupe married, had kids, and was a dutiful house wife. However, she suffered crippling illness that left her bedridden. Esperanza describes how her aunt went blind and her "bones gone limp as worms". She is thought to be representative of la Virgen de Guadalupe, as her proper name is Guadalupe. Aunt Lupe also encourages Esperanza to pursue writing, as she tells Esperanza that "writing would keep her free." Aunt Lupe eventually dies from her illness.

== Themes ==
=== Gender ===
Critics have noted that Esperanza's desire to break free from her neighborhood is not limited to a desire to escape poverty but also to escape strict gender roles she finds oppressive, within her culture. Esperanza's discovery of her own feminist values, which contradict the domestic roles prescribed for Chicana women, are a crucial part of her character development, throughout the novel. In keeping with this idea, Cisneros dedicates the novel "a las mujeres," or, "to the women."

Esperanza struggles against the traditional gender roles, within her own culture, and the limitations that her culture imposes upon women. Scholar Jean Wyatt writes, quoting Gloria Anzaldúa, that "Mexican social myths of gender crystallize, with special force, in three icons: 'Guadalupe, the loving mother who has not abandoned us, la Chingada (Malinche), the raped mother whom we have abandoned, and La Llorona, the mother who seeks her lost children.' According to the evidence of Chicana feminist writers, these 'three Our Mothers haunt the sexual and maternal identities of contemporary Mexican and Chicana women.'"

Every character, within the novel, is trapped by an abusive partner, teenage parenthood, or poverty. Esperanza finds a way out of patriarchal oppression. The lesson Cisneros wishes to express is that there is always a way out, for women who are trapped in one way or another. Critic María Elena de Valdés argues that gender plays a large part in the suppression of women, as it forces them to diminish themselves to the service of others, particularly in domestic life. Through her writing, de Valdés says, Esperanza creates herself as a subject of her own story and distances herself from these gendered expectations.

In an article focused on the role of high heels in the text, Lilijana Burcar argues that Cisneros offers a "critical dissection" of the role that such attributes of femininity play in constructing young women's self-image. It is argued that high heels do not only constrain women's role in society. Esperanza and her friends are given high heels to wear, as part of an unofficial rite of initiation into their community and society. We see this, in the vignette entitled "The Family of Little Feet," which tells of a mother who introduces her daughters to high heels, leaving the girls with an initial glee, as if they were Cinderella. Yet, this is also described as a horrifying experience for one of the girls, for she feels like she is no longer herself, that her foot is no longer her foot, as the shoe almost dissociates the woman from her body. And yet, as Burcar observes, "presented with a lesson on what it means to be a grown-up woman in American contemporary patriarchal society, the girls decide to cast away their high-heeled shoes."

Burcar expresses Esperanza Cordero's life as one of being the "antidote" to the predestined lives lived by the other female characters. The women in the novella have dreams, but due to their circumstances and the vicious cycle of domestication forces of a patriarchal society, they are confined to the same destiny of the women that came before them. A destiny that is centered in being a full-time wife and mother, working in the home. Esperanza, as a character, is formed outside of those gender norms, and she is presented as the only one that rebels. Choosing to set this, mainly, in the years of prepubescence is important, for those are the years where young women are taught to become socially acceptable, they are introduced to high heels, and specific forms of behaviors. Thus, at a very young age, they are molded into something that fits with the rules of the community where they are to become completely dependent on a man. This is the case for Esperanza's mother, who is uncommonly knowledgeable for the demographics of women on Mango Street, yet she doesn't know how to use the subway. Here, Burcar notes that "the traditional female bildungsroman has played a direct role in endorsing and upholding the cult of domesticity for women and the image of a woman as the angel in the house.” The author goes on to argue that capitalism plays a direct role in the perpetuation of the roles of women in society, as it is founded on the domestication of women, where men can work and fulfill the role of "breadwinner.."

There is economic dependency on women remaining in the home, and it is with these foundations that Esperanza begins with her "own quiet war. [. . .] [where she] leaves the table like a man, without putting back the chair or picking up the plate" versus being the servant, the woman, who puts back the chair and picks up the plate. Burcar argues that the novel ends on a note where it blames a patriarchal system for the entrapment of Mexican-American women in the home. For Esperanza, joining mainstream America (having a "house of [her] own") will allow her freedom as a woman. However, Burcar contends that this emancipation comes at the expense of the sacrifice of other women, women that came before her, particularly her mother.

=== Domestic and sexual abuse ===
Episodes of domestic and sexual violence are prevalent, in demonstrating women's issues in the Chicano community in The House on Mango Street. McCracken argues that "we see a woman whose husband locks her in the house, a daughter brutally beaten by her father, and Esperanza's own sexual initiation through rape." As McCracken notes, many of the men portrayed in the stories "control or appropriate female sexuality, by adopting one or another form of violence, as if it were their innate right." The many stories of Esperanza's friend, Sally, is an example of this patriarchal violence, as mentioned by McCracken. Sally is forced into a life of hiding in her house, and her father beats her. She, later on, escapes her father's violence, through marriage, where she is dependent and controlled by another man. As McCracken analyzes, "her father's attempts to control her sexuality cause Sally to exchange one repressive patriarchal prison for another." The House on Mango Street offers a glimpse of Esperanza's violent sexual initiation and also portrays the oppression and domestic abuse faced by other Chicana women. Together, with Esperanza's experience of sexual abuse, the "other instances of male violence in the collection-Rafaela's imprisonment, Sally's beatings, and the details of Minerva's life, which chronicles another young married woman whose husband beats her and throws a rock through the window, these episodes form a continuum in which sex, patriarchal power, and violence are linked."

=== Adolescence ===
The theme of adolescence is dominant, throughout the book. The actual timeline of the story is never specified, however, as it appears to chronicle a couple of crucial years of Esperanza Cordero's life in her Chicano neighbourhood. We see her transition from a naive child into a young adolescent woman who acquires a graphic understanding of the "sexual inequality, violence, and socioeconomic disparities." Esperanza is often torn between her identity as a child and her emergence into womanhood and sexuality, especially when she witnesses her friend, Sally, enter into the Monkey Garden to kiss boys. At this moment, she looked at her "feet in their white socks and ugly round shoes. They seemed far away. They didn't seem to be my feet anymore. And the garden that had been such a good place to play didn't seem mine, either."

With coming of age, the young women in the novel begin to explore their boundaries and indulge in risky behaviours. When Esperanza, Nenny, Lucy, and Rachel are given high-heeled shoes, they experiment with walking like a woman. They often observe older women, with a mix of wonder and fear for their futures. The attention men give them is unwanted by Esperanza, but her friends feel a bit more conflicted, because attention from the opposite sex is representative of their self-worth. Esperanza is different than her friends, because she wants to break free and live life by her own rules.

=== Identity ===
María Elena de Valdés argues that Esperanza's "search for self-esteem and her true identity is the subtle, yet powerful, narrative thread that unites the text." The aesthetic struggle that occurs in this piece takes place in Mango Street. This location, this world, becomes involved in the inner turmoil felt by the character. The main character uses this world, as a mirror to look deeply into herself as, in de Valdés's words, she "comes to embody the primal needs of all human beings: freedom and belonging." Here, the character is seen trying to unite herself with the notions she has of the world around her, which is Mango Street.

The relationship the protagonist has with the house, itself, is a pillar in this process of self-discovery, while the house is, in itself, a living being, as well, as mentioned by de Valdés. Her neighborhood engenders the battles of fear and hostility, of dualistic forces, of the notion of "I" versus "them.” The character is impressed upon by these forces, and they guide her growth as a person.

The house, itself, plays a very important part, especially in how the narrator reacts to it. She is fully aware that she does not belong there, everything about it is described in negative terms delineating everything that it isn't, versus what it is. It is by knowing where she does not fit that she knows to where she might fit. It is similar to the concept of light and dark. We know that darkness is the absence of light, in this case her identity exists outside of this house on mango street.

=== Belonging ===
Esperanza Cordero is an impoverished child and wishes to find a sense of belonging outside of her own neighbourhood, as she feels "this isn't my house I say and shake my head as if shaking could undo the year I've lived here. I don't belong. I don't ever want to come from here." Esperanza attempts to find such belonging, in the outside world, as she perceives this as a safe place that would accept her. She eminants this desire to belong through little things, such as favoring English over the Spanish typically used in her community or actively desiring the purchase of a house outside of Mango Street. In other words, Esperanza's sense of belonging is absolutely dependent on separating herself from her Spanish native tongue, community, and ultimately, away from Mango Street.

Marin is another character who is thought to lack belonging. Marin "is waiting for a car to stop, a star to fall, someone to change her life" and although she is supposed to leave Mango Street, the possibility is unlikely, as she lacks the money and independence to leave. Esperanza sees Marin as an individual who is only capable of longing but not able to really belong, as her dreams and desires are romanticized and unrealistic.

=== Language ===
Esperanza uses the occasional Spanish word, and as Regina Betz observes, "Spanglish frequents the pages where Esperanza quotes other characters" but "English is the primary language in Cisneros's novel." This is a sign, Betz continues, that her identity is "torn" between "her English tongue [. . .] and her Spanish roots." Betz argues that "Both author and character claim themselves as English, in order to flourish, as writers and independent women."

Furthermore, it is thought that the language barriers present in The House on Mango Street is a symbol of the boundary between one's self and the freedom and opportunities that are present in the rest of America. In addition, there is a certain value that is attributed to bilingualism in this book, while Spanish speakers are scoffed at and pitied.

== Chicano literature and culture ==
The House on Mango Street is an example of Chicano literature and explores the complexities of its culture. Through Esperanza Cordero, the heroine of this novel, Sandra Cisneros demonstrates that the "patriarchal Chicana Chicago community that raised her will not permit her development, as a female writer". Through this book, she addresses the oppression that many women feel, when growing up in Chicano communities, such as Mango Street.

== Adaptations ==
In 2017, composer Derek Bermel, with the permission of Sandra Cisneros, created Mango Suite, an orchestral suite with choreography and with monologues drawn from the novel. The piece was commissioned for the Chautauqua Institution by Francis and Cindy Letro, in honor of Tom and Jane Becker, and had its world premier on July 22, 2017. The performance combined the efforts of the Chautauqua Symphony Orchestra, Chautauqua Theater Company, the Charlotte Ballet and the Chautauqua Voice Program.

On January 22, 2020, Deadline Hollywood reported that The House on Mango Street would be adapted into a television series by Gaumont, which previously produced the largely Spanish language series Narcos.

Derek Bermel and Sandra Cisneros are also collaborating to develop an opera adaptation of The House on Mango Street. Cisneros is the librettist and the work will have its official premiere in July 2025 at the Glimmerglass Festival in upstate New York.

In 2026, Julianna Rubio Slager, artistic director of Ballet 5:8’s Second Company, choregraphed a new ballet based on the novel that follows Esperanza's coming of age through a series of vignettes. With support from NEA Big Read, Healing Illinois, and Arts Midwest as a part of America 250, Ballet 5:8 offered a series of events in conjunction with performances, including storytimes and movement-based workshops through community organizations and public libraries, and scheduled an appearance by Sandra Cisneros at the May 8th premiere.

== Critical reception ==
The House on Mango Street, Cisneros' second major publication, was released to critical acclaim, particularly earning praise from the Hispanic community for its realistic portrayals of the Hispanic experience in the United States. Bebe Moore Campbell of The New York Times Book Review wrote: "Cisneros draws on her rich [Latino] heritage . . . and seduces with precise, spare prose, creat[ing] unforgettable characters we want to lift off the page. She is not only a gifted writer, but an absolutely essential one." The book won Cisneros the American Book Award from the Before Columbus Foundation (1985) and is, now, required reading, in many school curriculums across the United States.

=== Challenges and attempted banning ===
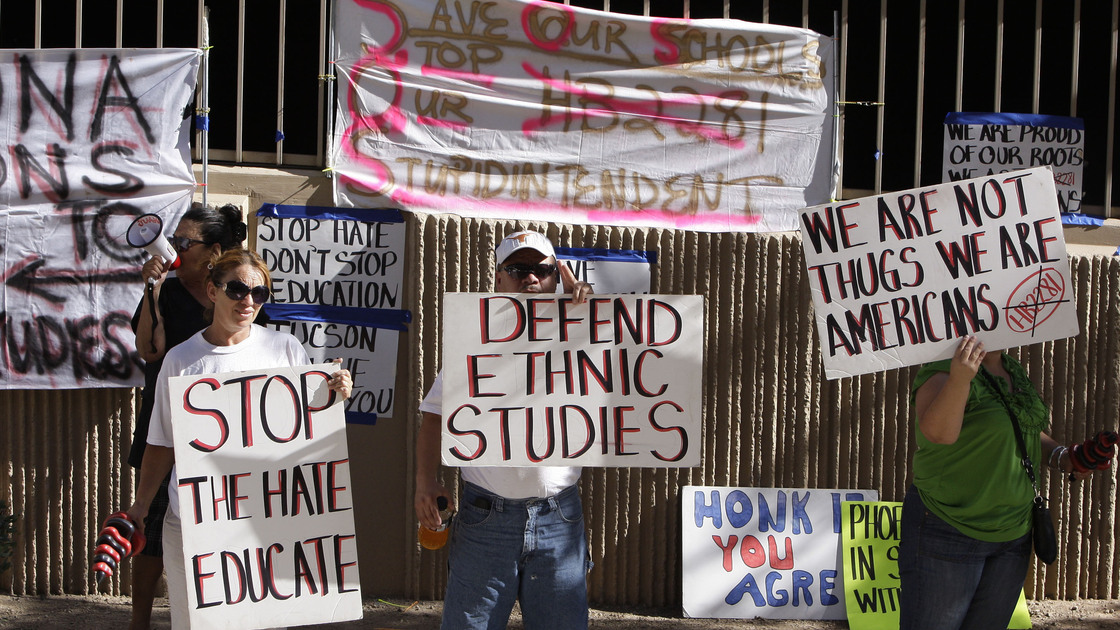
Protesters in June 2011 in support of the Tucson Unified School District's Mexican-American studies program. A new state law effectively ended the program, saying it was divisive.

Despite its high praise in the realm of Latino literature, The House on Mango Street has also received criticism for its sensitive subject matter and has been banned from several school curriculums. The American Library Association has listed the book as a "Frequently Challenged Book with Diverse Content". For example, in 2012 the St. Helens school board in Oregon removed the book from its middle-school curriculum, expressing "concerns for the social issues presented." In response, Katie Van Winkle, a former student at St. Helens, launched a letter-writing campaign on Facebook. Her efforts to "save Mango Street" were successful and the St. Helens school board voted to keep The House on Mango Street in its curriculum.

The House on Mango Street was also one of the 80-plus books that were part of the Tucson Unified School District's K-12 Mexican-American studies curriculum before the program was dismantled under Arizona House Bill 2281. This law "forbids classes to advocate the overthrow of the United States, promote racial resentment, or emphasize students' ethnicity rather than their individuality." When the Mexican-American Studies program was ended, all the books that were associated with it, including "The House on Mango Street", were removed from the school's curriculum.

In response, teachers, authors, and activists formed a caravan in the spring of 2012. The caravan, called the Librotraficante Project, originated at the Alamo and ended in Tucson. Its participants organized workshops and distributed books that had been removed from the curriculum. Cisneros, herself, traveled with the caravan, reading The House on Mango Street and running workshops about Chicano literature. She brought numerous copies of the book with her, distributed them, and discussed thematic implications of her novel, as well as talked about the book's autobiographical elements.

== Publication history ==
The House on Mango Street has sold well over 6 million copies and has been translated into over 20 languages. For its 25th anniversary in 2008, the book was reissued in a special anniversary edition.

- 1983, United States, Arte Público Press ISBN 978-0934770200, Pub date 1983, paperback
- 1984, United States, Arte Público Press ISBN 0-934770-20-4, Pub date 1 January 1984, paperback
- 1991, United States, Vintage Contemporaries ISBN 0-679-73477-5, Pub date 3 April 1991, paperback

An introduction was included in the novel in 2009. This can be found in the 25th anniversary edition of the book (ISBN 9780345807199).

== See also ==
- Chicana feminism
- Chicano literature
- Chicano Movement
- Chicago literature

== Sources ==
- Betz, Regina M (2012), "Chicana 'Belonging' in Sandra Cisneros' The House on Mango Street", Rocky Mountain Review, 66: 18–33
- Burcar, Lilijana (2017), "Ethnicizing women's Domestic Entrapment in Sandra Cisneros's Antibildungsroman The House on Mango Street", Fluminensia: Journal for Philological Research, 29 (2): 113–137, doi:10.31820/f.29.2.4
- Burcar, Lilijana (2019), "High Heels as a Disciplinary Practice of Femininity in Sandra Cisneros's The House on Mango Street", Journal of Gender Studies, 28 (3): 353–362, doi:10.1080/09589236.2018.1472556, hdl:20.500.12556/RUL-160777-7f1ff36e-78c6-50b2-6676-0e645b9bb6d5, S2CID 149716908.
- Cepeda, Christine (2006), The Construction of Chicana Identity in The House on Mango Street by Sandra Cisneros (PDF). MA Thesis, Rice University.
- Cisneros, Sandra (1984), The House on Mango Street, New York: Vintage, ISBN 9780679734772
- Cisneros, Sandra (2009), "A House of My Own", The House on Mango Street, New York: Vintage, pp. xi–xxvii, ISBN 9780679734772
- de Oliveira, Philip (2017-07-22), "Derek Bermel and Sandra Cisneros collaboration receives its premiere through ‘Mango Suite’" The Chatauquan Daily, retrieved November 12, 2024
- de Valdés, María Elena (1992), "In Search of Identity in Cisneros's The House on Mango Street.", Canadian Review of American Studies, 23 (1): 55–72, doi:10.3138/CRAS-023-01-04, S2CID 201723439.
- de Valdés, María Elena (2005), "The Critical Reception of Sandra Cisneros's The House on Mango Street", Contemporary Literary Criticism, vol. 193, Gale Literature Resource Center Originally published as de Valdés, María Elena (1993), "The Critical Reception of Sandra Cisneros's The House on Mango Street", in von Bardeleben, Renate (ed.), Gender, Self, and Society: Proceedings of the IV International Conference on the Hispanic Cultures of the United States, Peter Lang, pp. 287–295
- Dubb, Christina Rose (2007), "Adolescent Journeys: Finding Female Authority in The Rain Catchers and The House on Mango Street", Children's Literature in Education, 38 (3): 219–232, doi:10.1007/s10583-006-9032-2, S2CID 143603423
- Madsen, Deborah L. (2000), Understanding Contemporary Chicana Literature: Bernice Zamora, Ana Castillo, Sandra Cisneros, Denise Chávez, Alma Luz Villanueva, Lorna Dee Cervantes, Columbia, SC: University of South Carolina Press, ISBN 1-57003-379-X, OCLC 45066368.
- Matchie, Thomas (1995), "Literary Continuity in Sandra Cisneros's The House on Mango Street", The Midwest Quarterly, 37 (1): 67–79
- McCracken, Ellen (1989), "Sandra Cisneros' The House on Mango Street: Community-Oriented Introspection and the Demystification of Patriarchal Violence" (PDF), in Horno-Delgado, Asunción; Ortega, Eliana; Scott, Nina; Saporta Sternbach, Nancy (eds.), Breaking Boundaries: Latina Writings and Critical Readings, Amherst: University of Massachusetts Press, pp. 62–71
- Montagne, Renee (April 9, 2009), "House on Mango Street Celebrates 25 Years", National Public Radio.
- Sloboda, Nicholas (1997), "A Home in the Heart: Sandra Cisneros's The House on Mango Street", Aztlán, 22 (2): 89–106, doi:10.1525/azt.1997.22.2.89
- Tokarczyk, Michelle (2008), ""Spiritual Sustenance: An Interview with Sandra Cisneros"", Class Definitions: On the Lives and Writings of Maxine Hong Kingston, Sandra Cisneros, and Dorothy Allison, Selinsgrove: Susquehanna University Press, pp. 212–219, ISBN 9781575911212.
- Wissman, Kelly (June 20, 2006), ""Writing Will Keep You Free": Allusions to and Recreations of the Fairy Tale Heroine in The House on Mango Street", Children's Literature in Education, 38 (1): 17–34, doi:10.1007/s10583-006-9018-0, S2CID 144628262.
- Wyatt, Jean (1995), "On Not Being La Malinche: Border Negotiations of Gender in Sandra Cisneros's "Never Marry a Mexican" and "Woman Hollering Creek"", Tulsa Studies in Women's Literature, 14 (2): 243–271, doi:10.2307/463899, JSTOR 463899.
