= Exilee and Temps Morts =

2022 posthumous collection by Theresa Hak Kyung Cha

Exilee and Temps Morts: Selected Works
- Author: Theresa Hak Kyung Cha
- Publisher: University of California Press
- Publication date: September 6, 2022
- Pages: 290
- ISBN: 978-0-520-39159-8

Exilée and Temps Morts: Selected Works is a posthumous 2022 collection of selected and unpublished works by Theresa Hak Kyung Cha, published by University of California Press and the Berkeley Art Museum and Pacific Film Archive (BAMPFA). It spans Cha's textual and visual pieces between 1976 and 1982.

== Background ==
The book gathers Cha's work and was edited by Constance Lewallen. Lewallen also wrote an introduction to the book, and a piece by Ed Park is included.

The title refers to two of Cha's works, Exilée and Temps Morts, both of which appeared in the anthology HOTEL published in 1980 by Tanam Press.

Following the book's publication, BAMPFA screened Cha's film installation Exilée.

== Critical reception ==
Bookforum stated that "Cha's adventurous spirit is present in even the least of these works, a breath of a bygone avant-garde that still hits its mark with astonishing frequency."

Poetry concluded that "This collection of Cha's early reckoning—through art and poetry—with life in the United States, as part of the Korean diaspora, offers inspiring and, at times, haunting, glimpses into Cha’s creative origins and processes."
