= Theresa Hak Kyung Cha =

American author and artist (1951–1982)

- 차학경
- Cha c. 1980, in Seoul
- Born: March 4, 1951; Busan, South Korea
- Died: November 5, 1982 (aged 31); New York City, United States
- Resting place: Ashes placed at an unknown location
- Education: University of San Francisco; University of California, Berkeley (BA, MA, MFA)
- Occupations: Novelist; producer; director; artist
- Spouse: Richard Barnes (m.1982-1982; her death)
- Writing career
- Language: English
- Years active: 1974 to 1982
- Notable work: Dictee (1982)

- Theresa Hak Kyung Cha
- Hangul: 차학경
- Hanja: 車學慶
- RR: Cha Hakgyeong
- MR: Ch'a Hakkyŏng

Theresa Hak Kyung Cha (Korean: 차학경; March 4, 1951 – November 5, 1982) was an American novelist, producer, director, and artist of South Korean origin, best known for her 1982 novel, Dictée. Considered an avant-garde artist, Cha was fluent in Korean, English, and French. The main body of Cha's work is "looking for the roots of language before it is born on the tip of the tongue." Cha's practice experiments with language through repetition, manipulation, reduction, and isolation, exploring the ways in which language marks one's identity, in unstable and multiple expressions. Cha's interdisciplinary background was clearly evident in Dictée, which experiments with juxtaposition and hypertext of both print and visual media. Cha's Dictée is frequently taught in contemporary literature classes including women's literature.

== Early life ==
Cha was born in Busan, South Korea during the Korean War. She was the middle child of five, with two older and two younger siblings, to Hyung Sang Cha (father) and Hyung Soon Cha (mother), who were both raised in Manchuria during Japan’s occupation of Korea and China, and forced to learn and work in Japanese.

Cha and her family emigrated to the United States in 1962 when Cha was twelve years old, first settling in Hawaii and then relocating in 1964 to the San Francisco Bay Area, where she attended Convent of the Sacred Heart High School. During her time there, Cha studied French language, and French, Greek, and Roman classics. She also sang in the choir at Sacred Heart. By the time she graduated Cha had earned many scholastic awards, including a poetry contest prize at the age of fourteen, two years after she started learning English.

== Education ==
Before committing to University of California Berkeley, Cha briefly attended the University of San Francisco for a semester. She transferred to UC Berkeley the following year, where she completed her studies in art and writing. As an art student, she initially concentrated on ceramic sculpture. However, she was soon introduced to the then new medium of performance, and subsequently embarked on a series of performances as protagonist, all accompanied by her live or recorded spoken words. One of her classmates at Berkeley was artist Yong Soon Min.

As a student, she became close friends with Dennis Love, another student, and Bertrand Augst, a professor of French and comparative literature. Her classes with Augst inspired Cha to study comparative literature, in which she later earned degrees. Teachers and friends have stated that Cha enjoyed reading broadly, anything from Korean poetry to European modernist and postmodern literature. She received her Bachelor's degree in comparative literature in 1973 and a second Bachelor's degree in art in 1975, both from Berkeley.

During this time, the Free Speech Movement and anti-war movement of the 1970s resulted in an air of political and social upheaval for Berkeley students demanding socio-political change. The unrest fed into the experimentation of conceptual art movements of the Bay Area. Performance art became particularly strong in the Bay Area during Cha's schooling in the 1970s, as one of many new genres being explored by artists seeking to escape the restraints of traditional art forms, with a revolutionary spirit related to the radical political and cultural shifts taking place. Though Cha was not an active participant in protest activities, she drew on the experimental qualities they represented, without her work itself being overtly socio-political. Cha worked as a student employee of the Pacific Film Archive for three years between 1974 and 1977 while earning two graduate degrees in art (MA, 1977; MFA, 1978).

Cha's MFA thesis Paths (1978) highlighted the critical role of the viewer as the receptor and activator of her work. In it, she notes: "The viewer holds the position as the complement, an avenue, through multiple interpretations, give [sic] multiple dimensions to the work. If the work has the strength (this is very subjective) the renewal and regenerating processes could be illimitable." Thus for Cha, the "viewer" of the work is not merely a passive subject; they are the "complement" or "avenue" that keeps the work alive with perpetual regeneration.

As a graduate student, she became close friends with faculty member Jim Melchert, and even became his teaching assistant in 1976. As Cha's interest in film grew, she studied at Berkeley under Bertrand Augst, who recalls her interest in poetry written by Stéphane Mallarmé and plays by Samuel Beckett. According to Augst, Cha felt an affinity with Mallarmé's associative and restrained use of language. Beckett's highly reductive style of theater found echoes in the spare setting of Cha's performances. More than the stylistic influence of Beckett or Mallarmé, Cha's studies of film theory with Augst had perhaps the greatest effect on her development. From these studies, Cha hoped to integrate film theory into her art practice. In an application for an extension of her grant to study in Paris, Cha wrote: "It is essential for me to see the possibilities of Film-making as an expression closely tied with other expressions supported by its theory as Reference to see the application of theory to actual works followed by a re-recognition, 'realization' of the theory in practice."

In 1976, Cha decided to pursue a degree in film theory at the UC Education Abroad Program, Centre d'Etudes Americain du Cinema, in Paris. During her stay she studied under Jean-Louis Baudry, Raymond Bellour, Monique Wittig, and Christian Metz. Her encounter with their theories culminated in her editing an anthology of writings entitled Apparatus/Cinematographic Apparatus: Selected Writings (Tanam Press, 1980), which includes articles by Roland Barthes, Jean-Louis Baudry, Theirry Kuntzel, Christian Metz, Bertrand Augst, and others as well as a piece by Cha herself, a major work based on word deconstruction titled Commentaire. In the filmic, multipage text, Cha deconstructs the French word commentaire into French and English components and homonyms (comment, taire, commentary, tear, etc.). In her preface for the book, Cha states: "The intention is to identify the individual components and complete film apparatus, the interdependent operations comprising the film, the author of the film, the spectator... The essential element of the project is to reveal the process of film and make accessible the theoretical writings and materials of filmmakers."

While studying in Paris, Cha spent a short time in Amsterdam and met a group of artists, most of whom were from Iceland. One of whom was Ulises Carrion, a poet, author of artists' books, video and filmmaker who founded Other Books and So in Amsterdam, where Cha exhibited her artist book, presence/absence (1975) in 1977.

== Career and personal life ==
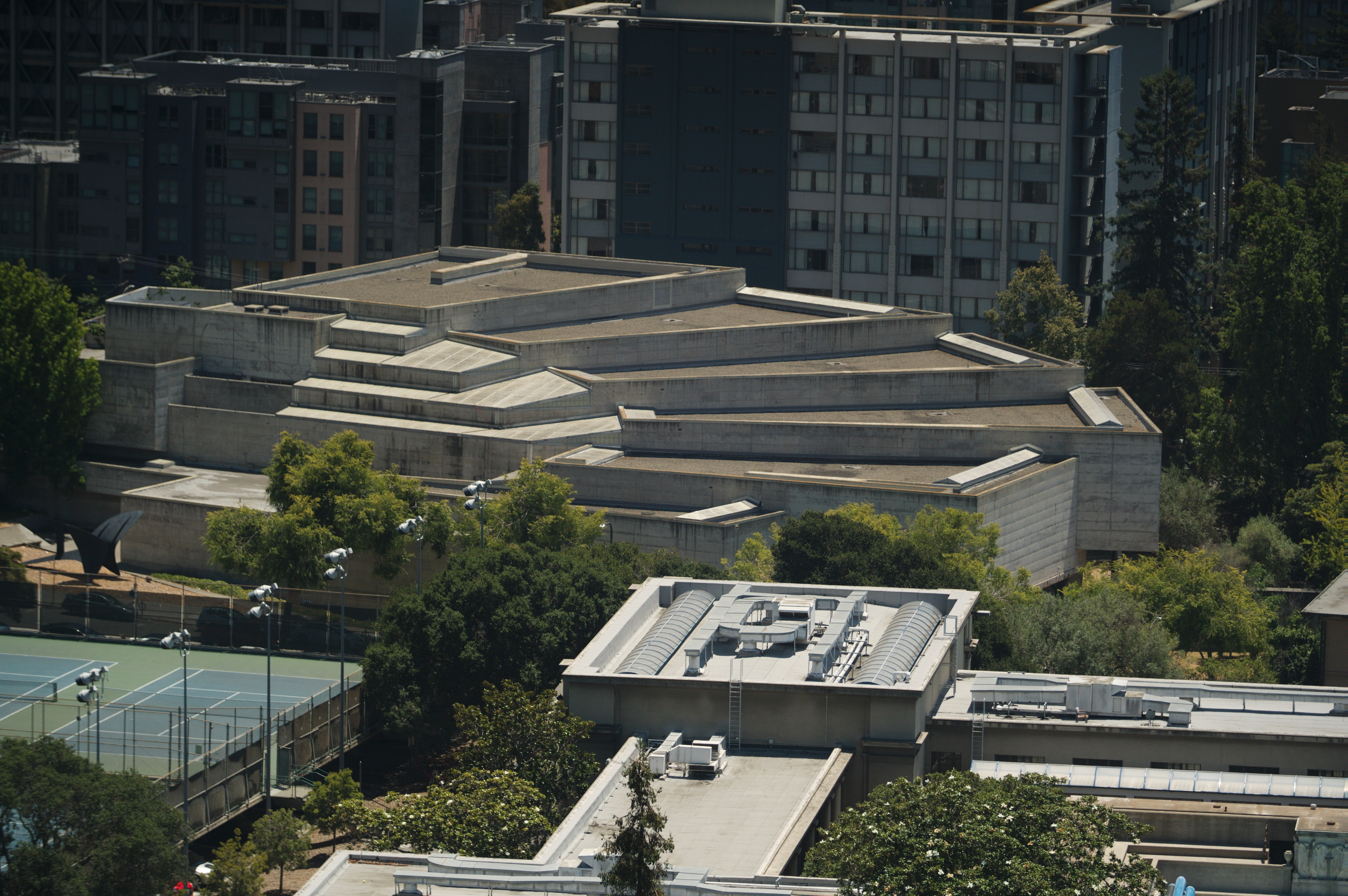
Mario Ciampi designed the building (completed in 1970) that was the former home of the University of California, Berkeley Art Museum and Pacific Film Archive (BAMPFA) on Bancroft Way in Berkeley, California, where Cha worked while attending graduate school. Cha's estate donated her works to BAMPFA in 1991.

Cha began her career as a performance artist, producer, director, and writer in 1974. She also worked as an usher and cashier from 1974 to 1977 at the Pacific Film Archive, with friends. She was known to study and practice mainly in the Bay Area as well as Paris and New York.

In 1979, Cha traveled back to South Korea for the first time in seventeen years. She had long expressed great anticipation to return in her book Exilée, where she describes the flight in terms of the sixteen time zones that separate San Francisco from Seoul. As a major event in her life and work, her family's exile from Korea in 1963 was a subject she treated often symbolically, representing displacement through shifts and ruptures in the visual and linguistic forms of her work. In a broad group of works, Cha engages a variety of theoretical models to articulate the experience of displacement. That year in 1979, Cha also performed her work Other Things Seen, Other Things Heard at the San Francisco Museum of Modern Art, attracting the attention of Robert Atkins, art critic for the San Francisco Bay Guardian.

In August 1980, Cha moved to New York City, working as an editor and writer for Tanam Press. Earlier that year, she also traveled to Japan and then back to South Korea, this time working on the film White Dust From Mongolia from May to July 1980 with her brother. They were never able to finish the film due to the dangerous political situation in South Korea at the time. South Korea's President Park Chung Hee had just been assassinated the previous year and restrictive new laws had been declared. The Chas were harassed by South Korean officials who thought they might be North Korean spies.

In 1981, Cha began teaching video art at Elizabeth Seton College while working in the design department of the Metropolitan Museum of Art. She was awarded an artist's residence at the Nova Scotia College of Art and Design in 1982. She married photographer Richard Barnes in May 1982; the two had met in a drawing class in 1975, during her time at UC Berkeley.

== Style ==
=== Themes ===
From 1910 to 1945, the Korean language was forbidden to be communicated in Korea under Japanese rule. Cha linked her own process of learning language – whether that be in her Korean first language, English, French or Latin – to the extraordinary cultural oppression experienced in Korea during this nearly 40-year period. She is known to have written mainly on a manual typewriter or by hand, often deliberately misspelling words or otherwise altering generally accepted word usage to create double meanings or other affects ("some time" rather than sometime" for example).

In the body of Cha's art, language functions as fluid binary systems of contemporaneous displacement and reunification, repression and freedom, detachment and engagement, and the ineffable and communication. Much of Cha's work demonstrates an interaction and interplay between languages with her primary focus on "grammatical structures of a language, syntax, how words and meaning are constructed in the language system itself, by function or usage, and how transformation is brought about through manipulation, processes as changing the syntax, isolation, removing from context, repetition, and reduction to minimal units." Since language unified Cha's aesthetic approach, establishing an intimate dialogue with the audience was a deliberate consideration in her art. The audience held a "privileged place in that She/He is the receptor and or activator central to an exchange or dialogue." For Cha, the audience is the "Other" whose presence establishes, or completes, any form of communication. As she writes in her 1977 mail-art piece "audience distant relative":

you are the audience
you are my distant audience
i address you
as i would a distant relative
as if a distant relative
seen only heard only through someone else's description.

neither you nor i
are visible to each other
i can only assume that you can hear me
i can only hope that you hear me

As is evident in the title of the work, the "audience" to which Cha refers functions like a distant relative who can be "seen only heard only through someone else's description." The materiality of the medium, mail, "performs a contingent reticulation of the artist, the artwork, and its recipient, which remain disjointed across an incalculable distance." Not only do the properties of mail signify the spatial distance between Cha and the audience, they also mark the temporal distance. Audience distant relative therefore reflects Cha's exploration of the possibilities and limits of communication between sender and receiver as well as subject and object.

Cha's major written work Dictée (1982) heavily features French and English, along with other languages, often together on the same page. Commonly, the languages are used in repetitive, "broken" phrases and frequent code-switching, similar to the communication of an individual learning the languages. According to Hyun Yi Kang, this style causes readers to "[reconsider] the arbitrary and ideologically colored prescriptions on language and writing, challenging the requirements of good speech and correct grammar." In Dictée, Cha turns to the structures of Korean religious and social codes as a possible means for centering her displaced identity. Confucianism, for example, one of the major Korean philosophical institutions, serves as the model for Cha's recurring invocation of filial connection. In Confucianism, the most sacred tie is not fealty to a supernatural entity or entities, but the bonds that exist among blood relatives. As such, in the opening section of Dictée, Cha writes:

From A Far
What nationality
or what kindred and relation
what blood relation
what blood ties of blood
what ancestry
what race generation
what house clan tribe stock strain
what lineage extraction
what breed sect gender denomination caste
what stray ejection misplaced
Tertium Quid neither one thing nor the other
Tombe des nues de naturalized
what transplant to dispel upon

Dictée can be understood as Cha's attempt to recall her lost genealogy and to articulate it in words and images. Yet, speech itself appears to have been fractured through the trauma of exile.

Cha's contributions to art magazines, such as High Performance in 1978 and Heresies: A Feminist Publication on Art and Literature in 1982 reflect her active engagement with interdisciplinary and experimental art practices associated with San Francisco and New York City art scenes. Around the same time, in New York City, Tanam Press, founded by Reese Williams, produced several artist's books, such as Hotel (1980), which includes works by Cha, Laurie Anderson, Jenny Holzer and Peter Nadin, Michael Meyers, Richard Nonas, Reese Williams, and Mike Roddy. Cha's artist's book and mail art pieces were featured in shows that focused on this medium, including Boksaning--Bookshop at Nylistasfnio at the Living Art Museum in Reykjavik, Iceland in 1980, and Words and Arts at Reese Bullen Gallery, Humboldt State University in Arcata, California in 1980. After the 1981 Kunstenaarsboeken/Artists' Books From the Other Books and So Archive exhibition at Stedelijk Museum in Amsterdam, Netherlands, which traveled to Living Museum, Reykjavik, Iceland, Cha's work on mail art had rarely been highlighted. The interest in the artist's book as a medium seemed to vanish soon after the 1980s.

In the visual arts, Cha’s work echoes both the conceptual art movement on the West Coast and the Fluxus movement. In the same way that her writing defies generic fixation and speaks in illuminating ways about identity and subjectivity, her artworks represent an eclectic combination of international artistic developments and localized experiences of identity. One of the early contemporary artists of the Korean diaspora in the United States, Cha’s work has already begun to think about how the mainstream avant-garde tradition is reinvented by artists and its periphery. Like Terry Fox and Conceptual artists around her time, she was interested in the use of body and language in art. Her video art, Mouth to Mouth (1975), depicting the artist’s mouth silently voicing the eight vowels in the Korean language, is structurally similar to Fox’s Tonguings (1970) and Bruce Nauman’s Lip Sync (1967). However, with the addition of Cha’s distinct approach to language and semiotics, Mouth to Mouth uses the techniques of body-based video art to convey her own foreign and diasporic identity, illuminating the uneven functioning of language throughout colonial history.

Throughout her video art, Cha was primarily interested in the material experience of language in terms of its textual, aural, and audial quality instead of just the epistemology of language explored by East Coast Conceptual artists like Joseph Kosuth. In her video art Vidéoème (1976), she uses word plays to invoke the multifaceted perception of language across the senses, but this experience of language is also centered around a loss and invisibility evident in the title’s wordplay: "vidé" means emptied in French, while "video" is both the genre of the work and the word for “to see” in Latin. She was also interested in consciously manipulating videotapes to convey nuanced meanings. For example, in Mouth to Mouth, the pixelation of the image and the dubbing of the sound of the original videotape accentuate a sense of inscrutability rather than visibility achieved through video technology.

== Influences ==
Cha was influenced by a variety of sources. Her friends say that she was inspired by the art activity around her, but there has been little analysis of this aspect of her development as an artist. Cha was inspired by artist Terry Fox, a fellow artist and performer. She met him in 1973, during one of his solo exhibitions at the UAM, now Art, Design & Architecture Museum at UCSB. Cha came to his performances and watched Fox and his brother Larry interact with various materials and objects, such as metal and a mirror.

Fox's exhibit involved a variety of media and formats, including performance, sculpture, and drawing. Cha drew her inspiration from Fox's slow, ritualistic performances. The translucent veil employed by Fox to demarcate and isolate his performance space was a device Cha used in her performances A Ble Wail (1975) and Pause Still (1979; performed with her sister Bernadette). Cha also used props—candles, bamboo sticks, flour—in some of her performance, which Fox had previously used in his own. Cha and Fox have been compared in similar slow, deliberate, almost trance-like paces they employed in their performance work. Fox had witnessed a few of Cha's performances and commented on the way she moved in the space, barefoot, not making a sound.

During her time as an usher, Cha became interested in the work of Marguerite Duras, Jean-Luc Godard, Alain Resnais, Yasujirō Ozu, and many other film theorists and artists. Carl Dreyer was a particularly recurrent influence, particularly his film The Passion of Joan of Arc (1928), which was quoted in Cha's super-8 and video installation Exilée (1980) among other instances in her work.

In the visual arts, her work has been included in the expanded account of conceptual art initiated by the exhibition Global Conceptualism: Points of Origin, 1950s–1980s, in addition her work usually features in the San Francisco Bay-area accounts of conceptual art, the dates of which are later than the East Coast accounts.

== Performance ==
Cha's performance work primarily concerned the involvement of the spectator, viewer, and audience. Early performance works "sought to involve the spectator as thoroughly as possible." Cha's performance piece, Reveille Dans la Brume, which was shown at La Mamelle Arts Center in 1977 and the Fort Mason Art Center in San Francisco in 1979, "places the spectator in a viewing situation equivalent to the cinema, where 'the spectator identifies with her/himself, with herself as a pure act of perception: as a condition of the perceived and hence as a kind of transcendental subject anterior to every there is.'" The work consisted of lap-dissolve projections of slides, her live voices, pre-recorded voiceovers, and preconfigured light control. Cha's other performance work, A Ble Wail (1975) deploys the "flicker of the mirrored candle reflections," which incorporates the filmic experience into the performance format to induce what Constance M. Lewallen describes as a "state of heightened receptivity." Audiences were distanced from Cha, who was wearing a white robe that was reminiscent of traditional Korean costume, Hanbok, across an opaque, transparent curtain. In her performance description, Cha wrote "in this piece, I want to be the dream of the audience."

== Additional works ==
Cha's three-channel video installation, Passages Paysages (1978) is composed of dissolved and faded words, still images, and narration in Korean and English. The central image of the piece is composed of Cha's childhood photos, the artist's hand, stacks of letters, landscapes, rooms, and an unmade bed. The use of multiple screens and asynchronous narrations in three languages and their seemingly unrelatedness to the images points to how meaning and narratives are produced, altered, and diversified. The work's fading and dissolving of words and still images reflect the transitions of time and memory.

The major text Temps Morts was written by Cha in 1980 and begins, "it dawns on me just the other day that / i have been back back for months." The title, translating in English to "dead time," is a double entendre. Cha began learning French in high school, and her involvement with both French language and French culture was intensified by her exposure to Nouvelle Vague cinema while studying at UC Berkeley and working at Pacific Film Archive. It also contains several references to Japan, which suggests that she wrote it after a second trip, to Japan and Korea in 1980, for the purpose of making the film White Dust from Mongolia, her final, unfinished project.

White Dust From Mongolia (1980) was an unpublished film shot in Korea with which Cha planned to write a historical novel with the same title. In late 1980, Cha and her younger brother, James, traveled to Seoul, South Korea, with the intention of shooting the film. Cha had received a grant of $3,000 from the National Endowment for the Arts and a $15,000 Chancellor's Postdoctoral Fellowship from the University of California specifically for the film. They arrived in Korea during a period of political crisis, however martial law was in effect following the assassination of President Park Chung Hee in the previous year. As Cha and James attempted to film in the streets of Seoul, they were harassed by police for suspicion of being North Korean spies and were finally forced to abandon the project. Short segments of film that James did manage to film and Cha's written description of the project remain. Against the backdrop of the historical period of the Japanese occupation of Korea from 1909 to 1945, the unrealized film and book would explore the process of memory at its core, "its philosophical and physiological effect. In her plan for the film project, Cha highlights the universal question of memory, calling to mind Duchamp's notion that calls "what we see is only a souvenir, vague, imprecise, unfaithful of what it really is." Yet in her plan for the novel, Cha emphasizes the historical narrative more and addresses the relationship between identity, language, and exile in the larger context of memory. In a project outline sketched out by Cha, she highlights the effects of time on memory, a recurring theme across her work, by having two points in time—past and present—happen simultaneously in the narrative.

== Exhibitions ==
In the early 1980s, Cha's video and multimedia installation works were included in several shows focused on new media. Cha's multimedia installation, Exilée (1980) was presented for the first time in 1980, with an accompanying text of the same name written in anticipation of Cha's 1979 trip to Korea, her first visit since she had left the country of her birth at age eleven. Translating to "exiled" from French, the work refers to Cha's feelings of separation from her birth country. In 1981, Exilée was shown at the San Francisco Museum of Modern Art as part of a performance evening sponsored by the women's Caucus for Arts as well as at the Queens Museum in New York. Around the same time, Cha's work was included in shows gesturing toward the feminist art movement: Women's Work at The Kitchen (1982); Difference: On Representation and Sexuality at the New Museum of Contemporary Art (1985); Autobiography in Her Own Image at INTAR Latin American Gallery (1988).

Cha's first professional exhibition was part of a group show in 1980 at the San Francisco Art Institute Annual. A posthumous showing of Cha's work was organized by her friend Judith Barry and exhibited at Artists Space a month after her death. In 1992, Exilée was shown at the Korean American Arts Festival in the San Francisco Bay Area. In 1993, the exhibition Across the Pacific: Contemporary Korean and Korean American Art, was organized by SEORO Korean Cultural Network, the first Korean American artists' network in New York at the Queens Museum. Then 1992 exhibition Mis/Taken Identities, organized by Abigail Solomon Godeau, at the University Art Museum, University of California, Santa Barbara, included Cha's Exilée (1980) and Mouth to Mouth (1975), along with works by Adrian Piper, Carrie Mae Weems, Marlon Riggs, Lorna Simpson, Yong Soon Min, Jimmie Durham, and others. In 1990, the University Art Museum in Berkeley (now the Berkeley Art Museum and Pacific Film Archive), organized Cha's solo presentation as part of their MATRIX Program for Contemporary Art, curated by Lawrence Rinder, the third curator of the MATRIX program. Cha then had two solo exhibitions in 1993 and 1995 curated by John Hanhardt at the Whitney Museum of American Art in New York as part of its New American Film and Video Series. In 1993, Hanhardt invited Lawrence Rinder to curate Cha's solo exhibition, Theresa Hak Kyung Cha: Other Things Seen, Other Things Heard at the Whitney Museum. In conjunction with the exhibition, a panel discussion was given by Judith Barry, bell hooks, and Yong Soon Min. The 1995 solo exhibition of Cha at the Whitney Museum was titled Theresa Hak Kyung Cha: Exilée and featured prominently the work.

An exhibition of Cha's work entitled The Dream of the Audience: Theresa Hak Kyung Cha (1951-1982) was organized and shown in 2001 at the University of California Berkeley Art Museum by senior curator Constance Lewallen. This exhibition, building off the work of two previously organized by former curator Lawrence Rinder, aimed to display lesser known work by Cha including other published works, videos, performances, works on paper, and mail art. The exhibit later went on tour, including stops in Irvine (Beall Center for Art and Technology), New York City (Bronx Museum of the Arts), Illinois (Krannert Art Museum), and Seattle (Henry Art Gallery), with a final stop in Seoul. The exhibition continued to Vienna (Generali Foundation) and Barcelona (Fundació Antoni Tàpies). Its catalogue featured essays by Constance Lewallen, Lawrence Rinder, and Trin T. Minh-ha, all providing accounts of the artist's influences, biographical information, the 1970s Bay Area conceptual art scene as well as theoretical analyses focused on language, cognitive analytic theory, and film theories popularize among the 1970s French avant-garde. The 2007 exhibition Wack! Art and the Feminist Revolution, curated by Cornelia Butler at the Museum of Contemporary Art in Los Angeles, featured Cha's Passages Paysages and stills from her 1974 video work Secret Spill.

Cha's work was exhibited again in Paris (group exhibition Fais un effort pour te souvenir. Ou, à défaut, invente., at the Bétonsalon) and London (A Portrait in Fragments, sponsored and hosted by The Korean Cultural Centre UK; and with a showing of her films at the Institute of Contemporary Arts) in 2013. In 2018, BAMPFA staged an exhibition based on Cha's book Dictée entitled Theresa Hak Kyung Cha: Avant Dictee, organized by assistant curator Stephanie Cannizzo. The Cleveland Museum of Art also staged Cha's video work in a show entitled Theresa Hak Kyung Cha: Displacements in 2018. In spring 2022, the Hessel Museum of Art held a solo presentation of a range of Cha’s works in various mediums in an exhibition titled Theresa Hak Kyung Cha: audience distant relative curated by Min Sun Jeon. Simultaneously, an assortment of Cha's videos and works on paper were selected as a part of the 2022 Whitney Biennial biennial, Quiet As It's Kept.

== Death ==
A week after her novel Dictée was published, on November 5, 1982, Cha was raped and murdered by Joey Sanza, a security guard at the Puck Building on Lafayette Street in Lower Manhattan. She had gone there to meet her husband Richard Barnes, who was documenting the renovation of the building and had an office there. Sanza raped, strangled, and then bludgeoned her to death, removing a ring from her finger.

Sanza, who had since been imprisoned in Florida for 12 counts of sexual battery committed between January and June 1982, was indicted for the rape and murder of Cha in 1983, and, after three separate trials, eventually convicted on those charges in 1987, and sentenced to life imprisonment.

Shortly before her death, Cha had been working on an artistic piece for a group show at Artists Space in SoHo. The Artists Space exhibit ultimately became a memorial for her, showcasing images and text from Dictée. Additional work left incomplete at the time of her death included another film, a book, a critique of advertising, and a piece on the representation of hands in Western painting.

The New York Times published an obituary of Cha as part of its Overlooked series in 2022.

== Legacy ==
In 1991, nine years following Cha's murder, her brother and director of the Theresa Hak Kyung Cha Memorial Foundation, John Cha, asked if the University of California Berkeley Art Museum would be able to set up safe-keeping of Cha's videos, artwork, and archives. The gift was accepted by the Berkeley Art Museum and Pacific Film Archive (BAMPFA) in 1992. Some of Cha's work is available through the Electronic Arts Intermix (EAI).

In 1994, a collection of critical essays on Dictée edited by Elaine Kim and Norma Alarcón, Writing Self, Writing Nation, was released by Third Woman Press. Today Dictee is widely studied in contemporary literature classes, including classes on avant-garde writing, feminist and Asian American literature. Elvan Zabunyan wrote the first monograph of Cha's work and published it in 2013.

Reception of Cha's work has ranged dependent on dominant social and artistic discourses across time periods, complicating Cha's intentionality of the work in its evocation of viewer's unconscious associations. In the 1970s, for instance, her work was discussed mostly in terms of formal experimentation in the context of the Bay Area's avant-garde art scene. Feminist theory became the dominant frame for reading her work in the 1980s. Since the early 1990s, Cha's identity as Korean American has been highlighted in reading her work, with qualities of her literary works highlighted through minority literature. Curator and writer Min Sun Jeon notes that these interpretations through dominant paradigms dismiss the tensions Cha emphasized between the particular and the universal, put aside Cha's employment of a nuanced and complex interplay of form and content, and lead to partial understandings of Cha's work.

== Online public portraits ==
According to Cathy Park Hong in Minor Feelings: An Asian American Reckoning, many online photos under Cha's name depict the artist's younger sister, Bernadette Hak-Eun Cha:

Hong states,

When you google Cha, the first author photo that comes up is the film still of her sister Bernadette from her video PERMUTATIONS. This still of Bernadette is often confused for Cha herself... Only one real photo of Cha circulates online. Cha has long hair and wears a black turtleneck and tight jeans. She is in profile, staring out the window of her Berkeley apartment in a studied pose. While this picture is used as her official photo, most readers imagine Bernadette when they think they're imagining Cha."

Further, it is even less noted that Cha herself does appear, for one second, in Permutations at 11:18. It is also not known who is depicted in the clips of the back of a person's head, with long straight black hair, that run throughout the film. There is a recurring cut/splice in these clips that suggests it is either two shots of the back of Bernadette's head, or one shot each of the back of Bernadette's and Theresa's heads, spliced together.

== Published works ==
- — (2001). Terpsichore Choral Dance. Beacon Press.
- — (1998). Dictee and Clio-History. W. W. Norton.
- — (1998). Elitere Lyric Poetry. Berkeley: University of California Press.
- — (1995). Commentaire. Kaya Productions.
- — (1993). Melpomene Tragedy. Penguin.
- — (1987). Clio: History. MIT Press.
- — (1986). Polymnia: Sacred Poetry. Tanam Press.
- — (1982). Pravda ISTINA.
- — (1980). Exilee and Temps Morts. Tanam Press.
- — (1980). Apparatus-Cinematographic Apparatus: Selected Writings (edited by Cha). Tanam Press.
- — (1979). Etang. Berkeley: Line.
- — (1978). Reveille dans la Brume.
- — (1978). Audience Distant Relative. The Little Word Machine Publication.
- — (2001) [1982]. Dictee. Berkeley : University of California Press. ISBN 9780520231122.
- —; Lewallen, Constance; Rinder, Lawrence (2001). The Dream of the Audience. Berkeley : University of California Press. ISBN 9780520232877.
- —; Lewallen, Constance (2009). Exilée and Temps Morts: Selected Works. Berkeley : University of California Press. ISBN 9780520259096.

== Filmography and videography ==
Selected works distributed by Electronic Arts Intermix, Inc., New York

- Secret Spill (1974) 27 min., b&w, sound
- Mouth to Mouth (1975) 8 min., b&w, sound
- Permutations (1976) 10 min., b&w, sound
- Vidéoème (1976) 3 min., b&w, sound
- Re Dis Appearing (1977) 3 min., b&w, sound
- White Dust From Mongolia (1980) 30 min., b&w (uncompleted)

== Performances ==
- Barren Cave Mute (1974), at the University of California, Berkeley.
- Aveugle Voix (1975), at 63 Bluxome Street, San Francisco.
- A Ble Wail (1975), at Worth Ryder Gallery, University of California, Berkeley.
- Life Mixing (1975), at University Art Museum, Berkeley.
- From Vampyr (1976), at Centre des etudes americains du cinema, Paris, inspired by the film Vampyr
- Reveille dans la Brume (1977), at La Mamelle Arts Center and Fort Mason Arts Center, San Francisco.
- Monologue (1977), KPFA Radio Station, Berkeley.
- Other Things Seen. Other Things Heard (1978), at Western Front Gallery, Vancouver, and the San Francisco Museum of Modern Art (SFMOMA).
- Pause Still (1979), 80 Langton Street, San Francisco.
- Exilée (1980), San Francisco Art Institute, SFMOMA, The Queens Museum (1981)
