= Emplumada =

1981 poetry book by Lorna Dee Cervantes

Emplumada is the first collection of poetry authored by Lorna Dee Cervantes. It was published in 1981 by University of Pittsburgh Press.

== Synopsis ==
Cervantes' first full collection of poetry illustrates the unique experience of a Chicana as she is coming of age. As Lynette Seator writes in her analysis of the work, "The poems of Emplumada tell the story of Cervantes' life, her life as it was given to her and as she learned to live it, taking into herself what was good and turning the bad into a comprehension of social context."

The work is split into three sections, with the first moving through the protagonist's childhood, the second and third moving through the protagonist's young adulthood and adulthood in the Mexican barrio of San Jose, California. The subject of the work, a 27-year-old Latina woman, seems to appear consistently throughout the thirty-nine poems. Sometimes, she appears in the first person, while at still other times she appears through an omniscient narrator Seator describes the structure of the poetry as, "an episodic progression through time".

== Major themes ==
=== Abuse ===
In the very first poem, "Uncle's First Rabbit", Cervantes introduces the image of the Uncle, at around ten years old, seeing his father kick his pregnant mother, until his baby sister is born dead.

"... remembering that voice
like his dead baby sister's,
remembering his father's drunken
kicking that had pushed her into birth"

The cycle of abuse continues, as the Uncle adopts similar behavior. Cervantes writes that the Uncle "finds himself slugging the bloodied face of his wife"

The poem "Meeting Mescalito at Oak Hill Cemetery" alludes to abuse. The poem describes the life of a sixteen-year-old girl trying to escape an abusive household. She refers to an abusive stepfather in the lines

"... locked my bedroom
door against the stepfather".

=== Rape ===
In the poems "Lots: I" and "Lots: II", Cervantes directly addresses the topic of rape. "In 'Lots: I' [the protagonist] fights off a rapist ... in the succeeding poem, 'Lots: II' she is the victim of rape." Seator attributes the sequential arrangement to Cervantes' desire to overturn the typical trajectory for a Chicana woman in Chicano/a literature, allowing for the protagonist to assume the place and course of action of a male character in Chicano literature. Seator writes, "her loss of virginity and so of innocence is not the end of her as a viable human being. The author does not, as so many authors before her, do away with the female victim. The poet is determined that she as protagonist live. Loss of innocence is for her, as it has always been for the young male coming of age, a beginning."

=== Identity ===
A source of tension for Cervantes' protagonist emanates from her Chicana identity. "These are poems about the experience of growing up Chicana, poems that break away from old stereotypes rooted in the Mexican tradition and wrapped in the myths and the realities of both the Spanish and the Indian heritage." The protagonist finds herself rooted by her upbringing as a Chicana, but it is the way in which Cervantes presents this upbringing that reconstructs the identity of a Chicana protagonist. She adopts a strength typically associated with masculine characters. Reviewer Thelma T. Renya speaks of this strength in discussing the poem, "For Virginia Chavez", when the protagonist's childhood friend has been beaten by her husband. Renya notes that is femininity and female relationships that emit strength. She writes, "it is the inner strength and solidarity of women that help them prevail."

=== Language ===
Language becomes a source of both vigor and fragility, in that it grants her the ability to communicate, but it also connects her to her Chicana identity. This duality of language finds its crest in the poems "Barco de refugiados" and "Refugee Ship" which exist side by side in the work. Some critics find strength for the protagonist in her use of language. Seator writes, "Language is the linear progression of her history giving her more than a possibility of being. Language is a way of becoming", while other critics find it to be a subjugator: "the worst tool of oppression, in Emplumada, appears to be language," writes Scheidegger. She attributes language to "traumatic memories" and cites the protagonist's lack of words, manifested in intralinear spaces.

== Publication history ==
Cervantes read one poem from her collection, "Refugee ship", at the Quinto Festival de los Teatros Chicanos in 1974. She had travelled to Mexico City with her brother, who was performing at the festival with the Theater of the People of San Jose and was asked to do a reading. Her performance was lauded in newspapers and journals.

The collection is somewhat autobiographical. Lorna Dee Cervantes draws heavily from her own personal experiences and her family history. This has caused some friction with members of her family, such as her uncle, who refused to speak to her for many years after Emplumada was published. Cervantes' personal experiences with racism, sexism, and classism appear constantly in her work.

== Reception ==
The collection was well received by critics. In 1982, Emplumada was awarded the American Book Award. When it was first published, Emplumada circulated mostly in Chicana magazines. The American Book Award, however, opened the text up to much broader attention.

Lorna Dee Cervantes is hailed as a leader of Chicano/a literature. Emplumada was praised for its ability to represent experiences common to Chicano/a readers while resonating with a universal audience. Reviewers raved over Cervantes' ability to capture an underrepresented group.

José Saldívar of Revista Chicano-Requeñ'a wrote "No book has so carefully elucidated what living as a Chicana in the West means.... Emplumada offers a number of troubled and delicate portraits of a woman's world and how that antipatriarchal world has come to have meaning."

John Addiego of Northwest Review wrote, "Throughout Cervantes' book there is the sense that an enormous but generally neglected audience being addressed. The Chicana experience, the long-suppressed voices struggling with racism, sexism, poverty, drug abuse, sexual abuse, is formed into a volume of linguistically rich outcries."
