= Tanam Press =

American publishing house

Tanam Press was an American publishing house founded by Reese Williams in 1980, at 40 White Street in Lower Manhattan, New York City. It published writing and audio by artists, as well as anthologies and experiments in book arts. It is most well known for publishing the poetry collection Dictee by Theresa Hak Kyung Cha. Williams and Cha had been classmates in the UC Berkeley MFA program, and both moved to New York City, where Cha became an editor for Tanam. Other artists who published work with Tanam included Richard Prince, Susan Sontag, and Werner Herzog. Tanam was described by Artnews in 1981 as setting out to "break down distinctions between artists' books and other trade publications."

Over the course of five years, Tanam published individual and collaborative projects from writers, visual and media artists utilizing layout design as an artform. Playing across genre, the publications incorporated critical essays, poetry, experimental prose, photography, film, video and television.

== Books published ==
- Hotel (edited by Reese Williams,1980),
- Of Walking in Ice (Werner Herzog, 1980),
- Apparatus (edited by Theresa Cha, 1980),
- Dictee (Cha, 1982)
- Eating Through Living (Jenny Holzer & Peter Nadin, 1981)
- The Un/Necessary Image (co-edited by d'Agostino and Muntadas,1982),
- Transmission (edited by d'Agostino, 1985),
- Wild History (edited by Richard Prince, 1985),
- Fire Over Water (edited by Williams,1986)
