= Sonia Gutiérrez =

Colombian artist

- Born: 1947 (age 78–79); Cúcuta, Colombia
- Occupation: artist
- Known for: political art

Sonia Gutiérrez (born 1947 in Cúcuta, Colombia) is an artist specializing in drawings, oil paintings, and print making. Her artwork is known for focusing on issues and events occurring in Colombia, particularly as a response to the political climate during the 1970s. Because of the political tone she took in her art, she was exiled from Colombia in the mid 1990s.

== Education ==
Gutiérrez attended the School of Fine Arts at the National University of Colombia. Following this, she continued her studies at Atelier 17 in Paris, a school founded by Stanley William Hayter, an English artist.

== Context ==
Gutierrez was an artist who was raised in and made art out of Colombia.

In the 1930s the country saw a rise in export industry and modernization. At the same time, their government was run by rigged elections through corruption and buying votes. With the growing demand for social change, the Liberal party emerged. Colombia found itself caught between the Conservative and Liberal parties fighting for power. From approximately 1948 to 1958, extreme violence and atrocities began taking place, a period named “La Violencia.” It was essentially an intense political feud between Liberals and Conservatives, causing more than 200,000 people to lose their lives. These deaths were incredibly brutal and cruel as the government was responsible for horrifically torturing people. In 1957, Liberals and Conservatives produced the Declaration of Sitges, agreeing alternation of Conservative and Liberal presidents to alleviate some of the tension and violence. Despite this, violence still continued to occur and citizens were still suffering.

Gutiérrez’s political turmoil with Colombia and pointing out the issues led to her exile.

== Career ==
Gutiérrez held her first group exhibition in 1962, before going to study in France. In the following years, she had solo exhibitions in multiple locations including Bogotá, Cucuta, Medellin, and Bucaramanga, where she displayed several works, such as, Los que son (1968).

Gutiérrez's work was influenced by Pop Art and focuses on the political struggles of Colombia, as seen in her 1972 painting Seguiremos diciendo patria, which portrays a man and a woman being hung upside down by their ankles, with their backs turned to the viewer. In addition, her paintings were representations of the violence between the people and the dictatorship. In 1977, she created the painting Y con unos lazos me izaron (And They Lifted Me Up With Rope), which she based on the case of Dr. Olga López who, along with her five-year-old daughter, was arrested unjustly and tortured by Colombian police officers for two years. The name comes from López's testimony, where she stated that she was tied up with rope and lifted and is meant to represent men and women who were victimized or murdered by the State of Colombia. Gutiérrez does not show the faces of the people she paints but instead discloses their name and situation.

In 2017, Gutierrez was included in a large exhibition at the Hammer Museum entitled "Radical Women: Latin American Art, 1960-1985. Major themes of the exhibition included resistance and fear. These are conveyed in Gutiérrez’s artwork that was displayed that showed a faceless women hung upside down, Y con unos lazos me izaron. In a review of the exhibition, Sara Solaimani noted that the feature of the exhibition is "a dynamic experience that draws the viewer into their bodies, movements, feelings, and thoughts".

== Style ==
Gutiérrez used patterns, textures, and vivid colors to give a sense of pop aesthetic. While many artists continued to work with abstraction or expressionism, Gutierrez transitioned to her new "go-go" period in the 1960s. Then, in the 1970s, she started incorporating political themes and messages in her artwork.

Pop art is an art movement that emerged in the United Kingdom and the United States during the mid-to-late 1950s. The movement presented a challenge to traditions of fine art by including imagery from popular and mass culture, such as advertising, comic books and mundane cultural objects. Artists that were known for creating Pop Art include the American artist, Andy Warhol, with one of his known paintings being the Campbell's Soup Cans in 1962 and Shot Marilyns 1964. The pop art aesthetic that became Gutierrez signature style lead an art critic, Gloria Valencia Diago to label her “go-go de pies a cabeza" (go-go from head to toe). Valencia Diago wrote that Gutiérrez was evolving as an artist and moved from abstractionism to academism with a sense of spontaneity that would make her art more interesting and attract people.

Gutiérrez, while continuing to retain her pop art aesthetic, began to create art that was more political and that in a sense would open communication about the violence that was happening in Colombia. She shifted her artistic pop art career to a more political one in the 1970s, two of her political art pieces, that are popular are titled, "Siguiremos diciendo patria" (We’ll Keep Saying Homeland) and "Y con unos lazos me izaron" (And They Lifted Me Up With Rope). In these pieces, she painted the violence that was occurring, with men and women tied up in ropes, hung upside down.

== Distinctions and honors ==
Gutiérrez received several distinctions and honors during the 1960s: Premio Pintura at the 3rd Salón 10 de mayo (1965), Primer Premio Dibujo at the 10th Salón Cano (1966), honors at the 1st Bienal Iberoamericana de Pintura Coltejer in Medellin (1968) with her painting Pintura Pop (1968, Fourth Prize that Gutiérrez won at the III Salón Nacional de Pintura [Third National Painting Salon] that was organized by Croydon, a private company, in 1967.

== Artwork ==
=== Pintura Pop (Pop Painting), 1968 (acrylic on canvas)[ ===
This was presented at the first Coltejer Biennial in Medellín, Colombia in 1967 with which she won second honorable mention. This artwork shows two faceless females wearing colorful outfits; one wears an orange yellow, and brown dress, and the other wears a light blues skirt with dark blue fringe and a different blue shirt with brown stripes. There is also a fancy chair in the color mustard yellow with a matching rug.

=== Seguiremos diciendo patria (We’ll Keep Saying Homeland), 1972 (acrylic on canvas) ===
This artwork shows both a male and a female with their backs turned to us making them faceless. They both are bound with rope around their ankles and hung upside down, serving as evidence of the torture that the citizens were enduring those times. It shows how people are complacent in their affection for the nation, even after being treated bad in their home country, the title of the artwork shows loyalty and love for it.

=== Cimitarra: Vivo o muerto al aeropuerto (Cimitarra: Alive or Dead at the Airport), 1976 (linocut) ===
This is a black-and-white painting that is showcased amongst other two similar paintings, Mas allá del estado de sitio, and Operación rastrillo. This painting shows two feet and one hand, you can see that there is rope around at least one ankle, but it is in between toes on both feet, and it appears that the person's hand might be bound as well.

=== Mas allá del estado de sitio (Beyond the State of Siege), 1976 (linocut) ===
This is a black-and-white painting that shows two feet facing up with rope around the toes. You can see that the rope is tied around another object as to show how the person was bound to something.

=== Operación rastrillo (Search Operation), 1976 (linocut) ===
This is another black-and-white artwork. You only see disembodied feet with the big toes wrapped around the rope, against a woven background. Unlike her other pieces, it's not visible whether the person painted is hung or if they have fallen.

=== Magdalena Medio, 1977 (acrylic on canvas) ===
This painting is an unusual image of a woman suspended horizontally from a thick rope and ties her right leg and hands to her back with firm knots. She has her back to us, her head hangs from her neck, her left leg twists in the air, she wears her bare feet, a simple white blouse and a brown skirt hanging from her hip.

=== Y con unos lazos me izaron (And They Lifted Me Up With Rope), 1979 (acrylic on canvas) ===
This depicts a faceless woman in a purple dress, hung upside down and bound by rope from her ankles and wrist. It paints the story of a female doctor who was captured and tortured by the government; including being bound with rope. She uses the visual language of pop to describe what was happening in her country.

=== Others ===
Dos cajoncitos de dos en dos, alzan la pata y dicen adios (Two Little Boxes Two By Two, Lift Their Leg and Say Adieu) (1967)

== Exhibitions ==
1967, “19th Sala Gregorio Vásquez,” Biblioteca Nacional, Bogotá

1967, “Salón de Artistas Nacionales,” Biblioteca Luis Ángel Arango, Bogotá

1968, “Bienal Iberoamericana de Pintura Coltejer,” Medellín, Colombia

1968, “1st Bienal de Artes Plásticas,” Lima, Peru

1991, “Artistas santandereanos en la década del 1960,” Museo de Arte Moderno de Bucaramanga, Colombia
