= Dorinda Moreno =

American Chicana

- Education: San Francisco State University
- Known for: Educational activism for Chicano people
- Notable work: La mujer: En pie de lucha, y la hora es ya
- Movement: Chicana feminism

Dorinda Moreno is an American Chicana activist, feminist and writer.

== Early life and education ==
Third oldest of eight brothers and sisters, Moreno aided her parents in raising her other siblings. Her parents worked as migrant farmers until she turned twelve. Her father became a gardener in San Francisco, California.

During her adulthood Moreno became a single mother of three and chose to leave the work force and return to education. She attended college at San Francisco State University, and Stanford University.

== Career ==
At Napa College, Ohlone College, San Francisco State University and DQ University, she taught several different courses such as history, journalism, theater writing, philosophy, and Chicana studies. At San Francisco State University Moreno served as an original first-tier student-led and directed La Raza Studies Department, and founded the La Raza Women's Class. Moreno also directed and founded different cultural groups including Las Cucarachas-Mexcla Teatral and Concilio Mujeres. In 1974, the group took part in the Quinto Festival de los Teatros Chicanos, Teatro Nacional de Aztlan (TENAZ) performed in Mexico City at the Teatro Jorge Negrete, Teotihuacan, Tajin, and Vera Cruz. In 1975, Dorinda attended the International Year of Women in the GDR (German Democratic Republic) which followed by the launching of the Decade of Women, where she presented her signature piece 'La Llorona' to the women of Cuba, South Africa, and Palestine. Concilio Mujeres targeted Chicana's in higher education. The group advocated for Chicana people to participate in higher education and pursue careers. Concilio Mujeres opened an office in the San Francisco Mission District, where Moreno acted as a director in 1974 and 1975. The organization collected material and distributed in an attempt to inform people about the lives of Raza women. The organization received its seed grant from the Catholic Charities with support from Mrs. S. Castaneda, and struggled to find funding and ultimately disbanded by 1980.

== Writing and activism ==
Moreno contributed to Chicana activism when she edited an anthology in 1973 entitled La Mujer: En pie de lucha, y la hora es ya. The anthology contains a series of poems, articles, and essays concerning issues experienced by third world women. Routledge's Encyclopedia of Latin American Literature has credited the anthology, along with five other Chicano works, as "[initiating] the articulation of a repressed feminist consciousness with regard to the issue of women's oppression within the ethnic group" as well as "[ushering] in a period in which hitherto unaccommodated literary voices flourished in all genres."

Moreno joined the Women's Institute for Freedom of the Press (WIFP) shortly after Donna Allen founded WIFP, in 1977. She became one of the first four associates to contribute to the institute.
