= 63 Bluxome =

Collaborative art studio

63 Bluxome was an artist-run space created by John Behanna, Brian McPartlon, Bill Quinlan, Katherine Quinlan, Doug Gower, and Alex Buys and located in the South of Market area of San Francisco that emerged in the mid 1970s, which became recognized as an “alternative space” that presented works of various mediums of art from neighboring artists in a casual and social environment. South of Market provided inexpensive work and exhibit space that could support various venues emerging during that period for artists to exhibit their work.

== History ==
63 Bluxome Street considered the first of this concept in the South of Market area was operated by local area artists and friends and supported either by artists renting gallery space for a nominal fee and/or fundraiser events held at the gallery.

Regular visits from a supportive art critic of the San Francisco Chronicle, Thomas Albright helped artists and alternative spaces flourish throughout the seventies which marked changes in art, presentation and style and allowed emerging artists an opportunity to present work in an open concept space to the public.

The work of numerous artist whose works reflect the unique style influenced by instructors from the San Francisco Art Institute were instrumental in the development of the alternative galleries.

This paradigm shift reflected the social and political sentiment of artists whose work didn't fit into conventional spaces. By opening up the opportunity to explore other avenues numerous alternative spaces began appearing throughout the deserted commercial area of San Francisco known as “South of the Slot” because of its location south of the cable car tracks on Market Street in San Francisco.

The commitment of the artists and people who supported the alternative art movement during the 70's contributed to the Bay Area's regional history, social movements and its unique identity as a significant cultural center.

== Artists and exhibitions ==
- 1974 Oct/Nov “South of the Slot” first south of market show
- 1974 December “Christmas Show”
- 1974/Dec 27/Jan 5 1975 “20 Artists”, Open Studio First Show
- 1975 Feb 22-Mar 3 "Three Painters" Alex Buys, Doug Gower, Brian McPartlon.
- 1975 Mar 14 St. Patrick's Day Benefit/Fundraiser "Life on Earth"
- 1975 April 26/May 25 “Best in the West”
- 1975 June 7/July 24 “Vietnam Series”, Wally Hedrick REVIEW by Alfred Frankenstein/Examiner.
- 1975 July 25/July 28 “Two Works” Reclining Nude 1:1 Joshua Scadron-Wattles
- 1975 September 1- September 12 Ed Lord and Lucinda Grisham
- 1975 September 13 - October 1 “New Work” Fern Friedman, Daniel Goldstein, Al Nodal
- 1975 October 2 Floating Seminar #2 “A Survey of Alternative Art Spaces”
- 1975 October 4 - Oct 25 Michael Kreamer Paintings
- 1975 October 10 - Oct 11 “Recent Videotapes” Joel W. Herman
- 1975 October 17 -Oct 18 “Videotapes” Craig Schiller
- 1975 October 19/Oct 22 “Performance” Jay Miracle
- 1975 October 24 “Reading by SF Poets” Wilfred Castano
- 1975 October 25 “Videotapes” Darryl Sapien
- 1975 November “Dirt to Monsoon, Parts I and II”
- D1976 January 12/Feb 5 “Dominic Alleluia”
- 1976 Feb 7/Feb 21 “8 Artists” Group Show Michael Bell, Gregg Brown, Lew Carson, Jeffrey Long, Nancy Mosen, Sara Richardson, Robert Atkinson, and Bradford Claybourn.
- 1976 Mar 14 Benefit/Fundraiser "Mike Henderson Band"
- 1976 April 10/April 29 Katie Collins, Grady McDonald, Charles Tuggle
- 1976 May 1/May 24 Pepper, Delos, Morvitz
- 1976 June 4/June 13 Koci
- 1976 June 22/July 5 “A Bicentennial Show”
- 1976 July 11/July 18 City College Photography
- 1976 August 20/Sept 3 “Drawings and Sculpture” Hank Stevens, Michelle Goodman, Lisa Siegel
- 1976 Sept 11/Sept 30 Harry Gossage
- 1976 October 3/October 25 Beatrice Hablig and Mark Green
- 1976 November 12/December 3 "Paintings, Drawings, Installations" Wendy Mascaro, Marion Ketrick, John Ketrick, Josie Roth. Poetry by Pat Simonton.
- 1976 December 17/Dec 31 “Friends of Bluxome”
- 1977 February City College Photography
- 1977 February 18/Feb 28 Hillary Mosberg and July Bradberry
