= Third Woman Press =

Queer and feminist-of-color publisher forum

- Founded: 1979
- Founder: Norma Alarcón
- Official website: thirdwomanpress.com

Third Woman Press (TWP) is a Queer and Feminist of Color publisher forum committed to feminist and queer of color decolonial politics and projects. It was founded in 1979 by Norma Alarcón in Bloomington, Indiana. She aimed to create a new political class surrounding sexuality, race, and gender. Alarcón wrote that "Third Woman is one forum, for the self-definition and the self-invention which is more than reformism, more than revolt. The title Third Woman refers to that pre-ordained reality that we have been born to and continues to live and experience and be a witness to, despite efforts toward change ..."

The press closed down in 2004 due to a lack of funds and energy. It was reopened in 2011 by Alarcón with the help of Christina L. Gutiérrez and Sara A. Ramírez.

TWP was revived to honor and continue the legacy of women of color publishing. It has also published works by notable women of color such as Gloria Anzaldúa's Living Chicana Theory (1998), Cherrie Moraga's The Sexuality of Latinas (1993), Carla Trujillo's Chicana Lesbians: The Girls Our Mothers Warned Us About (1991), Theresa Hak Kyung Cha's Writing Self, Writing Nation: A Collection of Essays on Dictee by Theresa Hak Kyung Cha (1994) and Ana Castillo's The Sexuality of Latinas (co-editor, with Norma Alarcón and Cherríe Moraga) (1993).

TWP believes that language, art, and media are tools for creating dynamic social change. The tools expand access to the work of activist scholars and artists dedicated to liberation from the historical injustices of colonialism and imperialism. They also encourage readers to collaborate with them to envision a world for women of color that incorporate migratory, diasporic, and indigenous women both within and beyond U.S. national borders.

== Early Stages ==
In 1979, Norma Alarcon, then a graduate student at the Spanish and Portuguese Department in Indiana University, attended the Midwest Latina Writer's Workshop. In attendance were other Latina writers such as Sandra Cisneros and Ana Castillo. At the workshop the ten women in attendance discussed the lack of representation of Latina authors and voices. This discussion, according to Alarcon, was the beginning of the Third Woman Press.

In terms of financial support, Alarcon received funding from the Indiana University but, in order to ensure the press’ independence she secured funding from various units at the university. Due to the grassroots aspect of the press, Alarcon even had to learn how to typeset and did most of the typesetting for the first issue of the press.

== Re-Opening ==
Due to lack of fundings and Alarcon's poor health, the Third Woman Press shut down in 2004. However, in 2011 it was reopened by Sara A. Ramirez and Christina L. Gutíerrez. In Publishing Work that Matters: Third Woman Press and its Impact on Chicana and Latina Publishing, Ramirez claims that Alarcon's generation was the first generation of “Chicana thinkers helping give voice to women of color issues”. Consequently, Ramirez stated she felt some kind of duty to continue the work of Alarcon and other Chicana feminists and decided to revive the press as an homenaje to feminists of color.

Ramirez and Alarcon began exchanging emails in March 2011 and, after some encouragement from strangers, she decided to ask Alarcon about restarting the press. Alarcon replied to Ramirez by saying “You may adopt my child. 'One way of looking at it, another way, is that generationally speaking, you could be my ‘grandchild’ and ‘heir’ to an interrupted project.” and agreed to help guide Ramirez in her endeavor.

Soon after other feminists of color joined Ramirez and helped her set up social media pages, sell books at conferences and, a year after the reopening, they organized fundraisers throughout the United States.

== This Bridge Called My Back ==
Regarded as one of TWP's most notable works, This Bridge Called My Back was initially published in 1981 and later republished for its third edition by TWP in 2002. None of the staff working on this project were full-time employees of TWP and were all volunteers or interns.

=== Themes ===
This Bridge Called My Back broke new ground and was instrumental in introducing intersectionality into mainstream feminist discourse. It explores sexuality, racism, and immigration. The book has been praised not only for highlighting the differences between women but for using “... these differences as catalysts for personal and social change.”

=== Use of Visual Arts ===
According to the TWP website, the third issue is "...further brought to life with the incorporation of visual art by seventeen noted women of color artists." The images, which are mainly from the same period as the book's original publishing date, were chosen by Celia Herrera Rodriguez. Rodriguez wrote that the pictures chosen are absent from academic discourse about art in the book's postface. Rodriguez continued to say that the few times these texts are given recognition, they are viewed through a Eurocentric lens.

=== Foreword and Bibliography ===
Published shortly after the 9/11 terrorist attack, this edition includes a new foreword by Cherne L. Moraga addressing the attack. Moraga commented on the rise of extreme patriotism, Muslim hatred, and the refusal of the United States to acknowledge the mistakes that led to the attacks. Moraga also writes about the emergence of intersectionality and the increase of women of color as prominent participants in socio-political movements in the same foreword. Moraga ends her introduction by claiming that despite the social and political progress made since This Bridge Called my Back was first published, racism still exists.

This edition of Bridge also added a bibliography with works published by women of color since the original publishing of the book.

== Chicana Lesbians: The Girls Our Mothers Warned Us About ==
Published by TWP in 1991, Chicana Lesbians: The Girls Our Mothers Warned Us About is an anthology edited and curated by lesbian writer Carla Trujillo.

=== Themes ===
One of the most prominent themes in the anthology is food. Authors used typical Chicano foods to portray lesbian sexual desire and refer to female body parts. The queering of Chicano food validates the women's wants and feelings in a Chicano context.

== See also ==
- Chicana feminism
- Black feminism
- Third-world feminism
- List of Mexican American writers
- List of women writers
