= Bernice Zamora =

American poet

Bernice B. Ortiz Zamora (born January 20, 1938) is an American Chicana poet, "one of the preeminent poets to emerge from the Chicano movement of the 1960s and 1970s". She received a B.A. in English and French from Southern Colorado State College (now Colorado State University Pueblo) and an M.A. in English from Colorado State University in Fort Collins in 1972. In 1972, she enrolled in the English doctoral program at Marquette University and transferred to Stanford University the following year, where she ultimately received her Ph.D. in 1976. Besides being an accomplished poet, Zamora also taught classes in ethnic studies, Chicano studies, and literature at Santa Clara University, Stanford University, University of California, and University of San Francisco. She has served as a guest editor and co-editor for various publications, including the Chicano literary journal El Fuego de Aztlán, De Colores with José Armas, Flor y Canto IV with Armas, and Flor y Canto V with Michael Reed.

== Influences ==
Zamora's work was influenced by Chicano cultural traditions, spirituality, sexism, cultural suppression, unfair labor practices, identity issues, and love. Moreover, the regions of Southern Colorado are also heavily featured throughout her work, as well as the American Southwest. She uses the American Southwest in her work to explore questions and themes of colonization.

== Work ==
Zamora's first collection of poetry, Restless Serpents, was jointly published in 1979 with José Antonio Burciaga. The first edition included a limited printing of only 2,000 copies, over time has become an important in the Chicano literary canon. Restless Serpents is written in both English and Spanish. Critics have praised her poetry for their "lyrical beauty, evocative power, and complexity of thought and feeling." The themes she employs in her poetry include sexism, ethnic and racial oppression.

== Bibliography ==
- Restless Serpents (1979)
- Releasing Serpents (1994)
- Bellow (1997)
- Recalling Richard (1997)
- "Contraries" (1998)
- "Glint" (1998)
- "Silence at Bay," in Máscaras (1997)
