= Librotraficante =

American protest movement

Librotraficante (English: Book Trafficker) was an American protest movement. It began in response to a 2012 decision by the Arizona Superintendent for Public Instruction calling for the removal of books from classes that "promote the overthrow of the United States government, foster racial and class-based resentment, favor one ethnic group over another, or advocate ethnic solidarity". Protesters organized a caravan which transported more than 1,000 banned books into Arizona. The caravan was relaunched in 2017 to coincide with a hearing about ethnic-studies courses in the Arizona Supreme Court. The protest received the Robert B. Downs Intellectual Freedom Award at the American Library Association's Midwinter meeting in 2013.

== History ==
In January 2012, Arizona Superintendent for Public Instruction John Huppenthal ruled that Mexican-American studies classes being held in the Tucson Unified School District violated Arizona law ARS 15-112, which forbade classes that "promote the overthrow of the United States government, foster racial and class-based resentment, favor one ethnic group over another, or advocate ethnic solidarity". As a result of this ruling, the classes were "converted ... to standard grade-level courses with a general curriculum", and books used in these courses were removed from classrooms and "moved to the district storage facility". These actions were met with significant protests, including school walk-outs.

The Librotraficante movement was one of the protests arising from the decision. Led by author and activist Tony Diaz, the movement comprised a caravan from Houston, Texas to Tucson in March 2012. The caravan included authors of books removed from classrooms as well as intellectual-freedom activists, and was intended to "smuggle [the removed books] back into the state" while raising awareness of the decision and promoting Latino literature. It gathered over one thousand copies of the books to create "underground libraries". The caravan made stops in El Paso, Texas and Albuquerque, New Mexico along its route, and established a library with some of the books at a Tucson youth center.

Diaz launched the movement with a one-minute, forty-one-second video that introduced three new words to the political discussion: "Librotraficante" ("someone who smuggles banned books back into Arizona"), "wet-book" (a book smuggled into the state by the caravan for use in "underground classes to illegally conduct Latino literary studies"), and "dime book" (a paperback once valued at $10 "but now invaluable 'thanks to your fascist laws, Arizona'").

The caravan was relaunched in 2017 to coincide with a hearing about ethnic-studies courses in the Arizona Supreme Court.

== Impact on other high schools ==
According to a July 2015 article in The Atlantic, the Librotraficante movement led to the introduction of ethnic-studies courses in other high schools in Arizona, California, and Texas.

== Awards ==
In 2013 Librotraficante received the Robert B. Downs Intellectual Freedom Award at the American Library Association's Midwinter meeting.
