= Norma Alarcón =

Author and professor

- Born: November 30, 1943 (age 82); Villa Frontera, Coahuila, Mexico
- Occupations: Professor and publisher
- Years active: 20th century
- Known for: Third Woman Press, Chicana feminism
- Title: Professor Emerita

Academic background
- Education: Indiana University (PhD and BA)
- Thesis: "Ninfomanía: El Discurso feminista en la obra de Rosario Castellanos" (1983)

Academic work
- School or tradition: Chicana feminism
- Institutions: University of California, Berkeley
- Notable students: Jasbir Puar
- Main interests: Chicana feminism, sexuality, Postcolonial feminism
- Notable works: This Bridge Called My Back (contributor, publisher and translation co-editor)

Norma Alarcón (born November 30, 1943) is a Chicana author and publisher in the United States. She is the founder of Third Woman Press and a major figure in Chicana feminism. She is Professor Emerita of Chicano/Latino Studies at the University of California, Berkeley.

== Biography and schooling ==
Norma Alarcón was born in Villa Frontera, Coahuila, Mexico on November 30, 1943. Her family immigrated to San Antonio, Texas in 1955 in order to find work, and settled in Chicago, Illinois by the end of that same year. There, her father worked as a steelworker and her mother worked as a candy packer for Marshall Fields.

Alarcón graduated from the Catholic school St. Thomas the Apostle in 1961 as a member of the National Honor Society and started college at DePaul University, but left in 1962 to marry her first husband. She had her only son, Joe McKesson, in 1964. Later, Alarcón returned to school at Indiana University Bloomington to graduate Phi Beta Kappa in 1973 with a degree in Spanish literature and a minor in comparative literature. She then entered the PhD program in Spanish literature at Indiana University. Despite the combined pressures of going through her first divorce, raising a son, making a living, and working on her PhD program, Alarcón founded Third Woman Press in 1979 and completed her dissertation, Ninfomanía: El Discurso feminista en la obra de Rosario Castellanos, a theoretical study of Mexican feminist literary criticism, in 1983.

Alarcón taught in the Foreign Language department at Purdue University in Indiana from 1983 until she received the Chancellors Postdoctoral Fellowship at the University of California, Berkeley in 1986 and got hired by the Ethnic Studies department there in 1987. She received tenure there in 1993.

Alarcón was a Professor of Comparative Ethnic/Indigenous Studies, Women's Studies, and Spanish, as well as the founder and publisher of Third Woman Press, which she began as a journal in 1979 when she realized that "there weren't enough other women of color or Latinas for me to have a conversation with." After printing about six issues of the journal that each focused on a different geographical region of the United States, she transformed the project into an independent press in 1987. The press published more than thirty books and anthologies until 2004, when Alarcón had a health crisis that left no time to continue her unpaid volunteer work with the press and led her to retire from the University. Alarcón is cited for her substantial contributions to "postmodern Chicana feminism."

== This Bridge Called My Back ==
Alarcón has a long history with This Bridge Called My Back, an anthology of writing by women of color. She published an essay in the 1981 Persephone Press edition of Bridge called "Chicana's Feminist Literature: A Re-vision Through Malintzin/or Malintzin: Putting Flesh Back on the Object." As founder of Third Woman Press, Alarcón published the third edition of This Bridge Called My Back from 2002 to 2008. She also co-edited the Spanish translation, Esta puente, mi espalda: Voces de mujeres tercermundistas en los Estados Unidos along with Cherríe Moraga and Ana Castillo.

== See also ==
- Black feminism
- Chicana feminism
- Third-world feminism
- List of Mexican American writers
- List of women writers
