= Radke Martinez Regional Shoreline =

Park in Contra Costa County, California, United States

Coordinates: 38°01′34″N 122°07′55″W

Radke Martinez Regional Shoreline Park
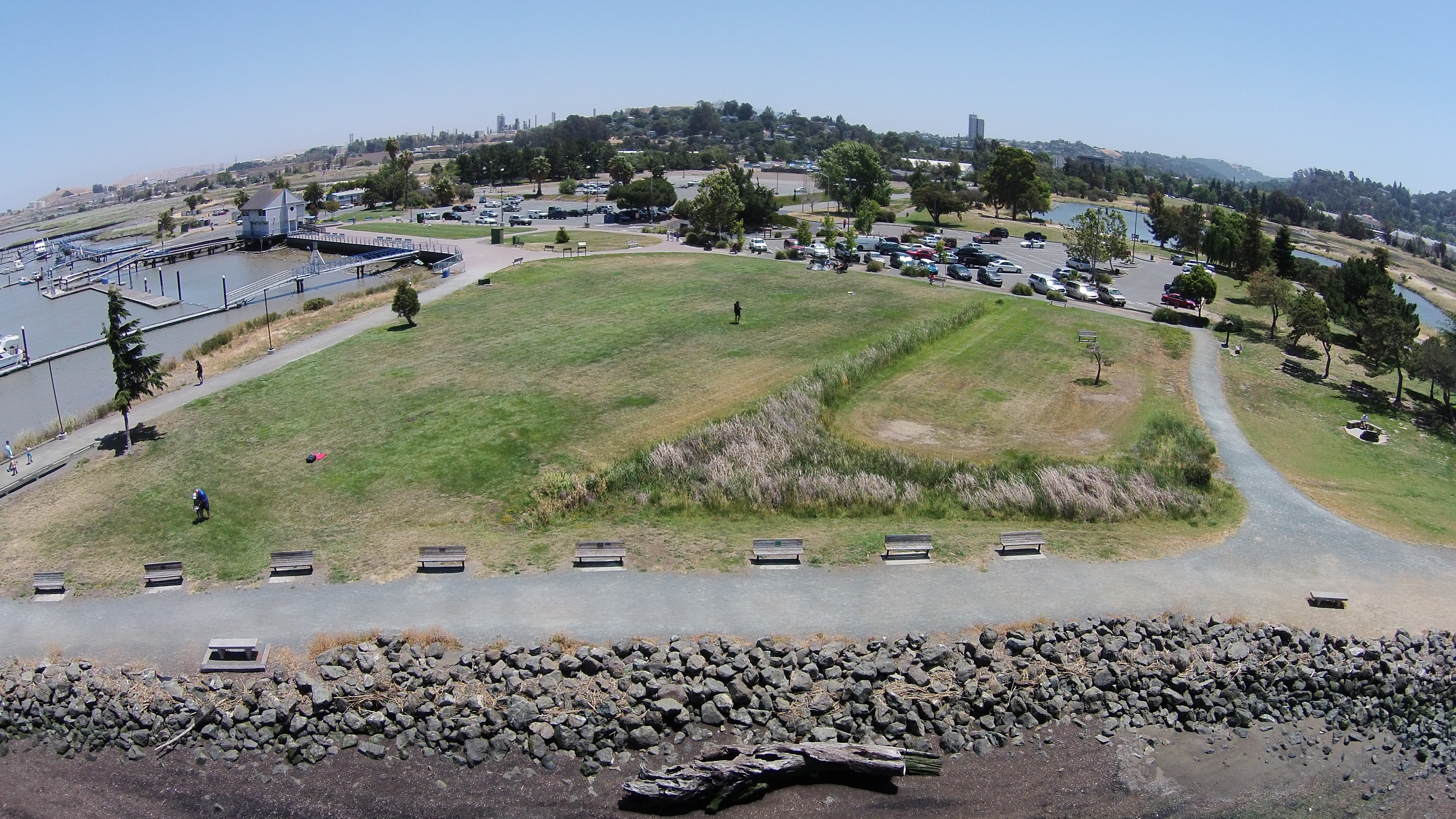
- Aerial view of Radke Martinez Regional Shoreline Park, with the Martinez Marina on left
- Interactive map of Radke Martinez Regional Shoreline Park
- Type: Regional Shoreline
- Location: Contra Costa County
- Nearest city: Martinez, California
- Area: 343 acres (1.39 km^{2})

Radke Martinez Regional Shoreline (RMRS) is a regional park on the shoreline of Carquinez Strait in Martinez, located in northern Contra Costa County, California. Formerly known as the Martinez Regional Shoreline, it was renamed on December 6, 2016, in honor of Ted Radke and his wife Kathy Radke. (Note: Both Ted and Kathy Radke were active environmentalists. Together, they co-founded the Contra Costa Ecology Action Education Institute. Ted, who died August 28, 2016, had served on the EBRPD Board from 1978 to 2014, was the longest-serving member of the board. Among his many accomplishments, he was credited with creating the Carquinez Strait Regional Shoreline, Crockett Hills Regional Park, Alvarado Staging Area at Wildcat Canyon Regional Park and the permanent entrance at Kennedy Grove Regional Recreation Area. Kathy, who died in 2011, had worked to preserve Mt. Wanda from development and to preserve Franklin Hills as open space.)

== Features ==
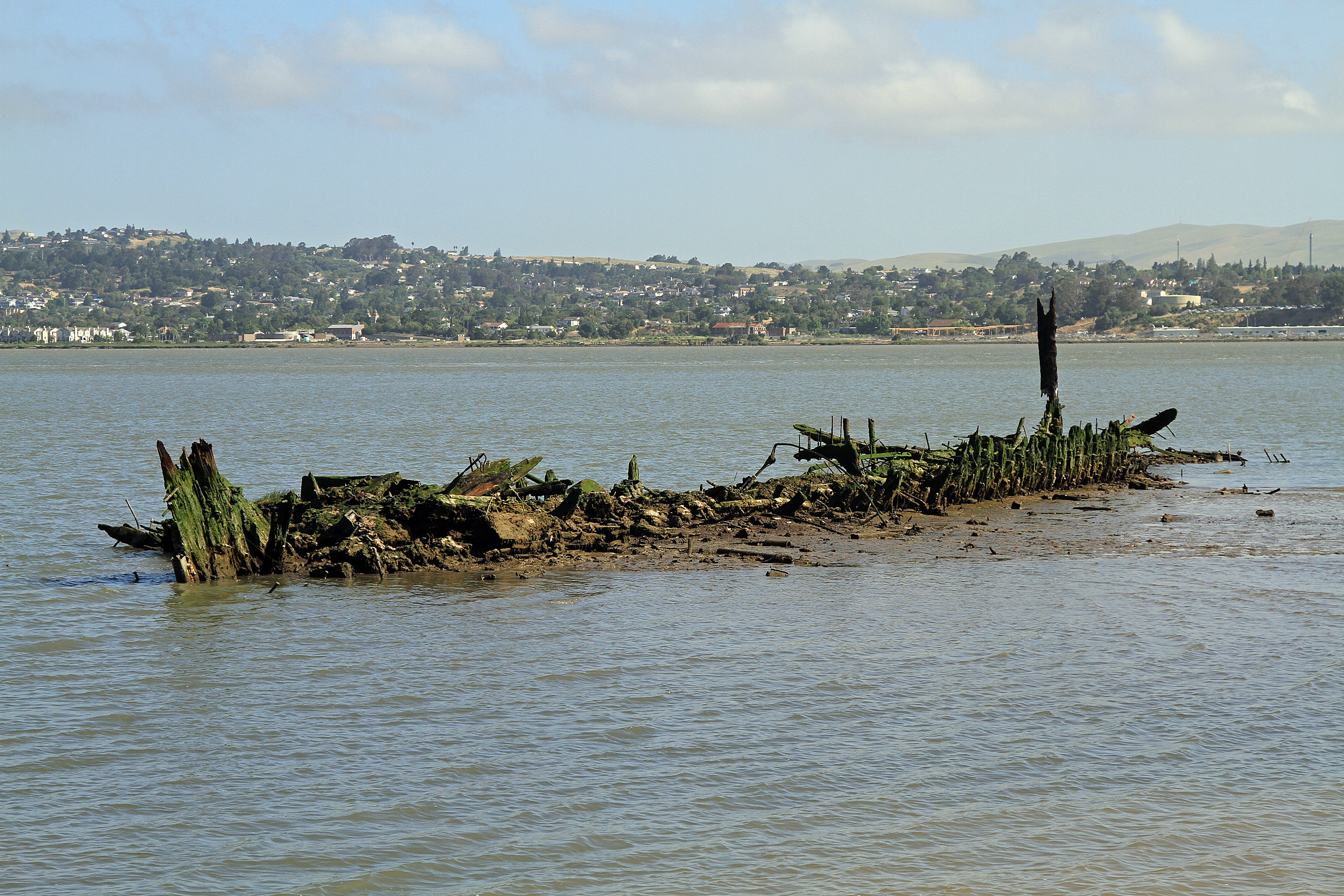
The remains of the Forester

The park covers 343 acres (1.39 km^{2}), and is part of the East Bay Regional Park District (EBRPD) system. In the eastern section of the park there are group picnic areas, softball fields, bocce ball courts, and soccer fields. In the western section there are open lawns, small family picnic areas, ponds and creeks, and 3 miles (4.8 km) of trails through the marsh and along the shoreline.

Near the shore are the remains of Forester, a 1900 schooner.

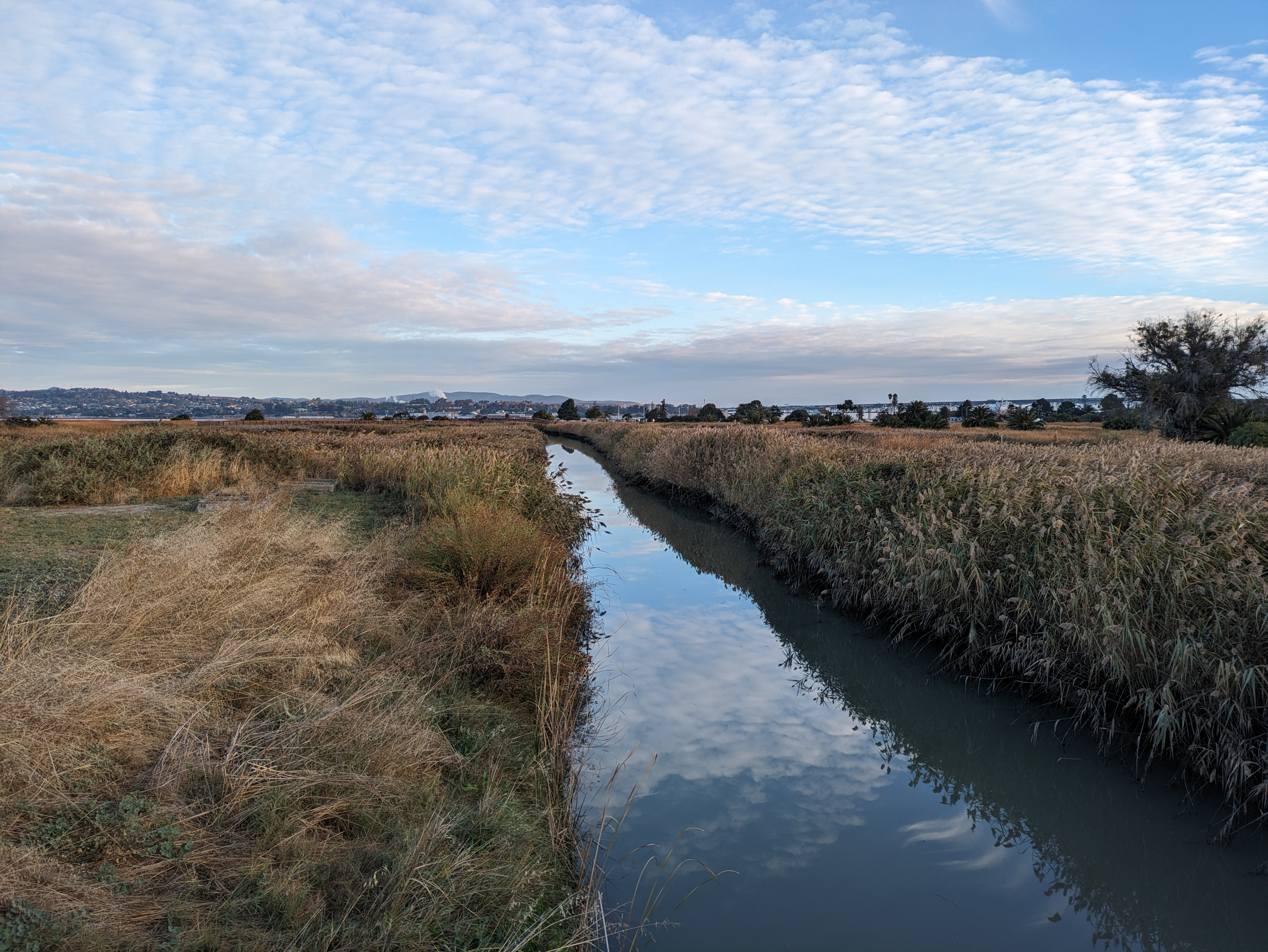
Radke Martinez Regional Shoreline

The 500 miles (800 km) long San Francisco Bay Trail passes through the park.

The Carquinez Strait Regional Shoreline continues to the west along Carquinez Strait, through Port Costa to Crockett and the Crockett Hills Regional Park.

== See also ==
- Parks in Contra Costa County, California
