= Swett (surname) =

Swett is the surname of:

- Benjamin Swett, American photographer and writer
- Emelie Tracy Y. Swett (1863–1892), American poet, author, editor
- James E. Swett (1920–2009), US Marine Corps World War II fighter ace and Medal of Honor recipient
- John Swett (1830–1913), founder of the California public school system
  - John Swett High School in Crockett, California, U.S.
  - John Swett Unified School District
- Jorge Swett (1926–2012), Ecuadorian muralist, painter, lawyer and writer
- Katrina Swett (born 1955), consultant
- Leonard Swett (1825–1889), American lawyer who advised President Lincoln
- María Elena Swett (born 1979), Chilean actress
- Pop Swett (1870–1934), baseball player
- Richard Swett (born 1957), American politician
