= John Swett =

American politician

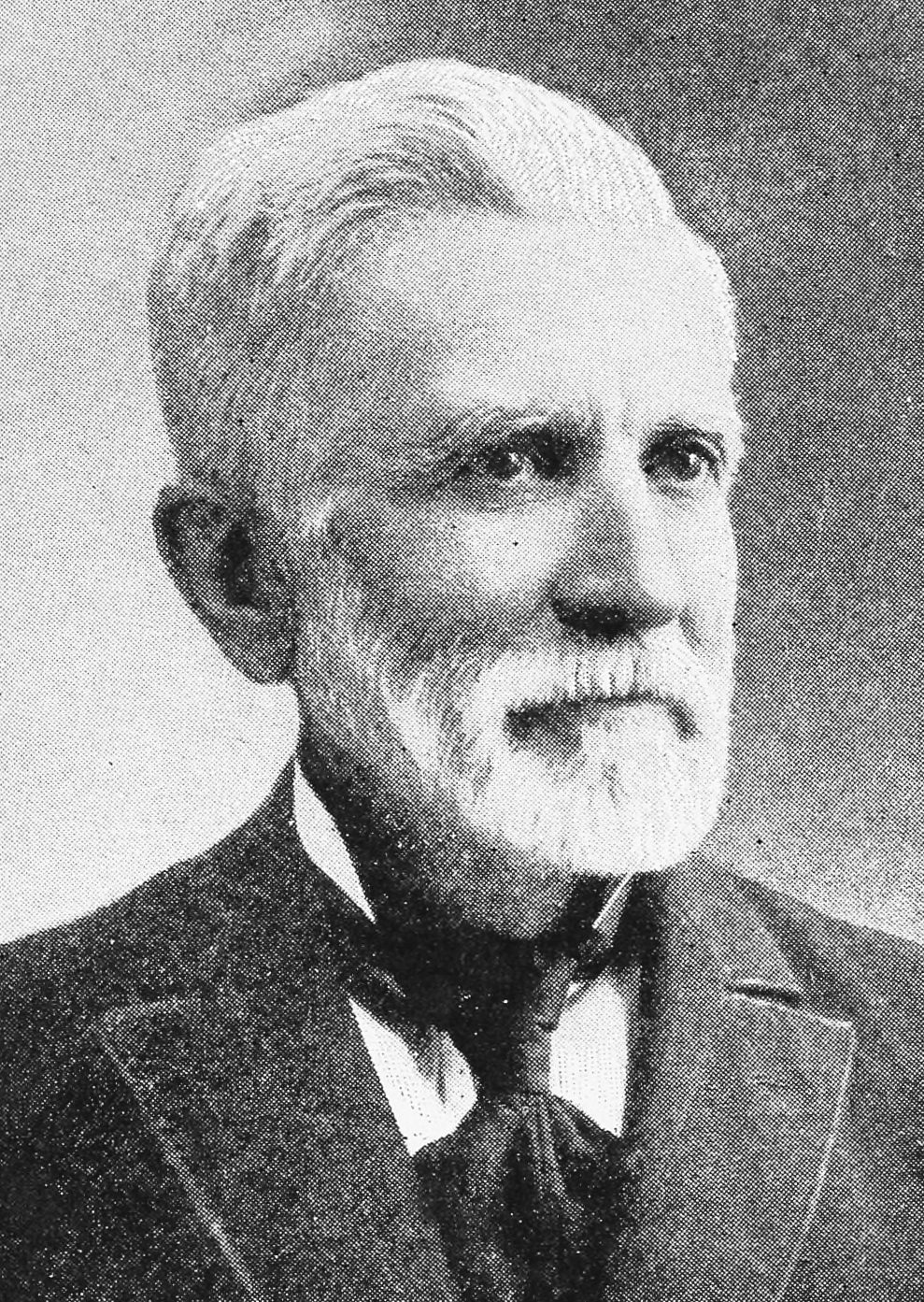
- Swett c. 1899

4th California State Superintendent of Public Instruction
- In office January 2, 1863 – December 2, 1867
- Governor: Leland Stanford; Frederick Low
- Preceded by: Andrew J. Moulder
- Succeeded by: Oscar Penn Fitzgerald

Personal details
- Born: July 31, 1830 Pittsfield, New Hampshire
- Died: August 22, 1913 (aged 83) Alhambra Valley, CA
- Party: National Union Party(Republican)
- Spouse: Mary Louise Tracy (b. Dec 8, 1839, Thompson Ct - ?)
- Children: Emelie Tracy Y. Swett Parkhurst (Mar 9, 1863), William Russell Swett (Oct 1, 1868), Frank Tracy Swett (Nov 22, 1869), Walter Harper Swett (July 20, 1870), Helen Swett (Apr 7, 1875), and John French Swett (Aug 1, 1879)
- Parent(s): Lucretia (née French) Swett, Eben Swett
- Profession: Politician, Teacher, Principal

John Swett (July 31, 1830 – August 22, 1913) is considered to be the "Father of the California public school" system and the "Horace Mann of the Pacific".

== Biography ==
Swett c. 1863–1867

John Swett was an only child born July 31, 1830, in Pittsfield, New Hampshire, to Lucretia (born French) Swett and Ebenezer Swett, who were Congregationalists. He died August 22, 1913, in Alhambra Valley, near Martinez, California. He married Mary Louise (Tracy) Swett on May 8, 1862, in Sonoma, and they had 6 children. During his life he was a close friend of Sierra Club co-founder John Muir. Swett arrived in California in 1853 to mine gold but quickly sought work as a teacher in San Francisco. In 1862 he became a Freemason, joining San Francisco's Phoenix Lodge No. 144.

In 1863 he was instrumental in founding the California Educational Society, which would become the California Teachers Association, the largest teachers' union in the state of California. Running in 1862, during the Civil War, as a National Union Party (Republican) candidate he was elected California State Superintendent of Public Instruction and served until 1867. Other positions he held were Deputy Superintendent of the San Francisco Public Schools (1870–1873), Principal of the Denman School (1873–1876) and Girls High School (San Francisco) (1876–1889); the School Board there was dissatisfied with his administration because he had taken no steps toward its accreditation by the University of California and because no women had been sent to the university since 1884.

In 1890 he was elected superintendent of the San Francisco Public Schools on the Republican and Reform Democratic tickets.

In 1895 he retired to his estate, Hill Girt Ranch.

== California State Superintendent of Public Instruction (1863-1867) ==
His most important accomplishment was making the California school system free for all students. In his report for 1866–67, he stated: "The school year ending June 30, 1867, marks the transition period of California from rate-bill common schools to an American free school system. For the first time in the history of the State, every public school was made entirely free for every child to enter."

== Criticism ==
In his 1878 book The Poison Fountain Zachariah Montgomery criticized, among other things, Swett's autocratic style. He states the following on page 111:

It must be remembered that Superintendent Swett maintains the proposition that parents have no remedy against the teachers, and that:

"As a general thing the only persons who have a legal right to give orders to the teacher are his employers, namely, the committee in some States, and in others the directors or trustees. If his conduct is approved by his employers the parents have no remedy as against him or them." (See Swett's Biennial Report, 1864, page 166.)

And we must not forget that this same superintendent has said that: " The vulgar impression that parents have a legal right to dictate to teachers is entirely erroneous."

In his 1876 book, History of the Public School Systems of California, Swett becomes one of the first Californian educators to specify that mature children actually belong to the state or society, writing:

"Children arrived at the age of maturity belong, not to the parents, but to the State, to society, to the country."

== Tributes ==
- John Swett Award for Media Excellence, awarded yearly by the California Teachers Association
- John Swett High School in Crockett, California
- John Swett Elementary School in Martinez, CA
- John Swett Unified School District in Contra Costa County, California
- On the day of his funeral (August 25, 1913), nearly every school in California closed in honor of Swett.

== Books and other works ==
- His papers have been donated by his children to the Bancroft Library at the University of California, Berkeley: Guide to the John Swett Papers, 1853-1913, Bancroft Library Staff, University of California, Berkeley
- Also donated to the Bancroft Library were the papers of the Tracy family (Swett's wife's family): Tracy family papers (ca. 1800-1888), Collection Number: BANC MSS Z-Z 107
- History of the Public School System of California, by John Swett
- Methods of Teaching, by John Swett

== See also ==
- George H. Atkinson, Founder of the Oregon Public school system
