= Sweat (disambiguation) =

Sweat is the fluid excreted by the sweat glands during perspiration.

Sweat or sweating may also refer to:

== Places ==
- SWEAT (hypothesis), which proposes that the Southwestern United States was at one time connected to East Antarctica
- Sweat Mountain, in the U.S. state of Georgia

== People ==
- Brooke Sweat (born 1986), American beach volleyball player
- David Sweat, convicted murderer who escaped from the Clinton Correctional Facility in Dannemora, New York on June 6, 2015
- John B. Sweat (1827–1893), Wisconsin state legislator
- Josh Sweat (born 1997), American football player
- Keith Sweat (born 1961), R&B/soul singer, songwriter and record producer
- Lorenzo De Medici Sweat (1818–1898), former U.S. Representative from Maine
- Montez Sweat (born 1996), American football player
- Noah S. Sweat (1922–1996), judge, law professor and state representative in Mississippi
- T'Vondre Sweat (born 2001), American football player

== Arts, entertainment, and media ==
=== Films ===
- Sweat (2002 film), Sueurs, a French action film
- Sweat (2008 film), a short LGBT-related film, see List of LGBT-related films of 2008
- Sweat (2020 film), a Swedish-Polish drama film

=== Literature ===
- Sweat (play), a 2015 play by Lynn Nottage
- "Sweat" (short story), by American writer Zora Neale Hurston
- Sweat (novel), a 1934 novel by Jorge Amado
- The sweats, an alternate name for the men's adventure genre of magazines

=== Music ===
- Sweat (concert tour), a 2024 concert tour by Charli XCX and Troye Sivan

==== Albums ====
- Sweat (Hadise album), 2005
- Sweat (Kool & the Gang album), 1989
- Sweat (Melanie C album), 2026
- Sweat (Nelly album), 2004
- Sweat (The System album), 1983

==== Songs ====
- "Sweat" (Bow Wow song), 2011
- "Sweat" (Ciara song), 2013
- "Sweat" (Hadise song), 2004
- "Sweat" (Snoop Dogg song)
- "Sweat" (The All-American Rejects song), 2017
- "Sweat" (Zerobaseone song), 2024
- "Sweat (A La La La La Long)", a song by Inner Circle from their 1993 album Bad to the Bone
- "Sweat", a song by Tool from Opiate, 1992
- "Sweat", a song by Oingo Boingo from Good for Your Soul, 1983
- "Sweat", a song by the Jon Spencer Blues Explosion from Orange, 1994
- "Sweat", a song by Zayn from Nobody Is Listening, 2021
- "Sweat", a song by Melanie C from Sweat, 2025
- "Sweat", a song by Lisa from Press Play, 2026
- "Sweat", a 1981 single by Brick

=== Television ===
- Sweat (Australian TV series), Australian drama series
- Sweat (Canadian TV series), Canadian TV series

== Heat ==
- Sweat lodge, a hut, typically dome-shaped and made with natural materials, used by Indigenous peoples of the Americas for ceremonial steam baths and prayer
- Sweating (cooking), heating vegetables in a little oil or butter, without any watery liquid
- Sweating, a labour practice relating to sweatshops
- Soldering, a term in metalwork sometimes referred to as sweating

== Other uses ==
- Sweating sickness, a mysterious disease which struck between 1485 and 1551
- Sweating, a method of coin debasement

== See also ==
- Sweet (disambiguation)
- Swett (disambiguation)
