= Carquinez Strait Regional Shoreline =

Regional park in California, US

Coordinates: 38.049365°N 122.193023°W

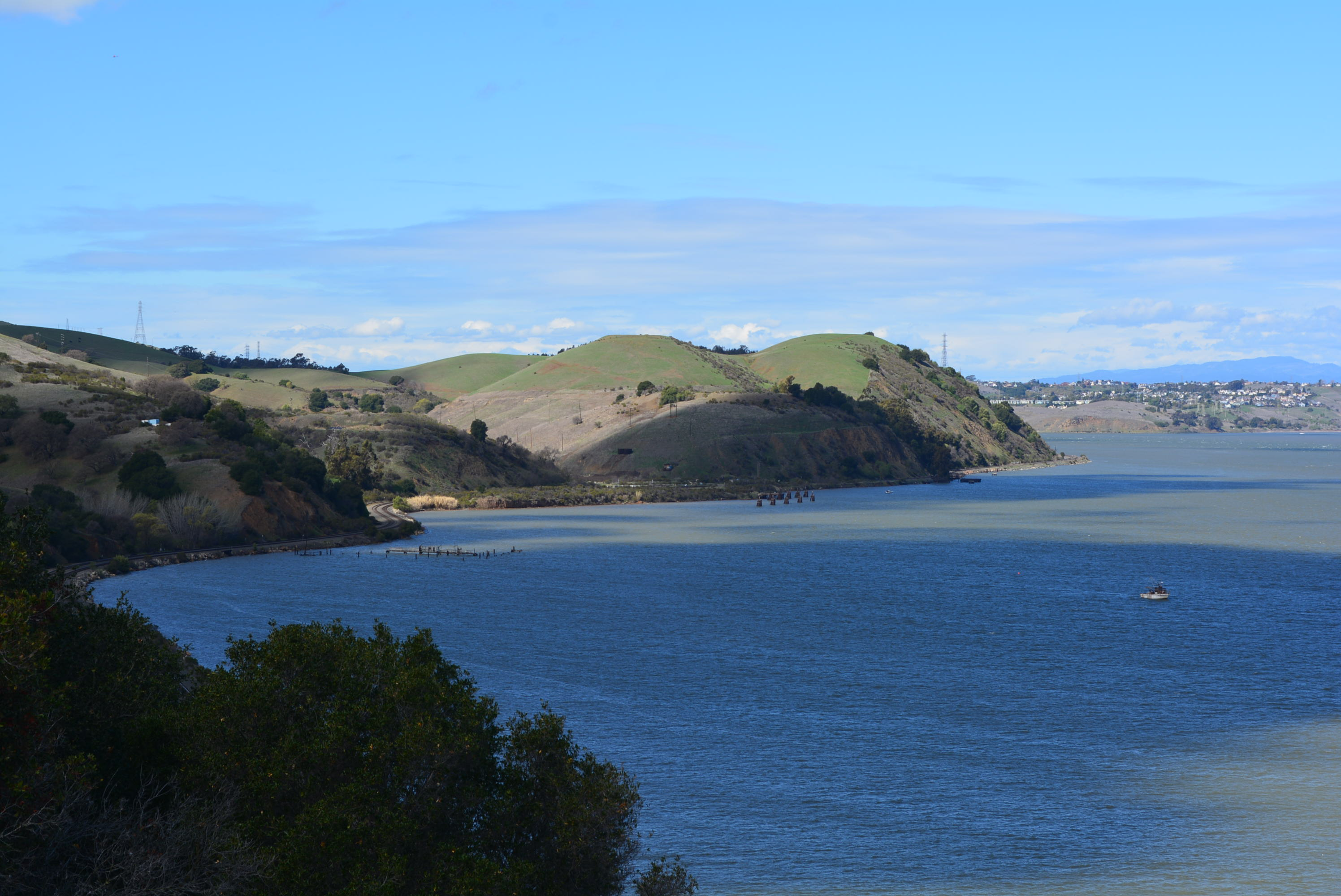
- Carquinez Strait Regional Shoreline, March 1, 2014. Photo courtesy of Federico Pizano
- Interactive map of Carquinez Strait Regional Shoreline
- Location: Contra Costa County, California
- Nearest city: Martinez, California; Port Costa, California
- Area: 1,400 acres (5.7 km^{2})
- Operator: East Bay Regional Park District
- Open: All year

Carquinez Strait Regional Shoreline is a regional park, part of the East Bay Regional Park District system, located in northwestern Contra Costa County, California.

== Geography ==
The park, which is divided into two sections by privately owned property, is located on the southern shoreline of the Carquinez Strait and eastern San Pablo Bay and in the adjacent hills, within the East Bay region of the San Francisco Bay Area. The total area of the park is 1,400 acres (5.7 km^{2}).

The steep coastal hills rise as much as 750 feet (230 m) above the strait.

The western park section extends from Crockett and Crockett Hills Regional Park eastward to Port Costa.

The larger eastern park section extends from expansive natural open spaces in the Crockett Hills, eastward to the city of Martinez, the Martinez Regional Shoreline park, and the John Muir National Historic Site. Trails in the Crockett Hills have unobstructed views across Carquinez Strait to Suisun Bay, Benicia, and southern Solano County.

== Trails ==
The 500 miles (800 km) - long San Francisco Bay Trail passes through the park. Part of the Bay Area Ridge Trail also passes through the Crockett Hills area of the park.

The state built the 1.7 miles (2.7 km)-long Carquinez Scenic Drive along the southern shore of the strait in 1912. Decades later, it turned the road over to Contra Costa County. Major storms and landslides in 1983 caused huge gaps in the road, forcing its permanent closure to auto traffic. Instead, the county decided to convert the abandoned road into a trail for exclusive use by hikers, joggers, cyclists and equestrians. EBRPD negotiated with Contra Costa County for nearly a decade before it reached agreement in December 2012 on an easement that allowed the conversion of the idle roadway to a trail. Even so, it still cost about $5.5 million to install piers, drains and walls to ensure stability of the new trail. It took several years to obtain sufficient funds for this project. (Note: Other funds came from the State Coastal Conservancy, Contra Costa Transportation Authority Measure J and the Park District's Measure WW Development.) The new trail, which did not open for public use until autumn 2014, was named for former U.S. Representative George Miller (D-Martinez), who was instrumental in obtaining $3.5 million in Federal funds for the project.

== See also ==
- Carquinez Strait
- Parks in Contra Costa County, California
