= Swett =

Swett may refer to

== Places in the United States ==
- Swett, South Dakota, an unincorporated community in Bennett County
- Swett Ranch, Daggett County, Utah
- Swett-Ilsley House, Newbury, Massachusetts
- John Swett High School, Crockett, California

== Other ==
- Swett (surname)
