= Floyd Peters =

American football player and coach (1936–2008)

- Peters in 1959

No. 73, 72, 78
- Position: Defensive tackle

Personal information
- Born: May 21, 1936; Council Bluffs, Iowa, U.S.
- Died: August 19, 2008 (aged 72); Reno, Nevada, U.S.
- Listed height: 6 ft 4 in (1.93 m)
- Listed weight: 254 lb (115 kg)

Career information
- High school: John Swett (Crockett, California)
- College: San Francisco State
- NFL draft: 1958: 8th round, 93rd overall pick

Career history

Playing
- Baltimore Colts (1958)*; Salinas Packers (1958); Cleveland Browns (1959–1962); Detroit Lions (1963); Philadelphia Eagles (1964–1969); Washington Redskins (1970)
- * Offseason or practice squad member only

Coaching
- New York Giants (1974–1975) Defensive line; San Francisco 49ers (1976) Defensive line; Detroit Lions (1977–1981) Defensive line; St. Louis Cardinals (1982–1985) Assistant head coach/defensive line; Minnesota Vikings (1986–1990) Defensive coordinator; Tampa Bay Buccaneers (1991) Defensive coordinator & defensive line coach; Tampa Bay Buccaneers (1992–1994) Defensive coordinator; Oakland Raiders (1995–1996) Defensive line coach

Awards and highlights
- Second-team All-Pro (1967); 3× Pro Bowl (1964, 1966, 1967)

Career NFL statistics
- Fumble recoveries: 8
- Interceptions: 3
- Sacks: 33.0
- Stats at Pro Football Reference
- Coaching profile at Pro Football Reference

Floyd Charles Peters (May 21, 1936 – August 18, 2008) was an American professional football defensive tackle in the National Football League (NFL) and went to three Pro Bowls during his 13-year career. He played college football at San Francisco State University and was selected in the eighth round of the 1958 NFL draft. He was a defensive coach for over 20 years in the NFL.

== Early life ==
Peters was born on May 21, 1936, in Council Bluffs, Iowa. He was raised in Martinez, California, and attended John Swett High School in Crockett, California, graduating in 1954. He played both offense and defensive lines on the school's football team, playing nearly the full sixty minutes per game. He was All-County tackle and selected as the school's top football player as a senior.

== College ==
He attended San Francisco State University in San Francisco, playing defensive tackle under coach Vic Rowan. As a freshman, he was 6 ft (1.83 m) and 190 pounds (86.2 kg). Peters averaged 58 minutes a game during his career there. In 1955, his sophomore year, Peters was selected first-team All-Far Western Conference, and United Press International (UPI) named him first-team Little All Coast; honors he would win again over the next two years. He was a first team Little All American at guard, and led the team to a Far Western Conference title. It has also been reported he was a third-team Little All American at tackle (1957). Peters was the first person drafted into the NFL from San Francisco State. As a senior, he starred in the East West Shrine game. He is a member of the San Francisco State Gators Hall of Fame.

== NFL playing career ==
The 6 ft 4 in (1.93 m) Peters was drafted 93rd overall in the eighth round of the 1958 draft by the Baltimore Colts, but was cut before the season started where he was considered too small to play tackle at 225 pounds (102.1 kg). He then played semi-pro football for the Salinas Packers, until an NFL scout recommended him to Cleveland Browns' coach Paul Brown. Peters signed with the Browns in 1959 and played there four years; winning a starting job in 1960, playing at 250 pounds (113.4 kg). In his final year with the Browns (1962), he started all 14 games, had an interception, a fumble recovery and three quarterback sacks.

He was traded to the Detroit Lions for the 1963 season, where he replaced Alex Karras during the future Pro Football Hall of Famer's year-long gambling suspension by Commissioner Pete Rozelle. He started all 14 games and had 4.5 sacks, but Peters was expendable after Karras' return, and was traded the following year to the Philadelphia Eagles along with future Pro Football Hall of Fame player Ollie Matson, for offensive tackle J.D. Smith.

Peters played with the Eagles for six years, being named to the Pro Bowl in three of those years (1964, 1966-67) as a defensive lineman. He was named outstanding lineman in the 1966 Pro Bowl. In 1964, 1966 and 1967, The Sporting News named him first-team All-Conference.

In the Eagles 1968 training camp, Peters had Eagles teammate Mark Nordquist (an offensive guard) work on pass rushing with Peters before morning practice and following afternoon practice, educating Nordquist on offensive technique in the process. Peters asked to be traded in 1970 when the Eagles were focusing on younger players.

He played his final year in Washington in 1970 as a player-coach. Peters played the left defensive tackle position during his career. He defended well against the pass and the run. Over a 12-year career, he had three interceptions, eight fumble recoveries and 33 sacks.

== NFL coaching career ==
After retiring, Peters was a scout for the Miami Dolphins from 1971 to 1973, working in San Francisco. He had also worked as a stockbroker between his playing and coaching days.

Peters became a full-time coach for the first time in 1974. He was hired by Bill Arnsparger as a defensive line coach for the New York Giants (1974–1975). He later held the same role with the San Francisco 49ers (1976–1977), Detroit Lions (1978–1981), and Oakland Raiders (1995–1996). He was an assistant head coach/defense for the St. Louis Cardinals (1982–1985), and a defensive coordinator for the Minnesota Vikings (1986–1990) and the Tampa Bay Buccaneers (1991–1994) where he also took on defensive line coach duties in 1991.

Peters emphasized the importance of quarterback sacks as the defense's central focus in establishing dominance. Beginning in 1976, he used the "54" defense scheme, a four-man front where the defensive linemen shift slightly to the weak side, and the linebackers overshift to the tight end's side.

In San Francisco, his defensive squad was known as the "Gold Rush" and in Detroit, the "Silver Rush". In 1976, the 49ers led the league with 61 sacks. In 1978, the Lions set a club record with 55 sacks, ranking second in the NFL behind the Dallas Cowboys' 58 sacks. In 1983, the Cardinals led the NFL in sacks with 59. The Vikings defense was ranked first in the NFL in 1988 and 1989. The team had 71 sacks in 1989, one short of the NFL record. Defensive tackle Keith Millard, the AP NFL defensive player of the year, had 18 sacks (even though missing games with an injury), and Chris Doleman had 21.

Peters nickname in Tampa was Sgt. Rock. He was also well known in Tampa Bay for wearing bright orange pants to practice.

== Death ==
Peters died in Reno, Nevada, on August 8, 2008, of complications from Alzheimer's Disease. Peters was survived by four sons (Craig, Allen, Dean and Kelly) and his wife of 51 years, Nancy. In 2014, Peters' estate joined a lawsuit filed by Dan Marino and other former players against the NFL for concussion related injuries.
