= Port Costa School =

- U.S. National Register of Historic Places
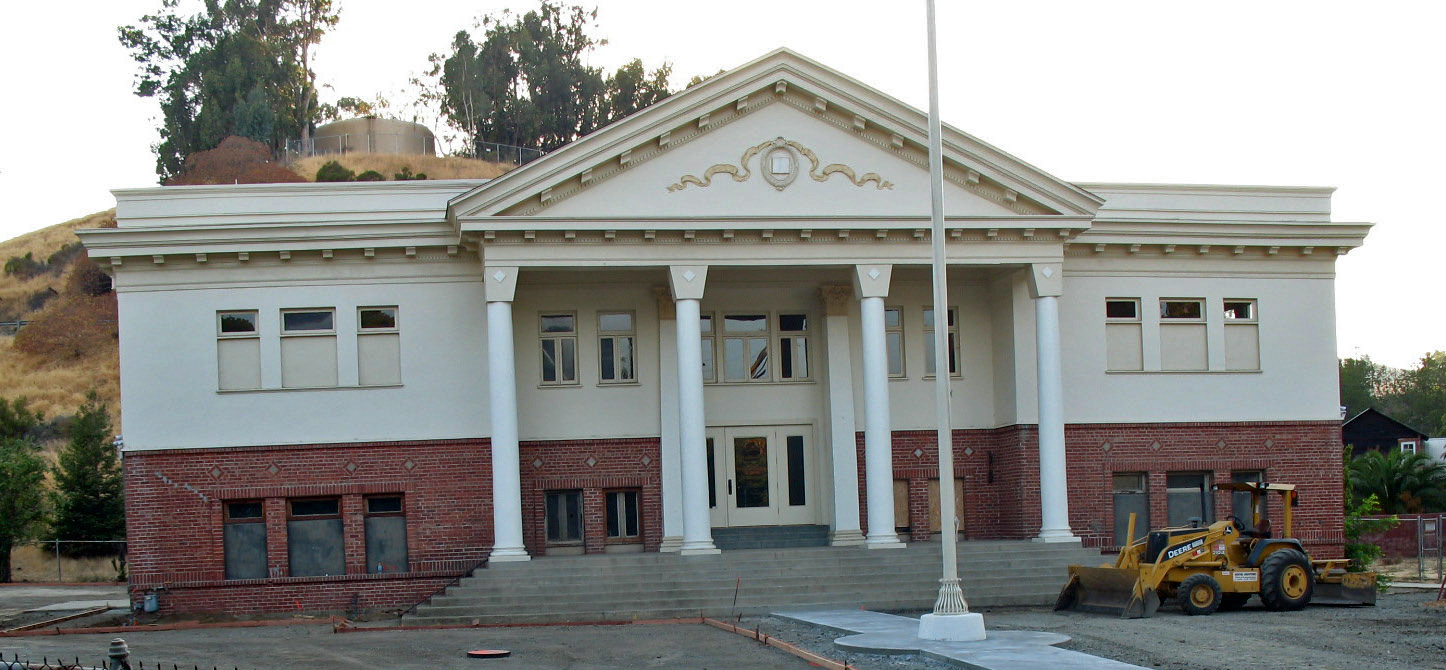

- Location within California Location within the United States
- Location: Plaza El Hambre, Port Costa, California
- Coordinates: 37°57′40.73″N 121°45′45.33″W
- Area: 2.2 acres (0.89 ha)
- Architect: William Wilde
- Architectural style: Classical Revival
- NRHP reference No.: 88000563
- Added to NRHP: May 25, 1988

Port Costa School National Register 88000563

The Port Costa School was built to serve the community of Port Costa, California. Residents voted to fund the school with a bond in April 1911, and construction began later that year. The classic revival style building was designed by architect William Wilde, who immigrated to America from Denmark. The school opened in 1912 and closed in 1966 due to a declining population. At this point, it had become part of the John Swett Unified School District.

The school building now serves as an event space and is maintained by the Port Costa Conservation Society.

== See also ==
- National Register of Historic Places listings in Contra Costa County, California
