= Walter Kittredge =

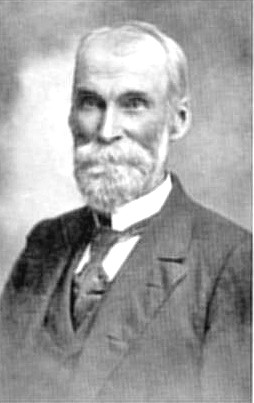
Walter Kittredge

Walter Kittredge (October 8, 1834 – July 8, 1905), was a famous American minstrel and songwriter. Over his career he wrote over 500 songs, many of them dealing with themes of abolitionism and the American Civil War, the most famous of which was Tenting on the Old Camp Ground.

Kittredge was born in Merrimack, New Hampshire, the tenth of eleven children. His father Eri Kittredge was a farmer and owned a brickyard. Kittredge attended Merrimack Normal Institute in the winter months when not helping his father, graduating in 1851.

Kittredge was a talented self-taught musician who played the seraphine, the melodeon (types of reed-like organs), and the violin. He aspired originally to be a singer and actor; upon turning 21 he set out on a solo tour of neighboring counties with his melodeon, interspersing songs with recitations. The next year he began touring with the Hutchinson Family, a musical troupe; this professional association that lasted 20 years. In this time he began composing songs; by 1862 he had amassed enough songs and reputation to publish his Union Song Book; containing some of his most Popular Songs, Humorous and Sentimental.

Kittredge had been drafted into the American Civil War in 1862 but failed his physical; his family paid for a substitute. Soon after he composed his most famous song, Tenting on the Old Camp Ground, also known as "Tenting Tonight", which was sung by both sides of the war and is known throughout the world. Kittredge composed it in a single night in 1863 after returning from a visit with the Hutchinsons in High Rock, Lynn. Kittredge had originally offered the song to Boston publisher Oliver Ditson for $15 and been rejected; but a few months later when Ditson was seeking to publish a patriotic tune that they purchased it. Ten thousand copies were sold within the first three months, and its success was so long-lasting that it was reported its royalties in 1897 surpassed all prior years.

"Tenting on the Old Camp Ground"
Kittredge's "Tenting on the Old Camp Ground"' performed by the United States Army Field Band and Chorus with a vocal introduction, was a favorite of the Union Army during the American Civil War.

Kittredge was also a noted supporter of abolitionism and the Temperance movement. He performed at the 1866 National Union Convention, the 1876 Centennial Exposition, the 1893 Columbian Exposition, and was popular with veterans' groups. He was one of many cultural names made an honorary member of Hawaii's Kauai Kodak Club and invited to visit Hawaii by E. S. Goodhue.

He married Annie E. Fairfield in 1861. He died in 1905 in Merrimack, NH. His archives, including his melodeon, are housed at the New Hampshire Historical Society. A plaque honoring him hangs in the New Hampshire State House.

== Selected compositions ==
- No Night There (1874)
- Golden Streets
- The War Will Soon Be Over
- The War Is Over
- When They Come Marching Home (1864)
- I'm a Child of the Mountain (1864)
- Life's Cares (1865)
- Make My Grave in the Lowland Low (1865)
- The Old Log House
- Scatter the Flowers Over the Blue and Gray (1889)
- Let's Sing Again the old War Songs
- Sing the Old War Songs Again
- Good-by, Uncle Caleb

Published in the Union Song Book:

- Liberty and Union
- As We Journey On Together
- Look Out For Number One
- There Must be Some Mistake
- That's the Vay the Vorld Goes
- You Can See It Every Day
- The Curiosity
- I'm Sitting To-Day
- The Red, White, and Blue
- Trot Him Off
- Washington
- Bonnie Doon. A Parody
- If a Bargain can be Made
- Joys Departed
- A Gonner
- Gentle Hallia
- The Fashionable Hats
- Medley on the Times
