= Tenting on the Old Camp Ground =

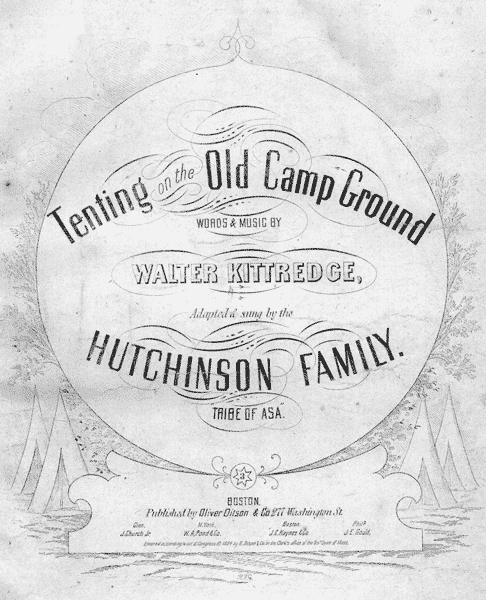
- Cover, sheet music, 1864

Song
- Language: English
- Written: 1863
- Published: 1864
- Songwriter(s): Walter Kittredge

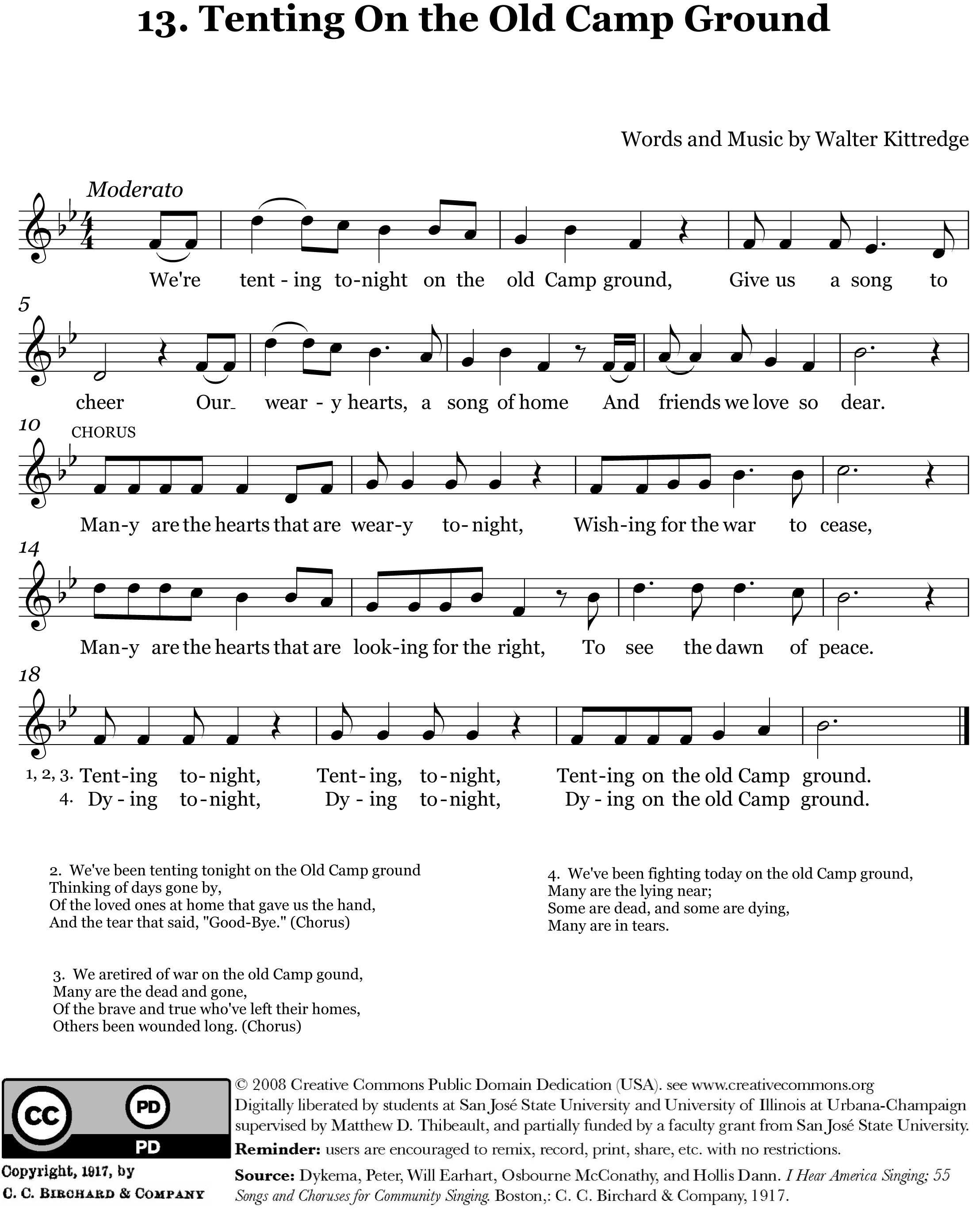
Sheet music version

"Tenting on the Old Camp Ground"
Walter Kittredge's "Tenting on the Old Camp Ground" performed by the United States Army Field Band and Chorus with a vocal introduction

"Tenting on the Old Camp Ground" (also known as Tenting Tonight) was a popular song during the American Civil War. A particular favorite of enlisted men in the Union army, it was written in 1863 by Walter Kittredge and first performed in that year at Old High Rock, Lynn, Massachusetts.

A tableau vivant was given on May 29, 1897, in the auditorium of Girls High School (San Francisco) by Union Army veterans, at right, who sang Tenting on the Old Camp Ground.

A Methodist camp meeting variant appeared with title "Tenting Again" in 1869, using the same tune but words modified for the religious environment.

Charles Ives later quoted the song in his own political song, "They Are There," changing the lyrics to "Tenting on a new campground"—referring to a worldwide social democracy.

== Lyrics ==
Lyrics from the original sheet music:

We're tenting tonight on the old camp ground,
Give us a song to cheer
Our weary hearts, a song of home
And friends we love so dear.

Chorus:
Many are the hearts that are weary tonight,
Wishing for the war to cease;
Many are the hearts looking for the right
To see the dawn of peace.
Tenting tonight, tenting tonight,
Tenting on the old camp ground.

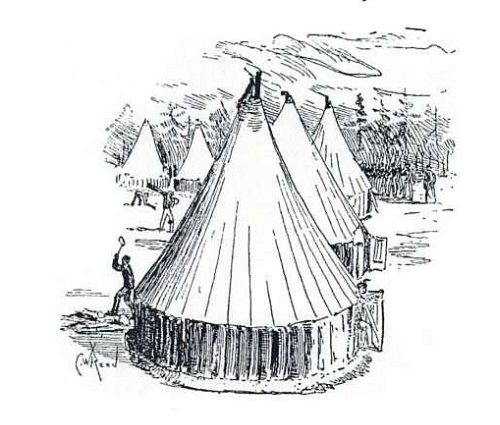
"A Day in Camp" (1861-1863)—Hardtack and Coffee.

We've been tenting tonight on the old camp-ground,
Thinking of days gone by,
Of the loved ones at home that gave us the hand,
And the tear that said, "Good-bye!"
Chorus

The lone wife kneels and prays with a sigh
That God his watch will keep
O'er the dear one away and the little dears nigh,
In the trundle bed fast asleep.
Chorus

We are tenting tonight on the old camp ground.
The fires are flickering low.
Still are the sleepers that lie around,
As the sentinels come and go.
Chorus

Alas for those comrades of days gone by
Whose forms are missed tonight.
Alas for the young and true who lie
Where the battle flag braved the fight.
Chorus

No more on march or field of strife
Shall they lie so tired and worn,
No rouse again to hope and life
When the sound of drums beat at morn.
Chorus

We are tired of war on the old camp ground,
Many are dead and gone,
Of the brave and true who've left their homes,
Others been wounded long.
Chorus

We've been fighting today on the old camp ground,
Many are lying near;
Some are dead, and some are dying,
Many are in tears.

Final Chorus:
Many are the hearts that are weary tonight,
Wishing for the war to cease;
Many are the hearts looking for the right,
To see the dawn of peace.
Dying tonight, dying tonight,
Dying on the old camp ground

== Bibliography ==
- Billings, John D.; Charles W. Reed (illus). Hardtack and Coffee: The Unwritten Story of Army Life. Boston: George M. Smith & Co. (1887).
- Kittredge, Walter. "Tenting on the Old Camp Ground" (Sheet music). Boston: Oliver Ditson & Co. (1864).
- Smith, Nicholas, Col. Stories of Great National Songs. Milwaukee: The Young Churchman Co. (1899).
