= Elizabeth Fleischman =

American radiographer (1867–1905)

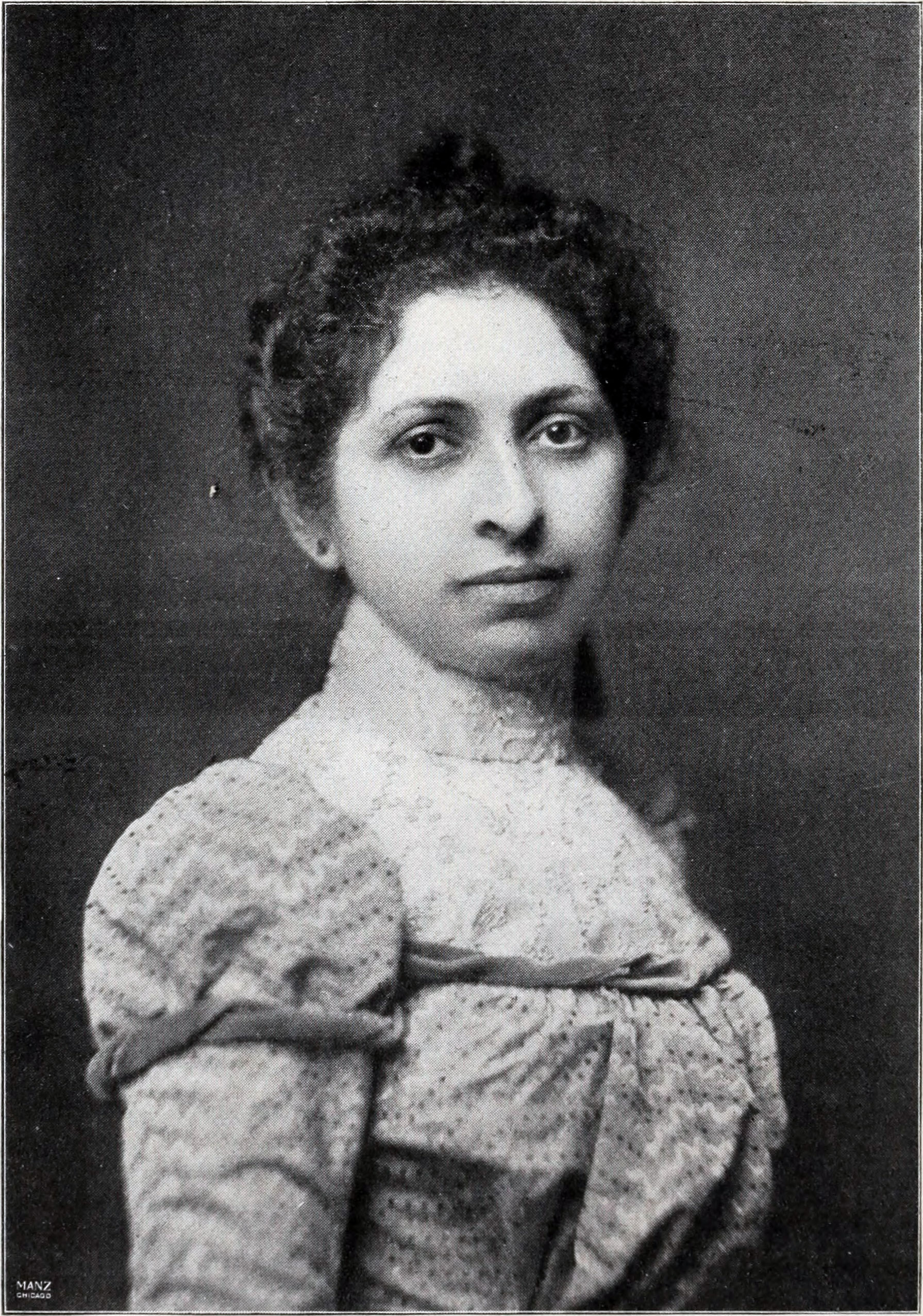
- Elizabeth Fleischman in 1899
- Born: March 5, 1867; El Dorado County, California, U.S.
- Died: August 3, 1905 (aged 38)
- Education: Girls High School (San Francisco)

Elizabeth Fleischman-Aschheim (née Fleischman; March 5, 1867 – August 3, 1905) was an American radiographer who is considered a pioneer of X-ray technology. Fleischman was the first woman to die as a result of X-ray radiation exposure.

== Early years ==
Elizabeth Fleischman was born in El Dorado County, California (possibly in Placerville), on March 5, 1867, the daughter of Jewish immigrants from the Austrian Empire. Her mother, Katherine Lezansky was born in Prague and had several family members who were physicians in what is now the Czech Republic. Her father, Jacob Fleischman, was a baker. Elizabeth was one of five children.

By 1876, the family had moved to San Francisco, where Elizabeth's father worked first as a baker and later as a merchant who sold various sundries and cigars. Elizabeth Fleischman attended the Girls' High School and dropped out in her senior year in 1882, to help support her family. She then took courses in bookkeeping and office management, and for a time she worked as a bookkeeper at Friedlander and Mitau, a San Francisco underwear manufacturer.

Upon the death of her mother, Fleischman moved in with her sister Estelle, who was married to English physician and surgeon Michael Joseph Henry Woolf. Fleischman worked in the office of Woolf's medical practice as a bookkeeper, where he shared and supported her curiosity in the new medical technology of X-rays.

== Career ==
In 1896, Fleischman read of Wilhelm Röntgen's breakthrough with X-rays in Vienna, Austria: "A new photographic discovery" which sparked her interest in radiography. In August 1896, she attended a public lecture by and presentation on X-ray apparatus by Albert Van der Naillen in San Francisco. Later that year, she enrolled in the Van der Naillen School of Engineering and took a course of study in electrical science, in part influenced by Van der Naillen's lecture and encouragement of her physician brother-in-law.

Upon completion of the course of study, she borrowed funds from her father to purchase X-ray apparatus and a fluoroscope. Fleischman quickly exhibited a keen interest and became proficient with the various apparatus that were necessary to produce the X-rays.

By 1897, one year after the discovery of X-rays by Röntgen, she had established an X-ray laboratory on Sutter Street in San Francisco. There she examined patients on behalf of local physicians. This work required expertise in both anatomy and photography in order to produce clear images.

In 1898, American newspapers reported the results of her work bombarding commercially traded foods with X-rays in order to detect the presence or absence of "adulteration" by impurities. She also began to take X-ray images of animals and common objects, such as the interior of a shoe.

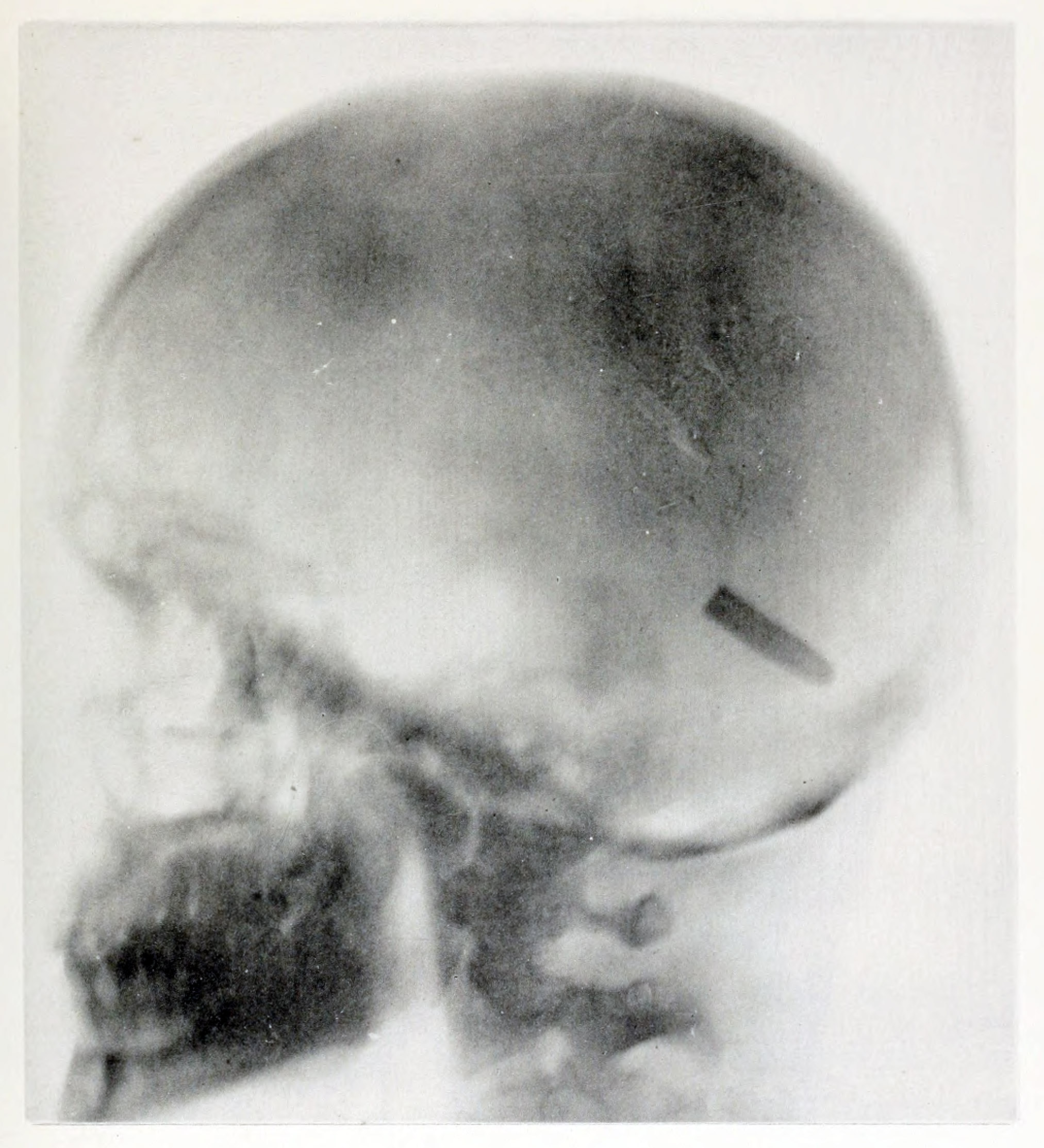
Radiograph by Elizabeth Fleischman of the skull of Private John Gretzer Jr. showing a bullet lodged in the brain.

In December 1898, she began to provide services as a radiographer to the United States Army, who had been sending wounded soldiers from the Spanish–American War's Pacific theater back to the United States through San Francisco.

On August 20, 1899, she took one of her most famous radiographs, an image showing a Mauser 7 mm bullet lodged in the brain of John Gretzer Jr., in the region of the left occipital lobe. Private Gretzer, of the 1st Nebraska Volunteers, wounded at Mariboa, Philippines on March 27, 1899 during the Spanish–American War. The private later returned to duty as a mail clerk. Accounts of the case were reported in the 1902 edition of The International Text-Book of Surgery and in newspapers. Another case of a bullet lodged in a soldier's skull, X-rayed by Fleischman was also reported in newspapers in 1899.

She received praise for her work during the Spanish–American War from the Surgeon General of the Army George Miller Sternberg. Several of her radiographs were also used by William C. Borden to illustrate his book on the medical use of X-rays in the Spanish-American War.

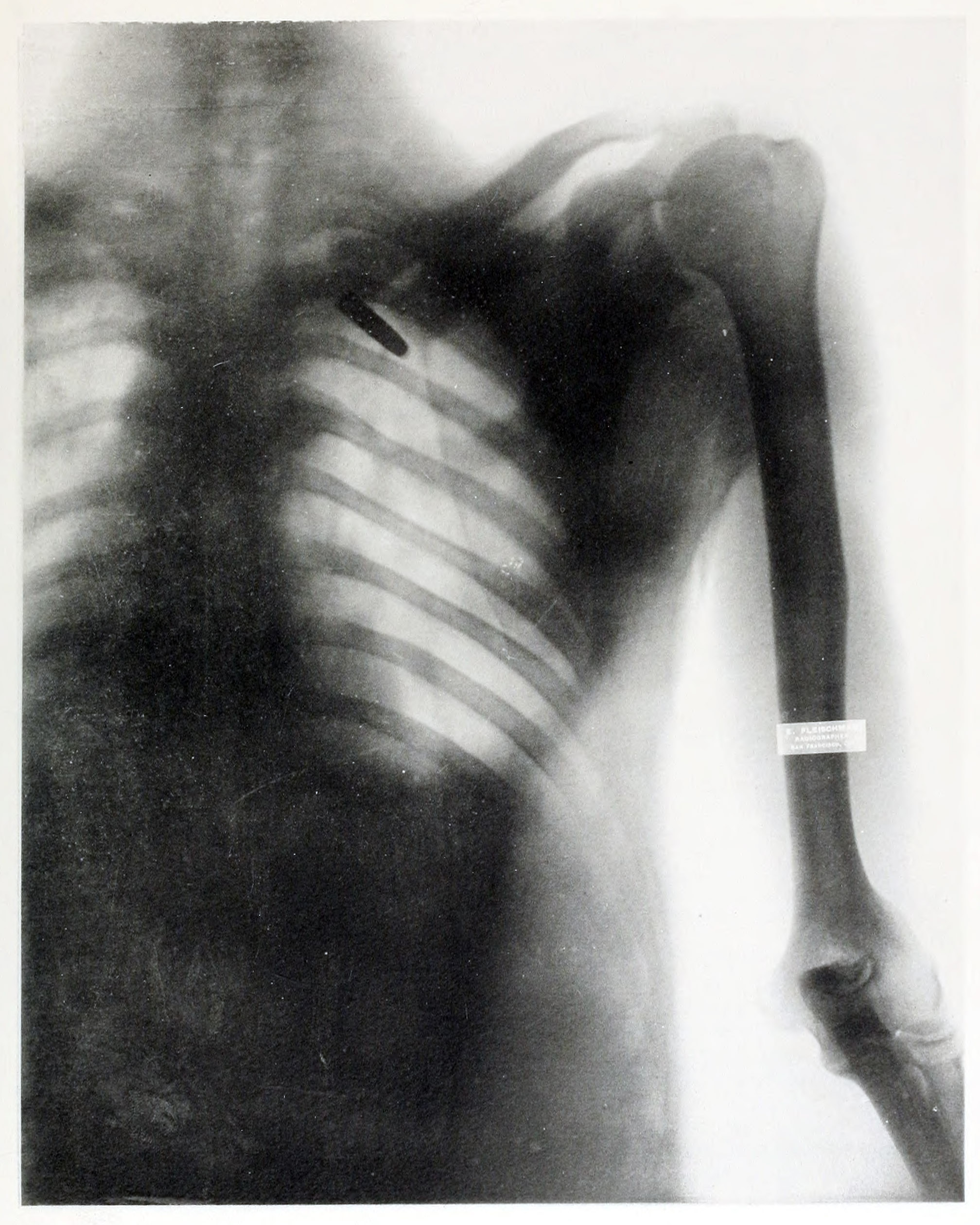
Radiograph by Elizabeth Fleischman of the chest of Private James Edwards, showing a bullet lodged near the spine.

In March 1900, Fleischman became an inaugural member of the Roentgen Society of the United States, which later became the American Roentgen Ray Society. She was one of the few members of the society who were not physicians. In that same year, the American X-ray Journal described her work and accomplishments:

"The high grade work of this lady radiographer deserves public commendation for her painstaking and tireless energy to promote X-ray science. The excellence of her work has been mentioned through the lay press but especially commented upon by medical and scientific journals. ... If Miss Fleischman is a fair criterion of what other women may do in radiography it will be well for us that the infection should spread."

== Radiation effects and death ==
At the time Fleischman worked as a radiographer, not only were X-ray tubes unshielded, it was common for operators to place their own hands in front of their fluoroscope to check exposures. In addition, Fleischman would often expose herself to X-rays to show patients that the procedure was painless.

By 1903, the cumulative effects of seven years of unprotected X-ray exposures and twelve-hour workdays began to appear as X-ray dermatitis on her hands. She attributed this irritation to the chemicals used in developing photographic plates. In early 1904, the dermatitis progressed to the point where she sought medical attention. Her doctors found:

"The fingers of both hands were found to be badly ulcerated, chiefly the tissues over the middle phalanges and the middle joints....the surfaces presenting both an ulcerated and warty condition, the warts assuming the form of necrogenica-healing alternating with ulceration. All the secreting glands and hair-follicles were destroyed so that the skin was hard and dry and cracked easily. All forms of treatment by ointments and washes were without permanent benefit."

She continued to work despite this injury. In 1904, she was responsible for introducing protective measures for the operators of X-ray machines. She commented on the merits of double-plate glass screens, and metals such as lead, aluminium, iron and copper to "resist" X-rays. By late 1904, the dermatitis progressed to cancer. Her doctors attempted to excise a tumor on her right hand, but this failed to halt the progression of the carcinoma. In January 1905 her entire right arm and scapula with the clavicle were amputated. The March 4, 1905 edition of the journal Electrical World and Engineer published the details regarding the amputation of Fleishman's right arm and her withdrawal from the field of radiography and stated:

"The leading medical and scientific men of the Coast are full of sympathy and regrets that Mrs. Aschheim has been forced to give up her eminent work as a radiographer in the midst of a brilliant career. It will be a serious loss to them to be deprived of her professional services in the most difficult cases for X-ray examination and radiography."

Four months later the cancer recurred and metastases were found in her pulmonary pleurae and lungs. Elizabeth Fleischman died on August 3, 1905, at 38 years old. The notice of her death published in the San Francisco Examiner and the San Francisco Chronicle noted:

"[S]o intent was she in the performance of her work that she became careless of her own health. She acquired the reputation [as] the most expert woman radiographer of the world, but she sacrificed her arm [to radiation poisoning] in the pursuit of that fame. The arm was amputated last January. She never fully recovered her health, though she endured all suffering with heroic fortitude. Death came as a relief..."

Her gravestone states simply: "I believe that I have done some good in this world."

Fleischman was the second person and first woman to die as result of X-ray exposure. The previous year, Clarence Dally, an American glassblower and assistant to Thomas Edison in his work on X-rays, died under similar circumstances to Fleischman.

== Personal life ==
In 1900, at age 32, Fleischman married Israel Julius Aschheim. She hyphenated her last name to Fleischmann-Aschheim. Aschheim was born in Prussia and had immigrated to California by 1868. He was the grand secretary of the Independent Order of B'nai B'rith (District No. 4, Pacific Coast), a Jewish service organization, and served as the assistant secretary to the California Board of Education.

== Publications and citations ==
- Fleischman, Elizabeth. (1898). Description of Plates: Plate LV: American Frog. Archives of the Roentgen Ray. 3(2): 62.
- Borden, William Cline, & Sternberg, George Miller. (1900). The Use of the Röntgen Ray by the Medical Department of the United States Army in the War with Spain. Washington, D.C. Government Printing Office.
- Senn, Nicholas. (1900). The X-ray in Military Surgery. Philadelphia Medical Journal. 5: 36–37.
