= Girls High School (San Francisco) =

Former school in California

- San Francisco, California

Information
- Established: 1865
- Closed: 1952

Girls High School in San Francisco, California, was established in 1865 and was discontinued in 1952.

A tableau vivant was given on May 29, 1897, in the Girls High auditorium by Union Army veterans, at right, who sang Tenting on the Old Camp Ground.

Graduation party, June 6, 1900

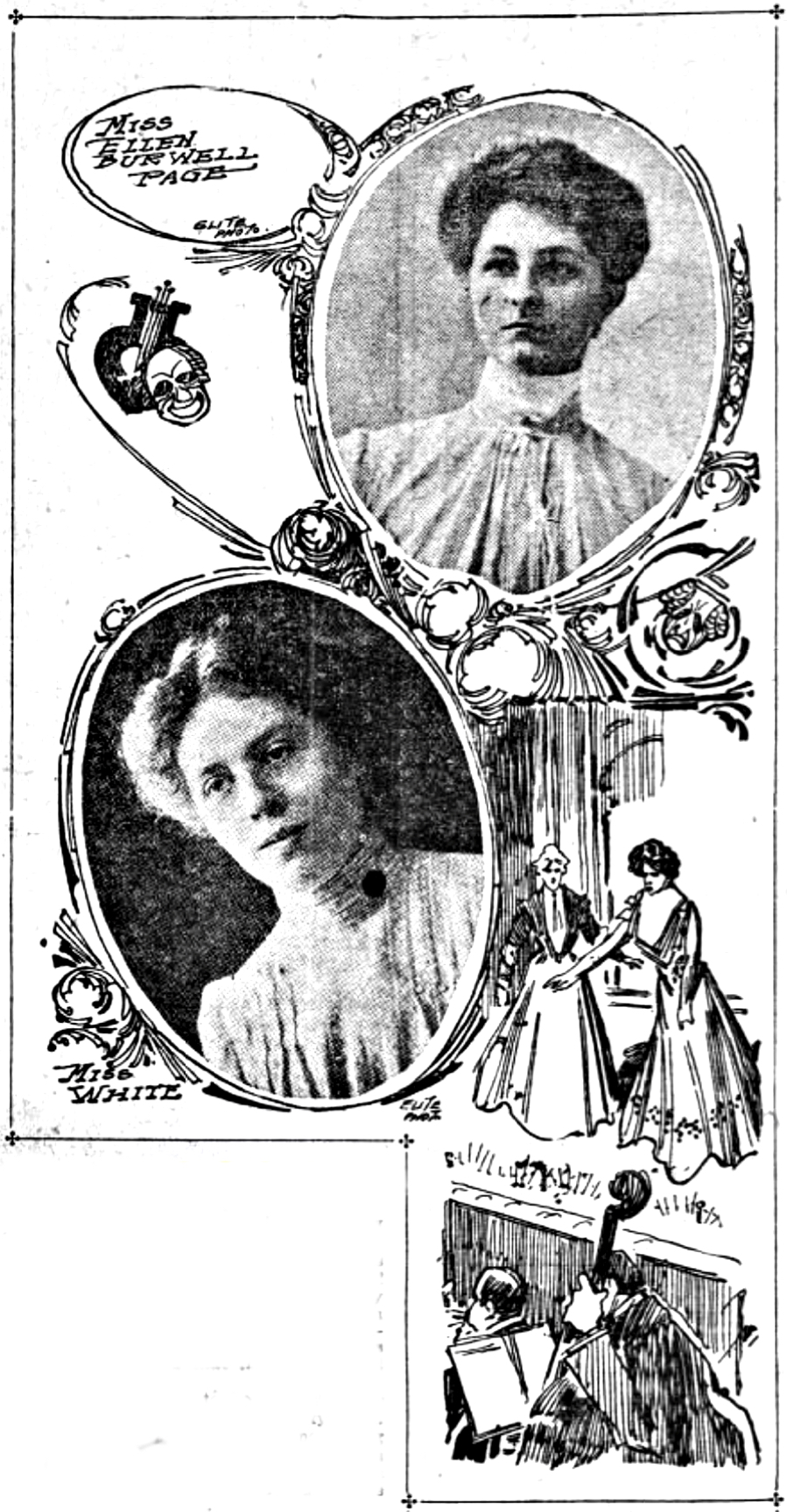
Publicity illustration for a stage play, The Chaperon, by Rachel Baker, presented by Girls High students in April 1902

Fire destroyed a building surrounded by scaffolding on August 19, 1934.

== Founding ==
The city's Board of Education declared on July 25, 1865, that the existing Rincon School would thenceforth be an "all-girls school". It had ninety seats assigned to it.

On September 18, 1868, the Board of Education authorized the expenditure of $25,000 to erect a Girls High School on the southeast corner of Stockton and Bush streets, where the existing building stood.

In 1869, the expense of educating one student in the Boys High School, later renamed Lowell High School, was $116.64 and one student in Girls High was $68.64.

== Faculty ==
In 1889, "Eighty or more" students signed a petition on behalf of teacher Jessie Smith, who had been singled out for dismissal, ostensibly by a new vice principal who wanted to hire a teacher from the Eastern United States. Others, however, said that the proposed dismissal was occasioned by a rumor that Smith had Negro ancestry. She and her brothers denied that was the case, her ancestry being "three-fourths English and one-fourth Irish." In 1891 Smith was president of the San Francisco Teachers Mutual Aid Association.

== Campus ==
In 1892, a new building was completed at Geary and Scott streets. A grand jury indicted the contractor, J.P. McCormick, and others for collusion to defraud the county treasury.

The school auditorium, ten classrooms, and locker rooms were destroyed by fire that swept through the O'Farrell Street wing at Scott Street the morning of August 19, 1934. Eleven firemen were injured, some of them trapped under a falling ceiling. The fire was blamed on sparks from a worker's blowtorch during work on the building, which was surrounded by scaffolding.

== Discipline ==
In 1988, a group of graduates recalled that gum chewing was forbidden in the 1920s. "So was Charleston dancing in the hallways, smoking in the toilets and sneaking downtown for chocolate sundaes."

== Closure ==
The last term ended in spring 1952, and the campus became Benjamin Franklin Junior High School. At that time the school was in an area considered to be blighted.

== List of principals ==
- E.H. Holmes, 1865
- George W. Minns, 1880–1888
- John Swett, resigned July 1889. The School Board was dissatisfied with his administration because he had taken no steps toward the school's accreditation by the University of California and because no women had been sent to the university since 1884.
- Mary W. Kincaid, 1889–1892. She made the instruction identical with that in the Boys High School, and graduates were enabled to enter the University of California simply with their diplomas.
- Elisha Brooks, 1892–1904. During his term, Girls High became the only school west of the Rockies accredited by Vassar College. Brooks was investigated by the school board with "gross mismanagement" in that he spent his time as a farmer in the school garden instead of attending to his duties. He was also accused of mishandling a personnel matter involving the relationship between two teachers, a male and a female.
- Arthur W. Scott, 1904-1920s

== Notable alumni ==
- Elizabeth Fleischmann, X-ray pioneer
- Pauline Kael, film critic and writer
- Florence Prag Kahn, teacher and Congress member
