= Forester (schooner) =

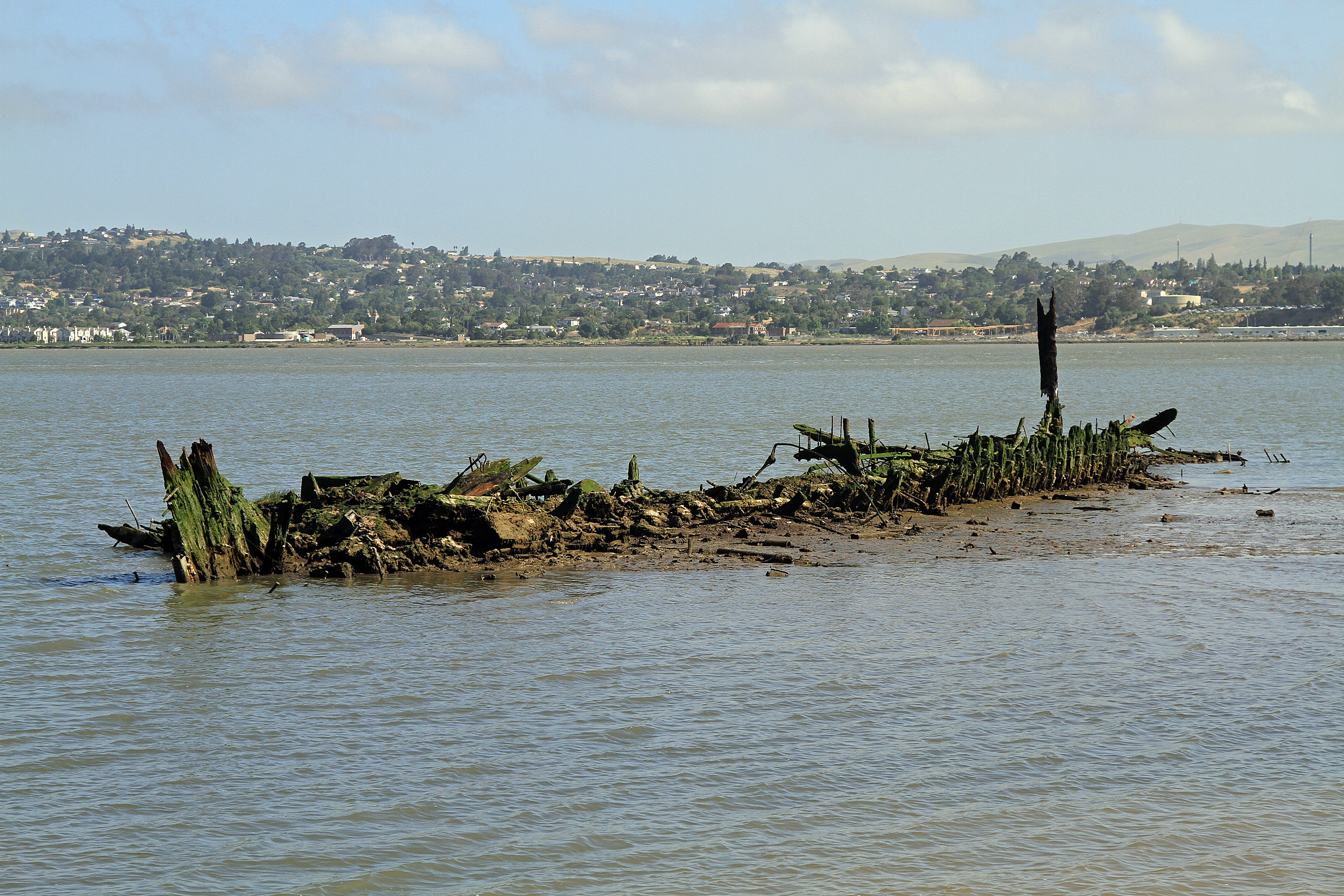
- The remains of the charred hull of the Forester at the Radke Martinez Regional Shoreline.

History

United States
- Owner: Otto Daeweritz
- Builder: Otto Daeweritz, Alameda, California
- Launched: 1900
- Fate: Burned 1975

General characteristics
- Type: Schooner

The Forester was a schooner vessel constructed in Alameda in November 1900. The construction was overseen by Captain Otto Daeweritz who served as the only captain of the vessel during the Forester's 75-year history. Although starting off as a cargo ship delivering lumber and other cargo throughout the Pacific Coast, the Forester was also famous for making trips to China, India, and Australia. By 1935 the Forester was retired from its trips on the Pacific and was settled into the mud flats of Martinez, California, in the Carquinez Strait, where it sat to rot until burning down in 1975. All that remains today is the ship's charred hull, which can be seen from the Radke Martinez Regional Shoreline.

The Forester is most famous for sailing from San Francisco to Australia in a mere seventy-five days setting a record. Before it burnt to the ground, the Forester was the last intact Schooner still in use on the Pacific Coast.
