= John Swett High School =

Coordinates: 38°03′10″N 122°13′18″W

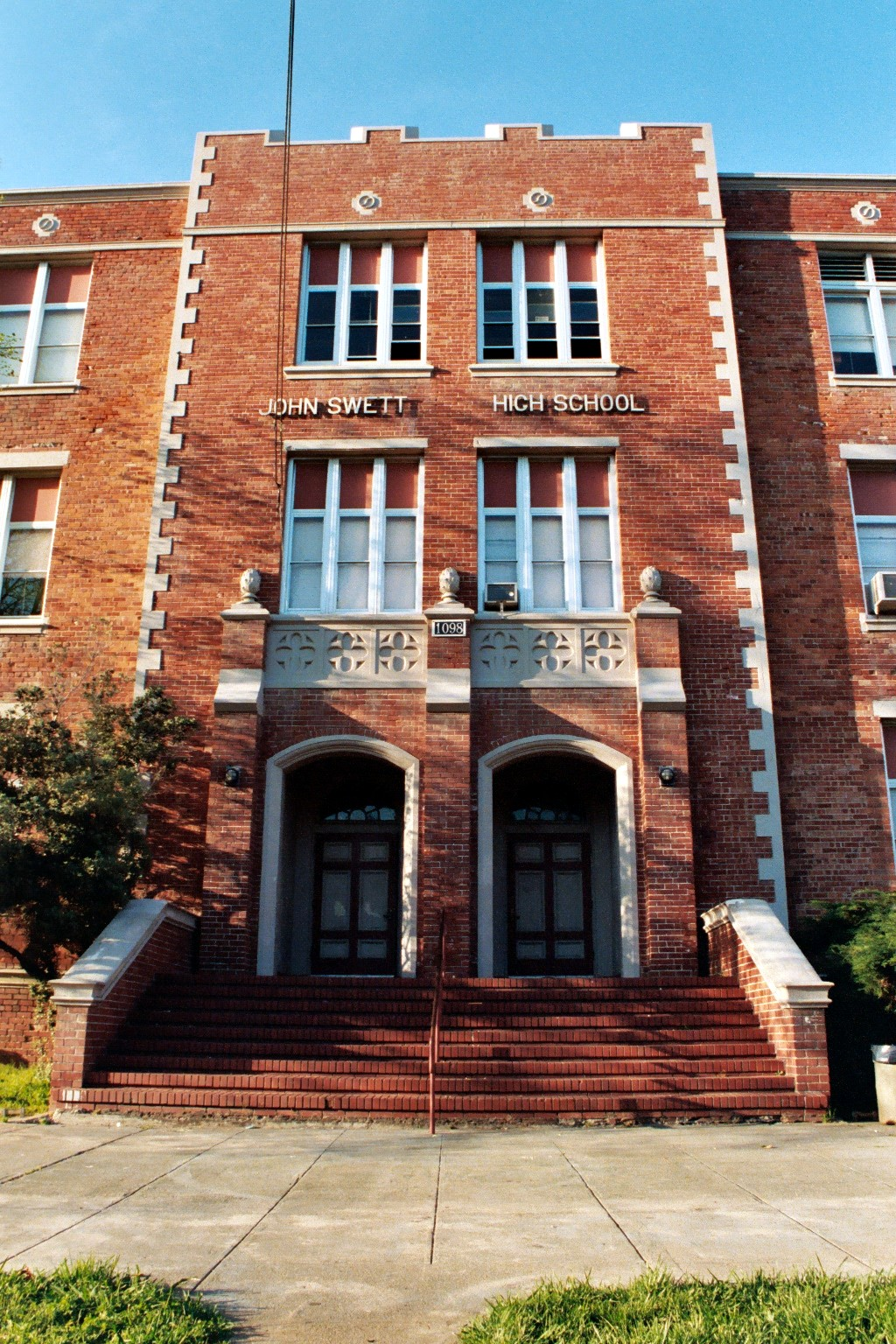

Location
- 1098 Pomona St; Crockett, California, United States

Information
- Type: Public secondary
- Established: 1927
- School district: John Swett Unified
- Principal: Athena Kautsch
- Staff: 18.94 (FTE)
- Grades: 9-12
- Student to teacher ratio: 18.53
- Colors: Scarlet, white, and royal blue
- Athletics: Football, basketball, softball, baseball, volleyball, soccer, cross-country, wrestling, cheerleading
- Mascot: Warrior
- Website: Home page

John Swett High School is located in Crockett, California, United States. It serves the communities of Crockett, Port Costa, Rodeo, and the Foxboro area of Hercules. It is named after John Swett, former California Superintendent of Public Instruction, elected in 1863. John Swett High School was established in 1927. The school remains in its original building complex, which was extensively renovated five years after original construction for seismic retrofitting at a cost of two-thirds of the original cost of the complex. John Swett High School is part of the John Swett Unified School District.

The school's Indian mascot was dropped by a vote of the School District Board in February 2015. Citing the Golden State Warriors as an example, the school mascot became the Warriors in February 2016. The school always was the Warriors but would go by Indians. The year books would say Warriors on the cover but sports teams would go by the Indians.

== Notable alumni ==
- Billie Joe Armstrong - musician, of the punk rock band Green Day (transferred after freshman year)
- Eric the Midget (Eric Lynch) - television actor and recurring personality on the Howard Stern Show
- Floyd Peters - professional football player
- Aldo Ray - film actor
- John V. Robinson - writer and photographer; author of books Crockett, and Spanning the Strait: Building the Alfred Zampa Memorial Bridge
- Jim Turner - professional football player (1959)
