= Crockett Hills Regional Park =

Park in California, United States

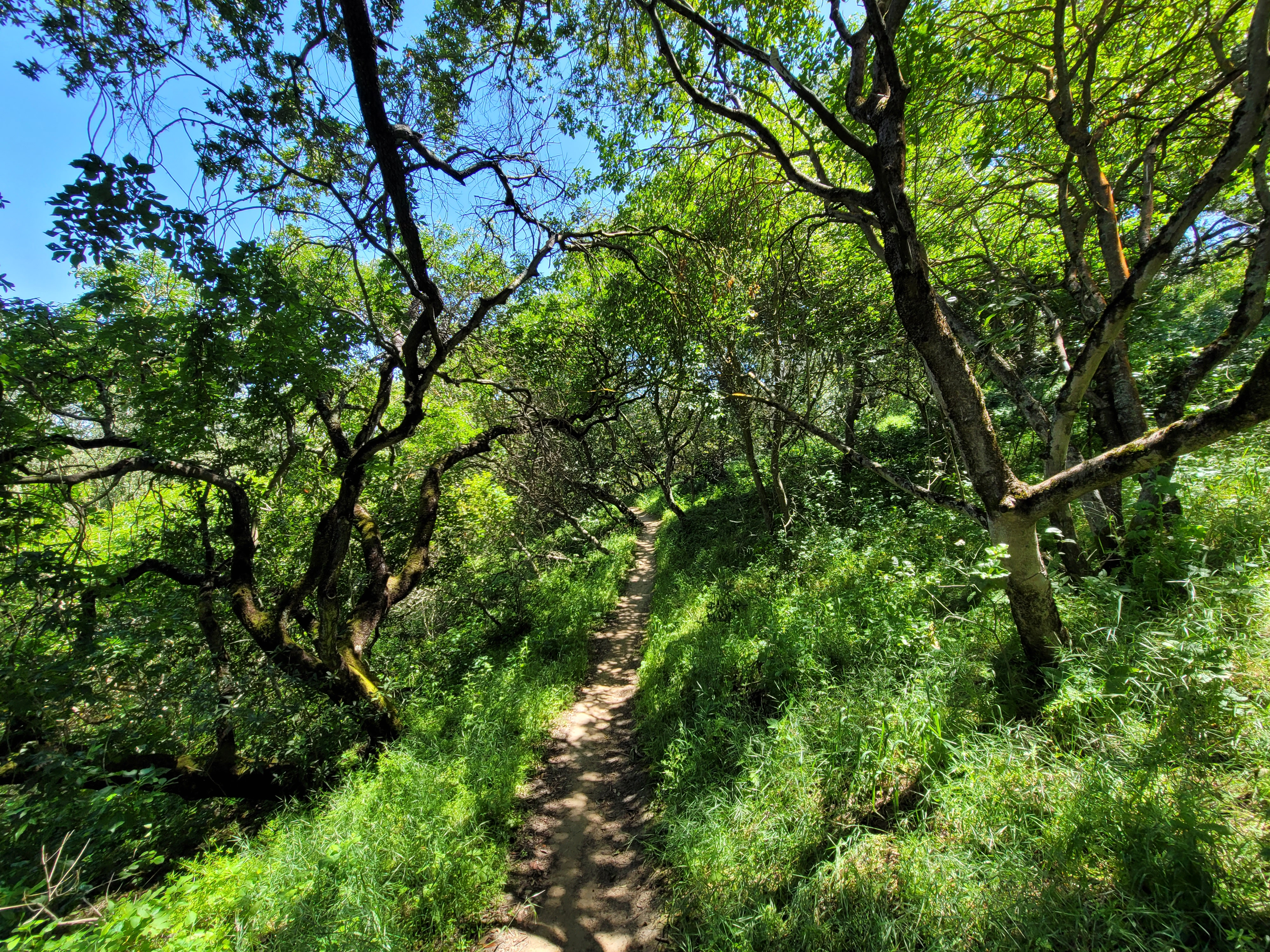
- A view from a trail in the park in May 2023
- Type: Regional park
- Location: Contra Costa County
- Nearest city: Crockett, California
- Area: 1,939 acres (7.85 km^{2})
- Created: 2006
- Operator: East Bay Regional Park District

Crockett Hills Regional Park is a regional park in Contra Costa County, California, just south of Crockett. opened to the public in 2006. Part of the East Bay Regional Park District, it consists of 1,939 acres (7.85 km^{2}) of rolling grasslands, wooded ravines and shoreline along the south bank of the Carquinez Strait. Its elevation ranges from 100 feet (30 m) to 800 feet (240 m) above sea level. The higher elevations offer good views of San Pablo Bay, the Sacramento - San Joaquin Delta, Mount Tamalpais, and Mount Diablo.

The portion of park area west of Cummings Skyway from its junction with Crockett Boulevard to the southeastern boundary of the park, and from the junction along Crockett Boulevard to the Crockett Ranch Staging Area in the northwestern corner of the park is open to public use. The remainder of the park area is in Land Bank status, and is closed to the public at all times. The southern boundary of the park reaches nearly to California Highway 4, although there is no entrance to the park from that road. The park contains a segment of the Bay Area Ridge Trail. Goldfinch and Kestrel trails are subject to seasonal closure when eagles are nesting. Cattle grazing is used to manage fuel load in the areas south of Cummings Skyway and the areas in land bank.

== Activities ==
Popular activities include hiking, running, biking, dog walking and horseback riding. Picnicking is also popular, Tables are available in the park, but they are not reservable (first come, first served). There are no campgrounds.

There is a mountain biking loop including narrow multi-use trails with some sections of trail purpose-built for mountain biking including Sugar City, Tree Frog, and Warep trails.

Dogs are welcome. They must be on leash in parking lots and staging areas. Dogs may be off leash elsewhere in the park, provided they are under voice control.
