= John Swett Unified School District =

School district in California, United States

The John Swett Unified School District (JSUSD) is a public school district in Contra Costa County, California. It currently operates one elementary school, one middle school, and one standard high school and another for Continuing and Alternative education. The current district superintendent is Charles Miller.

The district includes Crockett, Port Costa, Rodeo, and a section of Hercules.

== Schools ==
- Rodeo Hills Elementary School, Rodeo, Calif. - Grades K-5
- Carquinez Middle School, Crockett, Calif. - Grades 6-8
- John Swett High School, Crockett, Calif. - Grades 9-12
- Willow High School, Crockett, Calif. - Continuation and Alternative Education

=== Closed ===
- Port Costa School
