= Port Costa, California =

Port Costa
- Unincorporated Community; Census Designated Place
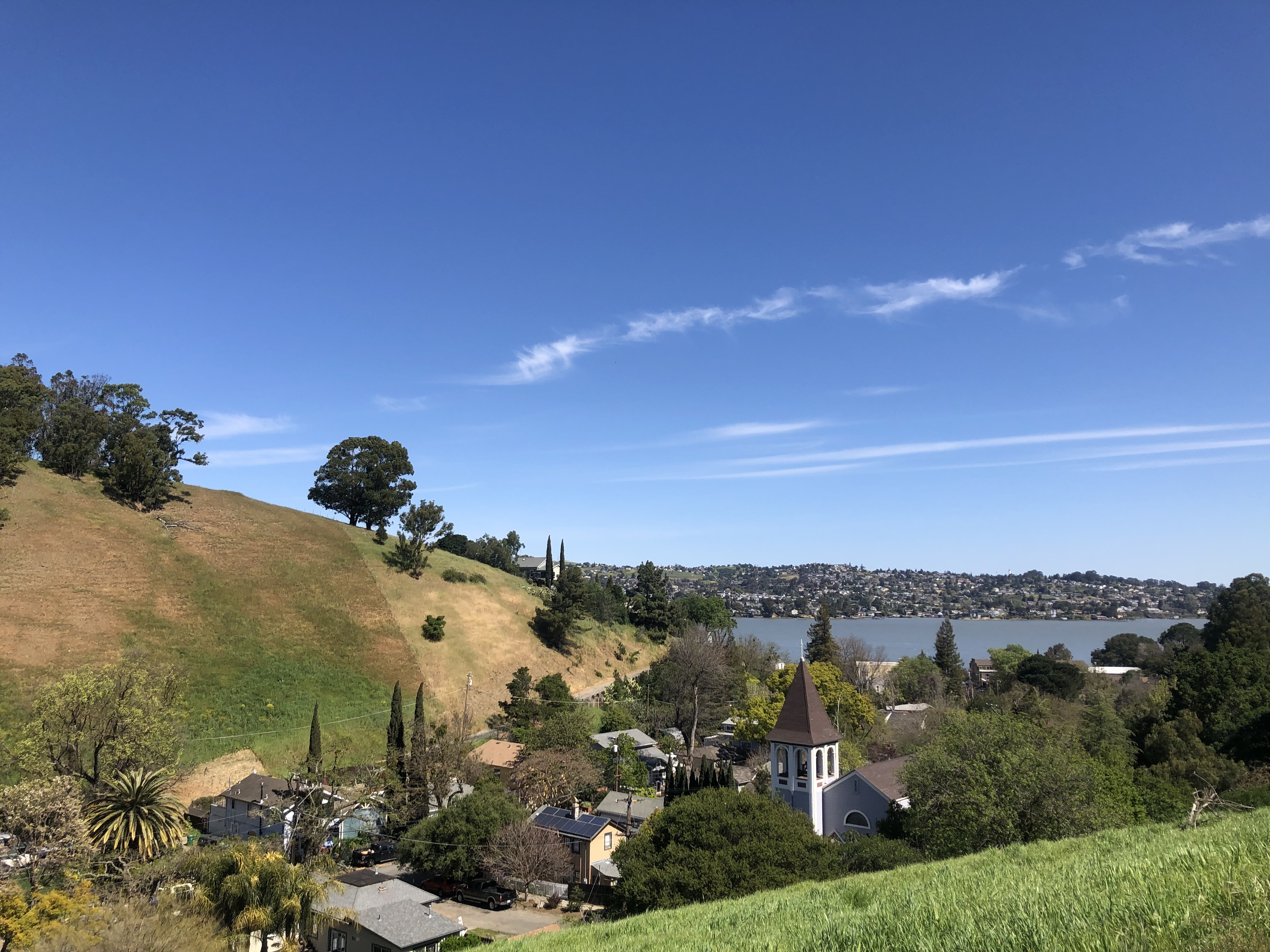
- Port Costa

- Location in Contra Costa County and the state of California

- Location in the United States
- Coordinates: 38°02′47″N 122°11′00″W
- Country: United States
- State: California
- County: Contra Costa

Government
  - County Board: District V: Shanelle Scales-Preston
  - State Senate: Tim Grayson (D)
  - State Assembly: Anamarie Avila Farias (D)
  - U. S. Congress: John Garamendi (D)

Area
  - Total: 0.158 sq mi (0.41 km^{2})
  - Land: 0.158 sq mi (0.41 km^{2})
  - Water: 0 sq mi (0 km^{2}) 0%
- Elevation: 16 ft (4.9 m)

Population (2020)
  - Total: 190
  - Density: 1,200/sq mi (460/km^{2})
- Time zone: UTC-8 (PST)
  - Summer (DST): UTC-7 (PDT)
- ZIP code: 94569
- Area code: 510, 341
- FIPS code: 06-58226
- GNIS feature IDs: 230948, 2409091

Port Costa is a small town and census-designated place (CDP) in Contra Costa County, California, United States, located in the East Bay region of the San Francisco Bay Area. Situated on the southern shore of the Carquinez Strait, the population was 190 in 2020 according to the United States Census Bureau.

== History ==
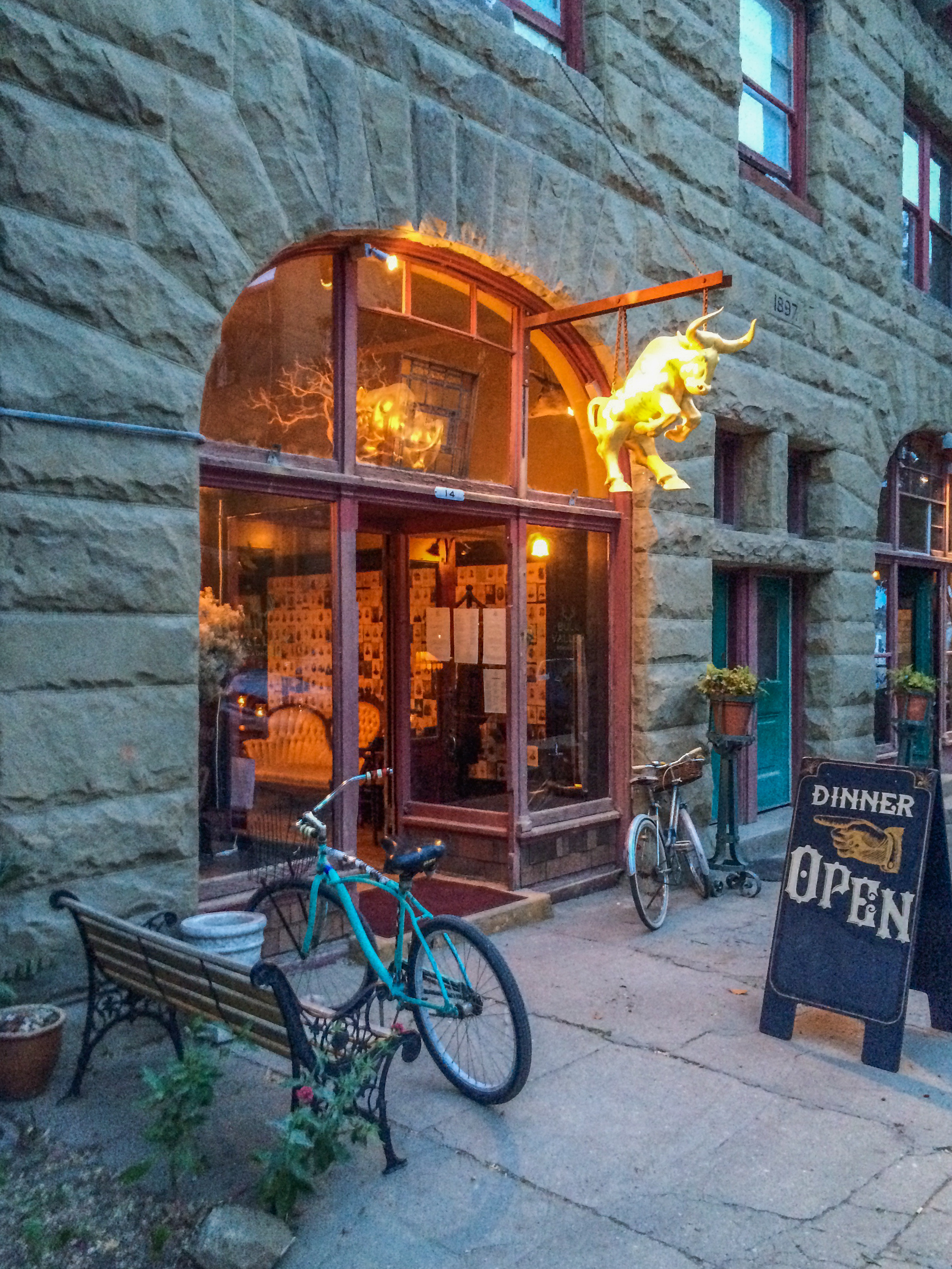
Bull Valley Roadhouse, formerly the McNear office building, built 1897

Port Costa was founded in 1879 as a landing for the railroad ferry Solano, owned and operated by the Central Pacific Railroad. This put Port Costa on the main route of the transcontinental railroad. The Solano, later joined by the Contra Costa, carried entire trains across the Carquinez Strait from Benicia to Port Costa, from where they continued on to the Oakland Pier.

Businessman George W. McNear built the Port Costa Warehouses and Dock Company west of the new ferry terminal in 1880. The valley where Port Costa now sits, at one point called Bull Valley, was part of a ranch owned by William Piper. In 1883, McNear bought Piper's land for $100,000 and began to build up the town. Port Costa became the busiest port on the West Coast, primarily shipping wheat.

Port Costa's first post office was established in 1881 with postmaster Kate Hurley. It later moved to a warehouse built by McNear, where it remains today. The Port Costa School, a classical revival building designed by architect William Wilde, was built in 1911, opened in 1912, and operated until 1966. In 1988, it was added to the National Register of Historic Places. St. Patrick Church was founded in 1884, rebuilt in 1898, and restored in 1980.

For the early decades of Port Costa's existence, much of the town's commercial activities took place on wharves and docks along the waterfront. These wharves and docks suffered from numerous fires between 1883 and 1941, and a large part of the "Waterfront Port Costa" area was demolished in 1921 after being badly damaged by shipworms. No docks or wharves are left standing today, although pilings remain.

Besides the railroad and shipping, another important industry in Port Costa was brick making. Port Costa Brick Works operated from 1905 until 1991.

After California's wheat output dropped in the early 20th century and especially after the Southern Pacific (which took over the operations of the Central Pacific) constructed a railroad bridge at Martinez in 1930 to replace the ferry crossing, Port Costa lost population and importance.

In 1963, Bill Rich purchased and renovated multiple Port Costa buildings, including the Burlington Hotel (built circa 1883) and McNear's warehouse (built 1886), with the goal of making the town a tourist attraction. Under this iteration, the warehouse housed multiple antique stores and, for two years, artist Clayton Bailey's Wonders of the World Museum. However, Port Costa fell into decline after a 1983 fire in the hills between Port Costa and Crockett.

In 1999, known biker bar the Warehouse Cafe, located in the warehouse originally built by McNear, was purchased by a new owner and gained a "cult following" over the decades. In 2012, the restaurant Bull Valley Roadhouse, which sits in McNear's old office building, was renovated. In the following year, the Burlington Hotel was renovated by new owners as well. Port Costa continues to be a destination for day or weekend trips.

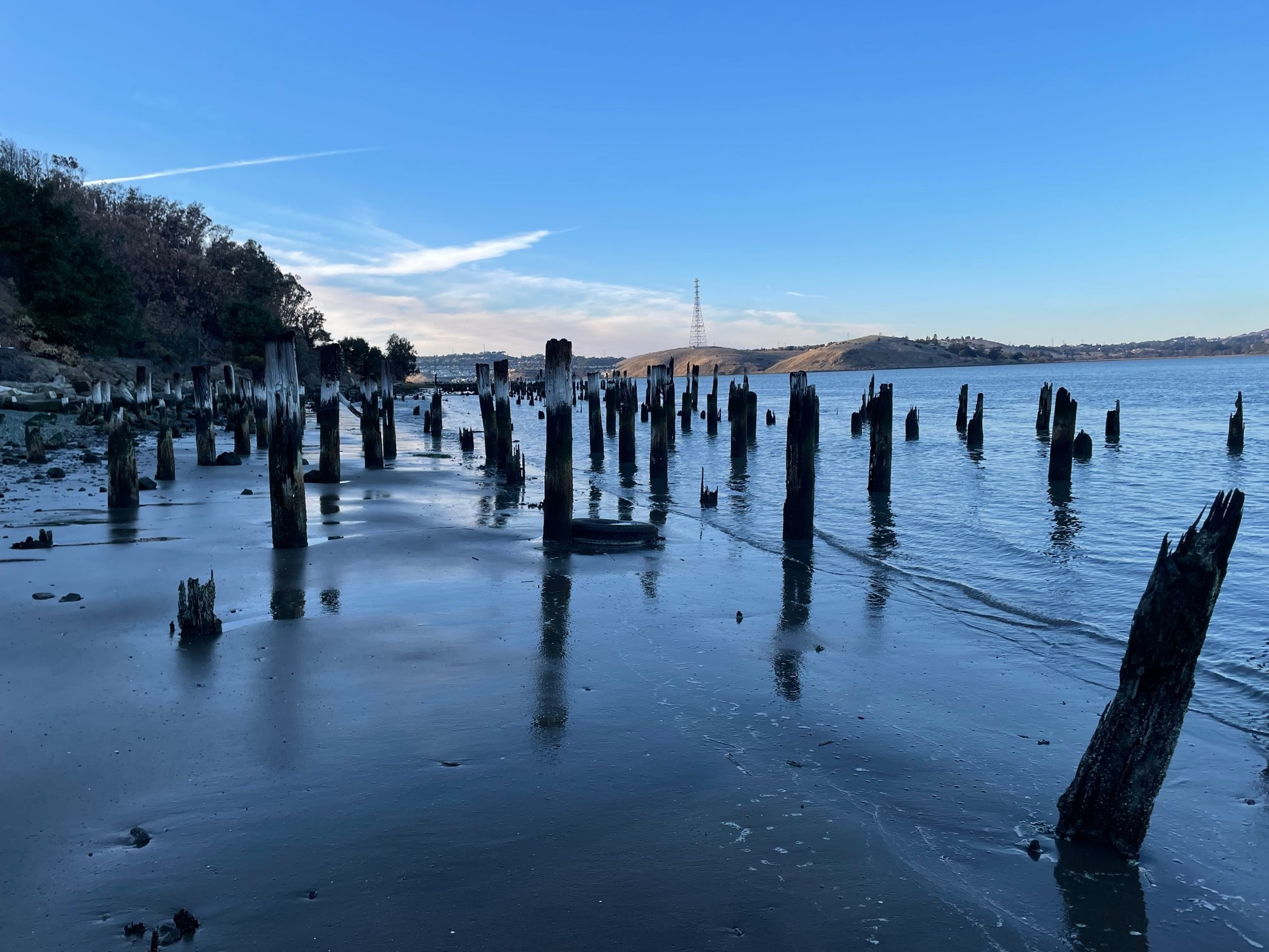
Pilings left over from the docks at Port Costa

== Geography ==
According to the United States Census Bureau, the CDP has a total area of 0.16 square miles (0.41 km^{2}), all land. Port Costa is surrounded by rolling hills grazed by cattle and is managed by East Bay Regional Park District. Carquinez Strait Regional Shoreline stretches from Crockett through Port Costa and to Martinez. Big Bull Valley Creek runs along McEwen Road into a historic reservoir just above the town, then it runs in an underground pipe culvert beneath the town to the Carquinez Strait.

At the 2000 census, the CDP had a total area of 0.68 square miles (1.8 km^{2}), all land.

== Demographics ==
Historical population
Census	Pop.	Note	%±
2000	232		—
2010	190		−18.1%
2020	190		0.0%
U.S. Decennial Census; 1860–1870 1880-1890; 1900 1910 1920; 1930 1940 1950; 1960 1970 1980; 1990 2000 2010

Port Costa first appeared as a census designated place in the 2000 U.S. census.

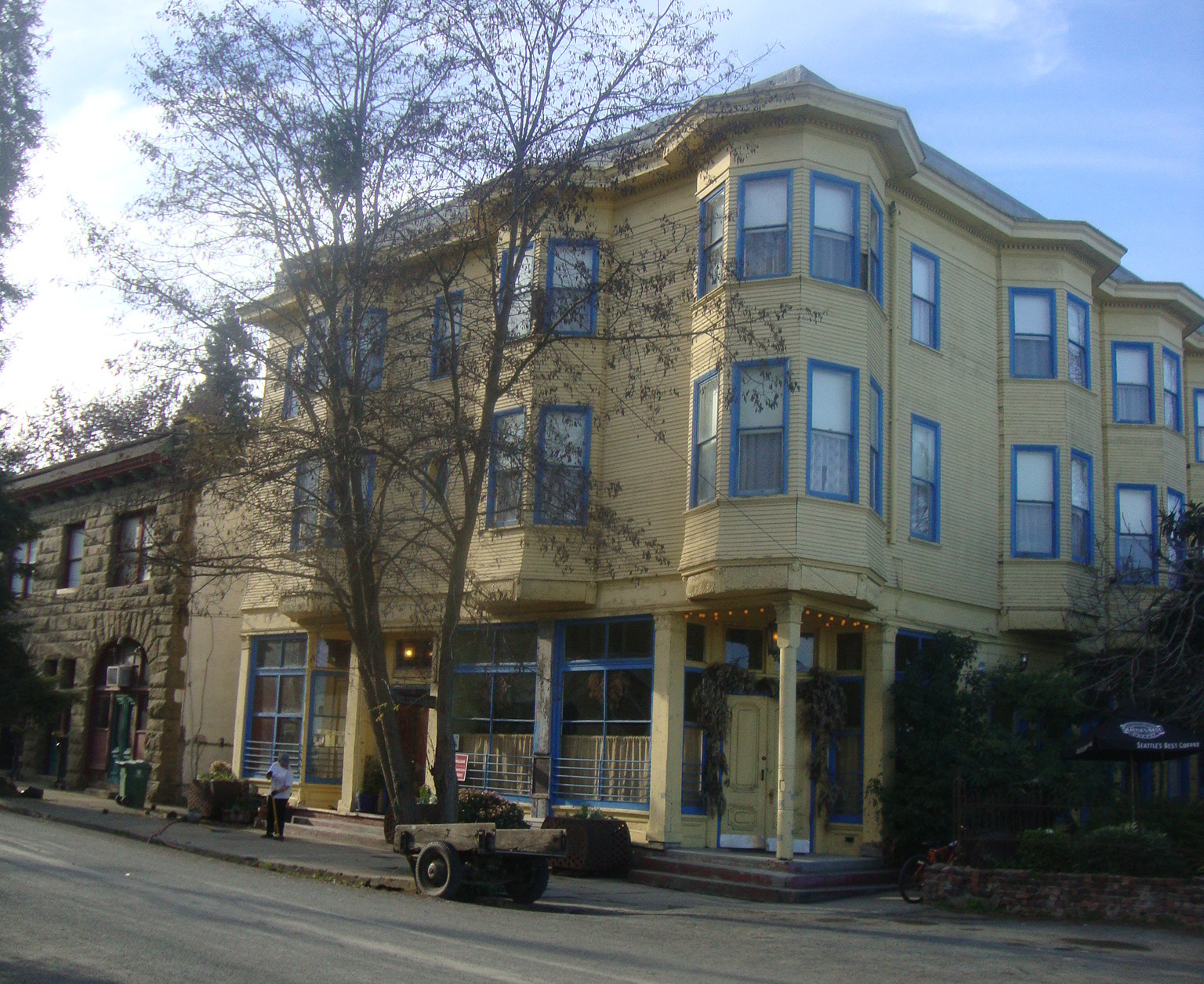
Historic buildings in Port Costa.

=== 2020 ===
Port Costa CDP, California – Racial and ethnic composition Note: the US Census treats Hispanic/Latino as an ethnic category. This table excludes Latinos from the racial categories and assigns them to a separate category. Hispanics/Latinos may be of any race.
Race / Ethnicity (NH = Non-Hispanic)	Pop 2000	Pop 2010	Pop 2020	% 2000	% 2010	% 2020
White alone (NH)	202	162	146	87.07%	85.26%	76.84%
Black or African American alone (NH)	0	2	0	0.00%	1.05%	0.00%
Native American or Alaska Native alone (NH)	3	2	2	1.29%	1.05%	1.05%
Asian alone (NH)	3	7	5	1.29%	3.68%	2.63%
Native Hawaiian or Pacific Islander alone (NH)	0	0	0	0.00%	0.00%	0.00%
Other race alone (NH)	0	0	0	0.00%	0.00%	0.00%
Mixed race or Multiracial (NH)	8	7	19	3.45%	3.68%	10.00%
Hispanic or Latino (any race)	16	10	18	6.90%	5.26%	9.47%
Total	232	190	190	100.00%	100.00%	100.00%

The 2020 United States census reported that Port Costa had a population of 190. The population density was 1,202.5 inhabitants per square mile (464.3/km^{2}). The racial makeup of Port Costa was 81.1% White, 0.0% African American, 1.1% Native American, 2.6% Asian, 0.0% Pacific Islander, 1.1% from other races, and 14.2% from two or more races. Hispanic or Latino of any race were 9.5% of the population.

The census reported that 100% of the population lived in households.

There were 104 households, out of which 9.6% included children under the age of 18, 33.7% were married-couple households, 6.7% were cohabiting couple households, 36.5% had a female householder with no partner present, and 23.1% had a male householder with no partner present. 43.3% of households were one person, and 25.0% were one person aged 65 or older. The average household size was 1.83. There were 50 families (48.1% of all households).

The age distribution was 9.5% under the age of 18, 6.3% aged 18 to 24, 21.6% aged 25 to 44, 37.9% aged 45 to 64, and 24.7% who were 65 years of age or older. The median age was 50.5 years. For every 100 females, there were 91.9 males.

There were 106 housing units at an average density of 670.9 units per square mile (259.0 units/km^{2}), of which 104 (98.1%) were occupied. Of these, 50.0% were owner-occupied, and 50.0% were occupied by renters.

== Education ==
Port Costa is in the John Swett Unified School District. It previously operated Port Costa School.

== Notable people from Port Costa ==
- Clayton Bailey and Betty Graveen Bailey, artists
- Roy De Forest, artist
