= Crockett, California =

Crockett
- Census-designated place
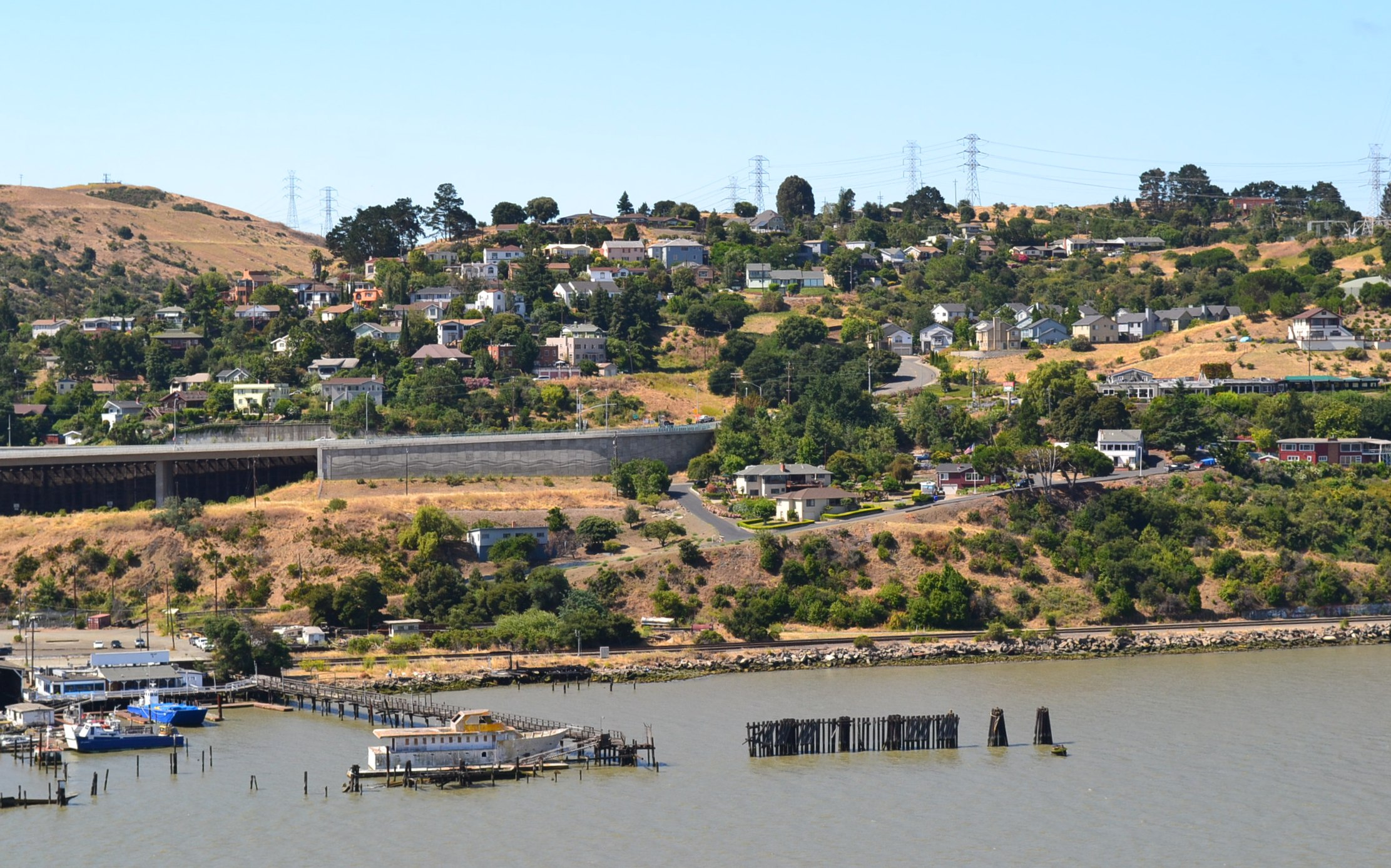
- Looking south towards Crockett from the Carquinez Strait, July 14, 2010. Courtesy Federico Pizano.

- Location in Contra Costa County and California

- Location in the United States
- Coordinates: 38°03′09″N 122°12′47″W
- Country: United States
- State: California
- County: Contra Costa

Government
  - State Senate: Tim Grayson (D)
  - State Assembly: Anamarie Avila Farias (D)
  - U. S. Congress: John Garamendi (D)

Area
  - Total: 1.06 sq mi (2.75 km^{2})
  - Land: 1.06 sq mi (2.75 km^{2})
  - Water: 0 sq mi (0.00 km^{2}) 0%
- Elevation: 128 ft (39 m)

Population (2020)
  - Total: 3,242
  - Density: 3,052.0/sq mi (1,178.38/km^{2})
- Time zone: UTC-8 (PST)
  - Summer (DST): UTC-7 (PDT)
- ZIP code: 94525
- Area codes: 510, 341
- FIPS code: 06-17274
- GNIS feature IDs: 277495, 2407683

Crockett (formerly Crockettville) is a census-designated place (CDP) in Contra Costa County, in the East Bay sub-region of the San Francisco Bay Area, California, United States. The population was 3,242 at the 2020 census. It is located 28 miles (45 km) northeast of San Francisco. Other nearby communities include Port Costa, Martinez, Vallejo, Benicia, Rodeo, Hercules, Pinole and Richmond.

== History ==
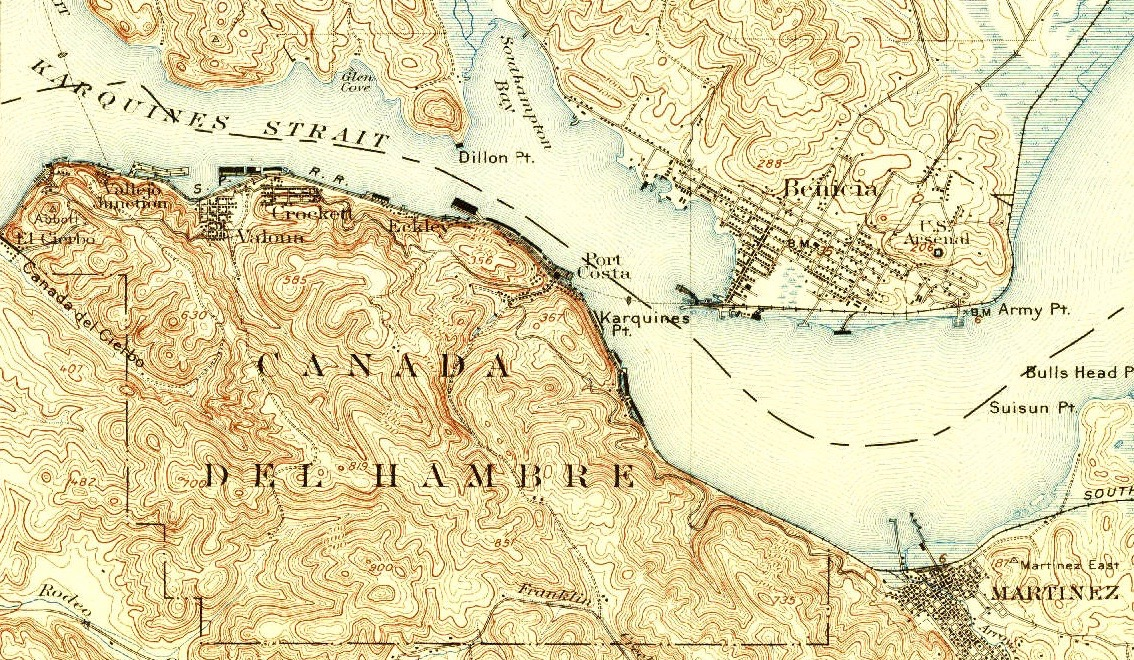
Crockett in 1898. Note earlier spelling of Karquines.

Crockett is located on the Mexican land grant Rancho El Pinole made to Ygnacio Martinez, and is named after Joseph B. Crockett, a judge on the California Supreme Court. The town started when Thomas Edwards Sr. bought 1,800 acres (730 ha) of land from Judge Crockett in 1866. Edwards built his home in 1867 and when other settlers arrived, he started the first general store in Crockett. Edwards' home still stands and is known as "The Old Homestead", a California Historical Landmark. Crocketville post office was established in 1883, and the name was changed to Crockett later that year.

=== "Sugar Town" ===
In 1906, an agricultural cooperative of Hawaiian sugar cane growers bought an existing beet sugar factory, refitted the facility, built additional structures for their refining needs, eventually turning Crockett into a company town for the California and Hawaiian Sugar Company (better known as C&H). The cane was grown in Hawaii and delivered by ship to Crockett, where the C&H refinery turned it into a variety of finished products.

C & H soon became a dominant force in Crockett, which has been called a "company town." (Note: One source wrote that Crockett was sometimes called, "Sugar Town.") By the 1920s, the company employed about 95 percent of the residents. Employment peaked at 2,500 just before WWII broke out. C & H helped its employees obtain land and bank loans so that they could build houses. Company architects worked on designing the houses. The company funded many school and civic programs.

In March and April 1938, Crockett experienced a labor strike at the C&H plant, climaxing in a riot. This was prior to the merger of the AFL and CIO national unions.

=== Economic adaptation ===
By the 1960s, the good times were largely over for C & H and Crockett. Revenues and profits began dropping, so that the company pumped less money into the community. There were many layoffs as the company tried to restore profitability. In 1984, the company proposed building a natural gas-powered cogeneration plant that would provide steam for the sugar refinery and low-cost electricity for Crockett. A protest group calling itself the Crockett Power Plant Committee, supported by many Crockett residents, was formed and spent the next nine years opposing the proposal. The proposed power plant was eventually built, but only after the company agreed to make major changes. C & H agreed to give Crockett $300,000 per year for the ensuing 30 years, which mostly funds its police and volunteer fire fighting departments.

The Hawaiian sugar farmers sold their holdings in 1993 to Hawaii-based Alexander & Baldwin, which converted C & H from a co-op into a corporation. In 1998, A & B sold a controlling interest to Citicorp Venture Capital (CVC). American Sugar Refining bought C & H in 2006, merging it with its other sugar operations. Revenues and profits continued their decline into the 21st century, until the Crockett plant processed its last shipment of Hawaiian sugar in 2017. (Note: The last sugar mill on Maui closed in December 2016. Its final product, 30,000 pounds (14 t) was delivered to Crockett aboard the ship Moku Pahu on January 17, 2017.)

Raw sugar now arrives from the globe's sun belt: Australia, the Philippines and Nicaragua, among other countries.

=== Wildfire (2019) ===
A wildfire burned near Crockett on October 29, 2019, the same week as multiple wildfires in the region, e.g. Sonoma County's Kirkwood Fire, and a wildfire at the north end of the Carquinez Bridge in Vallejo, California. There is some suspicion that strong northerly wind then caused embers from the Vallejo fire to jump the strait and ignite brush fires southwest of Crockett, located in Contra Costa County at the opposite end of the Carquinez Bridge. The new fire, which was dubbed the Sky Fire, ignited about 9:30 AM and quickly generated so much dense smoke that authorities chose to close the Carquinez Bridge to all vehicular traffic in both directions. The CHP and county sheriff's office then began to evacuate residents from that side of the community. Emergency responders from other cities rushed to the aid of Crockett's own volunteer fire department to begin extinguishing the fire, which was reportedly 50 percent contained shortly after noon that day. The Crockett evacuation order was cancelled and the Carquinez Bridge was reopened to traffic soon after.

== Geography ==
According to the United States Census Bureau, the CDP has a total area of 1.1 square miles (2.8 km^{2}), all land.

Crockett is located where the Carquinez Strait meets San Pablo Bay. The Carquinez Bridge, part of Interstate 80, links Crockett with the city of Vallejo to the north across the strait. To the east of Crockett along the south shore of the strait are Port Costa and the city of Martinez. South of Crockett are the town of Rodeo and the city of Hercules. Farther southwest on I-80 are the cities of Richmond, Berkeley and Oakland; in the opposite direction, northeast, is the capital of California, Sacramento.

=== Climate ===
This region experiences warm (but not hot) and dry summers, with no average monthly temperatures above 71.6 °F (22.0 °C). According to the Köppen Climate Classification system, Crockett has a warm-summer Mediterranean climate, abbreviated Csb on climate maps.

Climate data for Crockett, California
Month	Jan	Feb	Mar	Apr	May	Jun	Jul	Aug	Sep	Oct	Nov	Dec	Year
Record high °F (°C)	73 (23)	79 (26)	85 (29)	92 (33)	100 (38)	104 (40)	110 (43)	103 (39)	107 (42)	99 (37)	87 (31)	75 (24)	110 (43)
Mean daily maximum °F (°C)	54.1 (12.3)	59.6 (15.3)	63.5 (17.5)	66.8 (19.3)	71.1 (21.7)	77.0 (25.0)	80.0 (26.7)	80.3 (26.8)	78.7 (25.9)	73.3 (22.9)	64.3 (17.9)	54.9 (12.7)	68.6 (20.3)
Daily mean °F (°C)	47.4 (8.6)	51.6 (10.9)	54.6 (12.6)	57.3 (14.1)	61.0 (16.1)	65.8 (18.8)	67.6 (19.8)	67.9 (19.9)	67.1 (19.5)	62.9 (17.2)	55.7 (13.2)	48.5 (9.2)	59.0 (15.0)
Mean daily minimum °F (°C)	40.8 (4.9)	43.6 (6.4)	45.6 (7.6)	47.6 (8.7)	50.9 (10.5)	54.7 (12.6)	55.2 (12.9)	55.5 (13.1)	55.6 (13.1)	52.5 (11.4)	47.1 (8.4)	42.0 (5.6)	49.3 (9.6)
Record low °F (°C)	19 (−7)	29 (−2)	30 (−1)	34 (1)	39 (4)	41 (5)	46 (8)	44 (7)	45 (7)	38 (3)	31 (−1)	21 (−6)	19 (−7)
Average precipitation inches (mm)	3.55 (90)	3.10 (79)	2.31 (59)	1.37 (35)	0.38 (9.7)	0.16 (4.1)	0.03 (0.76)	0.04 (1.0)	0.20 (5.1)	1.05 (27)	2.08 (53)	3.38 (86)	17.65 (448)
Average snowfall inches (cm)	0.4 (1.0)	0.0 (0.0)	0.0 (0.0)	0.0 (0.0)	0.0 (0.0)	0.0 (0.0)	0.0 (0.0)	0.0 (0.0)	0.0 (0.0)	0.0 (0.0)	0.0 (0.0)	0.0 (0.0)	0.4 (1)
Average precipitation days (≥ 0.01 in)	9	9	8	5	2	1	0	0	1	3	6	9	53
Source: Western Regional Climate Center

== Arts and culture ==
=== Bailey Art Museum ===
The Bailey Art Museum features the work of internationally acclaimed sculptor Clayton Bailey, a resident of nearby Port Costa. The 3,200-square-foot (300 m^{2}) space brings together works from across the artist's five decades plus career featuring examples of Funk art, Nut art, ceramics, and metal sculpture (including robots and space guns), as well as pseudo-scientific curiosities by the artist's alter-ego, Dr. Gladstone. The collection also includes watercolor drawings by Betty Bailey and a gift shop.

=== Crockett Historical Society ===
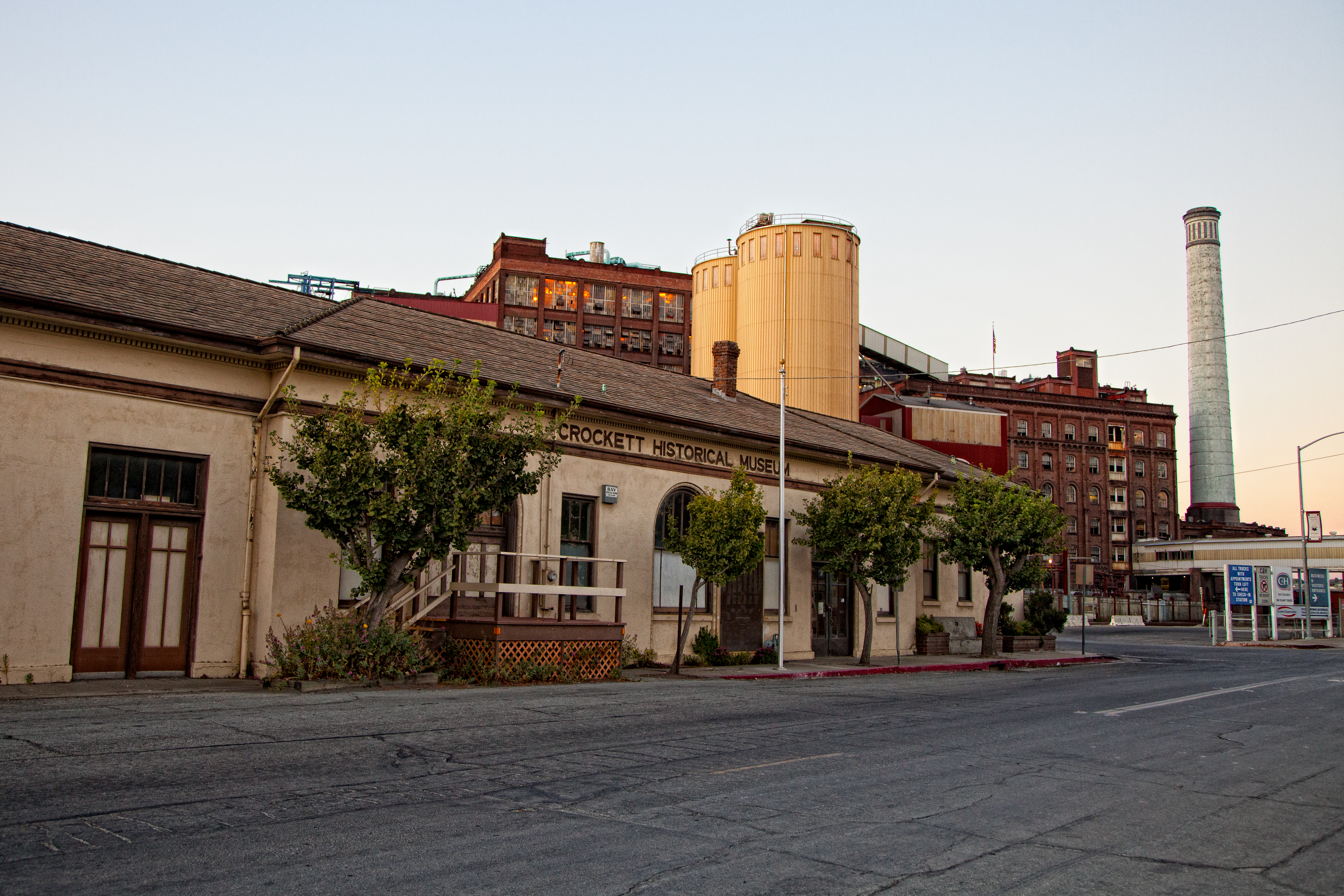
The former Crockett railroad station, now home of the Crockett Historical Society. C & H refinery in the background. September 12, 2012.

The former Crockett railroad station now serves as the home of the Crockett Historical Society.

== Demographics ==
Historical population
Census	Pop.	Note	%±
1990	3,228		—
2000	3,194		−1.1%
2010	3,094		−3.1%
2020	3,242		4.8%
U.S. Decennial Census; 1990 2000 2010

Crockett first appeared as a census-designated place in the 1990 United States census.

=== Racial and ethnic composition ===
Crockett CDP, California – Racial and ethnic composition Note: the US Census treats Hispanic/Latino as an ethnic category. This table excludes Latinos from the racial categories and assigns them to a separate category. Hispanics/Latinos may be of any race.
Race / Ethnicity (NH = Non-Hispanic)	Pop 2000	Pop 2010	Pop 2020	% 2000	% 2010	% 2020
White alone (NH)	2,529	2,203	1,952	79.18%	71.20%	60.21%
Black or African American alone (NH)	100	140	199	3.13%	4.52%	6.14%
Native American or Alaska Native alone (NH)	26	14	13	0.81%	0.45%	0.40%
Asian alone (NH)	83	102	176	2.60%	3.30%	5.43%
Native Hawaiian or Pacific Islander alone (NH)	0	23	6	0.00%	0.74%	0.19%
Other race alone (NH)	3	5	26	0.09%	0.16%	0.80%
Mixed race or Multiracial (NH)	82	117	245	2.57%	3.78%	7.56%
Hispanic or Latino (any race)	371	490	625	11.62%	15.84%	19.28%
Total	3,194	3,094	3,242	100.00%	100.00%	100.00%

=== 2020 census ===
As of the 2020 census, Crockett had a population of 3,242. The population density was 3,052.7 inhabitants per square mile (1,178.7/km^{2}). The median age was 46.6 years.

The census reported that 100% of the population lived in households. 100.0% of residents lived in urban areas, while 0.0% lived in rural areas.

There were 1,537 households, out of which 19.3% included children under the age of 18, 35.6% were married-couple households, 8.8% were cohabiting couple households, 34.3% had a female householder with no spouse or partner present, and 21.3% had a male householder with no spouse or partner present. 36.0% of households were one person, and 15.9% were one person aged 65 or older. The average household size was 2.11. There were 843 families (54.8% of all households).

The age distribution was 13.9% under the age of 18, 5.3% aged 18 to 24, 28.9% aged 25 to 44, 29.8% aged 45 to 64, and 22.0% who were 65 years of age or older. For every 100 females, there were 92.6 males, and for every 100 females age 18 and over, there were 91.6 males age 18 and over.

There were 1,676 housing units at an average density of 1,578.2 units per square mile (609.3 units/km^{2}), of which 1,537 (91.7%) were occupied. Of occupied units, 54.5% were owner-occupied and 45.5% were occupied by renters. Of all housing units, 8.3% were vacant; the homeowner vacancy rate was 2.0% and the rental vacancy rate was 7.5%.

== Economy ==
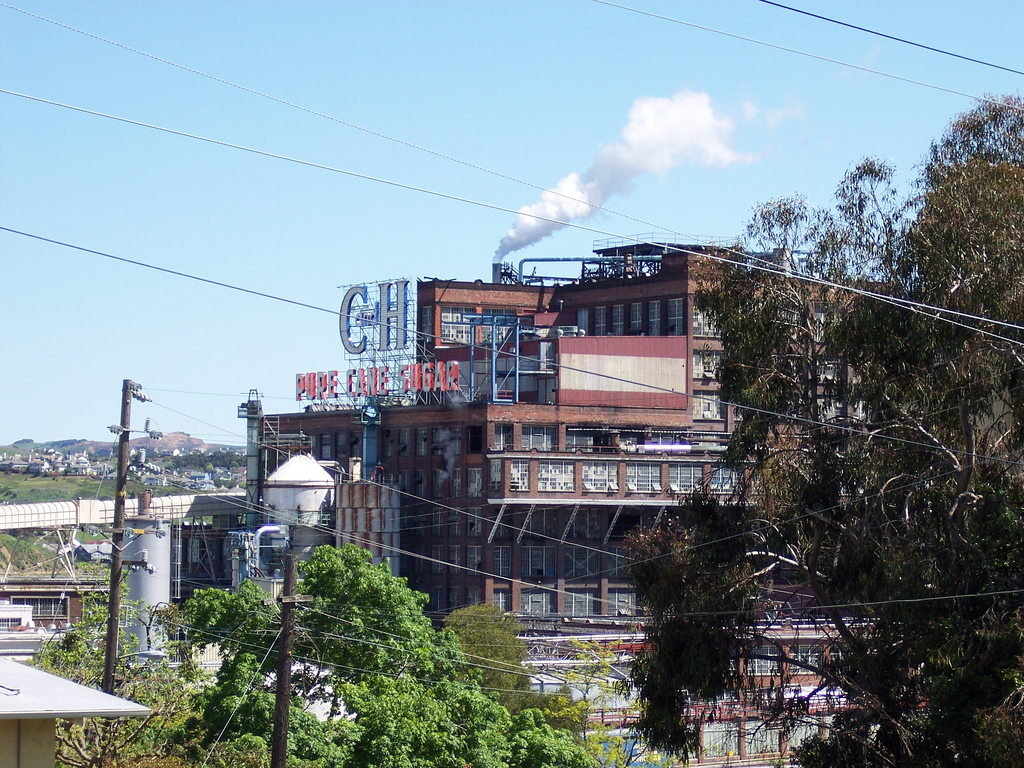
C&H Pure Cane Sugar refinery in Crockett

Crockett is home to the corporate headquarters of C&H Sugar, a subsidiary of American Sugar Refining.

Crockett also contains a fuel storage facility owned by the NuStar Energy L.P. Corporation. This facility primarily consists of 24 storage tanks, designed to hold an aggregate of 3 million barrels (130 million US gallons). Two of these tanks are reserved for containing ethanol, which NuStar blends with other motor fuel components to make low-emissions automobile fuel mandated by California laws.

== Education ==
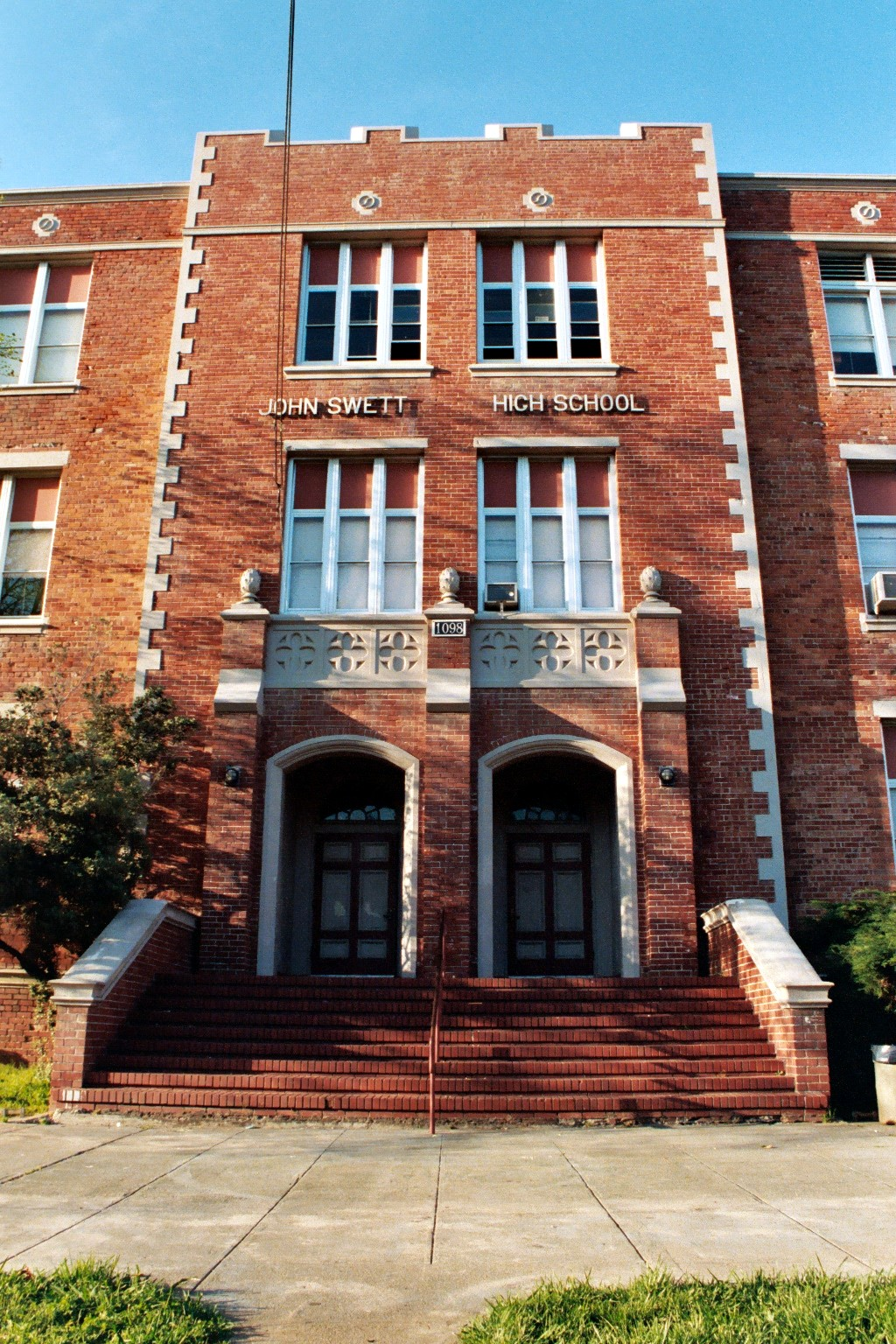
Main entrance of John Swett High School in 2004

Crockett is part of the John Swett Unified School District, and is home to both Carquinez Middle School and John Swett High School.

The Crockett Library of the Contra Costa County Library is located in Crockett.

== Recreation ==
Crockett is bordered to the south and the east by two regional parks operated by the East Bay Regional Park District.

Crockett Hills Regional Park lies south of Crockett. The 1,939-acre park ranges in elevation from 150 to 800 feet, offering views of San Pablo Bay, the Delta, Mount Tamalpais, and Mount Diablo. Trails include a 4.5-mile segment of the Bay Area Ridge Trail. Crockett Hills is an excellent mountain biking park.

Carquinez Strait Regional Shoreline comprises 1,415 acres of bluffs and shoreline along Carquinez Scenic Drive between the town of Crockett and the hillsides overlooking Martinez.

The topography of Crockett Ranch Regional Park and the adjoining Carquinez Regional Shoreline consists of open, rolling grasslands, wooded ravines, eucalyptus-shaded meadows, and river shoreline. Multi-purpose trails provide access to canyon views and ridgetop vistas.

== Notable people ==
- Aldo Ray (1926–1991), American movie actor (born Aldo Da Re) born in Pennsylvania, who moved to Crockett when he was four years old. (Note: Aldo Ray's father worked at the C & H sugar refinery in Crockett.) After serving in the U.S. Navy in WWII, returned to Crockett, where he was elected Constable, then left to pursue a movie career. His most profitable film to date was the adult film Sweet Savage starring Carol Connors. It is one of the few pornographic films in the American Western movie genre. In 1980, Ray was awarded Best Actor from the Adult Film Association's third Erotica Awards.
- Dino Waldren (born 1991), professional rugby player with the United States national rugby union team
