= Jonas Wood =

American painter (born 1977)

- Born: 1977 (age 48–49); Boston, Massachusetts
- Known for: Painting
- Movement: Contemporary art
- Spouse: Shio Kusaka

Jonas Wood (born 1977 in Boston, Massachusetts) is a contemporary artist based in Los Angeles.

== Early life and education ==
Raised in Boston, Wood is the child of "art-inclined parents". Wood grew up surrounded by his grandfather's art collection which featured works from Francis Bacon, Alexander Calder, Jim Dine, Robert Motherwell, Larry Rivers, and Andy Warhol. He graduated from the Cambridge School of Weston in 1995.

As an undergraduate, Wood chose to study at Hobart College, a liberal arts school where he could study both science and art. Wood's focus was on psychology during the majority of his time studying at Hobart and William Smith College. By his junior year, he had completed his psychology major and he spent his senior year studying painting. He now holds a Bachelor of Arts in psychology from Hobart and William Smith Colleges in 1999 and a Masters of Fine Arts degree from University of Washington in 2002.

Shortly after graduating, Wood moved to Los Angeles, where he worked as a studio assistant for two years for painter Laura Owens and then another two years for sculptor Matt Johnson. He and Kusaka also worked for artist Charles Ray. While working as an assistant, Wood continued to make his own work.

== Process ==
During his student years, he explored making collage-like works based on montaged photographs that he took of himself, his friends, and their surroundings. Wood now paints from studies (collages and drawings) and sometimes uses photography, but most of his works and studies are part of the larger plan of creating paintings. Wood states, "I work from photos. I collect photos, ones I’ve taken or I’ve appropriated or that other people have sent to me. And then I either make a collage of those things or work directly from photos. And a bunch of times, I'll make a drawing from a found photo, a photo collage, or photo I took, and then make a painting from that drawing." Wood has also done etchings. He maintains active drawing, printmaking, and collage practices, each of which helps him generate techniques that he eventually uses in his paintings.

Wood's studio is filled with the objects that influence his work, such as his children's drawings, plants, vessels, and sport memorabilia. An example of this includes a giant basketball sculpture by Paa Joe. He also works close to his partner, Shio Kusaka, whose work he appropriates and collaborates with. Wood's influences are also auditory, as he tends to listen to basketball podcasts while he works.

A New York Times article by Janelle Zara states, "the studio is where Wood culls various photographs from the internet or his own archive and uses them as source material for his paintings". The appropriated imagery is organized in labeled folders in his studio to be physically accessible during his painting process. The images are printed out and pinned onto walls, then flattened and distilled into blocks of color. Wood then layers these "dense graphic patterns, overlapping fields of stipples and stripes, circles, squares, dots and wood grains".

== Themes ==
Helen's Room (2017) at the National Gallery of Art in 2023

Jonas Wood's paintings, drawings, and prints can be described as a myriad of genres, such as domestic interiors, landscapes, still-life and sports scenes. Translating the three-dimensional world around him into flat color and line, he confounds expectations of scale and vantage point that reflect visions of the contemporary world.

In an Architectural Digest story by Rebecca Bates, Wood claimed to paint to create new memories of his former residences: "I'm interested in exploring the spaces that I’ve inhabited and the psychological impact they've had on me and my memories of them,...And then I can create a new memory of that space." The result is the perception that his work is very sincere.

== Style ==
Wood's style is described as multidimensional. In T, he was described as working "With one foot in Modernist cool and the other in vibrant Pop Art". Similarly, Artspace describes his work as if he works "With one foot rooted in Analytic Cubism and the other in Contemporary Pop art". In The Huffington Post Wood is described in reminiscence of classic masters: "Although Wood pays homage to Van Gogh along with other abstract colorists like Matisse, Picasso and Keith Haring, his works are decidedly modern... Both steeped in tradition yet completely fresh, Wood captures the impossible sharpness of modernity with the familiar feelings of home." Roberta Smith of The New York Times notes that "his works negotiate an uneasy truce among the abstract, the representational, the photographic and the just plain weird."

Smith compares his work to those of Daniel Heidkamp. In another story about Wood, Smith noted that as a painter who paints his own life, his art bears similarity to Édouard Vuillard, Henri Matisse, Alex Katz and David Hockney.

== Exhibitions ==
Black Dragon Society was the first gallery in Los Angeles to represent his work and give him a solo exhibition in 2006. Artist Mark Grotjahn saw Wood's paintings at that show and told Anton Kern Gallery in New York City about it. The result was Anton Kern Gallery mounting a one-man exhibition for Wood during the summer of 2007, and then Shane Campbell Gallery in Chicago hosted a solo show two months later. From that point on, he has continued to exhibit his work regularly.

Past solo exhibition have been held at the Dallas Museum of Art (2019); Museum Voorlinden, Wassenaar, the Netherlands (with Shio Kusaka, 2017); Lever House, New York (2014); and Hammer Museum, Los Angeles (2010).

Other solo projects include Still Life with Two Owls (MOCA), the façade of the Museum of Contemporary Art, Los Angeles (2016- 2018); Shelf Still Life, High Line Billboard, High Line Art, New York (2014); and LAXART Billboard and Façade, LAXART, Los Angeles (2014).

His work is included in the permanent collections of many institutions, among them the Albright-Knox Art Gallery, Buffalo, New York; Centre Pompidou, Paris; Dallas Museum of Art; Fundación Jumex, Mexico City; Hammer Museum, Los Angeles; Marciano Art Foundation, Los Angeles; Metropolitan Museum of Art, New York; Museum of Contemporary Art, Los Angeles; San Francisco Museum of Modern Art; Solomon R. Guggenheim Museum, New York; Broad Foundation, Los Angeles; Museum of Modern Art, New York; and Whitney Museum of American Art, New York.

== Art market ==
Wood has been represented by David Kordansky Gallery since 2011.

In May 2019, Christie's set an auction record for Wood's work when Japanese Garden 3 sold for a $4.9 million.

== Personal life ==
Wood currently shares a studio with artist Shio Kusaka, his wife since 2002. Shio Kusaka, born in Japan, creates distinctive porcelain, and Wood then photographs and paints the pieces for co-operative exhibitions. The pair often work in tandem, motifs migrating from Kusaka's ceramic vessels to Wood's paintings and back again. He and Kusaka also incorporate imagery from their expansive art collection—including works by Alighiero Boetti, Michael Frimkess and Magdalena Suarez Frimkess, Mark Grotjahn, and Ed Ruscha—as well as from their children's storybooks and drawings. They co-author art books in a series with the pen name Wood Kusaka Studios.

In 2015 Gagosian Gallery in Hong Kong presented Blackwelder, which brought together Wood's and Kusaka's works in a dedicated two-person exhibition. This was followed by the couple's first collaborative museum exhibition, at Museum Voorlinden, Wassenaar, Netherlands, in 2017.

== Bibliography ==
- Jacob Samuel, Jonas Wood: Prints, Gagosian and Rizzoli, New York, 2019.
- Anna Katherine Brodbeck, Ken Allan, Hans Ulrich Obrist, Jonas Wood, Dallas Museum of Art, 2019.
- Mark Grotjahn, Helen Molesworth, Ian Alteveer, Jonas Wood, Phaidon, London, 2019.
