= California Clay Movement =

1950s school of ceramic art

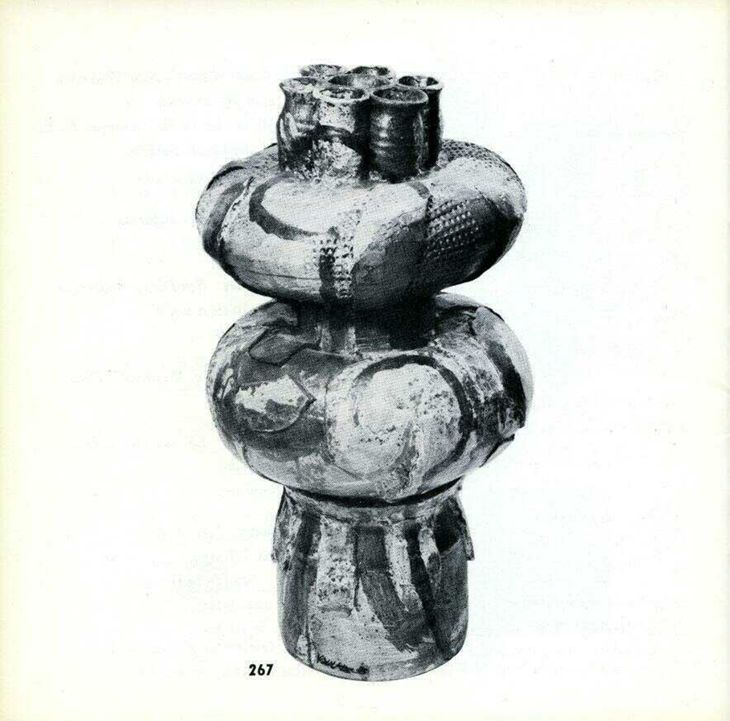
Peter Voulkos, "Vase", stoneware sculpture, from Craftsmanship in a Changing World (1956)

The California Clay Movement (or American Clay Revolution) was a school of ceramic art that emerged in California in the 1950s. The movement was part of the larger transition in crafts from "designer-craftsman" to "artist-craftsman". The editor of Craft Horizons, New York-based Rose Slivka, became an enthusiastic advocate of the movement.

== Peter Voulkos ==
Peter Voulkos was one of the movement's driving forces. He established the Ceramic Center at the Los Angeles County Art Institute (now the Otis College of Art and Design), where he created massive, abstract ceramic sculptures. He felt that his free-form ceramic works were like jazz compositions: improvisational and free spirited. Voulkos began creating ever larger ceramic works to break away from the conventional arts and crafts of his day. Some of his work, named "plates", "ice buckets" or "tea bowls", were "deconstructed" traditional forms of glazed pottery. Others, such as his "stacks", were non-utilitarian and purely sculptural. During a career that lasted almost half a century, Voulkos made over 200 "stacks", some as much as 2 metres (6 ft 7 in) in height. Writing about the clay movement in 1963, a reviewer in Time said "Peter Voulkos' rough, ragged monuments are powerful weapons against the slick coffee-table pottery that often passes for modern art, and already a generation of fierce West Coast individualists has joined him at the barricades."

== Pupils ==
Voulkos profoundly influenced Jim Melchert, John Mason, Kenneth Price and Paul Soldner. Voulkos turned the Los Angeles County Art Institute into an important center for ceramic art between 1954 and 1959. Moving to the University of California, Berkeley he and sculptors such as Sidney Gordon and Harold Paris developed an influential school of sculpture. His pupils included Kenneth Price, Billy Al Bengston, Robert Arneson, Nancy Selvin and Stan Bitters. The work of Voulkos, Arneson and others typified Californian art in the 1950s and 1960s, and was featured in many exhibitions.

Stephen De Staebler was another influential sculptor working mostly in clay and bronze who has been associated with the California Clay movement. A reviewer said of him that "He practically invented his own art form by beating and buckling tons of clay into awesome mountainous landscapes, but his human sculptures are also very moving." Michael Frimkess is another master of the California clay movement. Frimkess was a student of Peter Voulkos, and adopted the abstract expressionist style of sculpture taught by Voulkos. In 2014, Frimkess received the Career Achievement Award from the Hammer Museum.

== Influence ==
Voulkos had huge influence, not just on potters and sculptors but even on painters. Awareness of the movement quickly spread. In 1959 the Guyanese artist Donald Locke obtained a grant to study for a master's degree in fine arts at Edinburgh College of Art, a school in the University of Edinburgh. There he met the artists Dave Cohen, Sheldon Kaganof and Dion Myers, who introduced the ideas of the California Clay Movement to Britain. For many years his work reflected their influence.
