= Frimkess =

Frimkess is a surname. Notable people with the surname include:

- Magdalena Suarez Frimkess (born 1929), Venezuelan ceramic artist
- Michael Frimkess (1937–2025), American ceramic artist
