= Lesley Vance =

Lesley Vance may refer to:

- Lesley Vance (politician) (1939–2015), American politician
- Lesley Vance (artist) (born 1977), American artist
