= Weatherford =

Weatherford may refer to:

== Cities and towns ==
- Weatherford, Oklahoma, a city
- Weatherford, Texas, a city

== People ==
- Jack Weatherford, American professor, ethnographer, and anthropologist
- James K. Weatherford (1850–1935), American lawyer and politician
- Mary Weatherford (born 1963), American artist
- Sterling Weatherford (born 1999), American football player
- Steve Weatherford (born 1982), American football punter
- Will Weatherford (born 1979), American politician

== Other uses ==
- Weatherford College, a college in Weatherford, Texas
- Weatherford Hall, a dormitory at Oregon State University named after James K. Weatherford
- Weatherford International, an oilfield services company
