= Michael Frimkess =

American ceramic artist (1937–2025)

- Born: January 8, 1937; Los Angeles, California
- Died: February 28, 2025 (aged 88)
- Education: Otis College of Art and Design (MFA)
- Occupation: Ceramist
- Years active: 1955–2025
- Movement: California Clay Movement
- Spouse: Magdalena Suarez Frimkess

Michael Frimkess (January 8, 1937 – February 28, 2025) was an American ceramic artist who lived in Venice, California. In the 1950s and 60s, he was a pupil of Peter Voulkos, a prominent figure in the California Clay Movement. Frimkess' pottery is noted for its classical style, employing forms from Greek, Chinese, and Indigenous American antiquity. His wife and collaborator, Magdalena Suarez Frimkess, decorated some of his ceramic pieces, often using anachronistic, contemporary images like Minnie Mouse or Condorito. He is also well-known for his innovative wheel-throwing and firing techniques.

== Early life and education ==
Frimkess was born on January 8, 1937 in East Los Angeles, California. He grew up largely in the neighborhood of Boyle Heights and claimed (inaccurately) to have been among the last Jewish families in the area. His father, Lou Frimkess, was an artist and graphic designer. He was exposed to fine art early in his childhood, receiving drawing and sculpting lessons, and being taken to numerous museum exhibitions. Frimkess learned how to play the saxophone and piano in his youth and aspired to become a jazz musician like his idol, Charlie “Bird” Parker. At age 15, his family moved to Hollywood and he would graduate from Hollywood High School two years later in 1955. In high school, he took up sculpture, which led him to seek out art schools after graduation. At the age of 17 he became the youngest person to receive a scholarship from the Otis College of Art and Design (then known as the Los Angeles County Art Institute).

After a year at the college, Frimkess switched his focus to ceramics, a move that he attributes to a peyote-induced vision of himself throwing a perfectly-shaped vessel. In the ceramics department, he studied under Peter Voulkos, perhaps the most notable figure in the California Clay Movement. He also worked alongside sculptors and ceramists like Billy Al Bengston, John Mason, Kenneth Price, Paul Soldner, and others. In 1956, he was one of 10 young artists to open and display work at a gallery on Sunset Boulevard. In 1957, Frimkess worked in a small ceramics factory while on a trip with his family in Italy, where he received additional training in throwing a very hard type of clay.

== Career ==
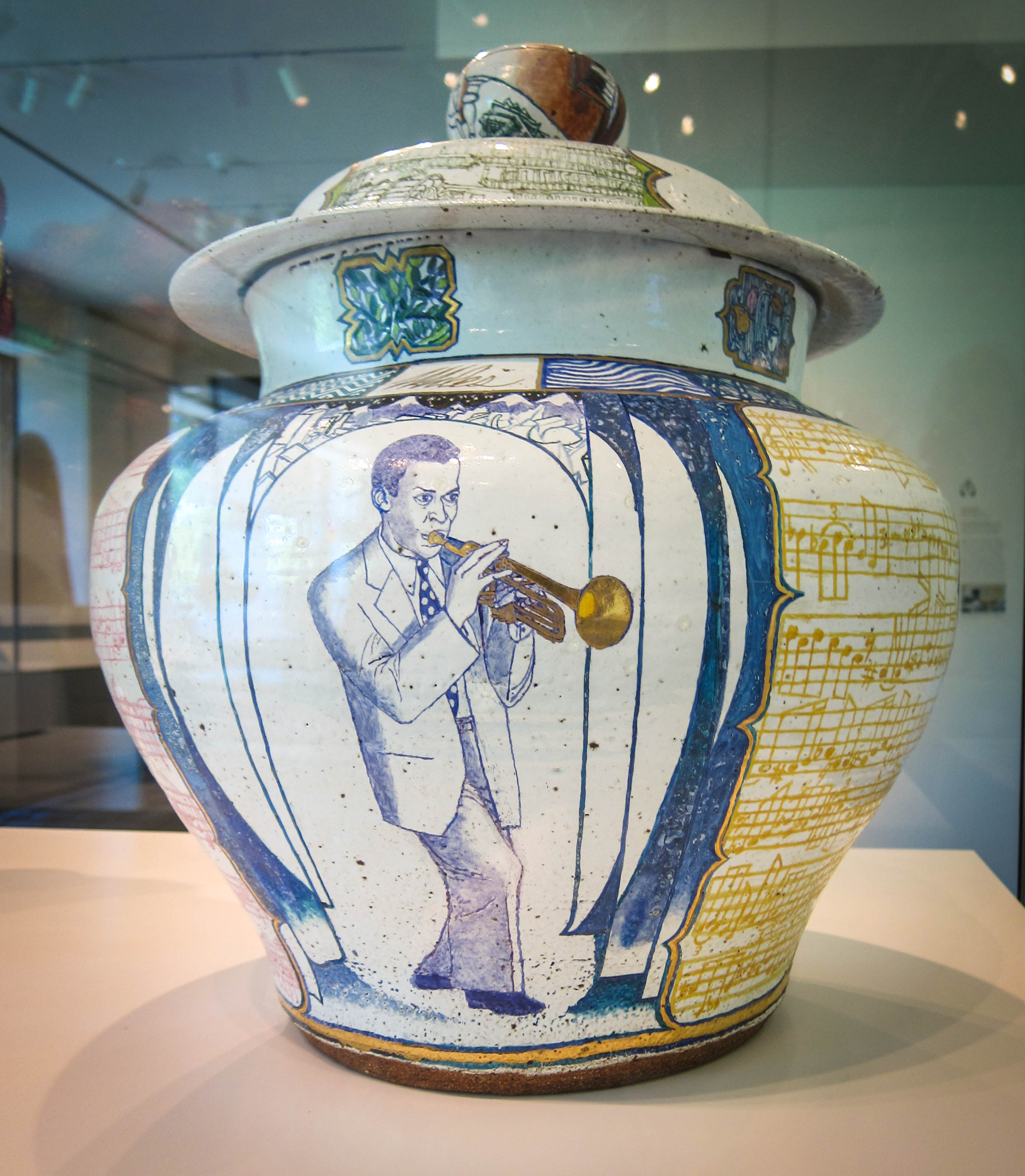
Blues for Dr. Banks by Michael and Magdalena Frimkess

In the early 1960s, Frimkess went to Berkeley, California where Peter Voulkos was then teaching at the University of California, Berkeley. While there, he studied bronze and aluminum casting with Voulkos. In 1963, his piece "Hooker No. 1" (a bronze sculpture of a television) was displayed at the San Francisco Art Institute's Annual exhibition at the San Francisco Museum of Modern Art. Also that year at the behest of Voulkos, Frimkess took an internship at the Clay Art Center in Port Chester, New York. It was there that he met his future wife and frequent collaborator, Magdalena Suarez, who had come to the Art Center from Venezuela as part of a fellowship program. While on the east coast, Frimkess was instructed to visit museums in New York City and Boston to study Greek and Chinese forms of pottery. He also began learning the technique of "dry throwing" clay rather than using water. Much of his work after 1965 replicated classical forms like Greek volute kraters, Zuni pots, and Chinese ginger jars.

In 1966, his work was featured in the Abstract Expressionist Ceramics exhibition, which was displayed at several locations including in the art gallery of the University of California, Irvine and, later, the San Francisco Museum of Art. In 1970, his work was featured alongside Robert Arneson, Ron Nagle, and David Gilhooly's in an exhibit at the Moore College of Art in Philadelphia, Pennsylvania. In 1971, Frimkess was diagnosed with multiple sclerosis. His subsequent focus on rehab and physical therapy took time away from his ceramic work and limited his output. He continued to throw the pots, and his wife Magdalena Suarez Frimkess would glaze and decorate them.

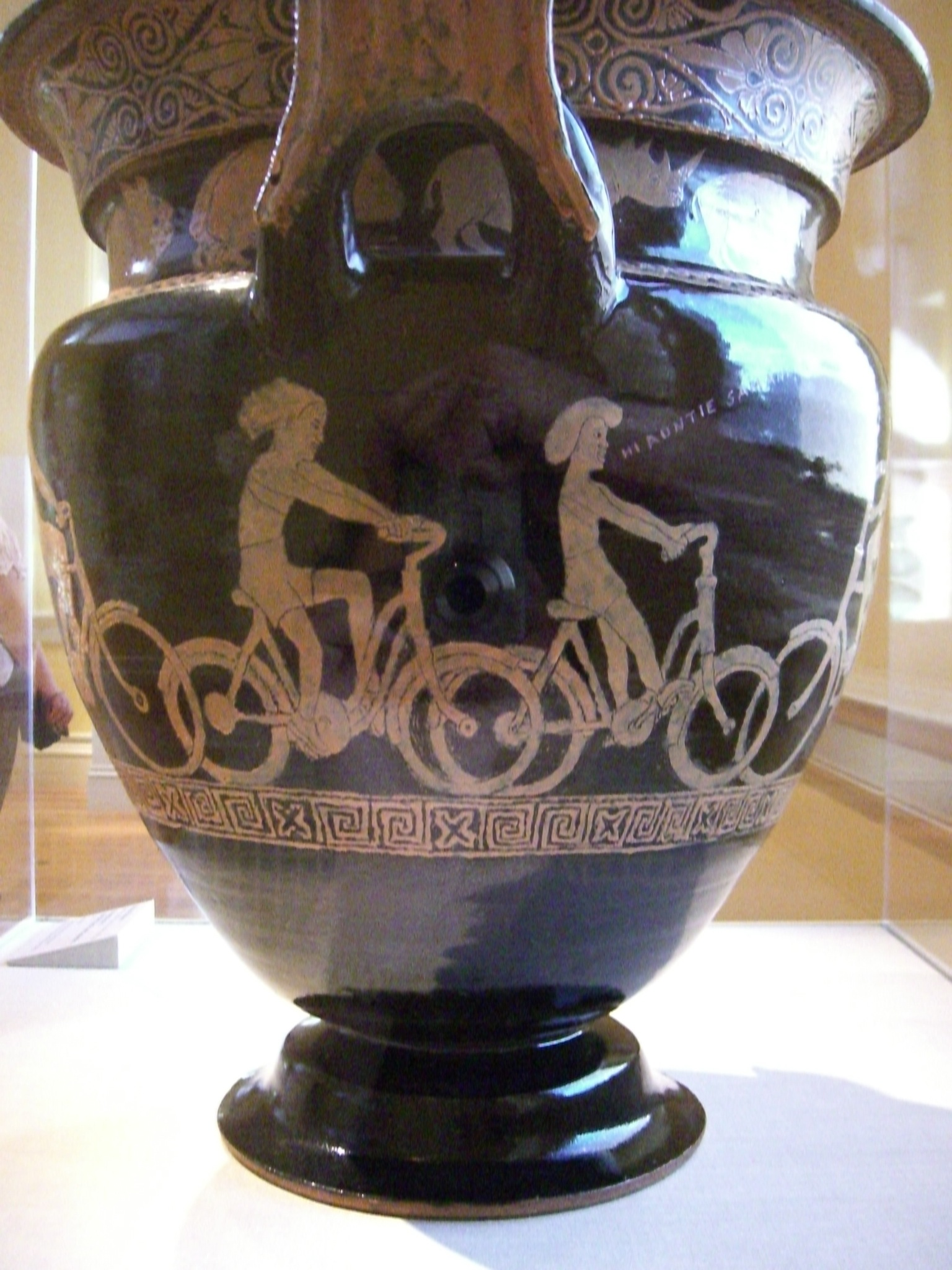
Out Biking with Aunt Samantha by Michael Frimkess, as displayed in the Renwick Gallery

In 1976, Frimkess' work was featured at the Clay: The Medium and the Method exhibition held at the art gallery of the University of California, Santa Barbara. A year later, his work was displayed at the Los Angeles Institute of Contemporary Art for their exhibition entitled Foundations in Clay. The latter exhibition was considered an update of the Abstract Expressionist Ceramics exhibition from 1966 with five of the six artists returning, including Peter Voulkos, Ron Nagle, Kenneth Price, and John Mason. That year, the James Willis Gallery in San Francisco also displayed a 17-year retrospective of Frimkess' work. Another retrospective of his solo and collaborative work was held in 1982 at the Garth Clark Gallery in Los Angeles.

By 1988, Frimkess' work could be found in the Smithsonian Institution, American Craft Museum, and the National Museum of Modern Art in Kyoto, Japan. That year, his work was also featured as part of an exhibition at the Fashion Institute of Technology called Extended Visions which displayed work from artists with multiple sclerosis. In 2000, Frimkess and his wife held an exhibition of their work at Louis Stern Fine Arts entitled, Vessels of Satire: The Art of Magdalena and Michael Frimkess. In 2001, the two provided an official oral history of their lives and work to the Smithsonian Institution's Archives of American Art. In 2003, they displayed some of their work at Little Tokyo Clayworks in Los Angeles. Beginning in 2012, their work started being displayed at South Willard, a menswear shop also in Los Angeles.

In 2013, some of Frimkess' early work was displayed at an exhibition called Grapevine at the David Kordansky Gallery in Culver City, California. In March 2014, the Frimkesses' collaborative work was on display at White Columns in New York. Their work was again featured at the Hammer Museum's biennial exhibition, Made in L.A. in August 2014. The couple was also honored with the Made in L.A. Mohn Career Achievement Award. In 2016, their work was featured at an exhibition called Routine Pleasures at the MAK Center in West Hollywood, California.

In addition to exhibitions, Frimkess' work has appeared in numerous publications, including Ceramics Monthly, American Ceramics, and Craft Horizons magazines. In 1966 Frimkess wrote an article for Craft Horizons entitled, "The Importance of Being Classical," and he was later featured in its December 1973 issue ("Michael Frimkess and the Cultured Pot"). More recently, Michael and Magdalena have been profiled in both the Los Angeles Times and the New York Times.

== Artistic style ==
Frimkess' early work included a variety of both ceramics and bronze or aluminum sculptures. These early pieces were often more free-form and less utilitarian, taking a cue from his mentor and teacher, Peter Voulkos. His interest and skill in making classical pottery forms began to increase in the mid-1960s. Examples of his work include Greek volute kraters, Zuni pots, and Chinese ginger jars. He also learned the technique of dry throwing hard clay with no water to make his vessels, resulting in walls that are remarkably light and thin. In addition, through his expertise and efforts in kiln design and construction, he developed a method of firing stoneware in as little as 55 minutes.

Prior to his multiple sclerosis diagnosis, Frimkess would glaze and paint all of his ceramics, decorating them with contemporary scenes and pop art. The images were often "vernacular or historical" and employed the use of cartoon sequences or word balloons that often satirized problems related to corruption, segregation, and hypocrisy. His work frequently dealt with racial strife, and he often drew on his childhood growing up in a predominately Chicano, Japanese, and Black neighborhood. His pots were meant to symbolize an ideal "melting pot."

Since his multiple sclerosis diagnosis in 1971, most of the art painted on his pots has been done by his wife, Magdalena Suarez Frimkess. While her art has similar themes, it evokes a different cultural experience. Her glazes and paintings feature pop art icons like Minnie Mouse and Condorito, but they also employ folk art combined with a variety of historical references. In general, neither of the two had any input on the other's work.

Frimkess died on February 28, 2025, at the age of 88.
