= Stephen De Staebler =

American sculptor, printmaker, and educator (1933 - 2011)

- Born: March 24, 1933; Webster Groves, Missouri, U.S.
- Died: May 13, 2011 (aged 78); Berkeley, California, U.S.
- Other names: Stephen de Staebler, Stephen Destaebler
- Education: Black Mountain College; Brooklyn Museum Art School; Princeton University; University of California, Berkeley
- Occupations: sculptor, ceramicist, educator
- Employer(s): San Francisco State University, San Francisco Art Institute
- Movement: California Clay Movement
- Spouse: Dona Merced Curley (m. 1958–1996; death)
- Parents: Herbert Conrad De Staebler (father); Juliette Hoiles De Staebler (mother)

Stephen De Staebler (March 24, 1933 – May 13, 2011) was an American sculptor, printmaker, and educator, he was best recognized for his work in clay and bronze. Totemic and fragmented in form, De Staebler's figurative sculptures call forth the many contingencies of the human condition, such as resiliency and fragility, growth and decay, earthly boundedness and the possibility for spiritual transcendence. An important figure in the California Clay Movement, he is credited with "sustaining the figurative tradition in post-World War II decades when the relevance and even possibility of embracing the human figure seemed problematic at best."

== Early life ==
De Staebler was born in Webster Groves, Missouri, a suburb of St. Louis, and spent his childhood in the nearby suburb of Kirkwood. From an early age, he was encouraged to develop his artistic interests by his parents, Herbert Conrad De Staebler (1898–1963) and Juliette Hoiles De Staebler (1903–1950).

Many of De Staebler's childhood summers were spent on his maternal grandparents’ 775-acre farm in rural Shoals, Indiana. The lodging, which he shared with his mother and siblings, Herbert Conrad "Hobey" Jr. (1929–2008) and Juliette Jeanne "Jan" (1931–2006), was a rustic cabin built next to the bluffs of the White River. This early immersion in the natural world shaped the artist's developing aesthetic. De Staebler said, “I fell in love with the river that winds around our family farm in Indiana. It is bordered by a bluff intricately carved by water and wind. It has caves and natural stairways up fissures just wide enough to squeeze through. I sometimes think that my impulses were all formed as a child there.”

When De Staebler was eight, his father met with the director of the St. Louis Art Museum to discuss his son's burgeoning art practice. While at the museum, a bronze copy of the Hellenistic marble sculpture Laocoön and His Sons made an indelible impression on the young artist's psyche. He subsequently signed up for painting lessons with Warren "Gus" Ludwig, an art professor of Washington University in St. Louis, and later took a private clay modeling class with Amanda Hawkins at John Burroughs School, a St. Louis prep school.

== Education ==
De Staebler matriculated at Princeton University in 1950, where he studied archeology, art history and religion. Joe Brown, a former professional boxer recognized for his sculptures of sports figures, served as De Staebler's mentor during this stage of his education. Following his freshman year, De Staebler attended summer session at Black Mountain College in Black Mountain, North Carolina, where he studied with the social realist Ben Shahn. Other guest faculty at this time included Robert Motherwell and David Tudor.

In 1952, De Staebler traveled to Europe aboard the Greek freighter “The Atlantic Beacon.” Once in Europe, he visited cities across Italy (Genoa, Pisa, Sienna, Rome, Assisi, Padua, Venice, Ravenna, Florence, Milan), Switzerland (Berne and Basel), France (Paris, Chartres) and England (London) where he was exposed to canonical works of art and architecture, including Chartres Cathedral and iconic sculptures such as the Belvedere Torso in the Vatican Museums in Rome, Michelangelo's unfinished Captives at the Galleria dell'Accademia in Florence, the Rondanini Pietà at the Castello Sforzesco in Milan, the Winged Victory of Samothrace at the Louvre in Paris, and the Three Goddesses from the Parthenon at the British Museum in London. Two years after this cultural pilgrimage, De Staebler graduated from Princeton magna cum laude with a degree in Religious Studies. His senior thesis, “St. Francis of Assisi and His Imitation of Christ,” explored the life and work of the much venerated founder of the Franciscan Order.

In his obituary for the artist, art critic Kenneth Baker writes: “[De Staebler’s] academic study of religion at Princeton University gave him a philosophical grounding in the existentialist perspective on life to which he was temperamentally inclined. ‘We are all wounded survivors,’ he told an interviewer recently, ‘alive but devastated selves, fragmented, isolated – the condition of modern man. Art tries to restructure reality so that we can live with the suffering’ ".

At the conclusion of his undergraduate studies, De Staebler was awarded a Fulbright Scholarship to Italy to study the connections between Benito Mussolini`s regime and the Vatican. He ultimately declined the award and instead volunteered for United States Army, where he was trained in Teletype at stations in Hof an der Saale and West Berlin, Germany.

In 1957, he attended ceramics classes at Brooklyn Museum Art School, studying under Ka Kwong Hui. Soon after returning to the States, De Staebler moved to the San Francisco Bay Area with his first wife, Dona Merced Curley, earning a teaching credential in secondary education followed by a master’s degree in fine art from University of California, Berkeley in 1961. While at Berkeley, De Staebler studied under Peter Voulkos, a renowned abstract sculptor who flouted ceramic’s categorization as mere craft, elevating it to the realm of the fine arts. Voulkos’ emphasis on clay's organic properties and expressive potential deeply influenced De Staebler and reactivated his childhood affinity for nature.

== Materials ==
=== Ceramic ===
Seated Figure with Yellow Flame, porcelain, stoneware and clay sculpture by Stephen De Staebler, 1985, Smithsonian American Art Museum

De Staebler's ceramic sculptures harness the inherent qualities of clay, his primary medium during the earlier years of his career, to create raw, fragmented indexes of the body, the landscape and even the landscape as body. The equally organic and preternatural qualities of his forms evoke the tenuous relationships between earthly monumentality and spiritual transcendence, fragmentation and wholeness, and fragility and strength. This tendency for slippage serves a productive purpose, allowing the works to inhabit the discursive space between more prescriptive categories. Seated Figure with Yellow Flame, in the collection of the Smithsonian American Art Museum is a typical example of his anthropomorphic works.

Donald Kuspit observes how De Stabeler's art can be seen as: “an attempt to strip the human figure down to its most elemental, ‘almost simplistic,’ terms, revealing it in all its archaic bodiliness. He wants to disinter it from its modernity – the sense of its purely functional significance, of its ideal existence as that of a happy machine – and recover a sense of its flesh as morbidly immediate if also cosmic in import, linked to the strange tumult of raw matter in formation.” He goes on to describe how De Staebler seeks “to create a modern religious art, utilizing archaic forms for an ‘archaic’ purpose: the articulation and remediation of suffering. This generates the illusion of release from time and space we call ‘eternity.’ De Staebler's archaic figure symbolizes the process that leads to the eternal effect – that uncovers the eternal presentness of the primitively memorable – and the effect itself. It is about the impacted sublimity of our feelings for those we cherish, most of all, for ourselves.”

Rejecting traditional glazes for their tendency to impede the effects of the clay's materiality, De Staebler instead produced pigmentation by first working colored, powdered metal oxides directly into the clay matrix. After firing, the resulting ceramic exhibited subtle, muted hues that heighten the geologic properties of the clay’s origins.

=== Bronze ===
In the late 1970s, De Staebler turned to bronze after an injury temporarily curtailed his ability to create large-scale, ceramic figure columns. His interest in such a classical art historical medium might strike as counterintuitive, however De Staebler adapted the casting process to reflect his more deconstructed, liberated approach to art-making.

In a 1995 interview, De Stabeler explained how “working with the figure on its sculptural ground is like the figure/ground problem in painting, the relationship of the figure or object to the space around it […] when I shifted from clay to bronze, I learned quickly that the reason I needed bronze was to separate the figure even further from the ground and let it stand on its own form, which isn’t possible in clay. Bronze offers this great freedom to cantilever masses.”

Rather than being restricted to making bottom-heavy figures, as was often required by clay, bronze allowed De Staebler to create more gravity-defying sculptures that, with their gracefully attenuated legs, appear to exist on the cusp of collapse. While wing-like shapes were not novel to De Staebler's art, this new material precipitated a greater, more involved investigation of wings and their various symbolic manifestations within the realms of mythology, religion, the animal kingdom and nature. Notable winged figures include Winged Woman Walking (1987); Winged Victory at the Moores Opera House in the University of Houston; and Three Figures, City Center, Oakland, amongst others.

=== The Boneyard ===
De Staebler's later ceramic works use discarded bits of fired clay scouted from the “boneyard,” a repository behind his studio that had been accumulating such ephemera for over four decades. The archaeological quality of piecing together recovered fragments to create new forms – aggregated through irreducible – resonates with the artist's own interest in the intersection of mortality and transcendence. Regarding this process of “spontaneous archeology,” De Staebler said that “you take fragments that speak to one another and bring them into some kind of field that is more than the sum of its parts.”

== Teaching ==
After pursuing his graduate studies at Berkeley, De Staebler briefly taught at San Francisco State University before accepting a teaching position at the San Francisco Art Institute (1961 to 1967). In 1967, De Staebler returned to S.F. State where he taught until his retirement in 1990. During his tenure he worked with such notable colleagues as Peter Vandenberg, John Gutmann, Robert Bechtle, Richard McClean, Leonard Hunter, and Neal White.

In 1968, De Staebler participated in various “Happenings” around campus and conducted classes off-site, to protect students from police squads that had been stationed on campus during anti-Vietnam War demonstrations.

== Commissions ==
In 1963, De Staebler was commissioned to create Moab I for Prudential Savings and Loan in Salt Lake City, Utah, now in the collection of the Utah Museum of Fine Arts. Five years later, in 1968, De Staebler completed an important commission for the Holy Spirit Chapel, Newman Hall (on U.C. Berkeley's campus) for which he was tasked with creating the altar, tabernacle, crucifix, lectern and celebrant's chair. Subsequent commissions included:

- U.C. Berkeley Art Museum, 1970
- Bay Area Rapid Transit, Concord Station, 1972
- San Francisco Embarcadero Station, 1977
- San Francisco Arts Commission, Moscone Parking Garage, 1985–86
- Iowa State University, Ames, 1986
- Old St. Louis Post Office, Missouri, 1985–87
- New Harmony Inn and Convention Center, New Harmony, Indiana, 1986–98
- Geary-Market Investment Company, San Francisco, 1989
- Portman Building, Embarcadero Center, San Francisco, 1990
- San Jose Convention Center, 1993
- Graduate Theological Union, U.C. Berkeley, 1993
- City Center Garage/Amphitheater, Oakland, 1993
- Chiron Corporation, Emeryville, 1998

== Awards ==
De Staebler's honors and awards include two National Endowment for the Arts Fellowships, 1979 and 1981; Guggenheim Foundation Fellowship, 1983; American Academy and Institute of Arts and Letters Award in Art, 1989; the Nobukata-Shikanai Special Prize and 4th Rodin Grand Prize Exhibition, Utsukushi-ga-hari Open Air Museum, Japan, 1992; and American Craft Council Fellow, 1994.

== Death and legacy ==
In 2011, De Staebler died of complications from cancer in Berkeley, California, at the age of 78.

=== 2012 Retrospective ===
From January 14 - April 22, 2012, the Fine Arts Museums of San Francisco presented the first major retrospective of the artist's work at M. H. de Young Memorial Museum. Entitled “Matter + Spirit: Stephen De Staebler,” the exhibition was accompanied by a monograph, "Matter + Spirit: Stephen De Staebler", which included essays by Timothy Anglin Burgard ("Stephen De Staebler: Humanist Sculptor in an Existentialist Age"), Rick Newby, and Dore Ashton, as well as a chronology of the artist's life.

=== Collections ===
The Berkeley Art Museum and Pacific Film Archive, the Crocker Art Museum (Sacramento, California), the Fine Arts Museums of San Francisco, the Honolulu Museum of Art, the Los Angeles County Museum of Art, the Metropolitan Museum of Art (New York), the Montalvo Arts Center (Saratoga, California, Museum of Fine Arts, Boston, the New Orleans Museum of Art, the Oakland Museum of California, the Philbrook Museum of Art (Tulsa, Oklahoma), the San Francisco Museum of Modern Art, the San Jose Museum of Art (San Jose, California), the Smithsonian American Art Museum (Washington DC), and the Udinotti Museum of Figurative Art (Paradise Valley, Arizona) are among the public collections holding work by De Staebler.

== Sources ==
- Adams, Doug, Transcendence with the Human Body in Art: George Segal, Stephen De Staebler, Jasper Johns, and Christo, New York, Crossroad, 1991.
- Burgard, Timothy Anglin, ed., Matter + Spirit: Stephen De Staebler, San Francisco: Fine Arts Museums of San Francisco; Berkeley: University of California Press, 2012 (forthcoming).
- De Staebler, Stephen, Stephen De Staebler, Sculpture, Oakland, CA, Oakland Museum, 1974.
- De Staebler, Stephen, Stephen De Staebler, The Figure, San Francisco, Chronicle Books, 1987.
- Roby, Diane. Internationally Acclaimed Sculptor Stephen De Staebler Has Died at Age 78. Press release retrieved on prweb.com on 20 May 2011.
- New York Times obit.
