= Lesley Vance (artist) =

American painter

- Born: Lesley Vance; 1977; Milwaukee, Wisconsin, U.S.
- Known for: Painting
- Movement: Abstract art

Lesley Vance (born 1977) is an American artist based in Los Angeles.

== Early life and education ==
Vance attended the University of Wisconsin–Madison and California Institute of the Arts.

== Career ==
Vance initially painted still lifes, but is more recently known for her intimately sized improvisational oil paintings. Art in America described her work as "a distinctive sort of illusionistic abstraction, its visual presence a balance between elusive secret and seductive fact". Her work is "rooted in the liquidity of paint and the balletic, improvisational movements of the hand".

== Exhibitions ==
Solo presentations include: Bowdoin College Museum of Art, Brunswick (2012); The FLAG Art Foundation, New York (2012); the Huntington Library, Art Collections (with Ricky Swallow); Botanical Gardens, San Marino (2012), Xavier Hufkens Gallery, Brussels, Belgium (2012, 2014 and 2017). and the David Kordanksy Gallery, Los Angeles (2013).

Vance's work was also included in the 2010 Whitney Biennial, New York Her work can be found in the collection of the Museum of Modern Art, Whitney Museum of American Art, Metropolitan Museum of Art, Los Angeles County Museum of Art and Hammer Museum, among others.
