= Madrid, Nebraska =

- Village
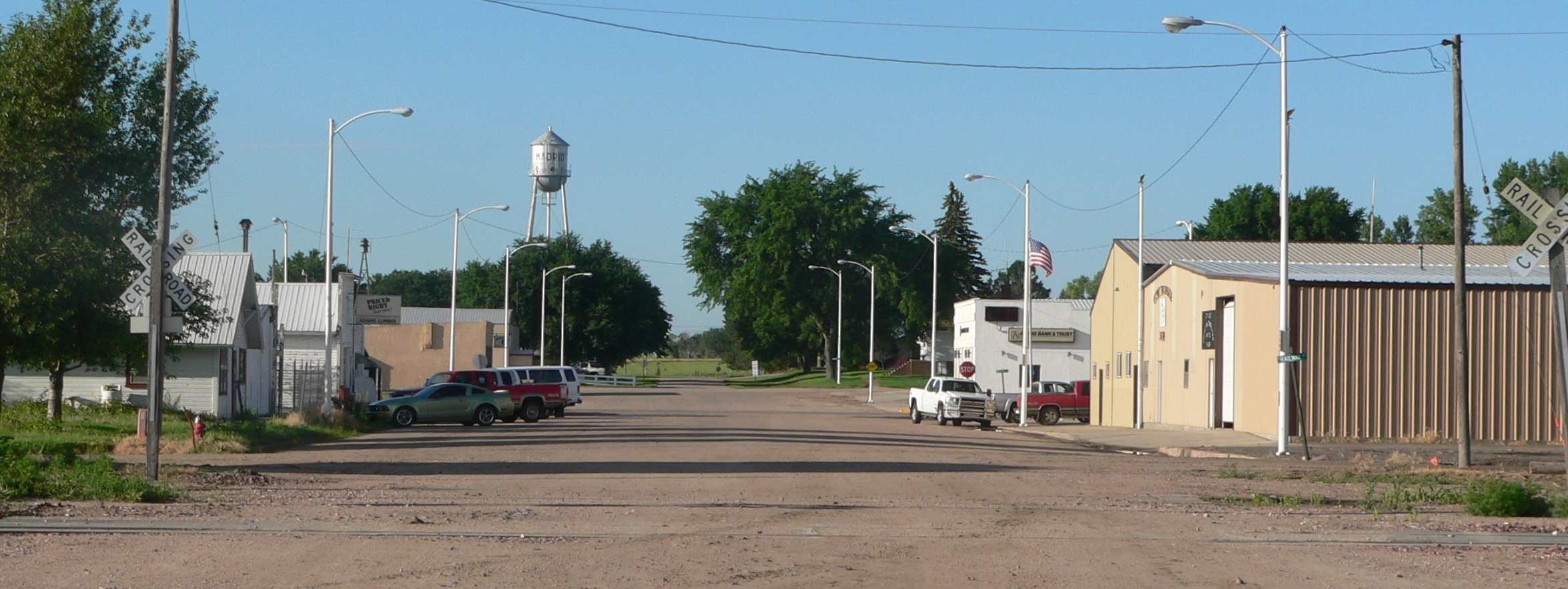
- Downtown Madrid

- Location of Madrid, Nebraska
- Coordinates: 40°51′08″N 101°31′40″W
- Country: United States
- State: Nebraska
- County: Perkins

Area
  - Total: 1.13 sq mi (2.93 km^{2})
  - Land: 1.13 sq mi (2.93 km^{2})
  - Water: 0 sq mi (0.00 km^{2})
- Elevation: 3,281 ft (1,000 m)

Population (2020)
  - Total: 242
  - Density: 213.8/sq mi (82.55/km^{2})
- Time zone: UTC-7 (Mountain (MST))
  - Summer (DST): UTC-6 (MDT)
- ZIP code: 69150
- Area code: 308
- FIPS code: 31-30275
- GNIS feature ID: 2399220
- Website: www.madridnebraska.com

Madrid (/ˈmædrɪd/ ma-drid) is a village in Perkins County, Nebraska, United States. As of the 2020 census, Madrid had a population of 242.

== History ==
Madrid was platted in 1887 when the railroad was extended to that point. It was named after Madrid, the capital of Spain.

== Geography ==
According to the United States Census Bureau, the village has a total area of 1.13 square miles (2.93 km^{2}), all land.

=== Climate ===
Climate data for Madrid, Nebraska (1991–2020 normals, extremes 1900–present)
Month	Jan	Feb	Mar	Apr	May	Jun	Jul	Aug	Sep	Oct	Nov	Dec	Year
Record high °F (°C)	74 (23)	79 (26)	88 (31)	98 (37)	103 (39)	109 (43)	114 (46)	112 (44)	106 (41)	96 (36)	85 (29)	77 (25)	114 (46)
Mean maximum °F (°C)	62.2 (16.8)	66.9 (19.4)	77.2 (25.1)	84.9 (29.4)	91.6 (33.1)	98.5 (36.9)	101.7 (38.7)	98.7 (37.1)	95.6 (35.3)	86.9 (30.5)	73.8 (23.2)	63.1 (17.3)	102.7 (39.3)
Mean daily maximum °F (°C)	39.6 (4.2)	42.5 (5.8)	53.7 (12.1)	61.6 (16.4)	71.7 (22.1)	83.6 (28.7)	89.3 (31.8)	87.3 (30.7)	79.5 (26.4)	65.3 (18.5)	51.2 (10.7)	40.6 (4.8)	63.8 (17.7)
Daily mean °F (°C)	26.6 (−3.0)	29.2 (−1.6)	39.1 (3.9)	47.3 (8.5)	58.5 (14.7)	69.9 (21.1)	75.3 (24.1)	73.0 (22.8)	64.0 (17.8)	50.0 (10.0)	37.1 (2.8)	27.7 (−2.4)	49.8 (9.9)
Mean daily minimum °F (°C)	13.5 (−10.3)	15.9 (−8.9)	24.5 (−4.2)	33.1 (0.6)	45.3 (7.4)	56.1 (13.4)	61.4 (16.3)	58.8 (14.9)	48.6 (9.2)	34.7 (1.5)	22.9 (−5.1)	14.9 (−9.5)	35.8 (2.1)
Mean minimum °F (°C)	−6.5 (−21.4)	−3.4 (−19.7)	6.5 (−14.2)	19.2 (−7.1)	30.5 (−0.8)	44.5 (6.9)	52.8 (11.6)	49.7 (9.8)	35.4 (1.9)	18.4 (−7.6)	5.8 (−14.6)	−2.8 (−19.3)	−12.9 (−24.9)
Record low °F (°C)	−30 (−34)	−29 (−34)	−23 (−31)	−5 (−21)	12 (−11)	32 (0)	39 (4)	30 (−1)	14 (−10)	−1 (−18)	−13 (−25)	−33 (−36)	−33 (−36)
Average precipitation inches (mm)	0.36 (9.1)	0.70 (18)	1.02 (26)	2.04 (52)	3.54 (90)	3.28 (83)	3.64 (92)	2.53 (64)	1.64 (42)	1.77 (45)	0.53 (13)	0.40 (10)	21.45 (545)
Average precipitation days (≥ 0.01 in)	4.1	5.2	6.1	8.1	10.5	8.9	8.7	7.6	6.1	6.3	3.8	3.7	79.1
Source: NOAA

== Demographics ==
Historical population
Census	Pop.	Note	%±
1890	178		—
1900	35		−80.3%
1910	124		254.3%
1920	218		75.8%
1930	449		106.0%
1940	410		−8.7%
1950	379		−7.6%
1960	271		−28.5%
1970	234		−13.7%
1980	284		21.4%
1990	288		1.4%
2000	265		−8.0%
2010	231		−12.8%
2020	242		4.8%
U.S. Decennial Census

=== 2010 census ===
As of the census of 2010, there were 231 people, 96 households, and 63 families residing in the village. The population density was 204.4 inhabitants per square mile (78.9/km^{2}). There were 115 housing units at an average density of 101.8 per square mile (39.3/km^{2}). The racial makeup of the village was 96.5% White and 3.5% from other races. Hispanic or Latino of any race were 7.4% of the population.

There were 96 households, of which 28.1% had children under the age of 18 living with them, 58.3% were married couples living together, 4.2% had a female householder with no husband present, 3.1% had a male householder with no wife present, and 34.4% were non-families. 30.2% of all households were made up of individuals, and 14.6% had someone living alone who was 65 years of age or older. The average household size was 2.41 and the average family size was 3.03.

The median age in the village was 40.8 years. 23.4% of residents were under the age of 18; 13.4% were between the ages of 18 and 24; 18.2% were from 25 to 44; 24.2% were from 45 to 64; and 20.8% were 65 years of age or older. The gender makeup of the village was 51.9% male and 48.1% female.

=== 2000 census ===
As of the census of 2000, there were 265 people, 104 households, and 71 families residing in the village. The population density was 637.9 inhabitants per square mile (246.3/km^{2}). There were 120 housing units at an average density of 288.9 per square mile (111.5/km^{2}). The racial makeup of the village was 97.36% White, 0.38% Native American, 2.26% from other races. Hispanic or Latino of any race were 7.17% of the population.

There were 104 households, out of which 30.8% had children under the age of 18 living with them, 62.5% were married couples living together, 5.8% had a female householder with no husband present, and 31.7% were non-families. 26.9% of all households were made up of individuals, and 9.6% had someone living alone who was 65 years of age or older. The average household size was 2.55 and the average family size was 3.15.

In the village, the population was spread out, with 27.2% under the age of 18, 7.2% from 18 to 24, 22.3% from 25 to 44, 27.9% from 45 to 64, and 15.5% who were 65 years of age or older. The median age was 39 years. For every 100 females, there were 107.0 males. For every 100 females age 18 and over, there were 94.9 males.

As of 2000 the median income for a household in the village was $35,536, and the median income for a family was $42,000. Males had a median income of $30,313 versus $21,964 for females. The per capita income for the village was $15,607. About 5.0% of families and 11.5% of the population were below the poverty line, including 10.1% of those under the age of eighteen and 21.4% of those 65 or over.

== Notable person ==
- John Mason - contemporary American artist
