= Martha Diamond =

American artist and painter (1944–2023)

- Born: May 1, 1944; New York City, U.S.
- Died: December 30, 2023 (aged 79); New York City, U.S.
- Education: Carleton College, Northfield, Minnesota – BA, 1964; New York University – MA, 1969
- Known for: Painting and printmaking
- Website: marthadiamondstudio.net

Martha Bonnie Diamond (May 1, 1944 – December 30, 2023) was an American painter. Her paintings first gained public attention in the 1980s and are included in the permanent collections of the Whitney Museum of American Art, the Museum of Modern Art, New York, and many other institutions.

== Early life and education ==
Martha Bonnie Diamond was born on May 1, 1944, and raised in Stuyvesant Town–Peter Cooper Village, New York. Her father, a doctor, inspired her interest in light, space, and structure in the city while taking her on drives to see his patients. She graduated from Carleton College in Minnesota. in 1964 and returned to New York in 1965 after a year in Paris. She subsequently received an M.A. from New York University in 1969, moved into a loft on the Bowery, and became an active participant in the downtown art and poetry scene.

== Work and career ==
Martha Diamond, Cityscape with Blue Shadow, 1994. Oil on canvas, 96 x 48 inches. Collection Portland Museum of Art. Gift of the Alex Katz Foundation.

Diamond has claimed to be influenced by the New York School. Although known primarily for her expressionistic urban landscapes, she rejected the Neo-Expressionist label that was applied to many painters in the early 1980s. Diamond stated that "I’m more concerned with a vision than expressionism and I try to paint that vision realistically. I try to paint my perceptions rather than paint through emotion" and her work has been described as similar to the capriccios of 18th-century Italy, "Diamond's paintings are a kind of fiction, but one that imparts the character of downtown New York."

The bulk of Diamond's work ranges from such partially abstract cityscapes to pure abstractions, often on a very large scale. Her first solo show was held at Brooke Alexander Gallery in 1976, where she showed work until the 1980s. She was included in the 1989 Whitney Biennial, her cityscapes were described in the catalog for the show as "spectral abstractions of the city, looming in a charged atmosphere enriched by her free color sense." She has had solo exhibitions at the Bowdoin College Museum of Art and the Portland Museum of Art in Maine (1988), at the New York Studio School (2004), among others.

The paintings in her 1988 exhibition at Robert Miller were described in The New York Times as "deceptively simple, full of hidden skills and decisions that only gradually reveal themselves." The same review noted that some of the works looked unfinished—a theme that was repeated by television newscaster Peter Jennings when he visited her loft on the Bowery loft as part of a charity event years later. "I'll ask the rude question," Jennings remarked, "Are they finished?" The Times reported that they were. The New Yorker critic Peter Schjeldahl wrote in 2018, "Diamond romances the town in darting and slashing strokes," her buildings "as zestfully urbane as the perambulatory poems of Frank O’Hara." Reviewing a 2021 exhibition of her paintings from the 1980s at Magenta Plains, Will Heinrich of the Times described them as having "self-contained grandeur and eerie harmony."

Diamond was one of several New York painters who spent time in Maine during the summer months and developed a long-term association with the state. She served on the Board of Governors of the Skowhegan School of Painting and Sculpture in Skowhegan, Maine, from 1982 to 2018. She also taught at Skowhegan beginning in the 1970s, as well as at the School of Visual Arts in New York and at Harvard University. Diamond also supported artistic programming by the International Ladies Garment Workers Union and the Goddard-Riverside Community Center. She died on December 30, 2023 at the age of 79.

== Collections ==
Diamond's paintings and prints are included in the permanent collections of the Whitney Museum of American Art, the Museum of Modern Art, the National Academy of Design, and the Brooklyn Museum in New York; the Museum of Fine Arts, Boston; the Farnsworth Art Museum, the Portland Museum of Art, the Bowdoin College Museum of Art, and the Colby College Museum of Art in Maine; the Art Institute of Chicago; the High Museum of Art in Atlanta; the North Carolina Museum of Art in Raleigh; the Museum of Fine Arts, Houston; and the National Gallery of Australia.

== Recognition ==
In 2001, Diamond received an Academy Award for Art from the American Academy of Arts and Letters, and in 2017 she received an Anonymous Was a Woman Award for painting. She was elected to the National Academy of Design in 2018.

Her first solo exhibition in Europe was opened in September 2026 in Sara Hildén Art Museum, Tampere Finland.

== Art market ==
Diamond established the Martha Diamond Trust in 2020, which has since been working on a catalogue raisonné.

Diamond has been represented by David Kordansky Gallery since 2023. She previously showed with Brooke Alexander Gallery (1976–85) and Robert Miller (1985–94).
