= Daniel Heidkamp =

American painter

- Born: 1980 (age 45–46); Wakefield, Massachusetts
- Known for: Painting

Daniel Heidkamp (born 1980) is an American figurative painter.

== Education ==
Heidkamp received his BFA from School of the Museum of Fine Arts, Boston, MA, and his MFA from Tufts University, Medford, MA in 2003. In 2001, Heidkamp was enrolled in the International Exchange Program at the University of Westminster, London, England.

== Work ==
Daniel Heidkamp was born in Wakefield, Massachusetts in 1980. Heidkamp is an American contemporary figurative painter. Painter Daniel Heidkamp follows in the traditions of Edward Hopper, David Hockney, and Peter Doig. His subject matter ranges from woodland scenes from his native New England, to Brooklyn interiors, to brightly colored semi-abstract landscapes, as exemplified by his Bounce House series. The artist begins by sourcing images and then reworking them in al fresco and studio studies before creating his canvases with thickly built impasto adding detail to his oil compositions. “My source material comes from 'on-the-spot' painting,” Heidkamp has explained. “I sit outside with my canvas on the ground and try to capture moments when the ordinary world appears entirely otherworldly.” Heidkamp's work will be included in a group exhibition at the Metropolitan Museum of Art in New York in June 2017. Heidkamp lives and works in Brooklyn, New York City, New York.

== Exhibitions ==
=== Solo exhibitions ===
- Wavelength, LOYAL, Stockholm, Sweden, 2018
- Jaws Dropping, The Journal Gallery, New York, NY, 2016
- New York, New Work, Half Gallery, New York, NY, 2016
- Pump The Peninsula, LOYAL, Stockholm, Sweden, 2016
- Daniel Heidkamp, Pace Prints, New York, NY, 2015
- Barbizon Beauty School, Half Gallery, New York, NY, 2015
- Daniel Heidkamp, White Columns, New York, NY, 2014
- Trapped Under Nice, LaMontagne Gallery, Boston, MA, 2011
- The Arrangement, LaMontagne Gallery, Boston, MA, 2009
- Daniel Heidkamp, BUIA Gallery, New York, NY, 2008

=== Selected group exhibitions ===
- Jane Freilicher, Mira Dancy, Daniel Heidkamp, Derek Eller Gallery, New York City, New York, 2017
- FIGURATIVELY: Jane Corrigan, Daniel Heidkamp, Ella Kruglyanskaya, Aliza Nisenbaum, and Daniel Rios Rodriguez, Curated by Matthew Higgs, Wilkinson Gallery, London, UK, 2015
- The Guston Effect, Steven Zevitas Gallery, Boston, MA, 2015
- 20 X 16, Morgan Lehman Gallery, New York, NY, 2015
- SPEARS, LOYAL, Stockholm, Sweden
- Let's Talk Postmodernity, Robert Blumenthal Gallery, New York, NY, 2015
- Eagles II, Marlborough Madrid, Madrid, Spain, 2015
- Ticket to Reality: Daniel Heidkamp, Alice Neel, Henry Taylor, Bob Thompson, Marlborough Chelsea, New York, NY, 2015
- The Great Figure: Daniel Heidkamp, Lily Ludlow, Keith Mayerson, Dana Schutz, Henry Taylor, and Torey Thornton, The Journal Gallery, New York, NY, 2014
- Some Thoughts About Marks: Theodora Allen Patrick Berran Daniel Heidkamp Michael Hunter Lui Shtini, Jack Hanley Gallery - New York, New York, NY, 2014
- Don't Look Now, curated by Jesse Greenberg and MacGregor Harp, Zach Feuer Gallery, New York, NY, 2014
- Draw Gym, 247365, New York, NY Suddenness + Certainty, Robert Miller Gallery, New York, NY, 2013
- Woods, Lovely, Dark, And Deep, DC Moore Gallery, New York, NY, 2013
- Conveniently Located, 247365, New York, NY, 2013
- Disquietude, Geoffrey Young Gallery, Great Barrington, MA, 2012
- DNA Summer Artists' Residency Exhibition, 2012
- DNA Gallery, Provincetown, MA, 2012
- The Double Dirty Dozen (& Friends), Freight + Volume, New York, NY, 2012
- Epiphanic Glow, Geoffrey Young Gallery, Great Barrington, MA New York, 2012
- – New Tendencies, Marianne Friis Gallery, Copenhagen Mie: A Portrait By 35 Artists, Freight + Volume, New York, NY, 2012
- Paper A - Z, Sue Scott Gallery, New York, NY, 2011
- Last Thursday, LaMontagne Gallery, Boston, MA, 2010
- A Lettuce Slaughter in the Woods, Real Fine Arts, New York, NY, 2010
- Small Oil Paintings, Galerie Mikael Andersen - Berlin, Germany, 2010
- Big Picture, Priska C. Juschka Fine Art, New York, NY, 2010
- Behind The Green Door, DNA Gallery, Provincetown, MA, 2010
- The Irascible Assholes, Gallery poulsen Contemporary Fine Arts, Copenhagen, DK, 2010
- Three Painters, BUIA Gallery, New York, NY, 2009
- In Your Face, BUIA Gallery, New York, NY, 2008
- Cusp, DNA Gallery, Provincetown, MA, 2008
- ambivalent figuration; people, Samson Projects, Boston, MA, 2008
