= Adam Linder =

Australian choregrapher (born 1983)

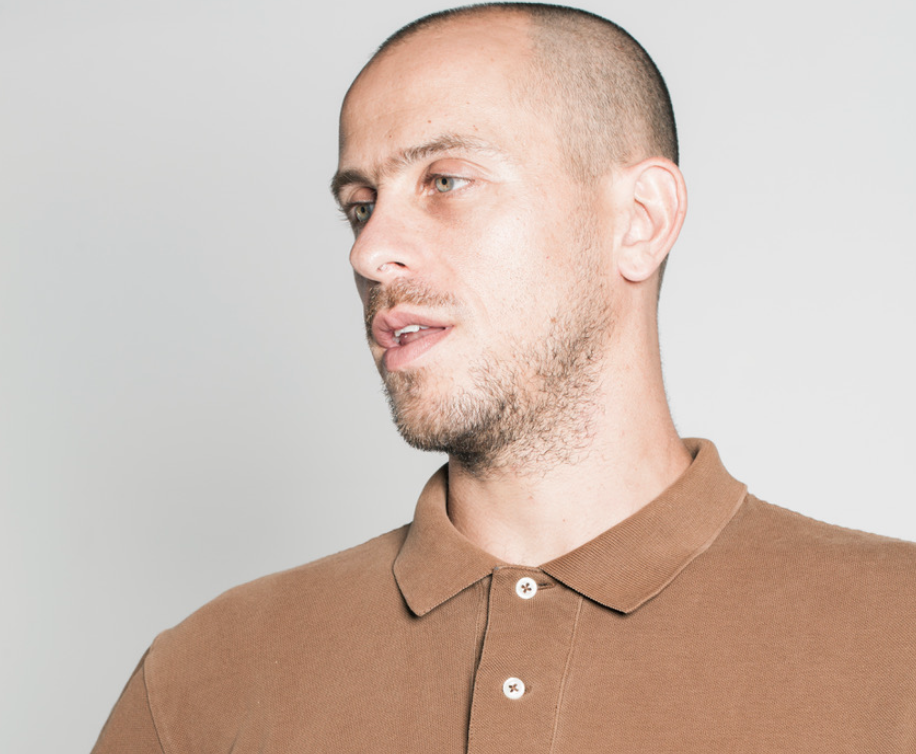
- Born: 1983 (age 41–42); Sydney, Australia
- Occupations: Dancer, choreographer
- Years active: 2002–present
- Notable work: Choreographic Services (2013–2017), The Want, Loyalty, Drip Tekhne
- Awards: Place Prize (2008), Mohn Prize (2016)
- Website: AdamLinder.org

Adam Linder (born 1983 in Sydney, Australia) is a contemporary dancer and choreographer. He received the Mohn Award in 2016.

== Early life and dance education ==
Linder trained at the Royal Ballet School in London. After completing his training in 2002, he danced with The Royal Ballet. He later joined the Michael Clark Company and Meg Stuart's Damaged Goods Company, with whom he performed for several years.

== Career ==
Linder began presenting his independent choreographic works in 2013. One of his first stage work was titled Parade and was premiered at Hebbel am Ufer in Berlin. That same year, he initiated a series of performances called Choreographic Services (2013–2017). The first in this series, Some Cleaning (2013), reinterpreted cleaning gestures into a sequence of choreographed movements. The series concluded in 2017 with Service No.5: Dare to Keep Kids Off Naturalism, presented at the Kunsthalle Basel.

In 2018, during his residency at Callie's in Berlin, Linder developed The WANT. This piece explores desire through an interaction between a client and a dealer, inspired by Bernard-Marie Koltès's play In the Solitude of Cotton Fields.

Adam Linder has also created a work called Shelf Life, commissioned by the MoMA in 2020, in which 6 dancers, in conjunction with Shahryar Nashat’s Force Life, perform to reframe the ways in which visitors see and experience performance in a museum.

Commissioned by the Museum of Contemporary Art Australia, Linder created Hustle Harder in 2023, in which a rotating troupe of nine dancers navigates mobile partitions during the museum's opening hours, employs what Linder himself calls his “virtuosic angling” movement vocabulary to interrogate the production and dissemination of dance imagery in a gallery context.

Other works include LOYALTY (2021), Acid Gems (2023) from an institutional partnership with Ballet de Lorraine and Drip Tekhne (2024), a recent production for the Danish Dance Theatre.

Linder's practice spans different formats, creating staged works for the theatre and durational performances for exhibition spaces.

== Exhibitions and awards ==
In September 2008, Linder received The Place Prize in his duo with Lorena Randi for the work Foie Gras.

Linder's works have been presented at the Kampnagel theater in Hamburg, the Schinkel Pavillon and the Institute of Contemporary Arts in London. He participated in the 20th Sydney Biennale (2016) and the Liverpool Biennial (2016). In 2016, during the Made in LA exhibition at the Hammer Museum in Los Angeles, he received the Mohn Prize for Artistic Excellence for the work Kein Paradiso, accompanied by the publication of a monograph on his stage works titled Who Is Surfing Who.
