= David Kordansky Gallery =

Art gallery in California and New York, US

Coordinates: 34.0543°N 118.3431°W

David Kordansky Gallery is an art gallery established in Los Angeles's Chinatown neighborhood in 2003.

== History ==
The gallery was founded by David Kordansky, a former conceptual and performance artist, in a space on Bernard Street in L.A.’s Chinatown neighborhood. In 2008, the gallery opened its main location in Culver City and, in 2014, expanded to Los Angeles's Mid-City district where it tripled its size to more than 20,000 square feet. The space was designed by architecture firm WHY and includes two large galleries as well as offices, a library and gardens.

In 2022, the gallery opened a new space in New York City.

David Kordansky Gallery has responded publicly to the Black Lives Matter movement and represents artists from diverse backgrounds.

== Artists ==
David Kordansky Gallery represents living artists, including:

- Huma Bhabha (since 2018)
- Lucy Bull (since 2021)
- Aaron Curry
- Fred Eversley (since 2018)
- Derek Fordjour (since 2021)
- Guan Xiao (since 2022)
- Raul Guerrero
- Jenna Gribbon (since 2022)
- Lauren Halsey (since 2018)
- Shara Hughes (since 2023)
- Rashid Johnson
- Tala Madani
- Sam McKinniss (since 2023)
- Odili Donald Odita (since 2022)
- Maia Cruz Palileo (since 2024)
- Hilary Pecis (since 2021)
- Adam Pendleton (since 2020)
- Mai-Thu Perret
- Linda Stark (since 2019)
- Richard Tuttle
- Mary Weatherford
- Jonas Wood (since 2011)
- Lesley Vance (since 2003)

In addition, the gallery manages various artist estates, including:

- Francisco (Chico) da Silva
- Martha Diamond (since 2023)
- Sam Gilliam (since 2019)
- Tom of Finland
- John Wesley
- Betty Woodman

In the past, the gallery has worked with the following artists and estates:

- Harold Ancart
- Elad Lassry
- Simone Leigh (2019)
