= Mary Weatherford =

American painter

- Born: 1963 (age 62–63); Ojai, California
- Education: Princeton University (B.A., 1984); Bard College (M.F.A., 2006)
- Occupation: Visual artist
- Known for: Abstract paintings

Mary Weatherford (born 1963) is a Los Angeles–based painter. She is known for her large abstract paintings incorporating neon lighting tubes. Her work is featured in museums and galleries including the Hirshhorn Museum and Sculpture Garden, Brooklyn Museum, Museum of Modern Art, and the High Museum of Art. Weatherford's solo exhibitions include Mary Weatherford: From the Mountain to the Sea at Claremont McKenna College, I've Seen Gray Whales Go By at Gagosian West, and Like The Land Loves the Sea at David Kordansky Gallery, Los Angeles. Her work has been part of group exhibitions at the Museum of Modern Art and the Rose Art Museum at Brandeis University.

== Early life ==
Weatherford was born in Ojai, California, and raised in Los Angeles. She studied visual arts and art history at Princeton University, graduating in 1984. After graduation, she lived and worked in New York where in 1985 she was a Helena Rubinstein Fellow in the Independent Study Program of the Whitney Museum of American Art. She returned to Southern California in 1999 and later received an M.F.A. from the Milton Avery Graduate School of the Arts at Bard College.

== Career ==
Early in her career she also collaborated with her late sister, the writer Margaret Weatherford, on performance art and worked as a bookkeeper for the artist Mike Kelley.A career breakthrough came in 2012 with Weatherford's Bakersfield Project exhibition at the Todd Madigan Gallery at California State University at Bakersfield where she was an artist in residence. The Bakersfield paintings marked the first time she incorporated illuminated neon light tubes into her abstract paintings. The series was inspired by the colourful neon signs she saw on old restaurant and factory buildings while driving around Bakersfield.

Weatherford used neon in the Bakersfield Project and later series of paintings, such as Manhattan (2013), Los Angeles (2014) and Train Yard (2016–2020) to recreate the sensations of specific places or moments. In an interview for Gagosian Quarterly she once said, ‘I try to depict or deliver not only a visual translation of a place in time, but with that, the scent, the sound, and the feeling. Is it chilly? Is it hot? Is there a clanging sound?’

Her work was included in the exhibitions Variations: Conversations in and Around Abstract Painting at the Los Angeles County Museum of Art and The Forever Now: Contemporary Painting in an Atemporal World at the Museum of Modern Art in New York in 2014. That same year she received the $25,000 Artist Award from the Artists' Legacy Foundation founded by Viola Frey. Examples of Weatherford's abstract paintings incorporating neon lights are held by the Museum of Modern Art, the Hirshhorn Museum, and the Hammer Museum. Another of her neon paintings, Past Sunset (2015), was shown at the National Museum of Women in the Arts in the 2016 exhibition NO MAN'S LAND: Women Artists from the Rubell Family Collection. Three examples of her early work combining acrylic, ink and screen print are held by the Brooklyn Museum: Madame Butterfly (1989), Violetta (1991), and First Riddle (1991).

In 2016, Mary Weatherford joined The Metropolitan Museum of Art's The Artist Project, where contemporary artists engage online with The Met's historical collections connecting contemporary art with artistic traditions across different eras.

An exhibition of works inspired by Titian’s “The Flaying of Marsyas” at Museo di Palazzo Grimani opened in Venice during the 2022 Venice Biennale. In 2023, David Kordansky Gallery presented abstract paintings by Weatherford at Frieze Seoul.

Her work was included in the 2024 exhibition Making Their Mark: Works from the Shah Garg Collection at the Berkeley Art Museum and Pacific Film Archive (BAMPFA).
