= Magdalena Suarez Frimkess =

Venezuelan artist (born 1929)

Magdalena Suarez Frimkess (born 1929) is a Venezuelan artist who works in ceramics. She is best known for her sculptures of cartoon characters and advertisement artworks.

Suarez Frimkess is represented by kaufmann repetto Milan / New York.

== Early life and education ==
Suarez was sent to an orphanage at the age of seven after losing her mother to tuberculosis, as her father was not able to provide financial stability. While at the orphanage in Caracas, she discovered a love for painting. She received her education at the School of the Plastic Arts where they encouraged her to have a career in painting. When she was eighteen years old, she met her first partner, a married man who was separated from his wife. They moved to Chile, where they had two children. After taking some time off to take care of the children, she attended Catholic University in Santiago, Chile, where she studied sculpture and painting.

After Chile, she was offered a fellowship to the Clay Art Center in New York, NY where she met her husband Michael Frimkess, a ceramicist and artist. The couple moved to Venice, California to collaborate and work together in their studio.

== Art ==
Suarez creates sculpture-like cartoon characters, vases, and mugs that often involve slogans and advertisements. One of her most famous works is of Popeye, Mickey and Minnie Mouse, and other Disney characters. Most of Suarez's work is small-scale. Suarez's works were often viewed as unconventional during her time in ceramic school, as they were decorative rather than functional. She also uses Aztec and Mayan imagery in her work.

Suarez and Frimkess occasionally worked together in the 1960s. After Frimkess was diagnosed with multiple sclerosis in 1971, they began working together more closely. Frimkess throws the pottery and Suarez paints it. They have had exhibitions together, including at the Hammer Museum. An early significant joint show took place from 2000-2001 at Louis Stern Fine Arts in West Hollywood, California. Suarez had her first solo exhibition in 2013 when she was 84 years old at South Willard gallery in Los Angeles, California. Her first solo show in New York was at White Columns in 2014; The New Yorker described her works in it as "delightfully curious ... nonchalantly constructed, beautifully glazed".

In August of 2024, LACMA held its first exhibition featuring Magdalena entitled “Magdalena Suárez Frimkess, The Finest Disregard” at the Resnikoff Pavilion. Billed as a career retrospective, the exhibition featured Magdalena’s lifetime of artistic expression, including sketches, drawings, hand-painted sculptures, tiles and vessels, as well as some of her collaborative work with her husband Michael, who subsequently passed away in February 2025.

As of January 2026, at the age of 97, Magdalena Suárez Frimkess moved out of her home studio in Venice, CA, but she continues to create and produce celebrated works of art.

== Exhibitions ==
- Louis Stern Fine Arts, West Hollywood: Vessels of Satire: The Art of Magdalena and Michael Frimkess, 2000–2001
- South Willard gallery, Los Angeles:
  - Magdalena Suarez Frimkess, 2013
  - Magdalena Suarez Frimkess: New York, 2018
  - Magdalena Suarez Frimkess: Stoneware and Drawings, 2020
  - Magdalena Suarez Frimkess: 90, 2021
- David Kordansky Gallery, Los Angeles: Grapevine ~, 2013
- White Columns gallery, New York City:
  - The Cat Show, 2013
  - Project Room: Magdalena Suarez Frimkess, 2014
  - Looking Back, 2015
- The Hammer Museum, Los Angeles: Magdalena Suarez Frimkess and Michael Frimkess: Made In L.A., 2014
- The Nevica Project gallery, Chicago and Kansas City: The Frimkess Collection, 2016-2017
- kaufmann repetto gallery, Milan / New York:
  - Magdalena Suarez Frimkess, Milan, 2016
  - Magdalena Suarez Frimkess, New York, 2017
  - The world is my menu, New York, 2022
  - NoW girls allowed, New York, 2024
- Los Angeles County Museum of Art, Resnikoff Pavilion: Magdalena Frimkess, The Finest Disregard, August 2024- January 2025

== Website ==
Magdalena Suarez Frimkess
