= Stan Bitters =

American ceramics sculptor

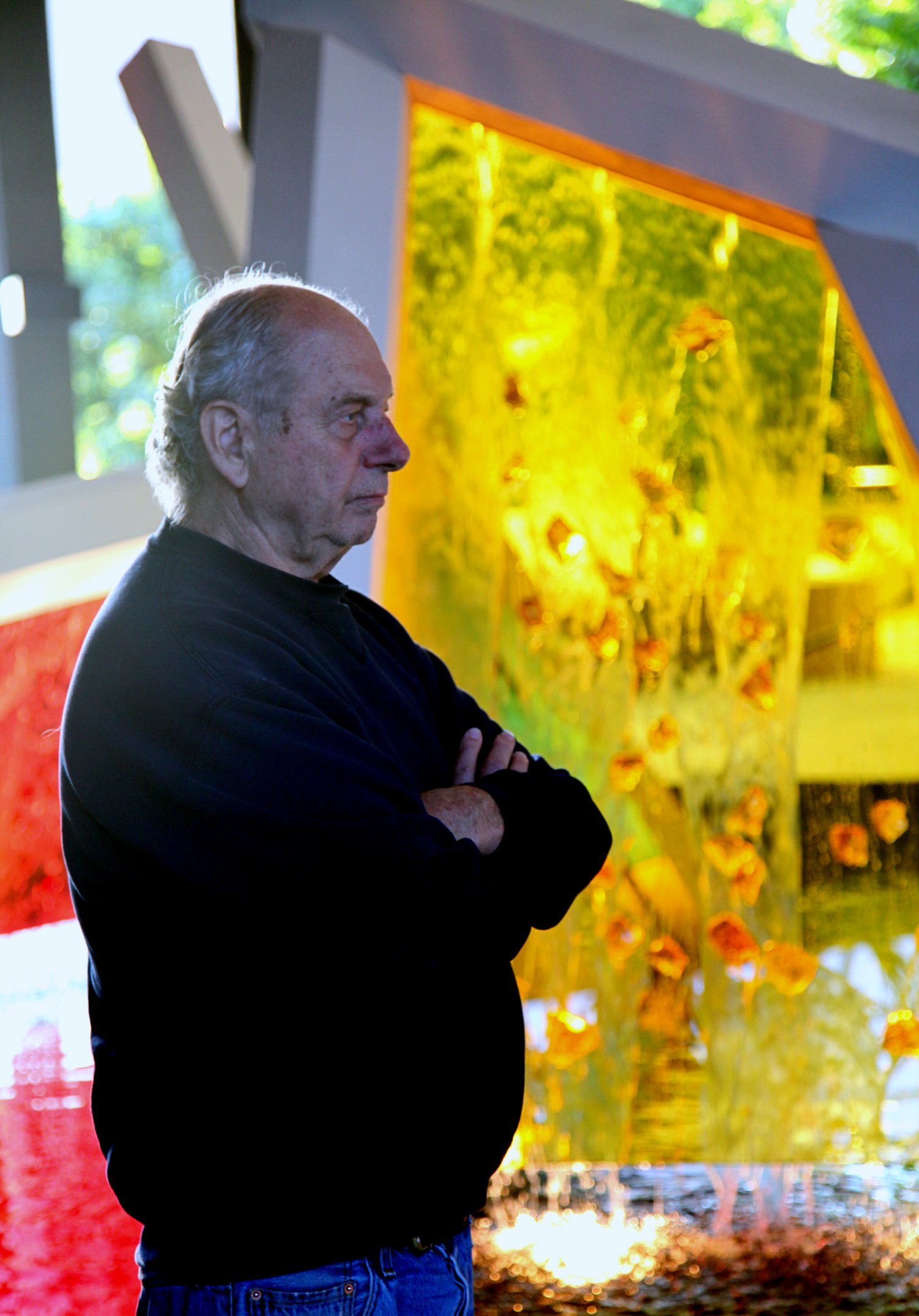
- Stan Bitters in 2012
- Education: University of California Los Angeles; Otis College of Art and Design
- Known for: Ceramics sculptor
- Movement: Organic modernism
- Website: Official website

Stan Bitters is an American ceramics sculptor whose work was instrumental in shaping the organic modernist movement in the 1960s. His work has achieved international recognition and is a staple in many modern design and art shows, and has been featured in the prestigious California Design series and at the Craft and Folk Art Museum as part of Pacific Standard Time: Art in L.A. 1945–1980.

His career in ceramics has spanned six decades. His large scale works include ceramic wall murals, sculptures, fountains, and garden pathways. These installations have been featured in several design publications, and can still be experienced in public spaces, banks, hotels, schools, churches, industrial complexes, and private residences. His influence has been present in California architecture since the 1960s.

Bitters received his Bachelor of Arts degree in painting from University of California Los Angeles in 1959. He also attended the Otis College of Art and Design in Los Angeles where he studied under Peter Voulkos. In 1959 he went to work for Hans Sumpf, an adobe brick manufacturer in Madera, California that perfected the process of manufacturing emulsified adobe bricks. Bitters was the company’s resident artist hired to create pottery and other ceramic art. While at Hans Sumpf, Bitters created architectural murals, tiles, bird houses, planters and sculptural objects – designs that would earn him recognition later on as a pioneer of the organic modernist craft movement. He left the company in 1965.

== Birdhouses ==
Stan Bitters vintage birdhouses.

These porous, lowfire clay pieces have a direct connection to Peter Voulkos. By his own account, Bitters said that while a student at Otis, he chanced upon Voulkos sitting in his studio and then proceeded to ask him how to throw a sphere on a potter’s wheel. Bitters took this knowledge with him when he later joined Hans Sumpf and produce birdhouses.

== Elevating pots and planters to art ==
Bitters is also known for his thumb pots. He has raised what was once humble, decorative and functional into objects of art by applying all the elements of formal art. Bitters’ pots and planters are distinctively earthy and textural and it is easy to overlook at texture, while a hallmark of his work, “is only one of the elements,” according to Bitters. “The surface of the container must be treated in attitude like a painting involving the variation of a theme, thick and thin line, color, relationships of form, scale, proportion, calligraphy, texture, and finally, the organization of all these elements into a single statement. All the elements of formal art may be found in pots” (Bitters 1976, p. 48).

== Organic sculpture ==
In his book Environmental Ceramics, Bitters says that “Clay assumes powerful form in sculpture. Because of its responsive nature and its receptivity to impressions, clay is open to tremendous variety of sculptural approaches, and can be worked additively and subtractively with equal ease. Its visual mass gives it an earthy, weighty character in contrast to the liquid nature of glass or the linear character of welded steel in which a massive piece may appear to be much lighter than it is. The immediacy with which clay can be worked gives the sculpture great energy. Clay accepts and emits emotional power” (Bitters 1976, p. 77).

== Murals ==
The scope of ceramics covers more than just pottery. Technically, clay that has been fired in a kiln is considered ceramic. As such, brick, mosaic, and tile fall all under this category. Perhaps no other artist has been as prolific as Bitters in the creation of monumental ceramic wall murals. His architectural installations adorn many commercial and residential buildings in California, such as the 22-foot tall indoor ceramic fountain environment inside the Stanislaus County Administrative Building, Modesto, California. and a group of two-story fireplaces at the Ace Hotel in Palm Springs, California.

== Environmental ceramics ==
Throughout his career, Bitters has steadfastly expressed the important role of sculpture in urban environment. He believes in integration of art and architecture – a notion foreign to contemporary urban development. (The union of these two fields was never in question in the early days of Greece and Rome and through the Middle Ages.)

This disjunction is attributed to a lack of trust. In the book Walls: Enrichment and Ornamenation, which features Bitters’ ceramic wall murals, David Van Dommelen says that “the architect had a tendency to be afraid of the artist and the craftsman. The architect wanted to remain an entity to himself; he feared a lack of understanding on the part of the craftsman and artist; and he suspected that they would not wish to remain anonymous as they had in past years” (Van Dommelen 1965, p. 41).

Urban developers often overlook the enriching possibilities of public art. For Bitters architecture should consider the human impact because the environment created by a building affects the people who see and use it. Public sculpture is a way to humanize an urban environment. “You just have to think about people, not just buildings,” he believes.

== Recent resurgence ==
Stan Bitters thumb pot, 29 X 17 inches.

While Bitters’ work has always been commissioned by architects and designers, his work has recently found favor in the art and design community of Los Angeles, where mid-century modern has once again, as it did throughout the 1950s and 1960s, gained popularity and currency.

== Books ==
- Bitters, Stan (1976). Environmental Ceramics. University of Michigan: Van Nostrand Reinhold Co. ISBN 978-0442207816.
