= Lucy Bull =

American abstract painter (born 1990)

- Born: 1990 (age 35–36); New York City, New York, U.S.
- Education: Rhode Island School of Design (attended); School of the Art Institute of Chicago, BFA, 2012
- Known for: Painting
- Movement: Abstraction
- Website: lucybull.com

Lucy Bull (born 1990) is an American abstract painter based in Los Angeles and New York. She is known for large-scale paintings that employ a variety of procedural strategies and bold colors to produce complex textural compositions. Her work is held in the permanent collections of major institutions including the Hirshhorn Museum and Sculpture Garden, Los Angeles County Museum of Art, and the Museum of Contemporary Art, Los Angeles, among others.

== Early life and education ==
Bull was born in 1990 in New York. Both of her parents are artists. Her mother is a painter and multimedia artist. When Bull and her twin sister were growing up, she designed textiles. Her father is a documentary filmmaker and former teaching assistant to Manny Farber, a painter and theorist.

She initially attended the Rhode Island School of Design before transferring in 2010 to the School of the Art Institute of Chicago, where she earned a BFA in 2012. In Chicago, she developed an interest in curatorial practice, organizing her first exhibition project—a group show staged at a dim sum restaurant, organized around a lazy susan—while taking a class with artist Joseph Grigely based on his book Exhibition Prosthetics. After college she moved briefly to New York before relocating to Los Angeles, where she has been based since.

== Career ==
Bull began exhibiting in Los Angeles as part of the city's independent gallery scene. In her words, this was when "things started to click". Her first exhibition, Queens Way (2017), was staged at the RMS Queen Mary in Long Beach, California, presented by the art-run platform Mother Culture.

In 2018, Bull founded From the Desk of Lucy Bull, a table-top exhibition space she operated from her East Hollywood apartment. The project grew out of a period when a hand injury prevented her from painting; she invited artists to present small exhibitions on and around a six-foot steel desk. Artists who have presented projects through the series include Ficus Interfaith, Loren Kramar, Elizabeth Englander, Lauren Quin, Mathis Altmann, Isabelle Frances McGuire, Michael Bala, and Alexandra Metcalf. The Desk has also hosted performance evenings, dinner gatherings, and group exhibitions, and has appeared in other contexts, including a presentation at the Los Angeles Art Book Fair and three editions of From the Xmas Tree of Lucy Bull. The project later relocated to the East Village in New York City, where it remains active.

In 2019, Bull had her first solo exhibitions concurrently at Smart Objects and the artist-run project space Queens, both in Los Angeles. The same year she presented The Damage at Human Resources in Los Angeles, a painted lightbox installed on the facade of the building, accompanied by a 24-hour movie marathon. Bull went on to show with the gallery High Art, first in Paris in 2019 and again in Arles in 2020. It was during this time that her work became known to a wider audience.

Bull joined David Kordansky Gallery and had her first exhibition with the gallery, Skunk Grove, in Los Angeles in 2021, followed by Piper in 2022 at Kordansky's New York location, and Ash Tree in 2024. In conjunction with Ash Tree, Bull curated a 24-hour marathon film screening at Lumiere Cinema in Los Angeles, her second such marathon after the 2019 screening at Human Resources. In 2023, she was the subject of solo presentations at The Warehouse in Dallas and the Long Museum West Bund in Shanghai.

Her first U.S. museum solo exhibition, The Garden of Forking Paths, was presented at the Institute of Contemporary Art, Miami from December 2024 through March 2025, comprising sixteen paintings made between 2019 and 2024 and organized by curator Gean Moreno. In parallel, the museum commissioned a 39-foot painting for its three-story stairwell, which debuted alongside the exhibition and remained on view through September 2025, beyond the run of the show.

== Artistic practice ==
Bull works primarily in oil on linen. Her paintings are characterized by densely layered, gestural compositions built up through repeated applications of paint. Her process involves using brushes in unconventional ways, including dabbing, stabbing, twisting, and scraping. Bull has described the scratching in her process as a form of excavation in which older marks from beginning layers are pulled to the foreground, acting as a relief as subsequent layers are built up. The result has been described in synesthetic terms—evoking sonic or tactile sensations as much as visual ones. She has invoked the late British painter Howard Hodgkin to describe her approach, noting: "I am a representational painter, but not a painter of appearances. I paint representational pictures of emotional situations."

Her work engages themes of perception, consciousness, projection, and the limits of cognition, with many paintings evoking altered or dream-like psychological states. Critics have noted the paintings' resistance to fixed interpretation, and Bull has described them as functioning like Rorschach inkblots in which the viewer's response reveals as much about their own psychology as about the work. Elsewhere Bull has stated "I want to titillate the senses. I want to draw people closer. I think people aren’t used to paying much-prolonged attention to paintings on walls and I want to allow people to have more of a sensory experience. I want to draw them in so that there is the opportunity for things to open up and for them to wander."

== Selected exhibitions ==
=== Solo and two-person exhibitions ===
- 2024–2025: The Garden of Forking Paths, Institute of Contemporary Art, Miami, FL
- 2024: Ash Tree, David Kordansky Gallery, Los Angeles, CA
- 2023: Nacar, The Warehouse, Dallas, TX
- 2023: Venus World, Long Museum West Bund, Shanghai, China
- 2022: Piper, David Kordansky Gallery, New York, NY
- 2022: Lucy & Fengyi (with Guo Fengyi), Pond Society, Shanghai, China
- 2021: Skunk Grove, David Kordansky Gallery, Los Angeles, CA
- 2020: Sisper, High Art, Arles, France
- 2019: The Damage, Human Resources, Los Angeles, CA
- 2019: Loofah, Queens, Los Angeles, CA
- 2019: Squall, Smart Objects, Los Angeles, CA
- 2019: First Meetings, High Art, Paris, France
- 2017: Queens Way, RMS Queen Mary, Mother Culture, Long Beach, CA

=== Selected group exhibitions ===
- 2026: Held in Layers: Selections from PAMM's Collection, Pérez Art Museum Miami
- 2026: Skins, Fundación MEDIANOCHE0, Granda, Spain
- 2026: Abstraction, Continued: Recent Paintings from the Speed Art Museum Collection, Speed Art Museum, Louisville, KY
- 2026: Echoes of Her Century: A Global Exhibition of Women's Art, Long Museum, West Bund, Shanghai, China
- 2026: SIZZLER, Los Angeles, CA
- 2025: A Certain Form of Hell, Karma Gallery, Thomaston, ME
- 2025: Abstraction (re)creation: 20 under 40, X Museum, Beijing, China
- 2024: How Do We Know the World?, Baltimore Museum of Art, Baltimore, MD
- 2024: Abstraction (re)creation – 20 under 40, Le Consortium, Dijon, France
- 2023: NGV Triennial, National Gallery of Victoria, Melbourne, Australia
- 2023: He Said/She Said: Contemporary Women Artists Interject, Dallas Museum of Art, TX
- 2022: 13 Women: Variation I, Orange County Museum of Art, Costa Mesa, CA
- 2022: Artists Inspired by Music: Interscope Reimagined, Los Angeles County Museum of Art, CA
- 2021: Abstract Vocabularies: Selections from the Collection, Museum of Contemporary Art San Diego, CA
- 2021: Present Generations: Creating the Scantland Collection, Columbus Museum of Art, Columbus, OH
- 2020: Life Still, CLEARING, New York, NY
- 2020: I Want to Eat the Sunset. We're Talking About the Cosmos, Even. And Love, I Guess, Almine Rech, New York, NY
- 2020: El oro de los tigres, Air de Paris, Romainville, France

=== Art fair presentations ===
- 2019: NADA Miami (solo presentation, Smart Objects), Miami, FL
- 2019: Art Basel Miami Beach (High Art), Miami Beach, FL
- 2021: Frieze London (solo presentation, David Kordansky Gallery), London, UK
- 2021: Art Basel Miami Beach (two-person presentation with Kentaro Kawabata, High Art), Miami Beach, FL
- 2022: Art Basel Miami Beach (David Kordansky Gallery), Miami Beach, FL
- 2023: Paris+ par Art Basel (David Kordansky Gallery), Paris, France
- 2023: Art Basel Miami Beach (David Kordansky Gallery), Miami Beach, FL
- 2024: Art Basel Hong Kong (David Kordansky Gallery), Hong Kong
- 2024: Art Basel Paris (David Kordansky Gallery), Paris, France
- 2024: Art Basel Miami Beach (David Kordansky Gallery), Miami Beach, FL
- 2025: Art Basel Hong Kong (David Kordansky Gallery), Hong Kong
- 2025: Art Basel (David Kordansky Gallery), Basel, Switzerland
- 2025: Art Basel Paris (David Kordansky Gallery), Paris, France
- 2025: Art Basel Miami Beach (David Kordansky Gallery), Miami Beach, FL
- 2026: Art Basel Qatar (solo presentation, David Kordansky Gallery), Doha, Qatar
- 2026: Art Basel Hong Kong (David Kordansky Gallery), Hong Kong
- 2026: Art Basel (David Kordansky Gallery), Basel, Switzerland

== Public collections ==
Bull's work is held in the permanent collections of the following institutions:

- Albertina Museum, Vienna, Austria
- Baltimore Museum of Art, Baltimore, MD
- Dallas Museum of Art, Dallas, TX
- Hirshhorn Museum and Sculpture Garden, Washington, D.C.
- Institute of Contemporary Art, Miami, Miami, FL
- Los Angeles County Museum of Art, Los Angeles, CA
- Long Museum West Bund, Shanghai, China
- MAMCO (Musée d'art moderne et contemporain), Geneva, Switzerland
- Museum of Contemporary Art, Los Angeles, Los Angeles, CA
- Museum of Contemporary Art San Diego, San Diego, CA
- Pérez Art Museum Miami, Miami, FL
- Rose Art Museum, Brandeis University, Waltham, MA
- Speed Art Museum, Louisville, KY

== Publications ==
- Lucy Bull: Selected Works 2019–2022. David Kordansky Gallery. 2022.
- Plume. Onestar Press. 2017.
