= Lui Shtini =

Albanian painter

Lui Shtini (born 1978 in Kavajë, Albania) is an artist, currently living and working in New York. He received his BFA in 2000 from the Academy of Arts in Tirana. Since his move to New York, he has attended Skowhegan School of Painting and Sculpture, and was the recipient of a New York Foundation for the Arts Fellowship in painting in 2010.
