= Hammer Museum =

Art museum in California, United States

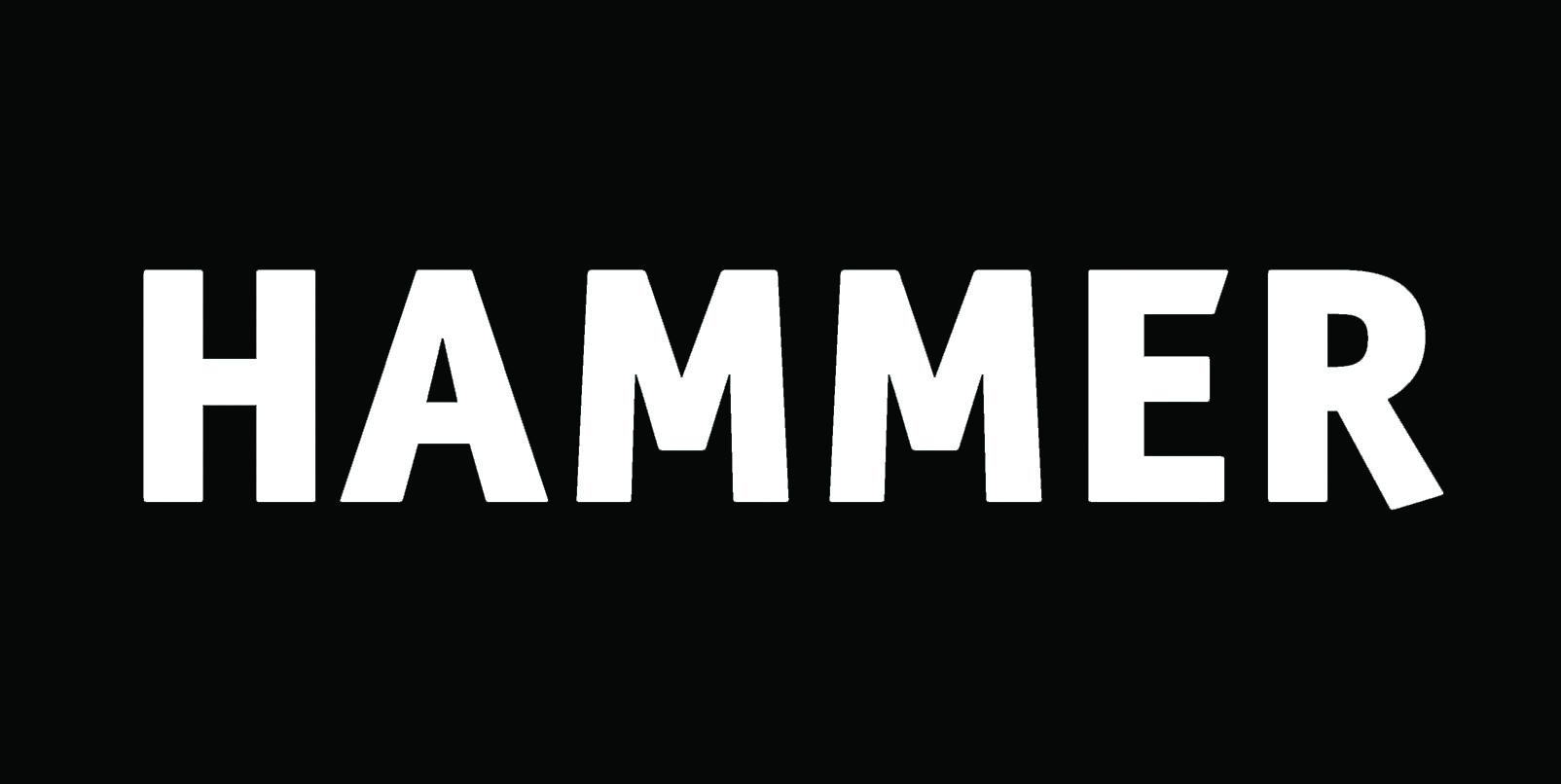

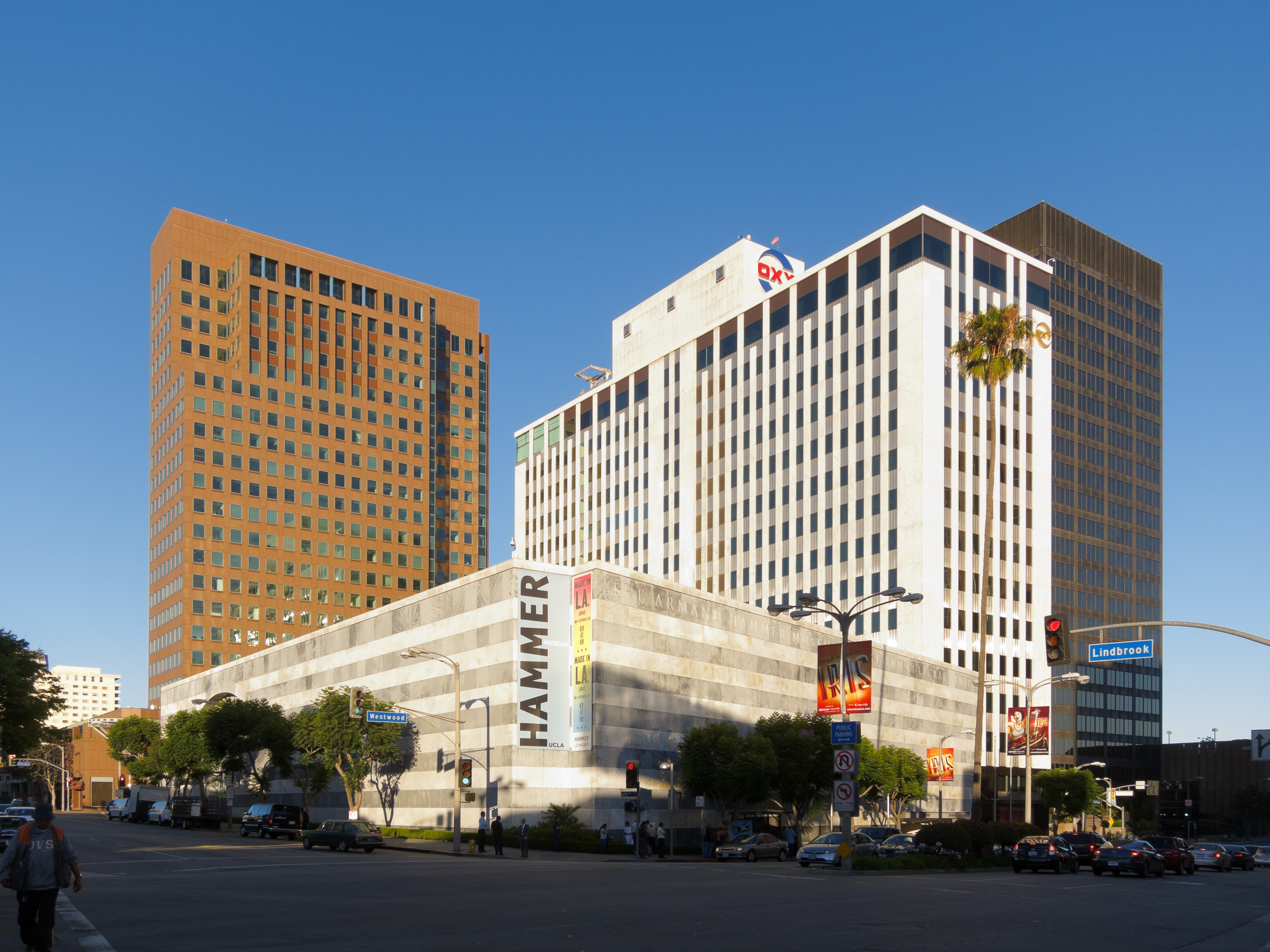
- Established: 1990
- Location: 10899 Wilshire Boulevard; Los Angeles, California 90024 (by UCLA campus)
- Coordinates: 34°3′34″N 118°26′37″W
- Type: Art museum, University of California, Los Angeles (UCLA)
- Director: Zoë Ryan
- Website: hammer.ucla.edu

The Hammer Museum is an art museum and cultural center known for its artist-centric and progressive array of exhibitions and public programs. It is affiliated with the University of California, Los Angeles. Founded in 1990 by the entrepreneur-industrialist Armand Hammer to house his personal art collection, the museum has since expanded its scope. The Hammer Museum hosts over 300 programs throughout the year, from lectures, symposia, and readings to concerts and film screenings. As of June 2025, the museum's collections, exhibitions, and programs are free to all visitors.

== Exhibitions ==
The Hammer opened November 28, 1990, with an exhibition of work by the Russian Suprematist painter Kazimir Malevich which originated at the National Gallery of Art in Washington and subsequently travelled to the Metropolitan Museum of Art in New York. The museum has since presented important single-artist and thematic exhibitions of historical and contemporary art. It has developed an international reputation for reintroducing artists and movements that have often been overlooked in the art historical canon. Notable examples include a 2003 retrospective of Lee Bontecou, co-organized with the Museum of Contemporary Art, Chicago; Heat Waves in a Swamp: The Paintings of Charles Burchfield, curated by the artist Robert Gober; and Now Dig This!: Art and Black Los Angeles, 1960–1980, the Hammer Museum's contribution to the Getty's 2011 Pacific Standard Time initiative. The Hammer is dedicated to diversity and inclusion. Of all of the solo exhibitions on view in Los Angeles between January 2008 and December 2012, the Hammer was the only institution that devoted 50% of its exhibition programming to female artists. The Hammer also hosts roughly fifteen Hammer Projects each year, offering international and local artists a laboratory-like surrounding to create new and innovative work.

=== Los Angeles Biennial: Made in L.A. ===
In 2010 the Hammer announced its inaugural biennial devoted exclusively to Los Angeles artists. Though the museum has routinely featured California artists as part of its ongoing exhibition program, the Made in L.A. series has emerged as an important and high-profile platform to showcase the diversity and energy of Los Angeles as an emerging art capitol. Organized by Hammer senior curator Anne Ellegood, Hammer curator Ali Subotnick, LAXART director and chief curator Lauri Firstenberg, LAXART associate director and senior curator Cesar Garcia, and LAXART curator-at-large Malik Gaines, the inaugural Made in L.A. in 2012 featured work by 60 Los Angeles artists in spaces throughout the city including the Hammer Museum itself, LAXART, and the Los Angeles Municipal Art Gallery in Barnsdall Art Park. In conjunction with the exhibition, the Hammer also sponsored a satellite exhibition, the Venice Beach Biennial on the Venice Boardwalk, between July 13 and 15th of that year.

The second iteration of Made in L.A. in 2014 took over the entire space of the museum to feature work by more than 30 different artists and collectives. The 2014 exhibition was organized by Hammer chief curator Connie Butler and independent curator Michael Ned Holte.

The most recent Made in L.A. exhibition, Acts of Living, was organized by curators Diana Nawi and Pablo José Ramírez and Luce Curatorial Fellow Ashton Cooper, features 39 artists, collectives, and organizations representing a cross-section of Los Angeles.

== Collections ==
The Hammer Museum manages five distinct collections: The Hammer Contemporary Collection; the collection of the UCLA Grunwald Center for the Graphic Arts; the Franklin D. Murphy Sculpture Garden; the Armand Hammer Collection, and the Armand Hammer Daumier and Contemporaries Collection.

=== Hammer Contemporary Collection ===
The Hammer Contemporary Collection, inaugurated in 1999, is the museum's collection of modern and contemporary art. The collection includes works on paper, primarily drawings and photographs, as well as paintings, sculpture, and media arts. The Contemporary Collection houses works from artists, including many active in Southern California from 1960 to the present. Hammer Contemporary Collection works are often acquired in tandem with exhibitions presented at the museum, including the Hammer Projects series focusing on the work of emerging artists.

The 2009 exhibition Second Nature: The Valentine-Adelson Collection at the Hammer exhibited selections from Dean Valentine and Amy Adelson's gift to the Hammer Contemporary Collection. The gift of fifty sculptures by 29 Los Angeles artists represents a significant milestone in the Hammer's commitment to collecting the works of Southern California artists.

In 2012, the Hammer showcased selections from the Susan and Larry Marx Collection. The exhibition was made possible by a substantial gift from longtime museum supporters Susan and Larry Marx and includes more than 150 paintings, sculptures, and works on paper by over 100 international artists from the post-World War II period. The collection includes examples of Abstract Expressionism on canvas and paper by the American artists Jackson Pollock, Willem de Kooning, and Philip Guston as well as works by contemporary artists including Mark Bradford, Rachel Whiteread, Mary Heilmann, and Mark Grotjahn among others.

Highlights from the contemporary collection include: The Battle of Atlanta: Being the Narrative of a Negress in the Flames of Desire - A Reconstruction (1995) by Kara Walker, Untitled (2007) by Mark Bradford, Migration (2008) by Doug Aitken, Untitled #5 (2010) by Lari Pittman, Mirage (2011) by Katie Grinnan, Ruby I (2012) by Mary Weatherford, Mimus Act I (2012) by Mary Kelly.

Notable recent acquisitions to the Hammer Contemporary Collection include Suzanne Lacy's Three Weeks in May (1977), as well as major works by Lisa Anne Auerbach, Fiona Connor, Bruce Conner, Jeremy Deller, Jessica Jackson Hutchins, Friedrich Kunath, Tala Madani, Allan McCollum, Robert Overby, Martha Rosler, Sterling Ruby, Allen Ruppersberg, Barbara T. Smith, William Leavitt, and Eric Wesley.

=== UCLA Grunwald Center for the Graphic Arts at the Hammer Museum ===
Pablo Picasso, 1904, Le repas frugal (The Frugal Repast). Printed in 1913. Etching. Plate: 46.7 x 36 cm; Sheet: 65.4 x 47.6 cm

The UCLA Grunwald Center for the Graphic Arts is one of the largest collections of works on paper in the country. Housed at the Hammer Museum, the center was established in 1956 after a gift from Fred Grunwald and today houses over 40,000 prints, drawings, photographs, and artists' books. The collection includes works dating from the Renaissance to the present, including European old master prints and drawings, Japanese ukiyo-e woodblock prints, and a collection of contemporary photography initiated by UCLA photographer Robert Heinecken (1931–2006).

In 1988 the Grunwald Center received a bequest of over 850 landscape drawings and prints from the collection of Los Angeles–based architect Rudolf L. Baumfeld. The Baumfeld Collection includes important examples of European landscapes from the 16th to 20th-centuries and includes pure landscapes, as well as views of architectural ruins and urban scenes. The Eunice and Hal David Collection, bequeathed to the Grunwald Center by lyricist Hal David and his wife Eunice, is a collection of 19th and 20th-century drawings by European and American artists. Selections from the collection were exhibited at the Hammer in 2003. The 2014 exhibition showcased works from the Elisabeth Dean Collection of 19th and 20th-century works on paper. The collection of approximately 900 prints and illustrated books is among the most significant gifts received by the Grunwald Center in recent years.

The Grunwald Center is also home to several important collections of Los Angeles–based contemporary artists. The Grunwald Center's collection features over 1,000 works by Sister Corita Kent, an influential pop printmaker and social justice activist, including rare preparatory studies and sketchbooks. Additionally, the Grunwald maintains an archive of the first twenty years of June Wayne's influential Tamarind Lithography Workshop, offering a rare overview of contemporary print-making in Los Angeles. Jointly acquired by the Grunwald and the Los Angeles County Museum of Art, the Grunwald Center maintains a complete archive of prints by Los Angeles publisher Edition Jacob Samuel which documents the activity of master intaglio print-maker Jacob Samuel. Highlights from the archive were exhibited in the 2010 exhibition Outside the Box: Edition Jacob Samuel, 1988-2010.

A research and education resource, the Grunwald Center study room is available by appointment to faculty, students, and members of the public.

Highlights from the Grunwald's collection include: Melencolia I (1514) by Albrecht Dürer, Christ Preaching (1652) by Rembrandt van Rijn, Maple trees at Mama, Tekona Shrine and linked Bridge (1857) by Utagawa Hiroshige, Les Grands Baigneurs (1896) by Paul Cézanne, Le Repas Frugal (1904) by Pablo Picasso, and Entropia (review) (2004), by Julie Mehretu.

=== Franklin D. Murphy Sculpture Garden ===
The Franklin D. Murphy Sculpture Garden at UCLA was inaugurated in 1967 and dedicated to the eponymous chancellor of the university. Designed by famed landscape architect Ralph Cornell, the garden houses over 70 works of modern and contemporary sculpture in a five-acre, park-like setting. Group tours of the garden can be scheduled through the Hammer's online request form.

The 72 object collection comprises works by Deborah Butterfield, Alexander Calder, Henri Matisse, Joan Miró, Henry Moore, Isamu Noguchi, Auguste Rodin, and David Smith. A fully illustrated catalogue, including scholarly entries for each artist, was published by in 2007 by the Hammer Museum.

=== Armand Hammer Collection ===
The Armand Hammer Collection is a small selection of European and American paintings, drawings, and prints that formed the original impetus for the foundation of the Hammer Museum. Armand Hammer, the founder and namesake of the museum, assembled and refined the collection through decades of involvement in the art market, both as a collector in his own right and as a co-founder of Hammer Galleries in New York City. The focus of the collection is primarily 19th century and early-20th century French impressionist and post-impressionist paintings, though the collection itself spans the 16th through the 20th century.

Selections from the collection are on permanent display in the Hammer Museum's third floor galleries. Highlights of the collection include: Juno (ca. 1665-1668) by Rembrandt van Rijn, The Education of the Virgin (1748-1752) by Jean-Honoré Fragonard, El Pelele (ca. 1791) by Francisco Goya, Salome Dancing before Herod (1876) by Gustave Moreau, Dr. Pozzi at Home (1881) by John Singer Sargent, Bonjour Monsieur Gauguin (1889) by Paul Gauguin, and Hospital at Saint-Remy (1889) by Vincent van Gogh.

=== Daumier and Contemporaries Collection ===
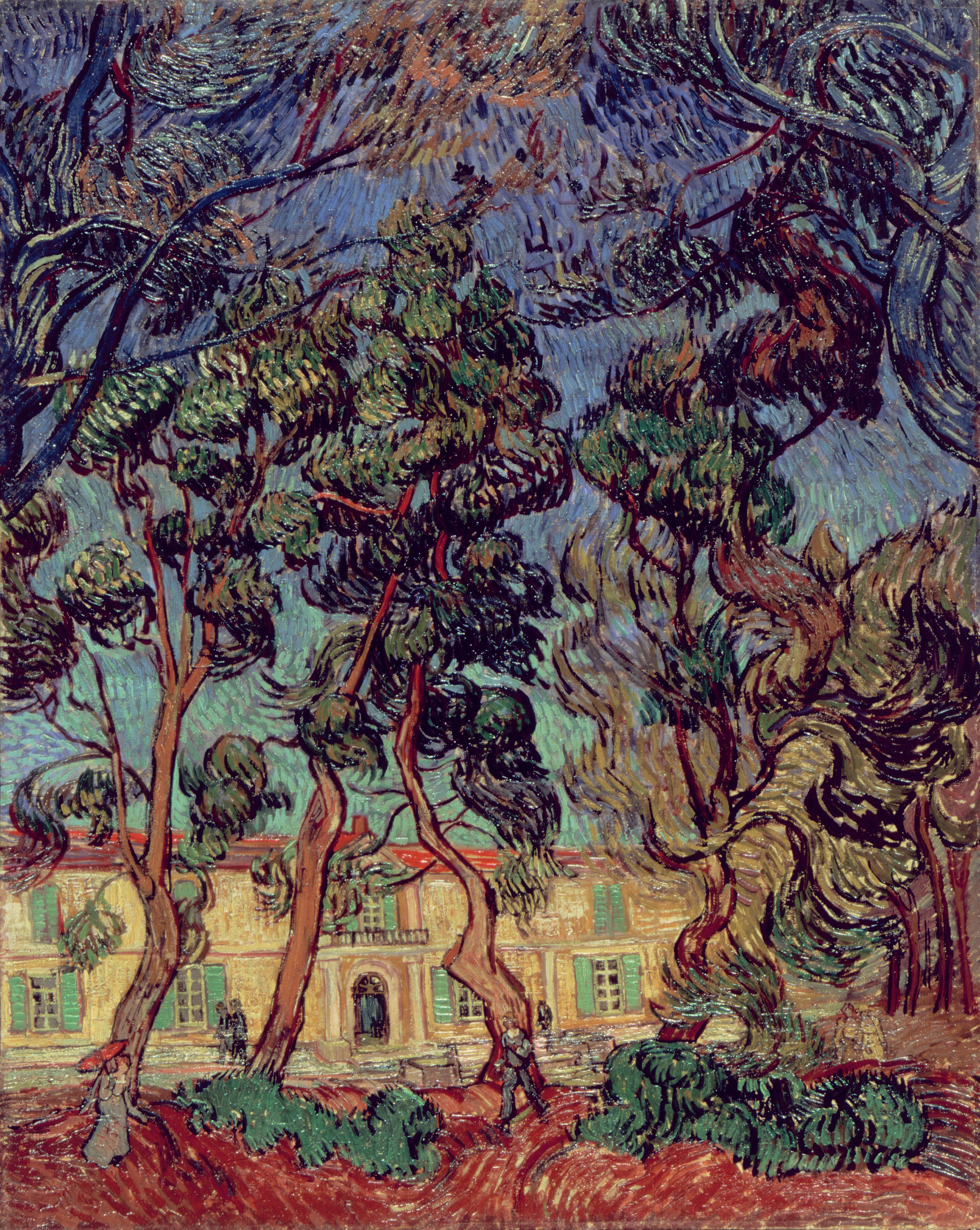
Vincent van Gogh. Hospital at Saint-Rémy, 1889. Oil on canvas. 36 5/16 x 28 7/8 in. (92.2 x 73.4 cm). The Armand Hammer Collection, Gift of the Armand Hammer Foundation. Hammer Museum, Los Angeles.

The Honoré Daumier and Contemporaries Collection at the Hammer Museum is one of the most important collections of Daumier works outside France. Housing over 7,500 works of art by the French satirist Honoré Daumier (1808-1879) and other contemporary caricaturists, it is the largest of its kind outside of Paris. Daumier was an extremely prolific artist whose work spans multiple media, and as such the collection includes paintings, drawings, lithographs, and a series of bronze portrait busts.

Highlights from the Daumier and Contemporaries Collection include Daumier's Le passé - Le present - L'avenir (1834), Un Avocat Plaidant, (ca. 1845) Nadar élevant la Photographie á la hauteur de l'Art (1862), and Don Quixote et Sancho Panza (1866-1868).

== Programs ==
The Billy Wilder Theater opened at the Hammer Museum in late 2006, after a $5 million gift from Audrey L. Wilder, the widow of Billy Wilder, enabled the museum to resume building a 300-seat theater left unfinished at Armand Hammer's death. Its 2006 opening coincided with the centennial of Wilder's birth. The venue currently houses the UCLA Film and Television Archive's well-known cinematheque as well as the Hammer's 300 public programs a year.

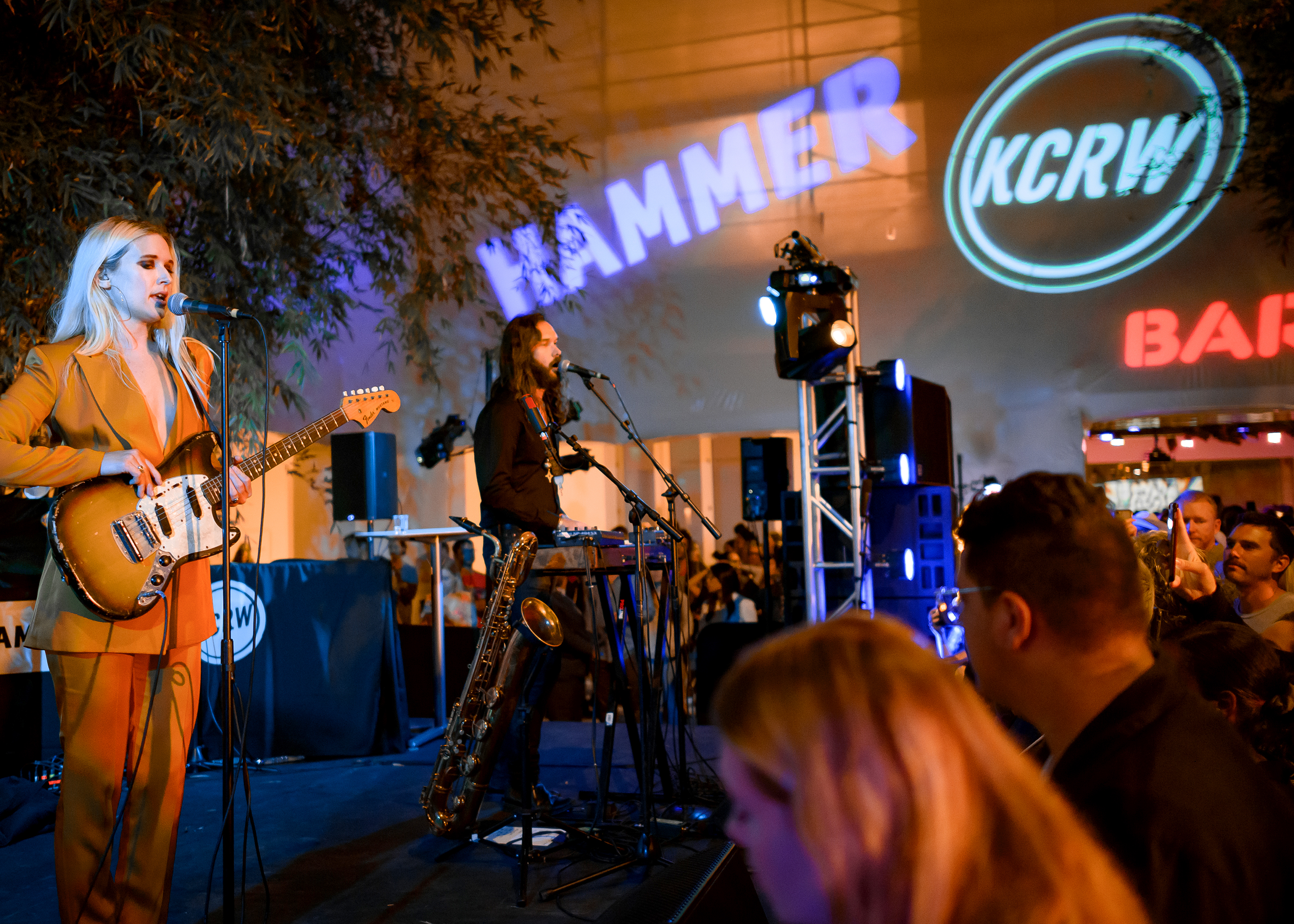
Wild Belle performing live at the Hammer Museum in Westwood, Los Angeles, California, on Thursday, July 18, 2019. Pictured: Natalie Bergman - vocals and Fender Mustang guitar; Elliot Bergman - vocals and keyboards.

Popular series include a weekly meditation program, the Libros Schmibros book club, and the Hammer Conversations which place major cultural, political, and intellectual leaders in dialog with one another. Past Hammer Conversations participants include the writers Joan Didion, Jonathan Lethem, and George Saunders, the filmmakers Atom Egoyan and Miranda July, journalist Naomi Klein, comedians Jeff Garlin and Patton Oswalt, playwright and screenwriter David Mamet, magician Ricky Jay, artists Betye Saar and Sam Durant, actors Leonard Nimoy and Zachary Quinto, and many others. Since 2010, the Hammer has partnered with the radio station KCRW to host an annual outdoor summer concert series. In the past, the Hammer traditionally focused on university-level education programs because of its affiliation with UCLA.

=== Mohn Award ===
In conjunction with the inaugural Made in L.A. exhibition in 2012, the Hammer offered the first iteration of the Mohn Award. The Mohn Award is funded by Los Angeles philanthropists and art collectors Jarl and Pamela Mohn and the Mohn Family Foundation.

The award originally consisted of a catalogue and a $100,000 cash prize and was decided by public vote after a jury of experts narrowed the 60 participants to five finalists. In 2014 the Hammer announced it was offering three awards in conjunction with Made in L.A. 2014: The Mohn Award ($100,000), the Career Achievement Award ($25,000)—both of which are selected by a professional jury—and the Public Recognition Award ($25,000), which is awarded by popular vote among exhibition visitors. All three awards are again funded by Jarl and Pamela Mohn and the Mohn Family Foundation.

Past recipients are:

- 2012 – Meleko Mokgosi
- 2014 – Alice Könitz; Michael Frimkess and Magdalena Suarez Frimkess (Career Achievement Award); Jennifer Moon (Public Recognition Award)
- 2016 – Adam Linder; Wadada Leo Smith (Career Achievement Award); Kenzi Shiokava (Public Recognition Award)
- 2018 – Lauren Halsey; Daniel Joseph Martinez (Career Achievement Award); EJ Hill (Public Recognition Award)
- 2021 – Kandis Williams; Monica Majoli (Career Achievement Award); Mr. Wash (Public Recognition Award)
- 2023 – Akinsanya Kambon; Pippa Garner (Career Achievement Award); Jackie Amézquita (Public Recognition Award)

== History ==
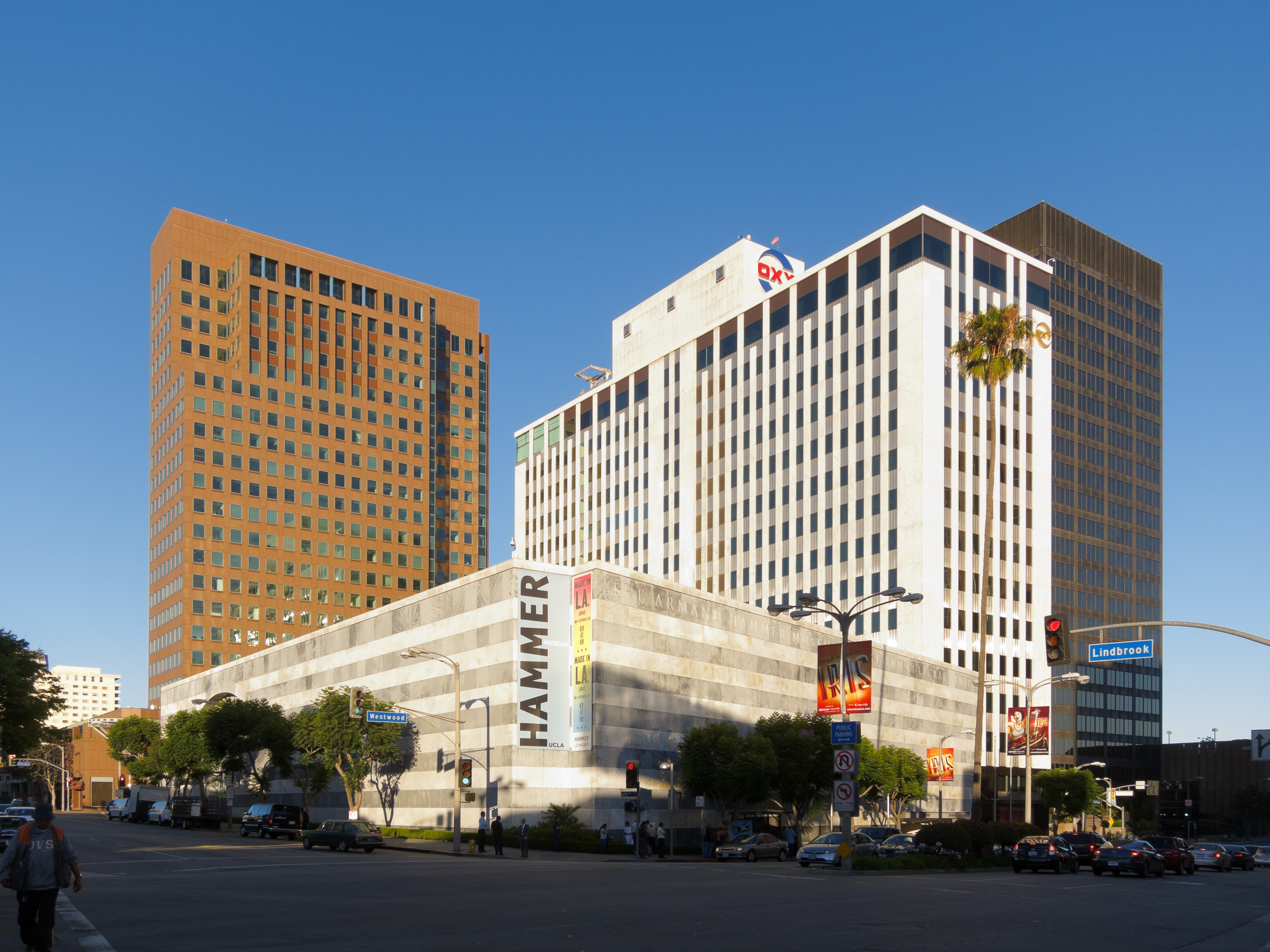
Hammer Museum building in Westwood, Los Angeles

The museum was founded by Armand Hammer, the late CEO of the Occidental Petroleum Corporation, as a venue to exhibit his extensive art collection, at the time valued at $250 million. A Los Angeles County Museum of Art board member for nearly 20 years, Hammer withdrew from a non-binding agreement to transfer his paintings to LACMA after disagreements regarding how his collection would be displayed. Shortly thereafter, on January 21, 1988, Hammer announced plans to build his own museum on the site of a Westwood parking garage adjacent to the Occidental headquarters. Community leaders who hailed the plan as a positive turning point in the neighborhood's development were soon overshadowed by complaints from Occidental shareholders who sued the company over the museum's escalating construction costs, which were capped by a federal judge at $60 million.

Designed by Edward Larrabee Barnes, the New York-based architect responsible for the Dallas Museum of Art and the Walker Art Center, the building housing the museum was conceived as a Renaissance palazzo with galleries centered around a tranquil, interior courtyard and a relatively austere exterior profile.

In 2006, architect Michael Maltzan designed the Billy Wilder Theater and the museum's café. Michael Maltzan Architecture also designed the John V. Tunney Bridge, which opened in February 2015. The pedestrian bridge, named in honor of John V. Tunney, longtime Chairman of the Board of Directors of the Hammer Museum, connects the upper level galleries over the Hammer Courtyard.

Hammer died less than a month after his namesake museum opened to the public in November 1990, leaving the fledgling institution mired in litigation over its financing and prompting new legal battles regarding the disposition of Hammer's estate. While the museum's operating budget was provided by a $36 million annuity purchased by Occidental Petroleum, questions remained regarding the future of the museum's collections and the role that the Hammer family would play in its administration. In 1994, the Regents of the University of California entered into a 99-year operating agreement with the Armand Hammer Foundation to assume management of the museum, which afforded the fledgling institution a measure of stability. At that point the exhibition programs of the Wight Art Gallery, UCLA's existing museum, and the Grunwald Center for the Graphic Arts, the university's print collection, were moved to the Hammer.

In 2001, Hammer Foundation president Michael Armand Hammer threatened to trigger a contract clause establishing the museum with University of California regents, giving it the right to reclaim the collection and some endowment funds, if strict donation rules were breached. Led by board chairman John V. Tunney and John Walsh, a settlement between the UC Regents and the Hammer Foundation in 2007 formally ended long-simmering disputes over the Hammer collection's ownership and established new guidelines for its display that allowed the museum more space for exhibitions and a growing contemporary collection. As part of the agreement, the foundation received 92 paintings—including Chaïm Soutine’s The Valet (1929)—together valued at $55 million, while the museum retained more than 100 paintings by Rembrandt, Vincent van Gogh, John Singer Sargent and others, valued at $250 million, and 7,500 works by Honoré Daumier and his contemporaries, valued at $8 million.

In 2017, the Hammer opened its renovated third-floor galleries; in 2018, it debuted a newly designed courtyard performance space along with a gallery for new media art. The Annenberg Terrace for education, installations and programming, featuring ping pong tables and couches, opened in 2019. In 2022, a works-on-paper gallery and a study room for the museum’s Grunwald Center Collection opened, along with the museum’s renovated store. The Lynda and Stewart Resnick Cultural Center opened in 2023, thanks to a $30 million gift from the couple-the largest individual gift in the museum's history.

Despite the institutional hurdles that earned it the nickname "America's vainest museum" at its inception, the Hammer is now widely acknowledged as "a hot spot for contemporary art and ideas and a venue for serious exploration of overlooked historical subjects." Under current leadership, the Hammer's budget has grown from $5 million to roughly $20 million annually, with a full-time staff of over 100.

In 2020, amidst the COVID-19 pandemic, the museum was temporary closed and laid off its 150 part-time student employees.

== Management ==
=== Directors ===
In 1994, Henry Hopkins, then director of the Wight gallery and professor in the Department of Art at UCLA, became director of the museum. He served in that position until his retirement in 1998. In 1999 Ann Philbin, previously director of The Drawing Center in New York, was named director. Philbin led the museum for 25 years until her retirement in November 2024. In January 2025, Zoë Ryan, previously director of the Institute of Contemporary Art at the University of Pennsylvania, became the Hammer's director.

=== Board of Directors and Board of Overseers ===
The Hammer Museum was founded by Dr. Armand Hammer. Michael Armand Hammer is Chairman Emeritus, and Armie Hammer and Viktor Armand Hammer are Honorary Directors. Michael Rubel serves as President, Nelson C. Rising serves as Vice President, and Steven A. Olsen serves as Treasurer. Under Chair Marcy Carsey, the Hammer's Board of Directors also includes Heather R. Axe, Renée Becnel, Gene Block, Lloyd E. Cotsen, Eric Esrailian, Erika J. Glazer, Manuela Herzer, Larry Marx, Anthony Pritzker, Lee Ramer, Kevin L. Ratner, Chip Rosenbloom, Steven P. Song, John V. Tunney, Kevin Wall, John Walsh, and Christopher A. Waterman. Members of the Board of Overseers include artists Barbara Kruger and Lari Pittman. The museum does not disclose its annual board membership dues.

=== Funding ===
In 1994, the Regents of the University of California entered into a 99-year operating agreement with the Armand Hammer Foundation and assumed management of the Hammer Museum, with the foundation retaining some control, including a "reversionary clause," granting the foundation rights to reclaim the art collection and some of the endowment funds. The museum had long desired to eliminate these clauses. Operating money came from a bond portfolio, UCLA's existing art budgets, private donations, and revenue from the museum. In 2009, the museum operates on an annual operating budget of $14 million, 10% to 12% of which comes from the university. By the fiscal year 2011, its budget of $16 million surpassed that of the much larger Museum of Contemporary Art, Los Angeles.

On January 19, 2007, the Hammer Museum and the Armand Hammer Foundation agreed to dissolve their relationship, dividing the remaining 195 objects which founded the museum; the foundation retaining 92 paintings valued at $55 million, while the museum retaining 103 objects, valued at $250 million. By 2020, the museum will use its bond portfolio, valued at about $55 million, to purchase the building that houses the museum and Occidental's former headquarters.

In addition, the Hammer Museum's annual Gala in the Garden serves as a fundraiser for the museum. The 2019 edition raised $2.7 million. Recent museum honorees include Robert Gober, Tony Kushner, Barbara Kruger, Cindy Sherman, Judy Chicago, Jordan Peele and Charles Gaines and Chase Strangio.

=== Attendance ===
At the Hammer Museum, 2010 attendance was an estimated 175,000, up from 150,000 in 2009. As of 2013, annual attendance for permanent collection, special exhibitions and programs stands at about 200,000. The museum does not provide exact figures as it does not have a computerized ticketing system.

=== Deaccessioning ===
In 1994, the Hammer Museum made headlines by selling Leonardo da Vinci's Codex Leicester to Microsoft founder Bill Gates for $30.8 million. The Codex Leicester was one of Dr. Hammer's proudest acquisitions, purchased in 1980 for $5.12 million, and one which he unsuccessfully tried to rename the Codex Hammer. Most museums have collection guidelines for deaccessing art, which require the revenue from sales to be used for future acquisitions. The Hammer Museum instead sold the 72-page scientific notebook to fund the museum's exhibitions and programs.
