= John Mason (artist) =

American ceramic artist (1927–2019)

- Born: March 30, 1927; Madrid, Nebraska
- Died: January 20, 2019 (aged 91); Carlsbad, California
- Education: Otis Art Institute, Chouinard Art Institute
- Known for: Ceramic art, Sculpture

John Mason (March 30, 1927 – January 20, 2019) was an American artist who did experimental work with ceramics. Mason's work focused on exploring the physical properties of clay and its "extreme plasticity". One of a group of artists who had studied under the pioneering ceramicist Peter Voulkos, he created wall reliefs and expressionistic sculptures, often on a monumental scale.

== Biography ==
Mason spent his early childhood in the Midwest; his family moved to Fallon, Nevada in 1937, where he finished elementary and high school. He settled in Los Angeles in 1949 at the age of 22. He attended Otis Art Institute, and in 1954 enrolled at Chouinard Art Institute, where he became a student and close friend of ceramicist Peter Voulkos. The two rented a studio space together in 1957, which they shared until Voulkos moved to Berkeley, California in the fall of 1958.

Mason's early Vertical Sculptures from the early 1960s were associated with contemporary trends in Abstract Expressionism and also with the aesthetics of primitivism. Writer Richard Marshall commented that in their "rawness, spontaneity and expressiveness, [the pieces] give the impression of having been formed by natural forces. The formal and technical aspects of balance, proportion, and stability – although purposefully planned and controlled – are subsumed by the very presence of the material itself".

Mason taught sculpture at Pomona College.

Mason later equipped his studio to prepare, manipulate, and fire monumental sculptures in clay, many of which had to be fired in pieces weighing over a ton in kilns that had already been adapted to serve his large-scale purposes, before being assembled on the wall. According to writer and curator Barbara Haskell, who wrote the introduction to the catalog for Mason's 1974 retrospective at the Pasadena Museum of Art, "These pieces have a monumentality and physical size that had no precedent in contemporary ceramics".

A subsequent series represents a more conceptual approach to Mason's interest in mathematics, one that is concerned less with the physical properties of clay as a medium and more with what those properties allow one to represent. As Richard Marshall wrote:

The Firebrick Sculptures, begun in the early 1970s, reveal a shift in Mason's work away from an involvement with materials and technique toward an involvement with the conceptualization and systematization of a piece that is removed from its actual realization. While maintaining an association with the ceramic tradition – firebricks are made of ceramic material and are used for the construction of kilns – their neutral color and standardized form make it possible to conceive of and execute large-scale geometric configurations of stacked bricks, such as Hudson River Series VIII (1978), in a variety of mathematically plotted arrangements.
