= California Historical Landmarks in Contra Costa County =

List table of the properties and districts listed as California Historical Landmarks within Contra Costa County, Northern California.

- Note: Click the "Map of all coordinates" link to the right to view a Google map of all properties and districts with latitude and longitude coordinates in the table below.

== Listings ==
Image		Landmark name	Location	City or town	Summary
Alvarado Adobe	512	Alvarado Adobe	San Pablo Blvd. & Church Ln. 37°57′31″N 122°20′26″W	San Pablo	
Captain Pedro Fages Trail	853	Captain Pedro Fages Trail	856 Danville Blvd. 37°50′04″N 122°00′59″W	Danville	
Upload Photo	356	Castro Home	9800 San Pablo Ave. 37°53′53″N 122°18′05″W	El Cerrito	
Don Fernando Pacheco Adobe	455	Don Fernando Pacheco Adobe	3119 Grant St. 37°59′46″N 122°02′33″W	Concord	Also on the NRHP list as NPS-80000798
Don Salvio Pacheco Adobe	515	Don Salvio Pacheco Adobe	1870 Adobe St. 37°58′35″N 122°02′16″W	Concord	
East Brother Light Station	951	East Brother Light Station	Point San Pablo; 37°57′48″N 122°26′00″W	Point San Pablo	
John Muir home	312	John Muir home	4202 Alhambra Ave. 37°59′29″N 122°08′00″W	Martinez	Also on the NRHP list as NPS-66000083
Mount Diablo	905	Mount Diablo	Mount Diablo State Park; 37°52′54″N 121°54′51″W	Danville	
Mount Diablo coal field	932	Mount Diablo coal field	Black Diamond Mines Regional Preserve; 37°57′01″N 121°51′25″W	Antioch	Also on the NRHP list as NPS-91001425
The Old Homestead	731	The Old Homestead	993 Loring Ave; 38°03′18″N 122°13′16″W	Crockett	
Richmond Shipyards District	1032	Richmond Shipyards District	Historic district 37°54′22″N 122°21′53″W	Richmond	Also on the NRHP list as NPS-00000364
Upload Photo	1002-1	Site of Giant Powder Company	Point Pinole Regional Shoreline; 37°59′32″N 122°21′19″W	Richmond	The location of an earlier Giant factory in San Francisco is listed as California Historical Landmark number 1002.
Site of the murder of Dr. John Marsh	722	Site of the murder of Dr. John Marsh	Across the street from 4575 Pacheco Blvd; 38°00′19″N 122°05′15″W	Martinez	
Vicente Martinez Adobe	511	Vicente Martinez Adobe	Alhambra Way & Hwy 4; 37°59′32″N 122°07′51″W	Martinez	

== See also ==
- List of California Historical Landmarks
- National Register of Historic Places listings in Contra Costa County, California
