= Pinole (disambiguation) =

Pinole is a Mesoamerican food made from maize.

Pinole may also refer to:

- Pinole, California, an American city
- Pinole clover, Trifolium bifidum, a species of flowering plant
- Pinole Creek, a stream flowing into San Pablo Bay, California

== See also ==
- Pinol, an Andean barley-based drink
- Pinolillo, a sweet cornmeal and cacao-based drink in Nicaragua
- Bank of Pinole, an historic building in Contra Costa County, California
- Pinole Tuff Formation, a geologic formation in California
- Rancho El Pinole, a Mexican land grant in present-day California
