= Pacheco Creek (Contra Costa County) =

Waterway in Contra Costa County, California, United States

Coordinates: 38.044365°N 122.092465°W

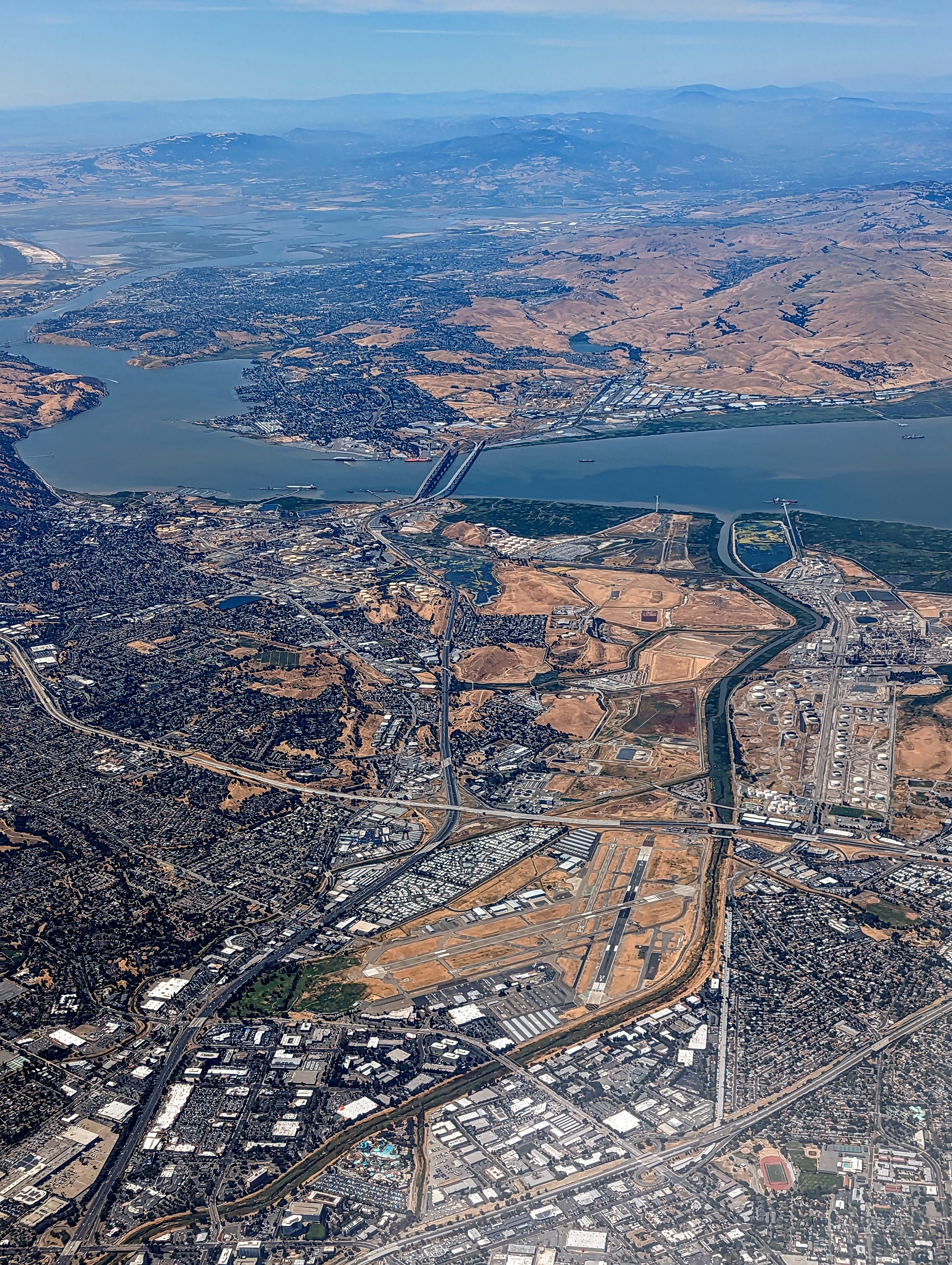
Aerial view of Pacheco Creek (center right), with mouth at Suisun Bay and source just above Buchanan Field Airport at the confluence of Walnut Creek (lower center) and Grayson Creek

Pacheco Creek is a 3.4-mile-long (5.5 km) waterway in central Contra Costa County, California, United States. It empties into Suisun Bay. It is formed by the intersection of Walnut Creek, Grayson Creek and Pine Creek.

The creek has a run of chinook salmon and steelhead trout after periods of rain in the winter and fall.

== History ==
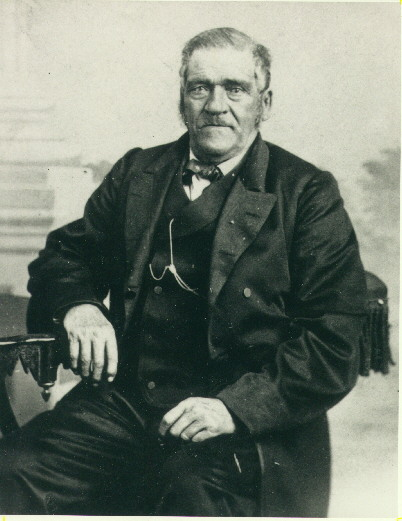
Pacheco Creak is named for Salvio Pacheco, a Californio ranchero, who owned Rancho Monte del Diablo.

Salvio Pacheco, a Californio ranchero and military officer, was granted the Rancho Monte del Diablo in 1834, and settled there in 1844. The creek is named for him.

== See also ==
- List of watercourses in the San Francisco Bay Area
