= Ranchos of California =

1775–1846 Spanish and Mexican land grants

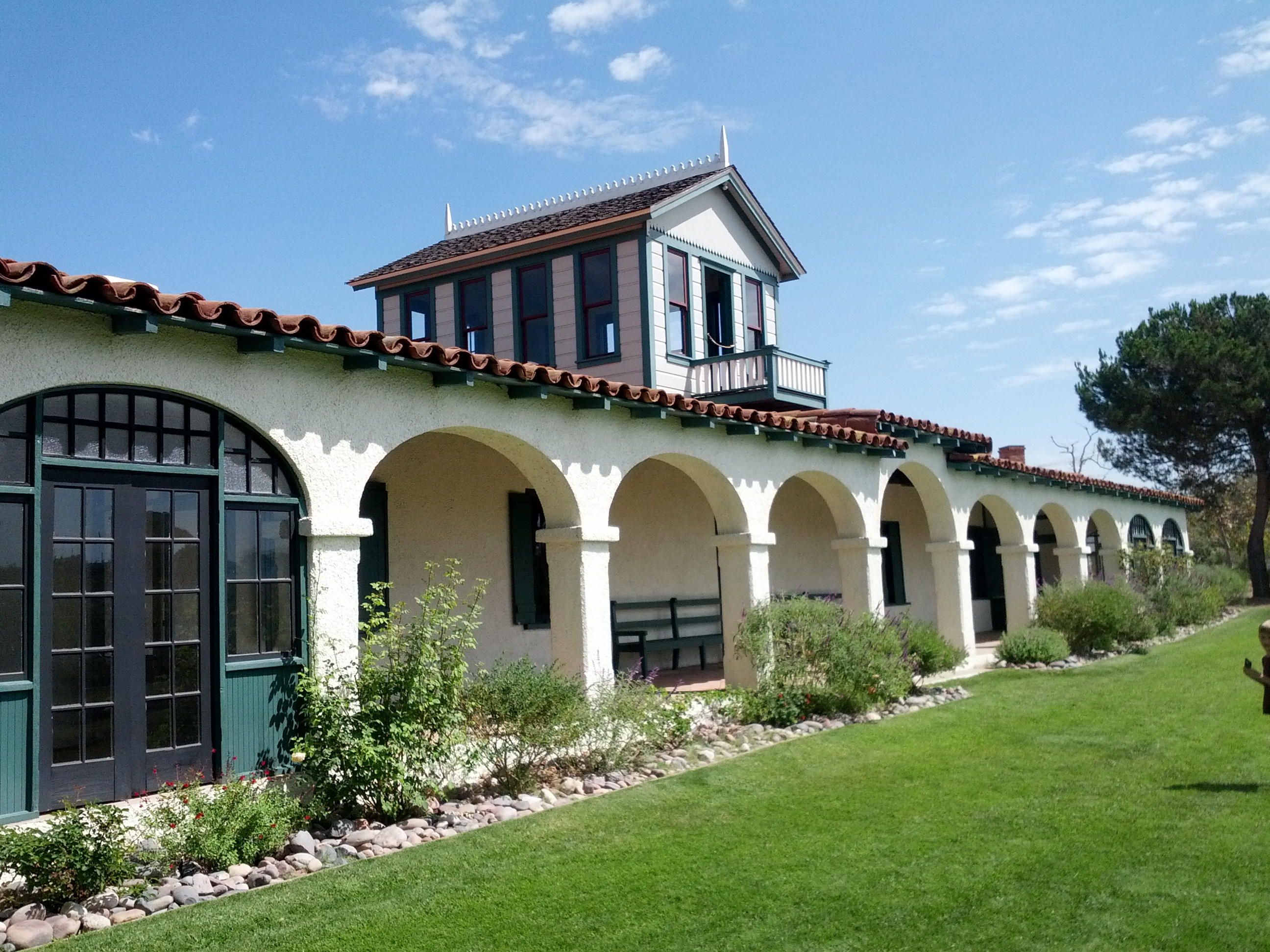
The Guajome Adobe, built 1852–53 as the seat of Rancho Guajome

The ranchos of California were conveyances of land ownership from the national government to private individuals, in what was then known as Alta California, made by the Spanish and Mexican governments between 1775 and 1846. The word was also used to describe authorized settlements by individual missions, where cattle were grazed and farm goods cultivated in its surrounding landscape.

== Spanish Ranchos ==
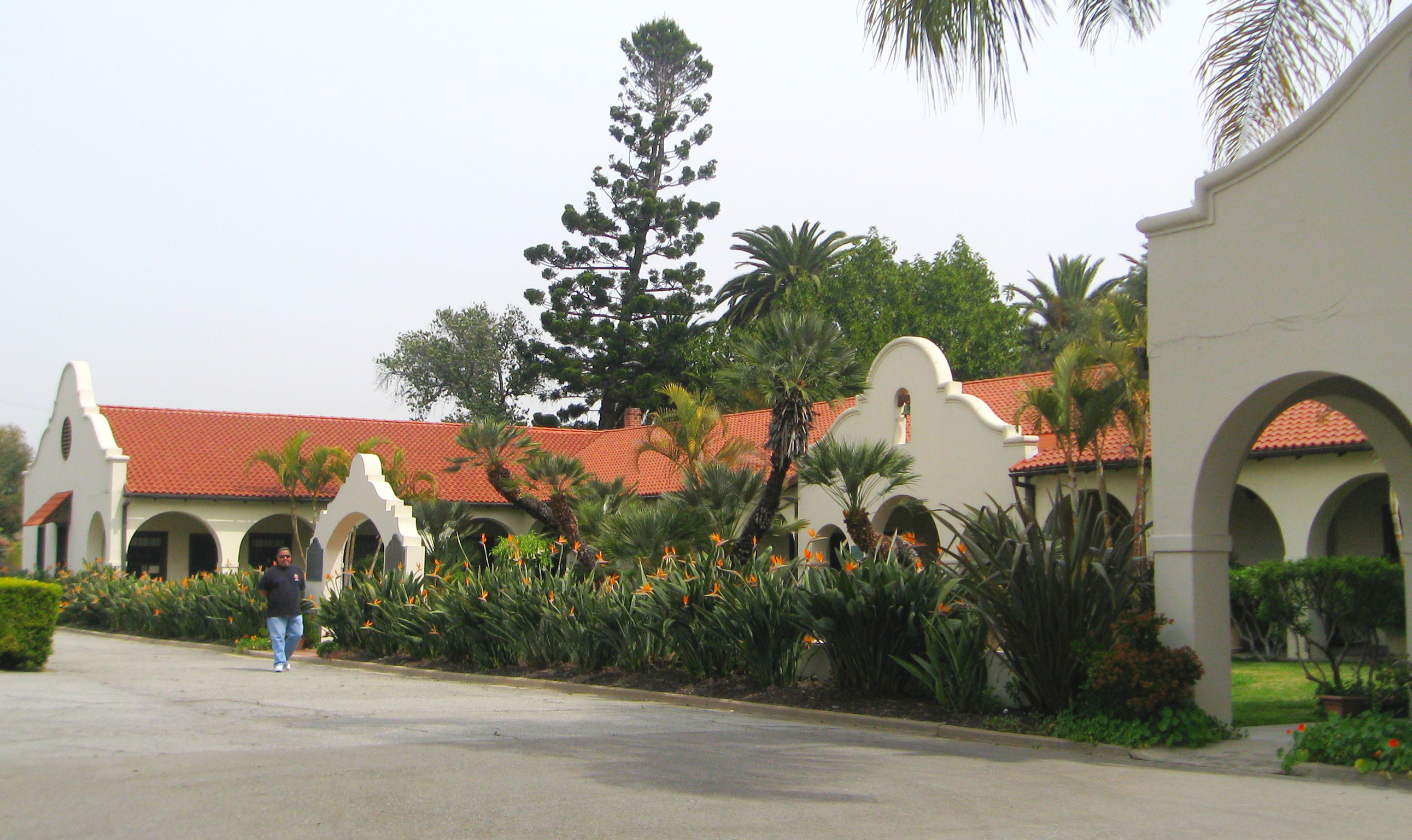
Manuel Domínguez built Domínguez Adobe on Rancho San Pedro in 1826.

Before 1754, only the Spanish Crown could grant lands in Alta California. For several years, the Franciscan missionaries were the only beneficiaries of this policy. Spanish laws allowed four square leagues of land (one league square being approximately 4,428 acres (1,792 ha)) to be granted to newly-formed settlements, or pueblos.

Settlement on the ranchos outside presidio, mission, and pueblo boundaries began in 1784. Private individuals applied to the Governor for grants and he issued a few written temporary permits. The Spanish crown retained title. In 1784, Juan José Domínguez received permission from Spanish Governor Pedro Fages to graze his cattle on the 48,000-acre (190 km^{2}) Rancho San Pedro.

Two years later the governor received authority to grant tracts not exceeding three square leagues, as long as they did not conflict with the boundaries of existing pueblos. The grantee was required to build a stone house and to keep at least 2,000 head of stock on each rancho.

== Mission Ranchos ==
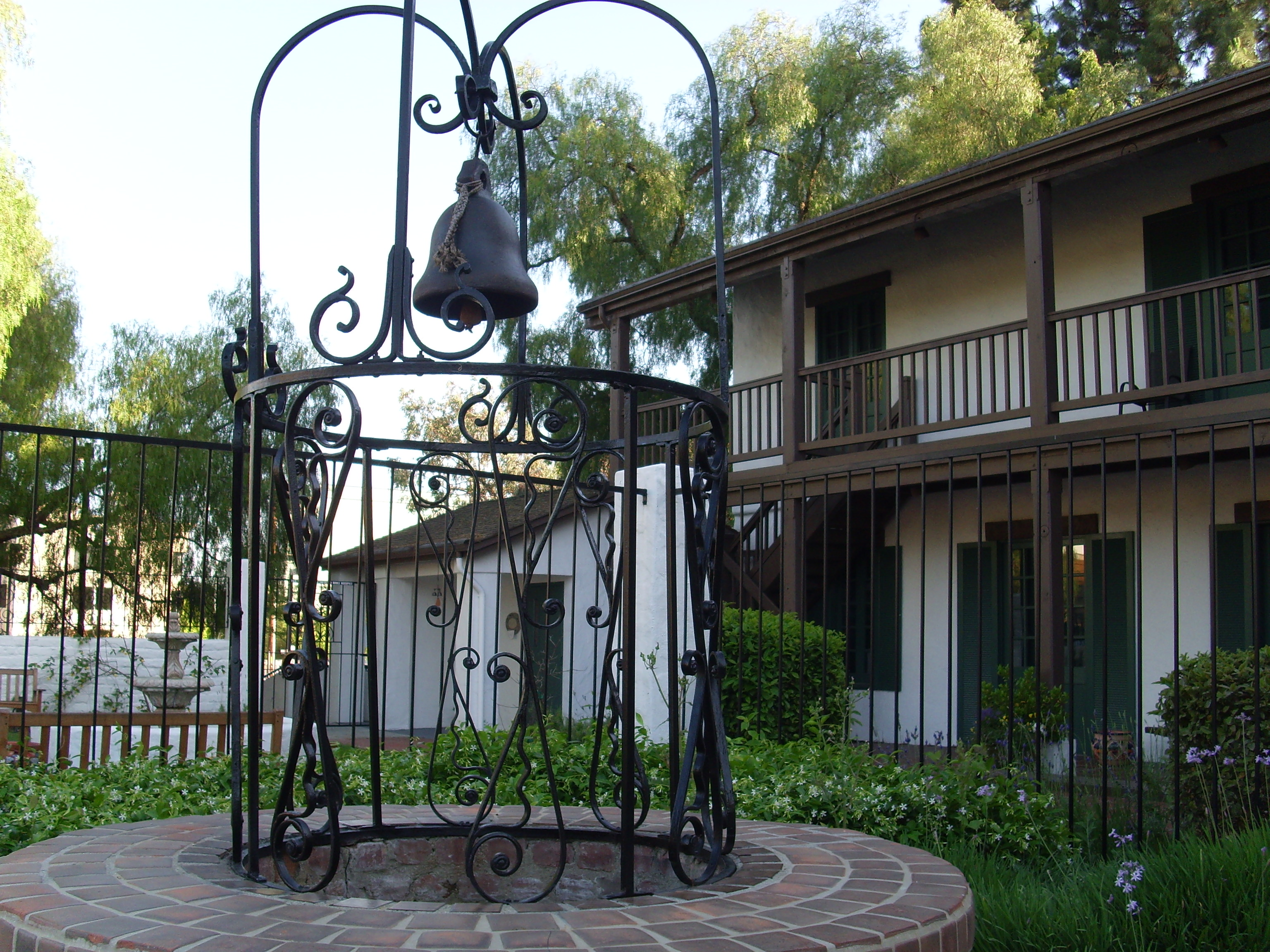
Pacheco Adobe, built 1835 by Salvio Pacheco on Rancho Monte del Diablo

Spanish missionaries arrived in Alta California, fully intending to congregate baptized Natives within mission designated sites. After a mission's creation, the baptized became laborers and were required to relocate close to the mission center.. As the population of converts grew the Franciscans developed auxiliary settlements in more outlying areas, where sheep and cattle were grazed and the banks of the larger arroyos cultivated. Closer settlements would be tended by laborers from the mission's center. Settlements beyond such a daily walk would augment development with their own residences, with chapels occasionally being constructed. Missionaries would ride the circuit of these "Mission Ranchos," observing productivity and performing necessary religious rites. It is not clear if workers became permanent residents of these sites or if groups were regularly rotated back to the mission center.

Mission San Jose offers an example of the arc of mission rancho development. Founded in 1795, the mission began by developing structures and the surrounding land. By perhaps the 1810s, mission ranchos were established in the valleys to its north, reaching its maximum extent in the 1820s and then slowly withdrew from them over the next 25 years. The lands along the San Francisco Bay shoreline - north of the Arroyo San Leandro - were never considered by the Franciscans for development; Fr. Duran wrote to the governor to support the Peralta family's settlement of Rancho San Antonio in 1820. The interior Mission Ranchos of Acalanes, Monte Diablo and northern San Ramon Valley were abandoned years before the Mexican government began considering them for private land ownership in the mid-1820s.

In the 1820s and 1830s several privatization plans were promoted by Alta California's governors, but Governor Juan B. Alvarado put the idea into regular practice and decreed that all non-religious mission property was to be managed by a state-appointed administrador. At first, Fr. Gonzales objected to any replacement by private ranchos (examples include Ranchos Valle de San Jose and Santa Rita); Mission San Jose's administrador also objected to privatizing western part of Livermore Valley, being the same ranchos that Gonzales objected to. But such protests were generally ignored by Alvarado and by 1840 the Livermore-San Ramon Valley was completely private ranchos. The bay shore ranchos were treated similarly, San Leandro/San Lorenzo to the north were abandoned by about 1840 with the last private concession made by Alvarado in 1844.

== Mexican Ranchos ==
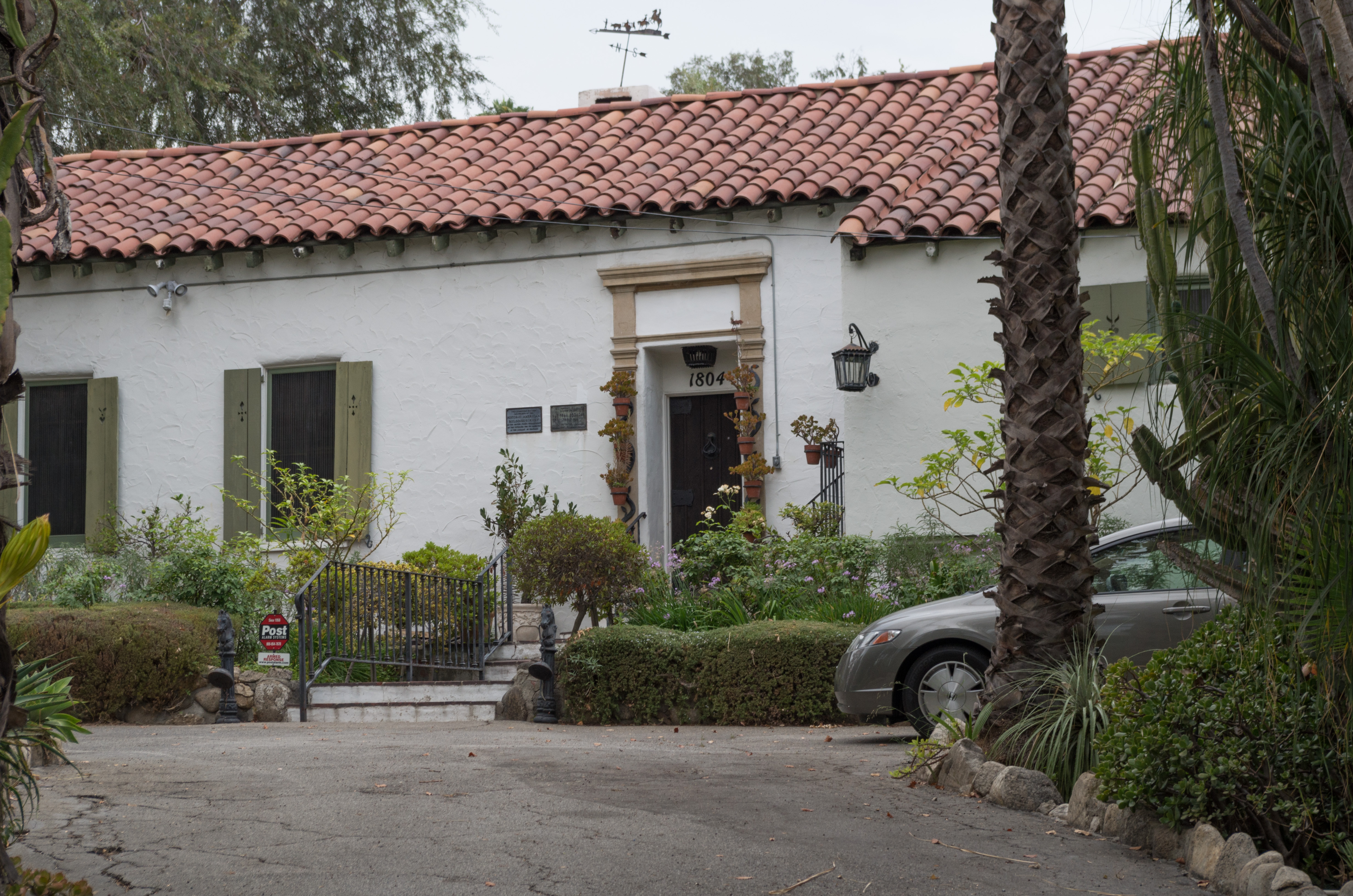
The Flores Adobe was built 1838–45 by Governor José María Flores on Rancho San Pascual.

Alta California first colonists were mostly vaqueros in their hometowns of Northwestern Mexico and Baja California; being too poor to own cattle, they managed them for others. As herds increased relatively quickly, the settlers continued their tradition of managing herds, for the missions, the presidios and for themselves. Common lands surrounding pueblos (ejidos) were rented out for cattle grazing, as were unused pastures held by the Franciscans. But for subsequent generations, there was increasing pressure by some to be allowed to own their own lands where herds could increase beyond the capacity of the shared ejidos. The ever-increasing demand for hides by New England whaling ships (they paid $2 per hide) meant ownership of grazing land would be in high demand throughout the Mexican Era.

During the Mexican era (1821–1846) the 1824 Mexican Colony Law established rules for petitioning for land grants in California; and by 1828, the rules for establishing land grants were codified in the Mexican Reglamento. (See General Colonization Law.)

=== Rancho Privatization ===
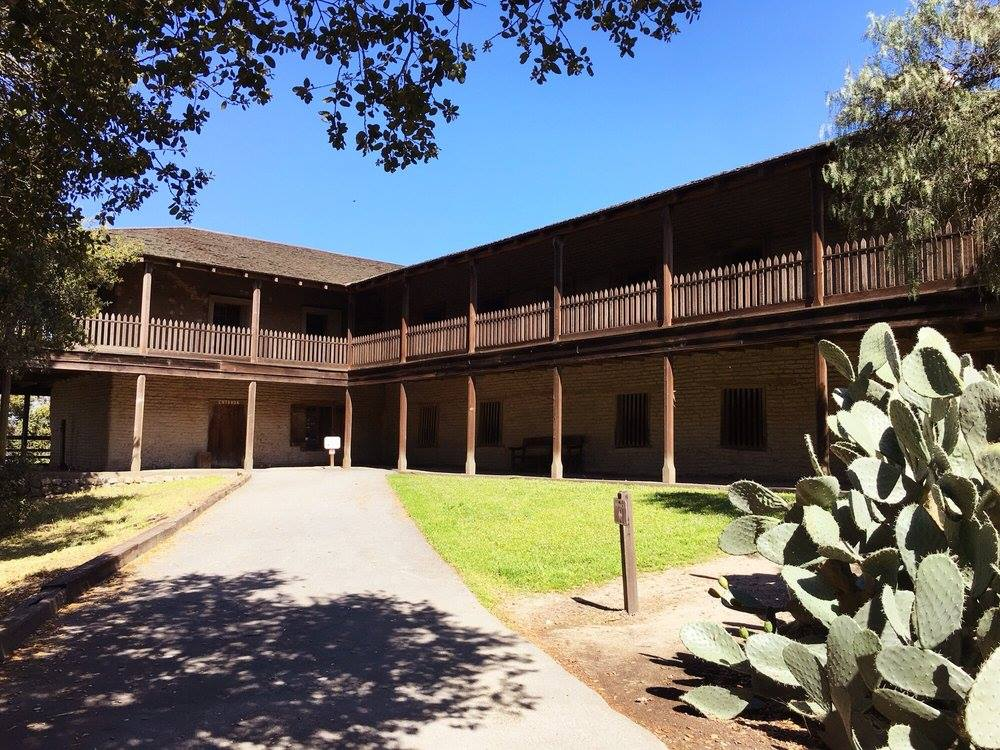
The Petaluma Adobe, built by General Mariano Guadalupe Vallejo in 1836 on Rancho Petaluma

Soldiers, rancheros, farmers, and those in power coveted the rich coastal lands that the missions controlled. The Mexican government was also fearful about the missions which remained loyal to the Pope and the Catholic Church in Spain. In August 1833, the government secularized all of the missions and their valuable lands, about 1,000,000 acres (400,000 ha) per mission. The Mexican government allowed the padres to keep only the church, priest's quarters, and priest's garden. The army troops guarding each Mission were dismissed.

The concession process began with a written application to the governor for a specific parcel of land. If the applicant could not write, neighbors could be hired for the task. In a land with no surveyors, the applicant would submit a diseño (map) showing general landmarks and drawn freehand by artists of varying skills, throughout a large area of interest where the concession might be located. The governor would call for an investigation: a report by the local military officer or civic leader such as the alcalde (mayor), together with a report from the mission. Applications tended to be sorted by the governor's Secretary of the Interior who made recommendations that were invariably followed. But the key considerations for ownership were: The alcalde's recommendation based on the applicant's national citizenship, cattle management skills and owner of a cattle herd to begin to fill a rancho. (An additional request for three local recommendations disappeared over time.) With the secretary's approval on the application, the governor "conceded" the land by first issuing a decreto (decree) announcing a decision for a grant. This was followed by a vote by the legislative Departmental Assembly and then a title deed (titulo) that acknowledged concession of land to the applicant; either the land's boundaries or the amount of land the applicant could own - anywhere withinthe diseño. The governor had national authority to convey a grant as small as 400 square varas (about ⅓ acre) to 11 leagues (about 50,000 acres), but the most common size was 2 leagues. The new owner was then required to have a local authority walk the land within him as he chose the exact boundaries of the desired land found within the diseño. In reality these steps were not always adhered to; documents might be missing and only a small fraction of ranchos went through the time and cost of being given possession by a local official.

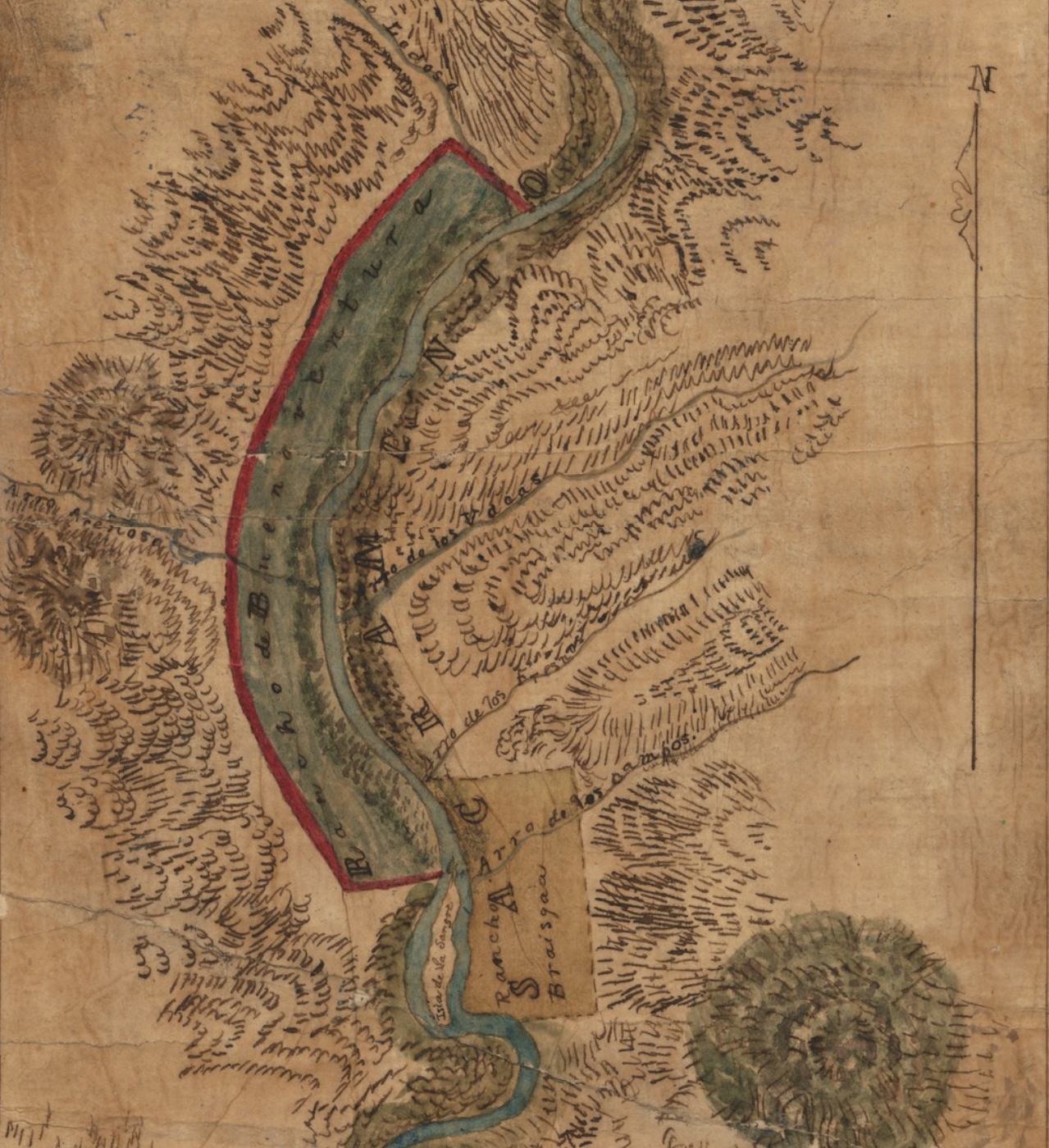
Diseño of Rancho Buena Ventura

There were no cattle fences in Alta California and herds tended to merge, split and wander across the valleys and into the hills. At a chosen time, a landowner would notify adjacent colindante (fellow rancheros) that all cattle on the property were to be gathered at a rodeo site and the colindante were obligated to be there to claim cattle with their brand and return them to the appropriate rancho. Weaned calves that were unbranded were the property of this landowner. After the rodeo, perhaps a few cattle would be selected for harvest, the hides going to the local ship merchants and the fat being rendered for future sale locally or by ship to as far away as Chile.

== U. S. Patents for Mexican Concessions ==
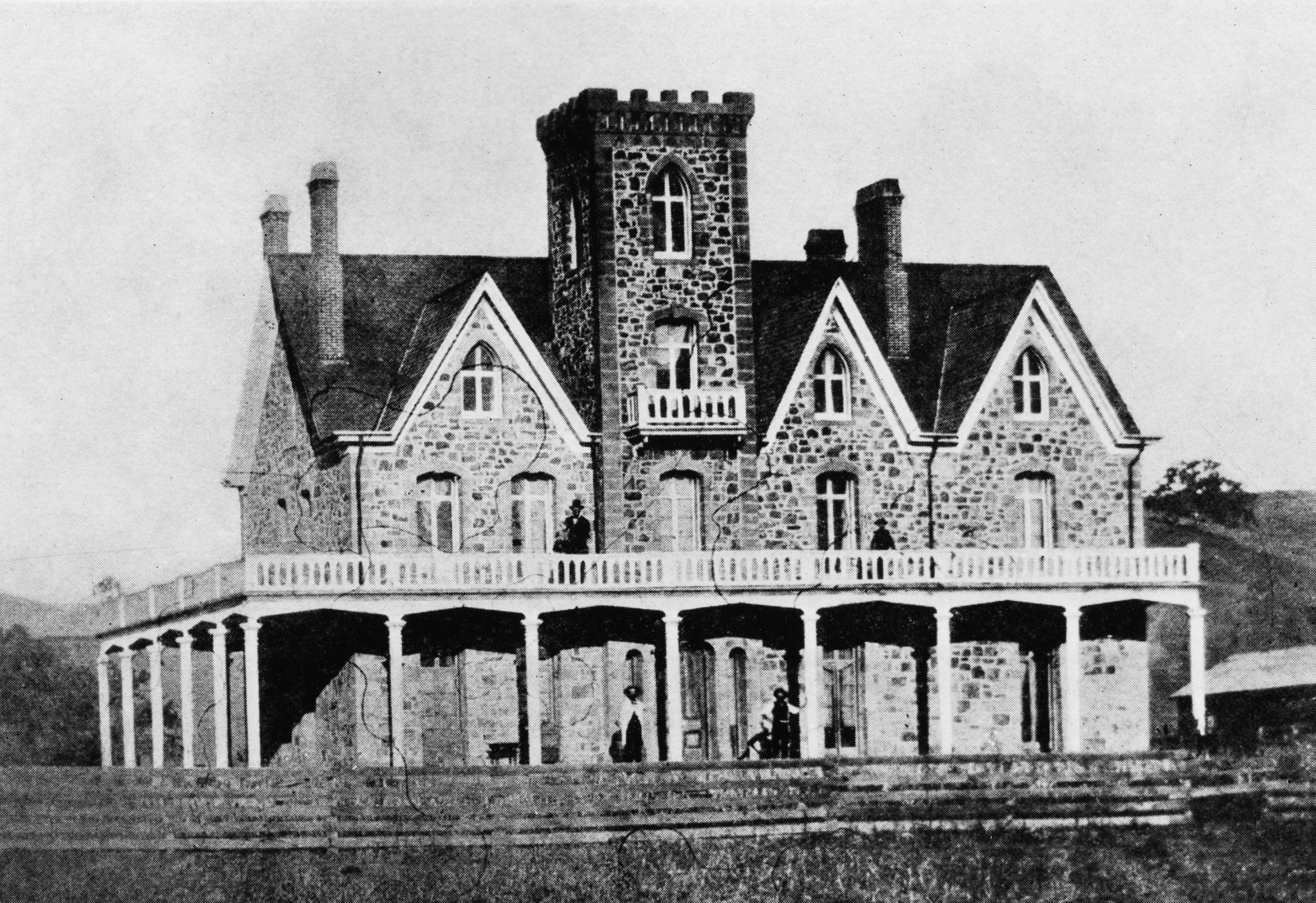
The Rancho Los Méganos mansion was built in 1856 by John Marsh.

Early Modern Western Europe maintained an idea of the "Law of Nations" which mandated that a new sovereign over a land was not to claim ownership of private property. For the United States the idea was codified for future states of the Southwest in the Treaty of Guadalupe Hidalgo, which ended the Mexican - American War. With the influx of hundreds of thousands of novice miners for the California gold rush, Congress passed "An Act to ascertain and settle the private Land Claims in the State of California" in 1851 which created a process to review Mexican land claims and integrate them into the U.S Township surveying standard. (See "California Land Act of 1851".)

=== Land claims ===
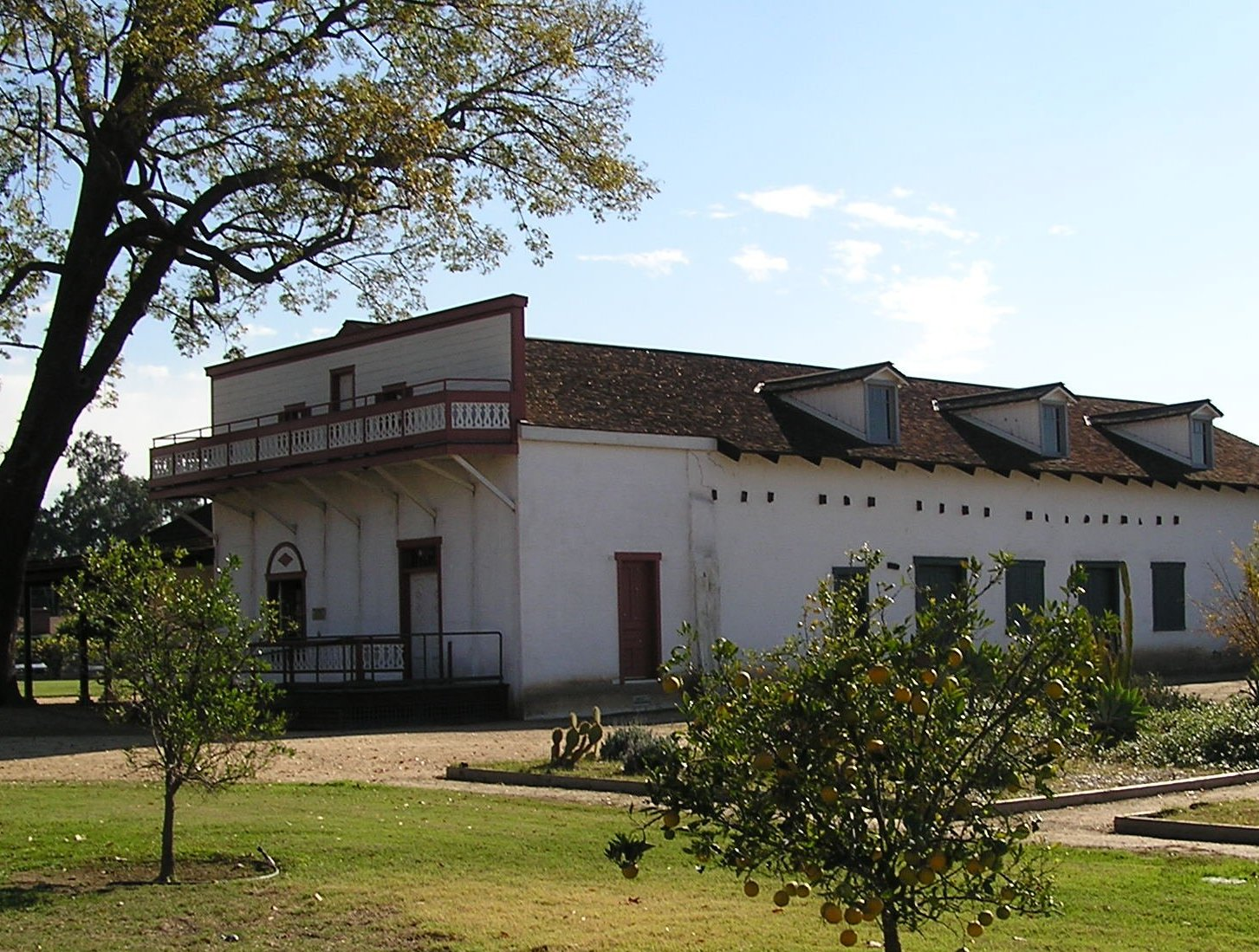
The Pico Adobe, built by Pío Pico in 1853 on Rancho Paso de Bartolo

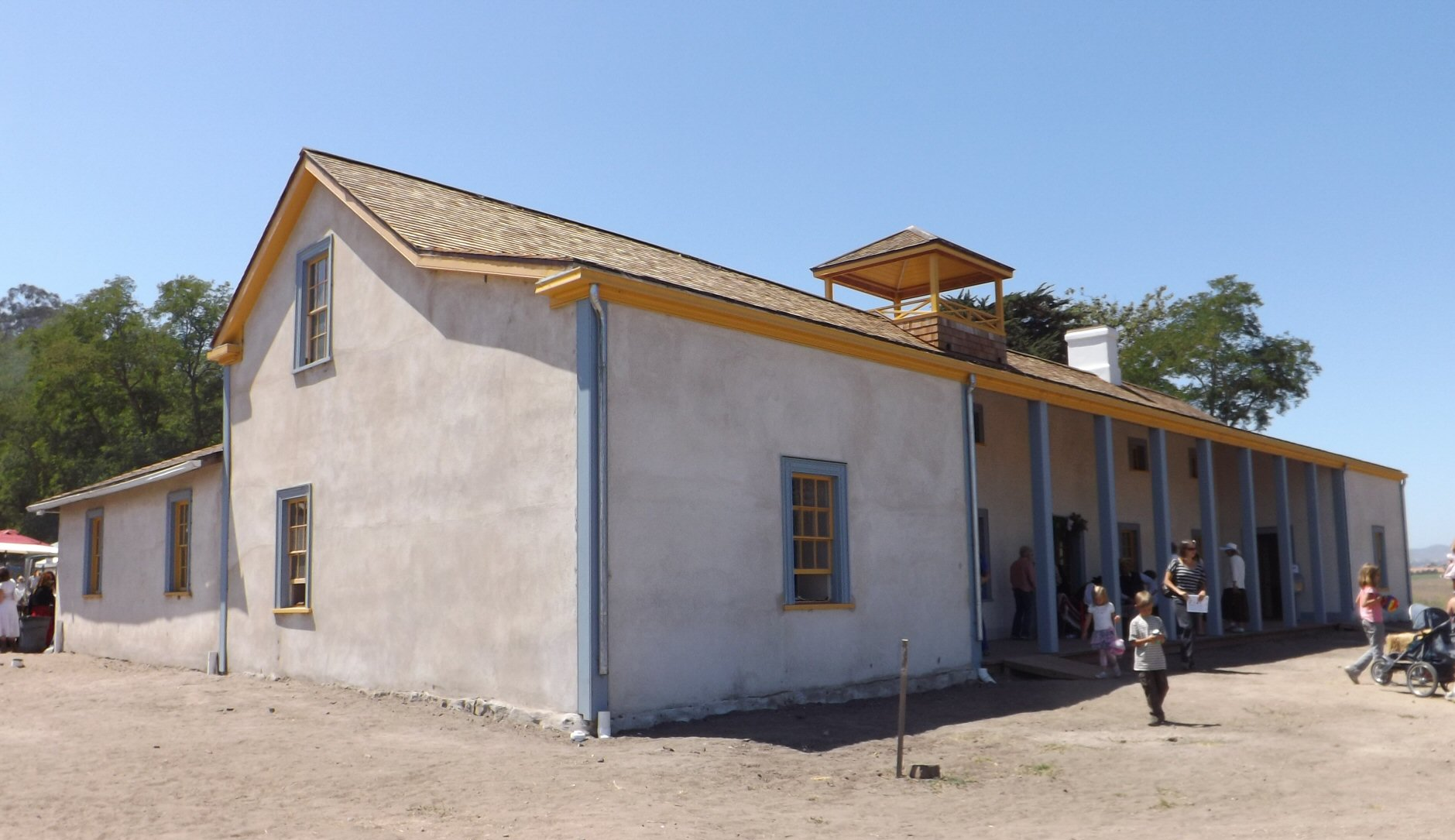
The Casa de Dana was built on Rancho Nipomo in 1839.

== Legacy ==
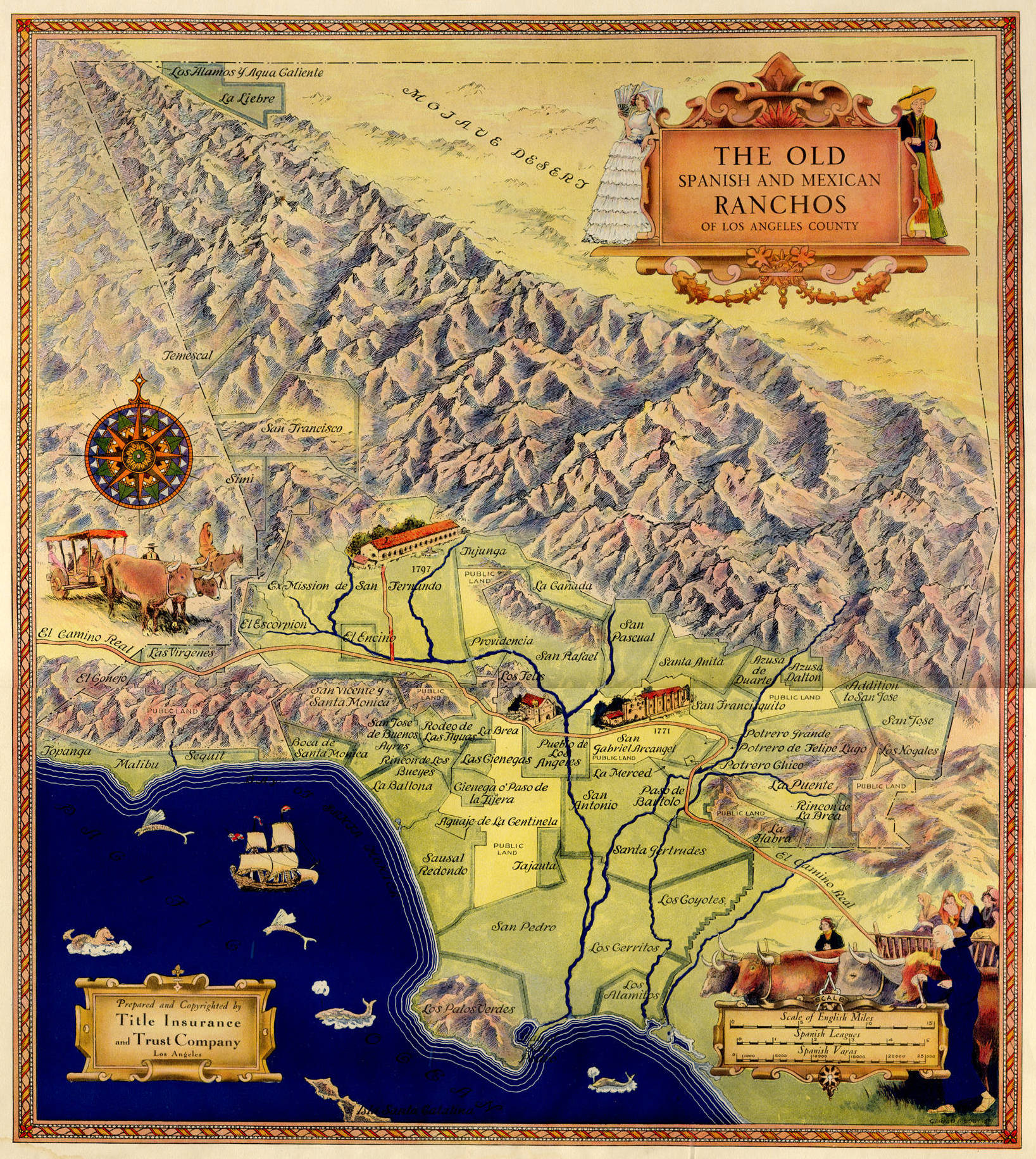
Map of the Spanish and Mexican rancho grants in Los Angeles County

With advancing urbanization, more and more rancho boundaries are being replaced with newer surveys of smaller tracts. Even in rural areas, ranchos have generally been subdivided into smaller, more manageable tracts.

Rancho Guejito in San Diego County is considered the last of the San Diego Ranchos to be undeveloped. Only a few historic structures and an 8,000 square feet (740 m^{2}) ranch house, built in the 1970s, occupy the 13,300 acres (5,400 ha). Benjamin Coates purchased the land in the 1970s after Governor Jerry Brown vetoed a purchase that would have made Guejito a state park. Coates purchased an additional 8,700 acres (3,500 ha) of surrounding land between the 1970s and his death in 2004. Coates and his wife Nancy both expressed their wishes that the Rancho remain undeveloped. After her death in 2006, ownership of the land passed to their daughter, who has since turned the land over to a trust, the Rancho Guejito Corp. which "has submitted a few plans to build homes or a medical campus on the Rancho Guejito property, but none of those proposals got past the early discussion stages." Its current focus is on wine production and site tours.

== See also ==
- Empresario, a person who had been granted land in Coahuila y Tejas similar to the Rancho system
- List of ranchos of California
- Spanish missions in California
- List of Spanish missions in California
- Land grants in New Mexico
- Bibliography of California history
- Outline of California history
