= William T. Hendrick House =

Historic house in California, United States

- William T. Hendricks House
- U.S. National Register of Historic Places
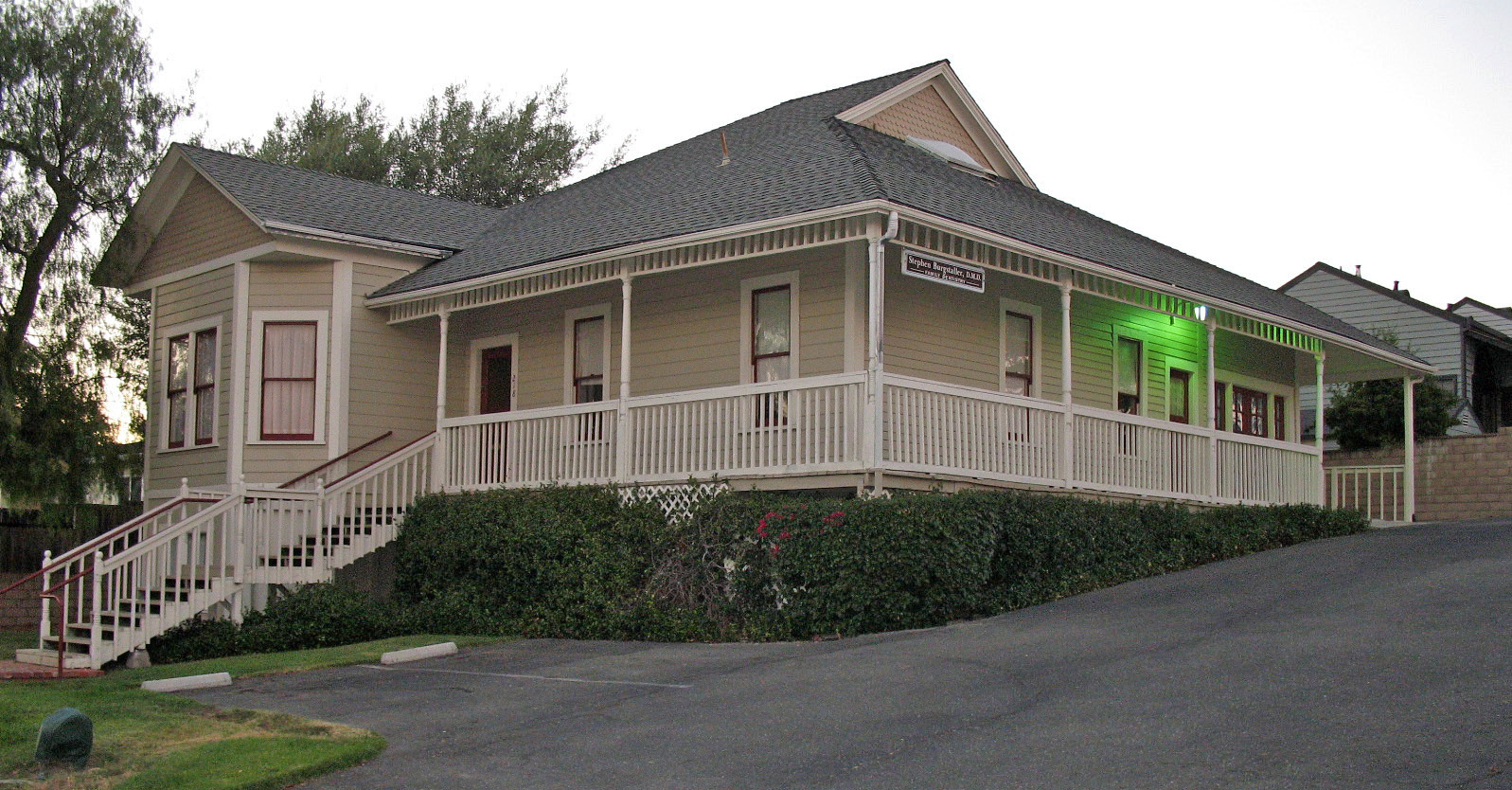
- 1857 portion closest; 1890s portion to the left

- Location within California Location within the United States
- Location: 218 Center Ave., Pacheco, California
- Coordinates: 37°59′1.03″N 122°04′12.44″W
- Area: 0.2 acres (0.081 ha)
- Built: 1857, 1890s
- Architectural style: Victorian: Queen Anne
- NRHP reference No.: 83001176
- Added to NRHP: September 8, 1983

The William T. Hendricks House, at 218 Center Ave in Pacheco, California, is a one-story house upon a raised basement, built in 1857. It was listed on the National Register of Historic Places in 1983.

In 1857 William Hendrick purchased a tract of land from a Mr. Loucks and on it erected a dwelling house and a flour mill. This mill was the only flour mill ever operated in Contra Costa County.

The house as built in 1857 in Queen Anne style was a rectangle 20 by 40 feet (6.1 m × 12.2 m) in plan with a porch all around; a detached kitchen was behind. The house was expanded in the 1890s to the west with an addition having a slanted bay window on its front, bringing the plan to 42 by 40 feet (13 m × 12 m).

The raised basement has gained a door and three windows which were not part of the early house.

== See also ==
- National Register of Historic Places listings in Contra Costa County, California
