= Grayson Creek =

Location
- Country: United States
- State: California
- Region: Contra Costa County, California
- Cities: Pacheco, California, Pleasant Hill, California

Physical characteristics
- Source: Briones Regional Park
  - coordinates: 37°56′21″N 122°07′26″W
  - elevation: 850 ft (260 m)
- Mouth: Pacheco Slough
  - location: Pacheco, California
  - coordinates: 38°00′16″N 122°03′41″W
  - elevation: 20 ft (6.1 m)

Basin features
- Tributaries
  - left: Grayson Creek West Fork
  - right: Grayson Creek Middle Fork (a.k.a. Murderer's Creek), Grayson Creek East Fork

Grayson Creek is a stream in Contra Costa County in northern California that flows northeasterly 7.4 miles (11.9 km) from its origin in Briones Regional Park to Pacheco Slough four miles east of Martinez. Pacheco Slough, in turn, connects to Suisun Bay. The Grayson Creek subwatershed is part of the Walnut Creek watershed and includes the cities of Pleasant Hill and Pacheco, California.

Grayson Creek West Fork begins at Briones Regional Park, crosses Grayson Road, and meanders through residential subdivisions until its confluence with Grayson Creek East Fork at Harriet Drive.

Grayson Creek East Fork parallels the East Bay Municipal Utility District Trail until Cleaveland Road, where it meanders through a field and residential subdivisions until its confluence with Grayson Creek Middle Fork at Gregory Lane.

Grayson Creek Middle Fork (a.k.a. Murderer's Creek or Murderous Creek) is a seasonal drainage creek also located in Pleasant Hill that begins at Briones Regional Park and meanders through residential subdivisions until its confluence with Grayson Creek East Fork. The term “Murderer’s Creek” was included by surveyors on an 1864 map, and although there are no historical sources that explain why the surveyors included this term, local lore is that at least one tree near this stream was used to murder Native Americans and that surveyors found a murdered Native American tribal member near the stream during their survey. The use of the term “Murderer’s Creek” has been long considered a negative and sensationalized reference, and the name "Grayson Creek Middle Fork" is often preferred today. Portions of the creek have disappeared, but it can be found meandering through several residential subdivisions below the hillside near Pleasant Hill Road and Withers Avenue, as well as near Boyd Road.

== Flood control and restoration ==
On January 10, 2017, Sequoia Elementary was flooded from water in the Grayson Creek. On New Year's Eve 2005, Grayson Creek East Fork and Grayson Creek Middle Fork overflowed, flooding approximately 80 homes and causing $2M-$3 M in damages (a 35-40 year rainfall event). In December 1997 the creeks also escaped their banks and flooded with a similar amount of damage during an 18-year storm event. Grayson Creek Middle Fork escaped its banks again on January 4, 2008. A United States Army Corps of Engineers Phase I Feasibility Study is ongoing to evaluate Grayson Creek Middle Fork and Grayson Creek East Fork for a federal flood control project that will improve flood protection in the highly populated floodplain, while leaving the creek in its natural state, to:

1. Reducing/eliminating the potential for future flooding;
2. Providing habitat for migratory birds, fish and other wildlife; and
3. Allowing for linkages with recreational and park land.

The current effort has evolved from a history of battles between environmentalists and government planners, beginning with a 1984 Contra Costa County Planning Department proposal to convert Grayson Creek East Fork and Grayson Creek Middle Fork to concrete lined channels. This led to the formation of a citizen's group called Friends of Creeks in Urban Settings or FOCUS (now an affiliate of the Urban Creeks Council), founded by Beverly Ortiz, a faculty lecturer of California State University, East Bay.

== See also ==
- List of watercourses in the San Francisco Bay Area
- North American beaver
