= Vicente Martínez Adobe =

19th century adobe residence in California

Coordinates: 37.9912°N 122.1337°W

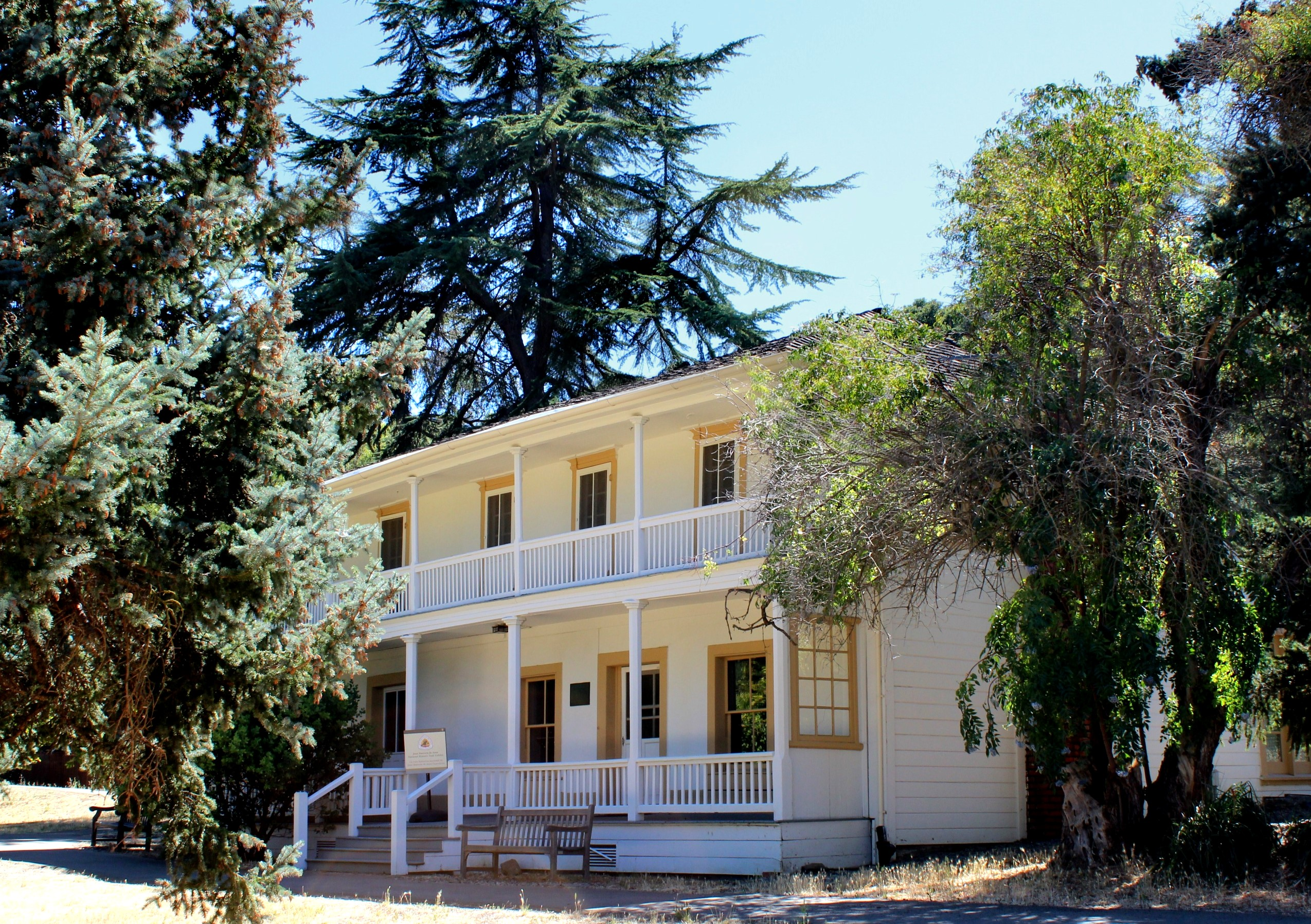
- Location: Alhambra Way & Hwy 4, Contra Costa County
- Built: 1849

California Historical Landmark
- Designated: September 24, 1953
- Reference no.: 511

The Vicente Martínez Adobe is an historic adobe house near Martinez, California. The house was built in 1849 by Vicente J. Martínez on the Rancho El Pinole, a land grant that had been given to his father, Ygnacio Martínez, in 1836. It was the first of its kind built in Contra Costa County. In 1853 the adobe was sold Edward Franklin, after whom the canyon where the adobe sits was named. The adobe became known as the Franklin Canyon Adobe.

The building is a two-story ranch house typical of Californian design in the mid-19th century. The walls of the house are of thick adobe brick, the foundation consists of rough-cut stone. An internal adobe wall divides each floor into two rooms. The front and southern sides of the house have wooden wrap-around porches at each level. Wood shingles of either cedar or redwood originally covered the roof.

The Martínez Adobe is now part of the John Muir National Historic Site and is open to the public.

== See also ==
- California Historical Landmarks in Contra Costa County
- National Register of Historic Places listings in Contra Costa County, California
