= Don Francisco Galindo House =

Historic house in California, United States

- U.S. National Register of Historic Places
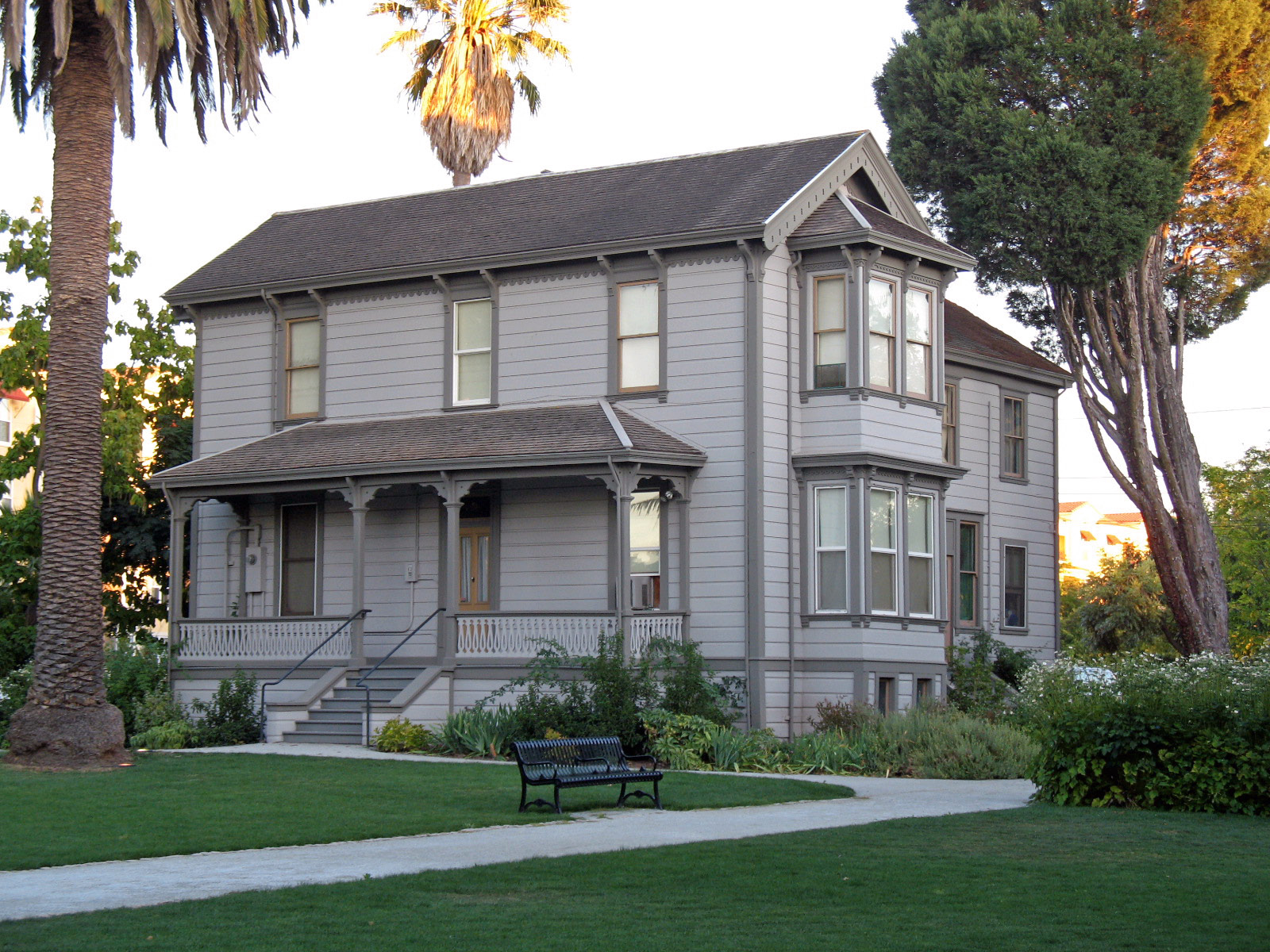
- Location: 1721 Amador Ave., Concord, California
- Coordinates: 37°58′24″N 122°2′1″W
- Area: 0.5 acres (0.20 ha)
- Built: 1856
- Architectural style: Greek Revival, Italianate
- NRHP reference No.: 88000553
- Added to NRHP: May 20, 1988

The Don Francisco Galindo House, known locally as the Galindo House and Gardens, is a 19th-century house in Concord, California built in 1856 by Francisco Galindo and his wife, Maria Dolores Manuela (Pacheco) Galindo, daughter of Salvio Pacheco who was the grantee of Rancho Monte del Diablo.

The house is one of the few remaining Victorian ranch houses in Contra Costa County. In 1875 it underwent significant remodeling resulting in an enlarged basement, first floor and second floor. It was around this time that Francisco and Maria's oldest son, Juan "John" Galindo, and his bride, Marina "Sarah" (Amador) Galindo, moved into the house.

In October 2001 the City of Concord created a Master Plan for the Galindo House, prepared by the historic preservation architectural firm Page & Turnbull of San Francisco, including a Museum Operating Plan.

In September 2010, ownership of the Galindo House and property transferred from the City of Concord to the Concord Historical Society, which spent the next two years renovating the house and opened it to the public in 2012.

In May 2013, the Society moved the city's Masonic Temple (which had been dedicated in October 1928) from its location at 1765 Galindo St. to the Galindo House property, facing Clayton Road, to become part of the Society's historical resource center and meeting facility.

== See also ==
- National Register of Historic Places listings in Contra Costa County, California
- Don Salvio Pacheco Adobe
