= Neroly Formation =

Geologic formation in California, United States

- Stratigraphic range: Neogene Period
- Type: Geologic formation
- Underlies: Pinole Tuff Formation

Location
- Region: Contra Costa County, California
- Country: United States

The Neroly Formation is a geologic formation in the East Bay region of the San Francisco Bay Area in California.

Areas it is found include western Contra Costa County.

It preserves fossils dating back to the Neogene period.

== See also ==
- List of fossiliferous stratigraphic units in California
- Paleontology in California
