= Salvio Pacheco Adobe =

19th century adobe residence in California

Don Salvio Pacheco Adobe
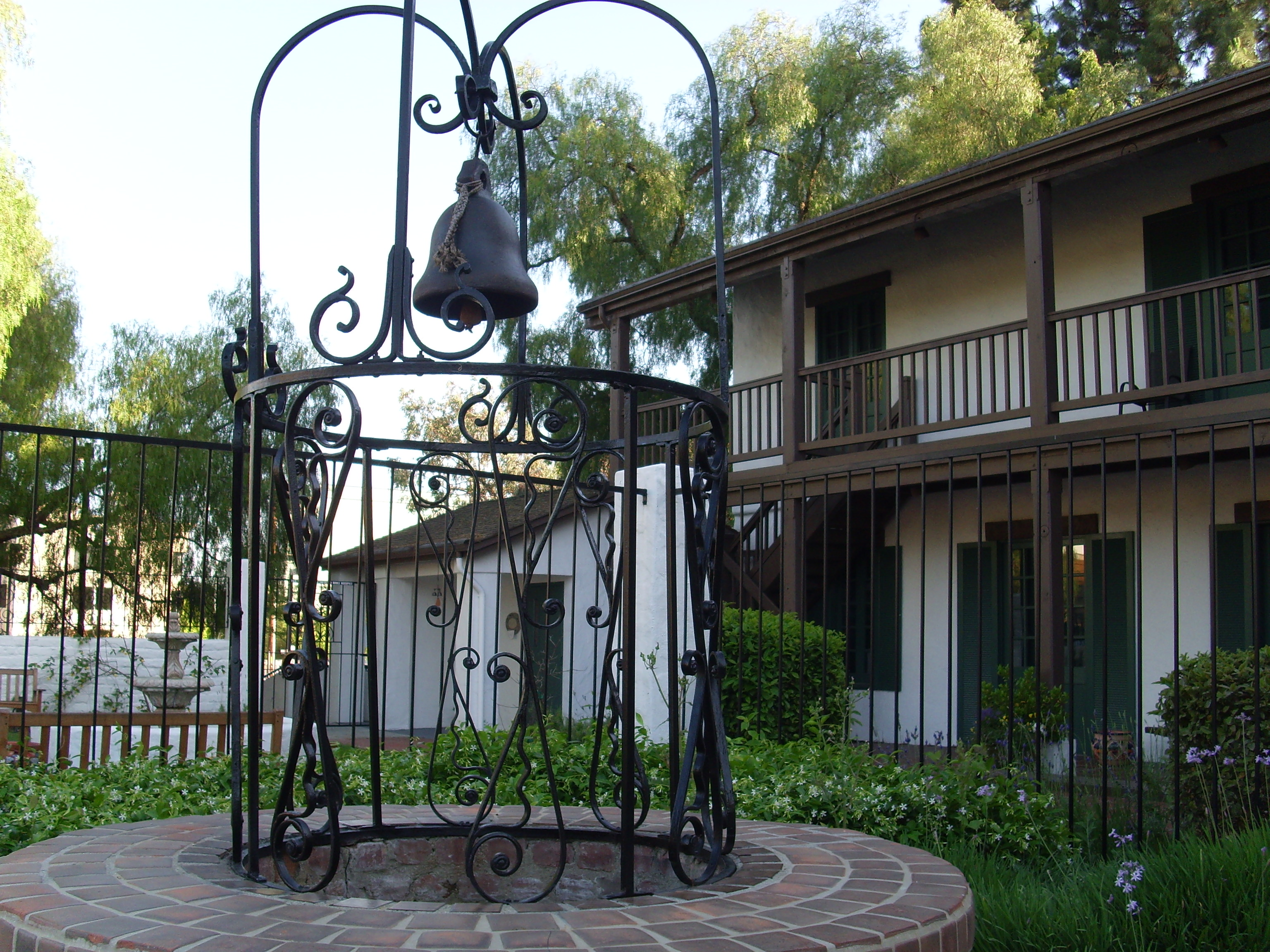
- Location: 1870 Adobe Street, Concord, California
- Coordinates: 37°58′35″N 122°2′16″W
- Built: 1835

California Historical Landmark
- Designated: November 25, 1953
- Reference no.: 515

The Salvio Pacheco Adobe is a historic adobe house in Concord, California. It was built in 1835 by Salvio Pacheco, a Californio ranchero with vast lands in Contra Costa.

== History ==
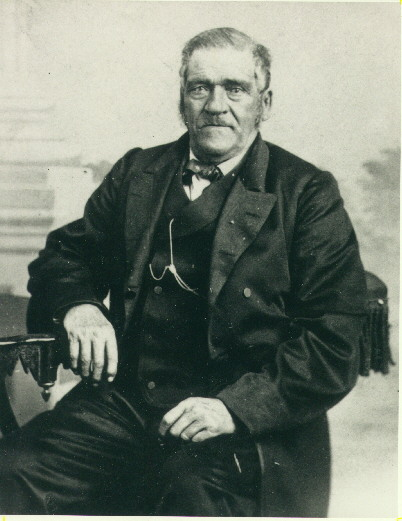
Salvio Pacheco, a Californio ranchero, built the adobe in 1835.

In 1834, Salvio Pacheco was awarded the Rancho Monte del Diablo Mexican land grant, including what is now known as Concord and parts of Pleasant Hill. On June 24, 1835, he completed this two-story adobe, the first building to be erected in Diablo Valley.

Pacheco gave the land surrounding this adobe to the refugees of the earthquake-flood of 1868, and the community—previously known as Todos Santos—became known as Concord.

== See also ==
- National Register of Historic Places listings in Contra Costa County, California
- Don Francisco Galindo House
