= Shannon-Williamson Ranch =

- Shannon Williamson Ranch
- U.S. National Register of Historic Places
- U.S. Historic district
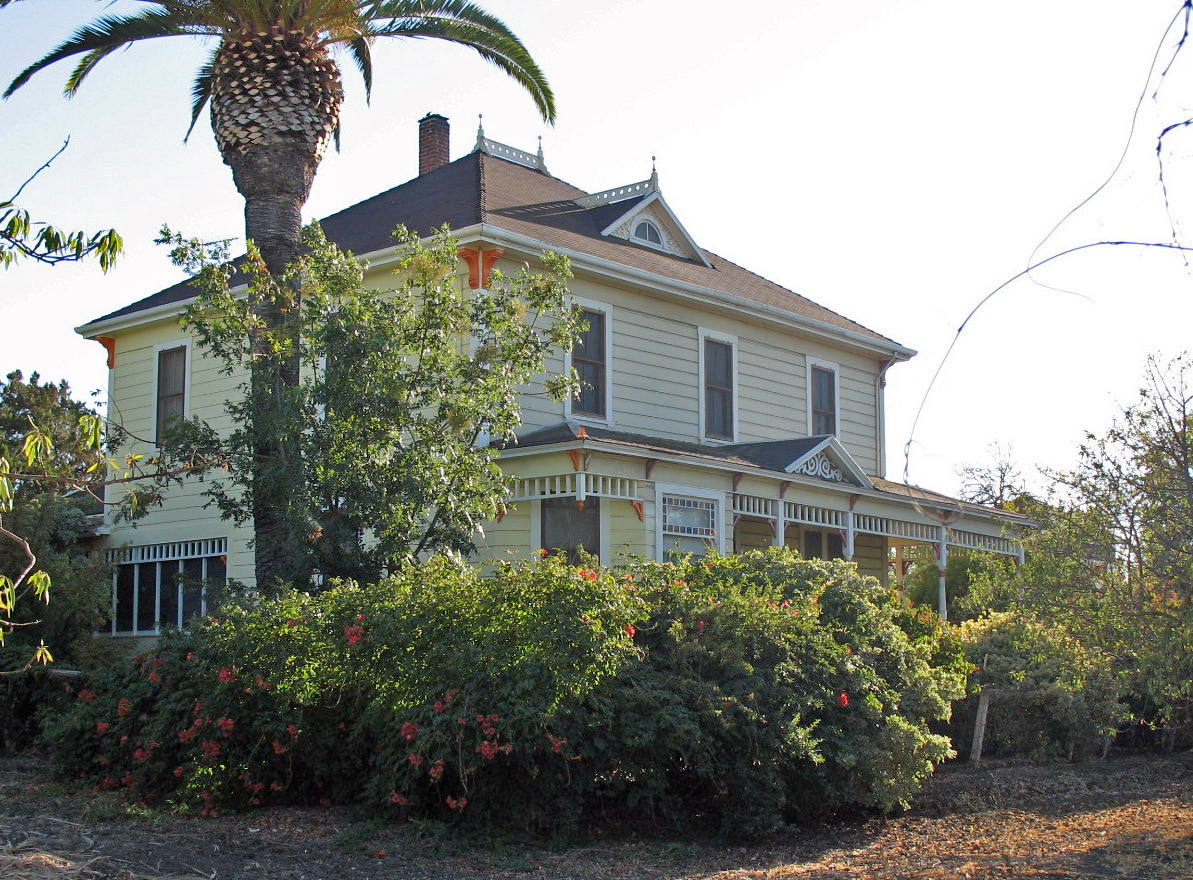

- Location within California Location within the United States
- Location: RR 1/Lone Tree Way, Antioch, California
- Coordinates: 37°57′40.73″N 121°45′45.33″W
- Area: 398 acres (161 ha)
- Architect: Williamson Family
- Architectural style: Italianate
- NRHP reference No.: 87000003
- Added to NRHP: January 29, 1987

The Shannon-Williamson Ranch, is located in Antioch, California. The Williamson family settled in Antioch in 1867. They were granted a homestead in 1874 signed by then U.S. President Ulysses S. Grant. The original house burned down in 1895. The current house that stands is the one that was rebuilt after the fire. The ranch operated from 1875 to 1949. The ranch was saved in 1987 by the efforts of one of the inhabitants of the house Donald Williamson. The once 4,000-acre (1,600 ha) ranch raised crops such as wheat, barley, hay, and livestock. The ranch currently retains approximately 3 acres (1.2 ha) of the former ranch including a two-story Italianate house, 3 barns and several other buildings including outbuildings and a small orchard. The ranch is currently closed to the public and there are currently no plans for the future of the house and property. The surrounding area has been named after the ranch such as the housing subdivision and the shopping mall directly across the street from it. The ranch property has a fence that surrounds the entire property.

== See also ==
- National Register of Historic Places listings in Contra Costa County, California
