= Briones Sandstone =

Geologic formation in California, US

Briones Formation
- Stratigraphic range: Miocene
- Type: Geologic formation
- Underlies: San Pablo Formation

Location
- Region: Contra Costa County, California
- Country: United States

Type section
- Named for: Briones Hills

The Briones Formation is a Late/Upper Miocene epoch geologic formation of the East Bay region in the San Francisco Bay Area, California.

It is found in western Contra Costa County.

== Geology ==
The formation preserves fossils dating back to the Late/Upper Miocene epoch of the Neogene period. Common fossils in the area include Spisula, Calyptraeidae, Clinocardium, and Simomactra falcata. The presence of shell beds and mollusk fossils suggests the area was once under a shallow bay, with relatively uniform levels of salinity and sand porosity. The shell beds form a conglomerate in a calcerous sandstone matrix; today, this conglomerate is a major component of notable geological features in the Bay Area, including Mission Peak.

The base of the formation includes sandstone and siltstone in distinct, parallel layers. The sandstone is unique in its relative coarseness and light coloration. Some areas also include a pebble conglomerate.

The Tularcitos syncline is a significant geological feature in the southern part of the formation. The high level of deformation, compared to the northern area, suggests that there was significant metamorphic activity, enabling the formation of laumontite.

The vegetation present in the area is primarily annual grasses and forbs. The soil, which is primarily composed of sand, is considered "excessively drained" because of its high permeability and high levels of runoff. Today, the land is used primarily for grazing.

The presence of rocks of the Briones formation near the surface creates conditions conducive for the development of chaparral and grasslands.

== See also ==
- Miocene California geology
- List of fossiliferous stratigraphic units in California
- Paleontology in California
