= Tucker House =

Historic house in California, United States

- U.S. National Register of Historic Places
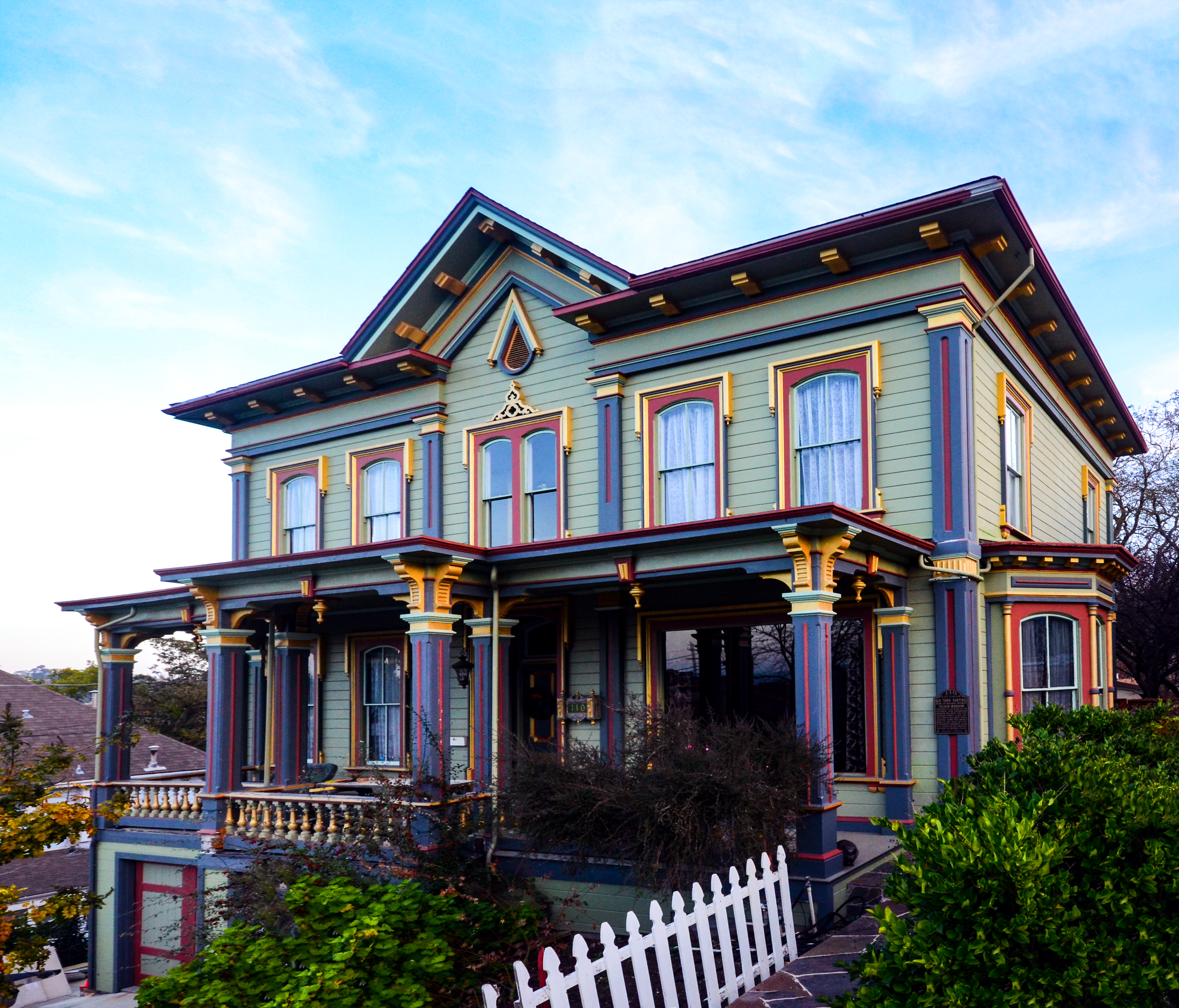

- Location within California Location within the United States
- Location: 110 Escobar Street, Martinez, California
- Coordinates: 38°0′54.91″N 122°8′28.39″W
- Area: 398 acres (161 ha)
- Architectural style: Italianate,
- NRHP reference No.: 99001563
- Added to NRHP: December 17, 1999

The Tucker House is located in Martinez, California. Originally located at 40 Escobar Street, this luxurious 4 story, 4 bedroom, 2 bath mansion was built for Captain John Tucker, a former sea captain from Nantucket, Massachusetts, who settled in Martinez, become a wheat farmer and built a mansion atop the hill on Escobar Street in 1877. (Note: The reason the Captain gave up seafaring to settle in an inland town is not known.) The persons who moved into the house included not only the Captain, but also his wife, Mary Swain Tucker, Mary's brother, SylvanusChange Sylvester Swain, Swain's wife and daughter, and a Chinese servant known only as Vu. On Halloween, October 31, 1880, Captain Tucker died. The house was moved to 110 Escobar St. in the 1920s by City Postmaster Franklin Glass. After the house had been moved, it had served as a bordello for a while during the 1920s and 30s.

== Revealing mysteries ==
According to a 2010 article in the San Jose Mercury News, a Martinez couple, Joey and Linda Piscitelli, both general contractors who restore houses for a living, decided to buy Tucker House in 2005. When they started cleaning up the old house, they began to discover various mysteries. When they opened the attic, they found that it had been divided into eight separate cubicles, each containing a mattress. This led them to do further research into the history of the house, revealing the secret of its use as a bordello.

The new owners found scores of old medicine bottles, in addition to an 1879 medical almanac. Researching historical records, the Piscitellis learned that the Pacific Medical and Surgical Journal had reported in 1874, that Martinez had experienced an epidemic of Scarlatina (better known today as scarlet fever). Only two of these cases were classed as serious. A young child who contracted the disease had died. The other case was Captain John Tucker, who survived. (Note: Scarlet fever ordinarily infects children aged 5 - 15 years)

== See also ==
- National Register of Historic Places listings in Contra Costa County, California
