= Old Borges Ranch =

- U.S. National Register of Historic Places
- U.S. Historic district
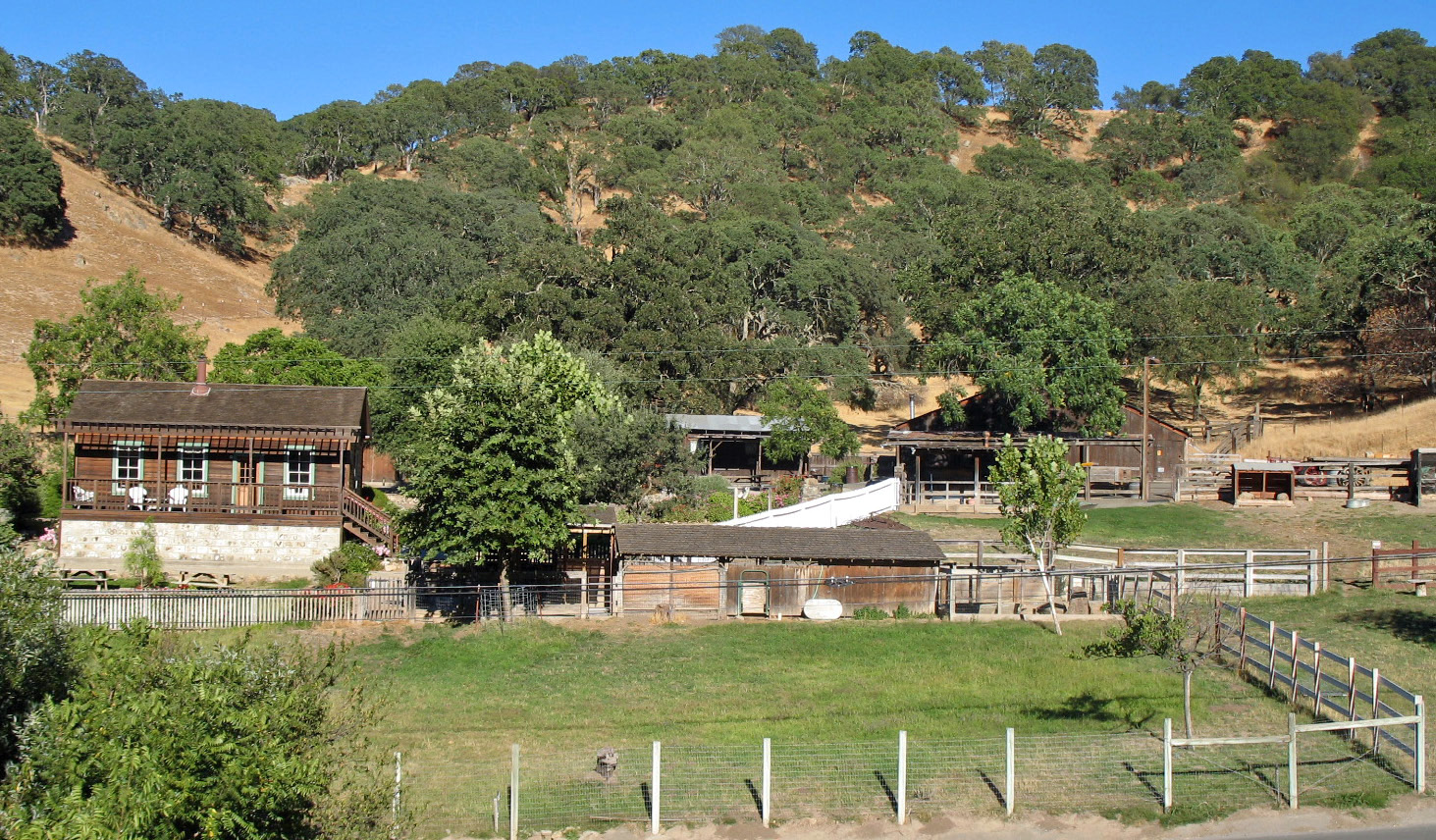
- Old Borges Ranch, August 2008

- Location within California Location within the United States
- Location: Contra Costa County, California
- Nearest city: Walnut Creek
- Coordinates: 37°53′24.4″N 122°0′9.08″W
- Area: 393.8 acres (159.4 ha)
- Architectural style: redwood
- NRHP reference No.: 81000147
- Added to NRHP: July 7, 1981

The Old Borges Ranch is a 1,035 acres (419 ha) historic district in the Mt. Diablo foothills within the 2,600-acre (1,100 ha) Walnut Creek Open Space in Contra Costa County, California. A former cattle ranch, Old Borges Ranch includes multiple historic buildings, a ranger station, farm animals, and access to trails.

== History ==
In 1899, Portuguese immigrant Francisco "Frank" Borges purchased 700 acres (280 ha) for a cattle ranch and home for his family: wife Mary Borges and their children. The ranch's farmhouse, constructed of redwood, was built in 1901. The family also built barns, a blacksmith shop, and a windmill. Five generations of the Borges family ended up living and working at the ranch.

Eventually, the ranch fell into disrepair. In 1974, voters in Walnut Creek approved a $6.75 million bond measure to preserve open space in the Diablo foothills, and in 1976, the city of Walnut Creek purchased the Borges Ranch. Ron White, previously with the National Park Service, was hired as Walnut Creek Open Space's first ranger and moved with his family to the property in 1978. After restoration, the ranch was added to the National Register of History Places in 1981.

== Features ==
The Old Borges Ranchouse, built in 1901, is a five-room redwood structure. It was restored as a historic house museum, with period furnishings and artifacts, including a cast-iron stove, and historical displays of the area in the early 1900s. It serves as a visitor center for the Walnut Creek Open Space parks.

Visitors can also see the original barns, blacksmith shop, windmill, antique tractors, and farm animals, including those raised by the Pleasant Hill 4-H.

A ranger station and ranger residence are also onsite.

== See also ==
- National Register of Historic Places listings in Contra Costa County, California
- Ranchos of Contra Costa County, California — pre-statehood Spanish & Mexican land grant ranches.
- Ranches on the National Register of Historic Places in California
