= Roswell Butler Hard House =

Historic house in California, United States

- U.S. National Register of Historic Places
- U.S. Historic district
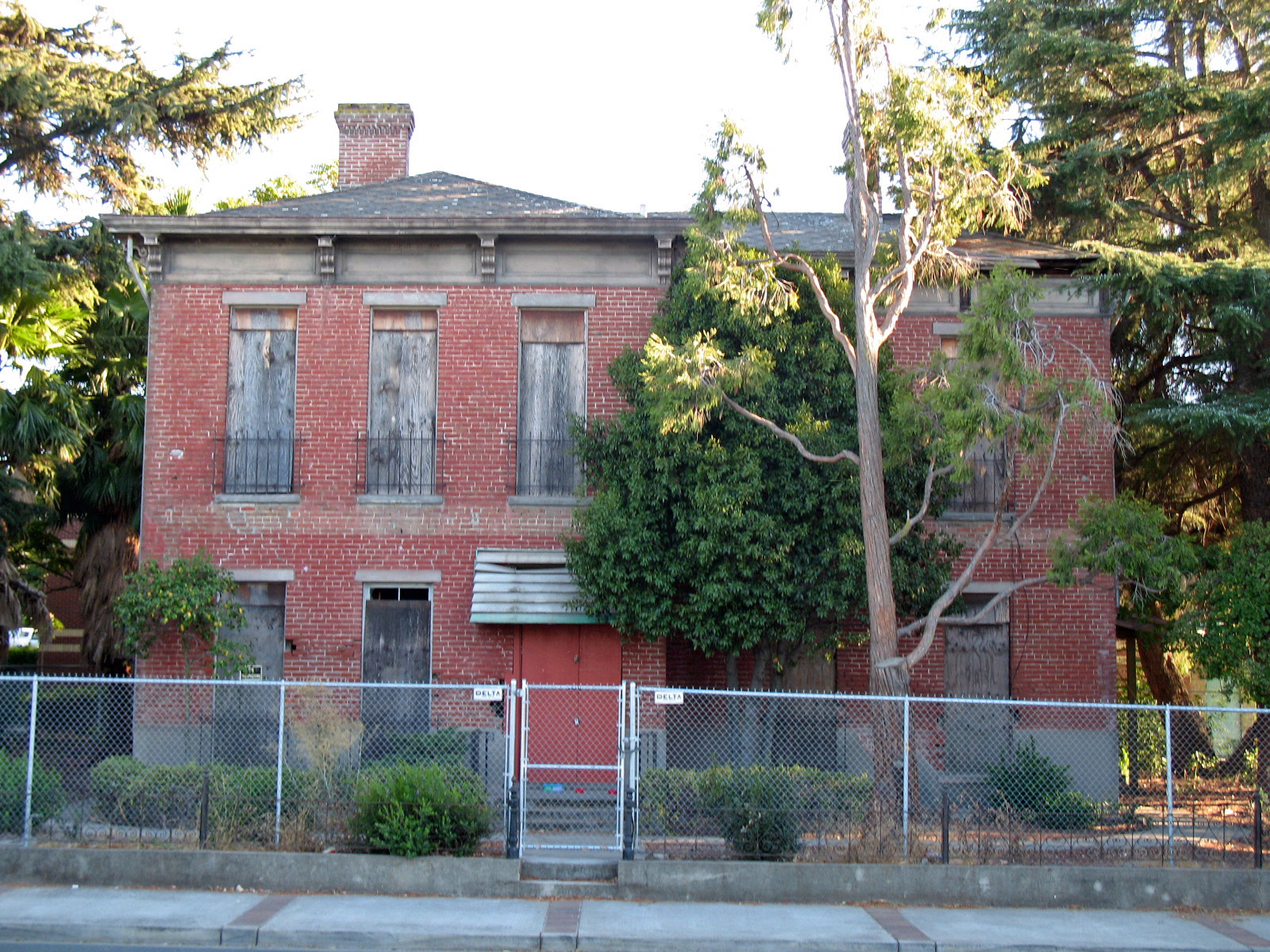

- Location within California Location within the United States
- Location: 815 W. First St., Antioch, California
- Coordinates: 38°01′03″N 121°48′59″W
- Area: less than one acre
- Architect: Roswell Butler Hard
- Architectural style: Italianate
- NRHP reference No.: 93001020
- Added to NRHP: September 30, 1993

The Roswell Butler Hard House is a house located at 815 W. First St. in Antioch, California. Roswell Butler Hard, a prominent early resident of Antioch, built the house in 1869. Hard was the first chairman of the Antioch town council, which originally met in his house; he also served as county sheriff and supervisor. The two-story Italianate house was built entirely from brick made in the city. It was split into smaller housing units after Hard's death; in 1979, the city of Antioch took ownership of the building, and it has fallen into disuse since.

The house was listed on the National Register of Historic Places on September 30, 1993.

== See also ==
- National Register of Historic Places listings in Contra Costa County, California
