= Maynard Buehler House =

Historic house in California, United States

- Maynard and Katherine Buehler House
- U.S. National Register of Historic Places
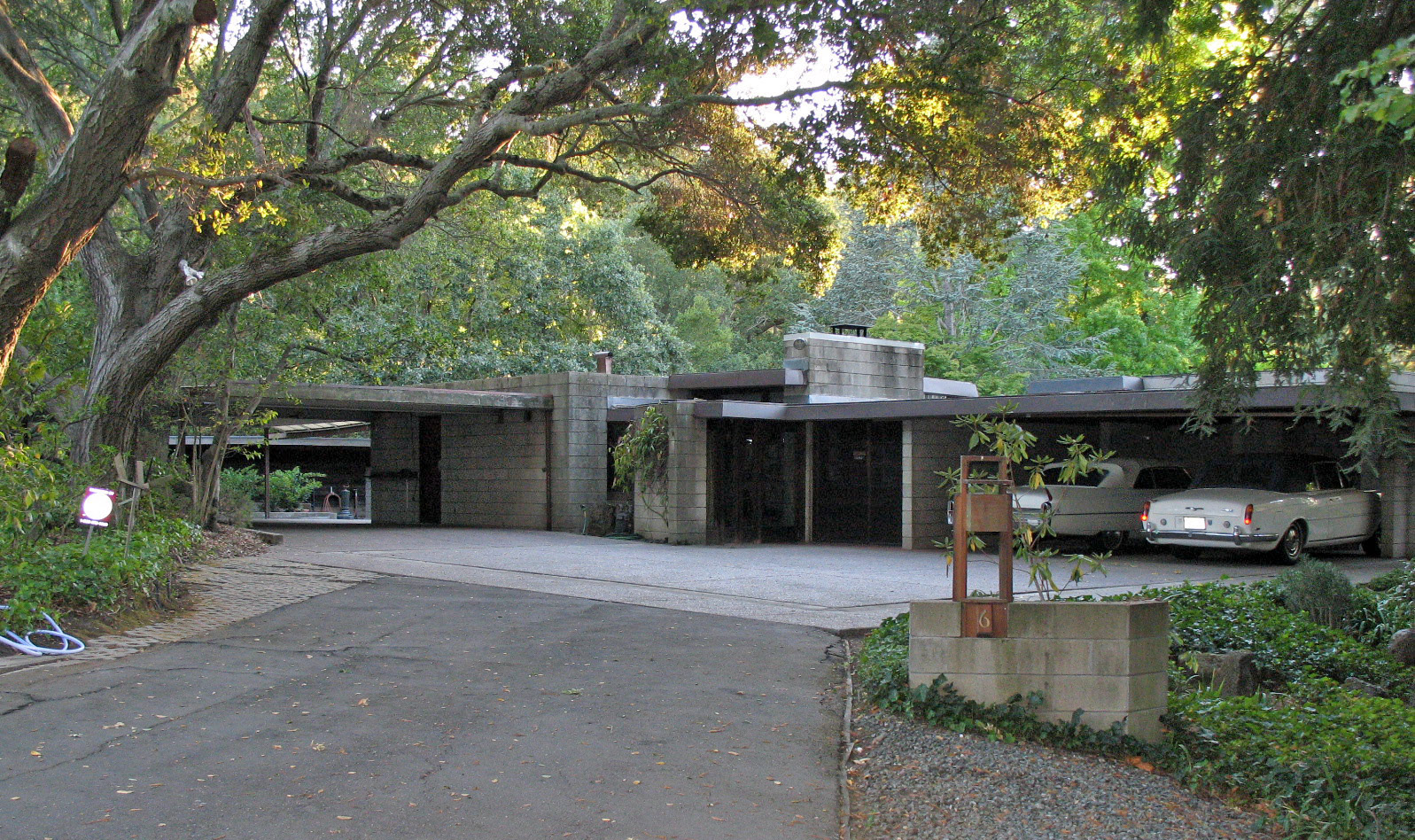
- Buehler House, by Frank Lloyd Wright

- Location within California Location within the United States
- Interactive map showing the Buehler House
- Location: 6 Great Oak Circle, Orinda, California
- Coordinates: 37°51′48″N 122°10′8.5″W
- Area: 4,000 sq ft (370 m^{2})
- Built: 1949
- Architect: Frank Lloyd Wright
- Architectural style: Modern Movement-Usonian
- NRHP reference No.: 06001118
- Added to NRHP: December 12, 2006

The Maynard Buehler House in Orinda, California is a 4,000 square feet (370 square meters) Usonian home designed by Frank Lloyd Wright in 1948 for Katherine Z. "Katie" and Maynard P. Buehler. Since 2016 the house has been used as a venue for weddings, after being featured in Vogue magazine.

== Description ==
=== Architecture ===
Much of the Maynard Buehler House is steel frame with redwood panel cladding; other portions are concrete block. Like many Usonian homes, the house has a distinct flat roof line, carports, underfloor heating, and is organized on a modular grid system on an L-shaped plan. The carport is cantilevered to the extreme engineering capacity. A prop was put at the corner during construction to prevent sagging. The roof was built two inches too high at that corner and when the prop was removed the roof settled right down to the proper level. This was a trademark of Wright: to take engineering to the extreme.

The long leg of the L houses a wing with three bedrooms, and a small workshop. At the hinge, a small kitchen with wood cabinets and a dark countertop served the family. The more public spaces – a living room, den, and dining room – are arranged at an oblique angle to the main wing. The octagonal living room opens onto a dramatic space, with a shed roof soaring over it. The sloped ceiling has a large rectangular gold leaf inset that reflects the natural light. The hallway leading to the bedrooms is of redwood batten, as are the walls in the bathroom. The kitchen, with its wood cabinets and dark counter top, is conveniently nestled near the center of the house. The smaller wing was designed to accommodate Mr. Buehler's need for a home office and machine shop for his firearm accessories business. He was known for machining the highest-quality mounts, bases, and rings for rifle scopes. The house also has a small basement, with openable lookout windows.

=== Furnishings ===
Wright designed a number of pieces of furniture for the house. They include a dining room set with the backs of the chairs that intentionally do not rise above the tabletop so as not to impede the view of the garden. The wooden dining table consists of triangular pieces that can be moved around and more pieces added to create a large setting for Thanksgiving and other holiday feasts. The living room has a built-in bench along the perimeter. Manuel Sandoval, who made the cabinetry and furniture for the V. C. Morris Gift Shop, also crafted the Buehler pieces.

=== Setting ===
The buildings are on 3.5 acres (14,000 square meters) of land transversed by a small stream, with two footbridges. The main house is surrounded with Japanese style gardens and a waterfall, designed by Henry Matsutani. There is an expansive lawn area that sprawls away from the main living area, with a guest house just below the main house, and there is a ceremonial Japanese tea house or chashitsu at the farthest reach of the property. Maynard filled in the patio swimming pool to create a Koi and water plants pond, including a biological filtering system.

The house was listed on the National Register of Historic Places on December 12, 2006.

== See also ==
- National Register of Historic Places listings in Contra Costa County, California
- List of Frank Lloyd Wright works
- List of Frank Lloyd Wright works by location
