= San Pablo Formation =

Geologic formation in California, United States

- Stratigraphic range: Miocene
- Type: Geologic formation
- Sub-units: Briones Sandstone, Cierbo Sandstone, Neroly Sandstone
- Underlies: Pinole Tuff Formation
- Thickness: 1,500 feet (460 m)

Location
- Region: Contra Costa County, California
- Country: United States

The San Pablo Formation is a Late/Upper Miocene epoch geologic formation of the East Bay region in the San Francisco Bay Area, California.

It is found on the south shore of San Pablo Bay, in western Contra Costa County.

== Geology ==
It is series of marine sandstones with tuffs and ashes. Its subunits, listed alphabetically, are Briones Sandstone, Cierbo Sandstone, Neroly Sandstone, and underlies the Pinole Tuff Formation.

It preserves fossils dating back to the Neogene period.

== See also ==
- Miocene California geology
- List of fossiliferous stratigraphic units in California
- Paleontology in California
