= Fernando Pacheco Adobe =

Historic house in California, United States

- Don Fernando Pacheco Adobe
- U.S. National Register of Historic Places
- U.S. Historic district
- California Historical Landmark
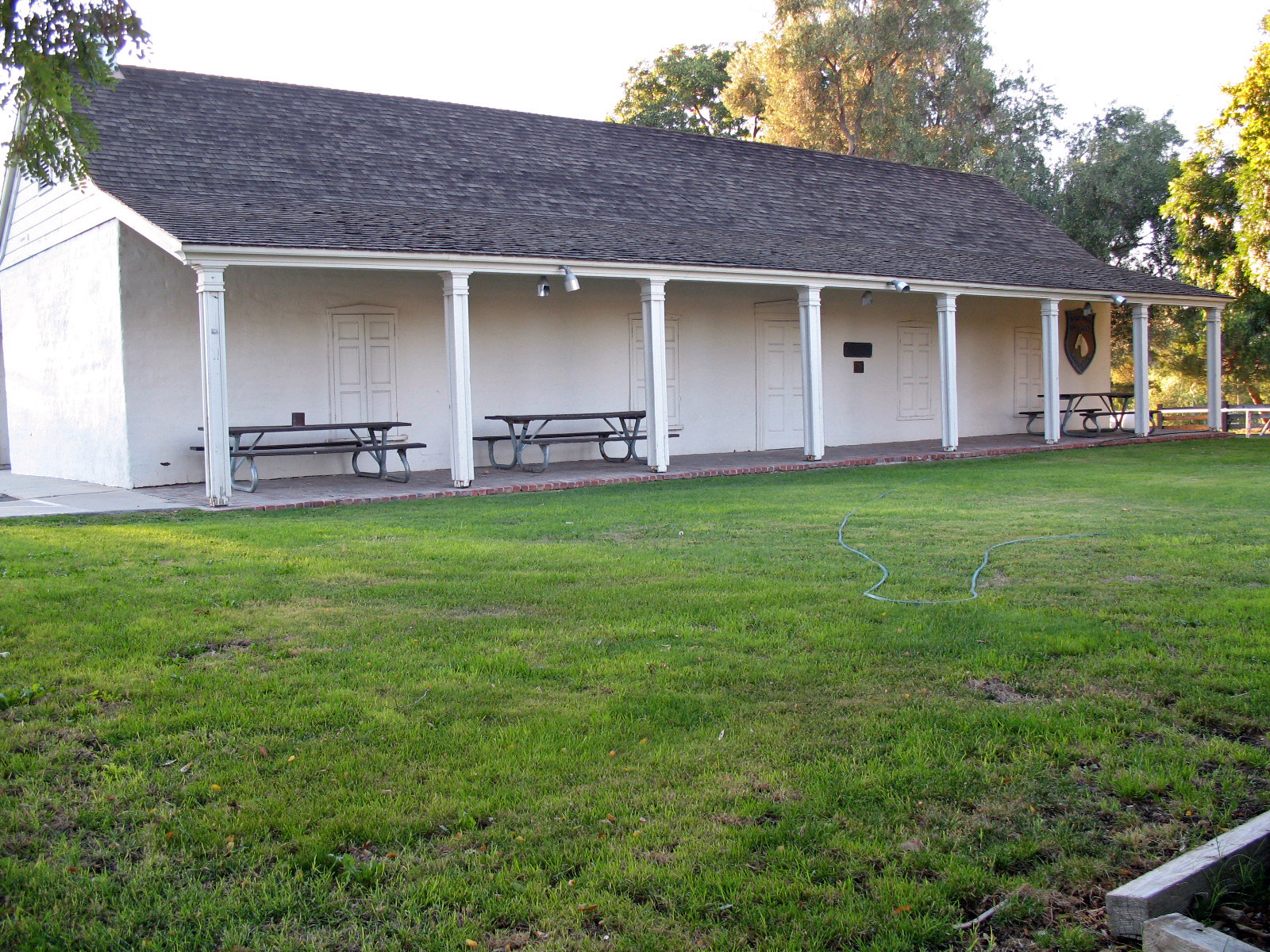

- Location within California Location within the United States
- Nearest city: Concord, California
- Coordinates: 37°59′46″N 122°2′33″W
- Area: 1.5 acres (0.61 ha)
- Architect: Miranda Brothers
- NRHP reference No.: 80000798
- CHISL No.: 455
- Added to NRHP: June 6, 1980

The Don Fernando Pacheco Adobe is located at 3119 Grant Street in Concord, California.The Fernando Pacheco Adobe is the only Concord landmark listed in all three Historical Registries: entry on the National Register occurred on June 6, 1980; the California Registered landmark number is 455; and the Concord Historical Landmark designation is 1-26-26/5458. The Adobe was built by Don Fernando in the early 1850s as the base of operations for his growing ranch activities, and as his family's formal residence. Fernando was the oldest son of Don Salvio Pacheco. He was born on May 30, 1818, while his father was assigned to a Militia-Guard unit at the Pueblo of San Jose. At age 17, he was sent to take possession and mark the boundaries of his father's 17,921 acre land grant. Fernando was given 1,500 acres as initial share of the rancho. He subsequently married Pasquala (Figeroa) (Juarez) – a widow. Their six children: Pedro, Bonifacio, Cipriana, Maria Asuncion (who married Jose Julian Cantua), Librada and Bersabe were raised at the Adobe. Don Fernando's family enjoyed a reputation as gracious hosts. They were famous for their generosity and extensive fiestas on Adobe's then lush, well irrigated grounds. The Adobe's 32” thick walls were built of local adobe – mud.

Ownership remained with Don Fernando's descendants until 1918. The land and adobe were then sold to the California Water Service Company; it then was essentially abandoned. In 1940 title to 2 and 1/2 acres and the deteriorated adobe structure transferred to Contra Cost County, which leased it to the Horsemen's Association. The Horsemen undertook a major rehabilitation, and used the then remote facility and corral for their headquarters. In 1979, the country transferred the Adobe and its grounds to its current owner, the City of Concord. In the early 1980s the Horsemen, the city, and the Concord Historical Society completed another restoration effort to stabilize the landmark Adobe. The Horsemen's Association continues activities on site. The Fernando Pacheco Adobe is located at 3119 Grant Street, now well within the city limits. It is adjacent to Hillcrest Park and the De Anza Expedition Memorial marker.

== See also ==
- National Register of Historic Places listings in Contra Costa County, California
- List of California Historical Landmarks
