= Pinole Tuff Formation =

Geologic formation in California, United States

- Stratigraphic range: Neogene
- Type: Geologic formation
- Underlies: Orinda Formation, Monterey Formation Group units
- Overlies: Neroly Formation; San Pablo Formation
- Thickness: 270 metres (890 ft)

Lithology
- Primary: Tuff, breccia

Location
- Region: Contra Costa County; California
- Country: United States

Type section
- Named for: Pinole, California

The Pinole Tuff Formation is a geologic formation of the East Bay region of the San Francisco Bay Area in California.

It is found near Pinole and Rodeo area at San Pablo Bay and the Briones Hills of western Contra Costa County.

Fossils

It preserves fossils, including Oncorhynchus rastrosus and fragments of a proto-hipparion prehistoric horse, dating back to the Neogene period.

== See also ==
- List of fossiliferous stratigraphic units in California
- Paleontology in California
