= Rancho Monte del Diablo =

Mexican land grant in California

Coordinates: 38.020°N 122.030°W

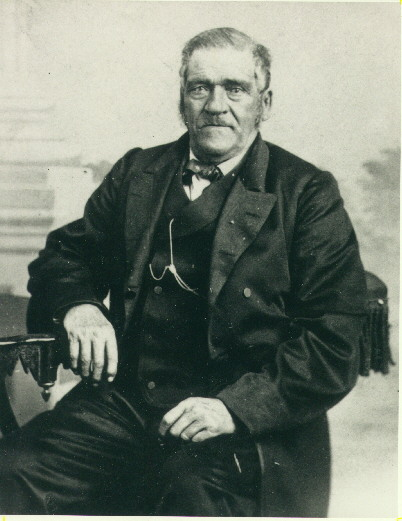
Rancho Monte del Diablo was granted in 1834 to Salvio Pacheco, a noted Californio ranchero.

Rancho Monte del Diablo (Devil's Mount Ranch in Spanish) was a 17,921-acre (72.52 km^{2}) Mexican land grant in present-day Contra Costa County, California given in 1834 by Governor José Figueroa to Salvio Pacheco. The name "Monte del Diablo" means "mountain of the devil" in Spanish. The grant covered the area from the Walnut Creek channel east to the hills, and generally from the Mount Diablo foothills north along Lime Ridge to Avon on the Carquinez Strait of the Sacramento River, and included present day Concord and parts of Pleasant Hill. Pacheco and Clayton are outside of the Rancho Monte del Diablo grant.

== History ==
Juan Salvio Pacheco II (1793–1876) was the grandson of Juan Salvio Pacheco (1729–1777) and Maria Carmen del Valle, who came to California with the Anza Expedition in 1776. Salvio Pacheco II, son of Ygnacio Bernardino Pacheco, was born in San Jose and enlisted in the military, serving at the Presidio of Monterey and the Presidio of San Francisco. In 1827, Pacheco was serving as a senior civil servant at the Pueblo of San José. When Pacheo received the grant in 1834, his son, Fernando Pacheco, was sent to occupy the grant and begin cattle operations. Salvio Pacheco did not move the rest of his family to the rancho until 1846.

With the cession of California to the United States following the Mexican-American War, the 1848 Treaty of Guadalupe Hidalgo provided that the land grants would be honored. As required by the Land Act of 1851, a claim for Rancho Monte del Diablo was filed with the Public Land Commission in 1852, and the grant was patented to Salvio Pacheco in 1859.

Salvio Pacheco married Maria Juana Flores in 1817 and had a family of five children – Fernando Pacheco, Maria Dolores Manuela Galindo, Sarah Amador, Salvador Pacheco, and Maria Concepcion Soto. Pacheco, California was named for Salvio Pacheco.

== Historic sites of the Rancho ==
- Don Salvio Pacheco Adobe. Two-story adobe built in 1846.
- Fernando Pacheco Adobe. The site of the adobe house constructed in 1843 by Fernando Pacheco (and reconstructed in 1941).
- Don Francisco Galindo House. The Galindo house was built in 1856 for Francisco Galindo and his wife, Maria Dolores Manuela Pacheco. Galindo moved to the Rancho Monte del Diablo and he purchased over 5,000 acres (20.2 km^{2}) from Salvio.
