= National Register of Historic Places listings in Contra Costa County, California =

Location of Contra Costa County in California

This is a list of the National Register of Historic Places listings in Contra Costa County, California.

This is intended to be a complete list of the properties and districts on the National Register of Historic Places in Contra Costa County, California, United States. Latitude and longitude coordinates are provided for many National Register properties and districts; these locations may be seen together in an online map.

There are 49 properties and districts listed on the National Register in the county, including 1 National Historic Landmark.

This National Park Service list is complete through NPS recent listings posted November 13, 2026.

== Current listings ==
	Name on the Register	Image	Date listed	Location	City or town	Description
1	Alvarado Park	Alvarado Park	April 9, 1992 (#92000313)	Jct. of Marin and Park Aves. 37°57′10″N 122°19′10″W	Richmond	
2	Atchison Village Defense Housing Project, Cal. 4171-x	Atchison Village Defense Housing Project, Cal. 4171-x	May 30, 2003 (#03000473)	Roughly bounded by MacDonald Ave., Ohio St., First St., and Garrard Blvd. 37°55′58″N 122°22′12″W	Richmond	Atchison Village page at Rosie the Riveter Trust website with information about its history. The page also includes a link to the NRHP nomination form.
3	Bank of Pinole	Bank of Pinole	October 24, 1996 (#96001175)	2361 San Pablo Ave. 38°00′20″N 122°17′25″W	Pinole	
4	Black Diamond Mines	Black Diamond Mines	October 2, 1991 (#91001425)	Somersville Rd. southeast of Antioch; 37°57′01″N 121°51′25″W	Antioch	
5	Borland House	Borland House	April 2, 2015 (#15000120)	1005 Escobar St. 38°01′09″N 122°08′05″W	Martinez	First property listed under the Multiple Property Submission "Historic Resources of Martinez, California" also accepted to the National Register of Historic Places April 2015.
6	Maynard and Katharine Buehler House	Maynard and Katharine Buehler House	December 12, 2006 (#06001118)	6 Great Oak Circle; 37°51′47″N 122°10′09″W	Orinda	Frank Lloyd Wright house
7	CA-CCO-548	CA-CCO-548	September 25, 2012 (#12000808)	Marsh Creek State Historic Park; 37°53′27″N 121°43′22″W	Brentwood	Prehistoric Native American habitation & burial site (CA-CCO-15/548).
8	Chinese Shrimp Camp		December 28, 2020 (#100005934)	Address restricted	Richmond	
9	Clayton Vineyards-DeMartini Winery	Clayton Vineyards-DeMartini Winery	August 30, 1984 (#84000767)	5919 Clayton Rd. 37°56′35″N 121°56′11″W	Clayton	
10	Contra Costa County Courthouse Block	Contra Costa County Courthouse Block	December 28, 1989 (#89002113)	625 Court St. 38°01′07″N 122°08′04″W	Martinez	The original courthouse building at 625 Court St. is now the Contra Costa County Finance Building
11	Contra Costa County Hall of Records	Contra Costa County Hall of Records	September 13, 1991 (#91001385)	725 Court St. 38°01′07″N 122°07′55″W	Martinez	Now the Contra Costa County Courthouse
12	Danville Southern Pacific Railroad Depot	Danville Southern Pacific Railroad Depot	August 16, 1994 (#94000860)	355 Railroad Ave. 37°49′15″N 122°00′02″W	Danville	
13	Robert Stanley Dollar Sr. House	Robert Stanley Dollar Sr. House	July 9, 2013 (#13000472)	1015 Stanley Dollar Dr. 37°51′44″N 122°04′03″W	Walnut Creek	
14	East Brother Island Light Station	East Brother Island Light Station	February 12, 1971 (#71000138)	On East Brother Island west of Point San Pablo; 37°57′48″N 122°25′57″W	Richmond	
15	Bernardo Fernandez House	Bernardo Fernandez House	April 11, 1973 (#73000399)	100 Tennent Ave. 38°00′40″N 122°17′45″W	Pinole	
16	Ford Motor Company Assembly Plant	Ford Motor Company Assembly Plant	June 23, 1988 (#88000919)	1414-1422 Harbour Way, S. 37°54′40″N 122°21′22″W	Richmond	
17	Forest Home Farms	Forest Home Farms	June 28, 2002 (#02000677)	19953 San Ramon Valley Blvd. 37°44′06″N 121°57′00″W	San Ramon	
18	Don Francisco Galindo House	Don Francisco Galindo House	May 20, 1988 (#88000553)	1721 Amador Ave. 37°58′24″N 122°02′05″W	Concord	
19	ROBERT GRAY (hydrographic survey vessel)		June 27, 2022 (#100007817)	800 Wharf St. 37°55′17″N 122°22′19″W	Richmond	
20	Roswell Butler Hard House	Roswell Butler Hard House	September 30, 1993 (#93001020)	815 W. First St. 38°01′03″N 121°49′00″W	Antioch	Antioch Press article about the Hard House
21	William T. Hendrick House	William T. Hendrick House	September 8, 1983 (#83001176)	218 Center Ave. 37°59′01″N 122°04′12″W	Pacheco	
22	Hercules Village	Hercules Village	August 22, 1980 (#80000799)	Kings, Railroad, Santa Fe and Hercules Aves., Talley Way, Bay and Pinole Sts. 38°01′01″N 122°17′21″W	Hercules	
23	Tilden Park Merry-Go-Round	Tilden Park Merry-Go-Round	September 29, 1976 (#76000480)	East of Berkeley in Tilden Regional Park; 37°54′05″N 122°15′21″W	Berkeley	
24	John Muir National Historic Site	John Muir National Historic Site	October 15, 1966 (#66000083)	4202 Alhambra Ave. 37°59′29″N 122°07′49″W	Martinez	
25	John Marsh House	John Marsh House	October 7, 1971 (#71000136)	Marsh Creek State Historic Park; 37°53′31″N 121°43′23″W	Brentwood	John Marsh House
26	Martinez City Library	Martinez City Library	January 31, 2008 (#07001467)	740 Court St. 38°01′04″N 122°08′03″W	Martinez	
27	Martinez Downtown Post Office	Martinez Downtown Post Office	May 8, 2012 (#12000265)	815 Court St. 38°01′04″N 122°08′00″W	Martinez	part of the US Post Office in California 1900-1941 Thematic Resource
28	Martinez Grammar School Annex		September 14, 2018 (#100002957)	525 Henrietta St. 38°00′50″N 122°08′06″W	Martinez	Now Martinez City Hall.
29	Memorial Hall	Memorial Hall	February 25, 2014 (#14000013)	Pomona St. at Alexander Ave. 38°03′10″N 122°12′35″W	Crockett	
30	Charles W. Merrill House	Charles W. Merrill House	April 7, 2005 (#05000251)	407 Camino Sobrante; 37°53′51″N 122°11′17″W	Orinda	
31	Moraga Adobe	Moraga Adobe	March 16, 1972 (#72000223)	24 Adobe Lane; 37°50′36″N 122°09′09″W	Orinda	
32	New Hotel Carquinez	New Hotel Carquinez	May 7, 1992 (#92000466)	410 Harbour Way; 37°56′14″N 122°21′34″W	Richmond	
33	Nystrom Elementary School/The Maritime Building		October 2, 2017 (#100001662)	230 Harbor Way S. 37°55′41″N 122°21′36″W	Richmond	
34	Old Borges Ranch	Old Borges Ranch	July 7, 1981 (#81000147)	1035 Castlerock Rd. 37°53′24″N 122°00′09″W	Walnut Creek	
35	Don Fernando Pacheco Adobe	Don Fernando Pacheco Adobe	June 6, 1980 (#80000798)	3119 Grant St. 37°59′46″N 122°02′33″W	Concord	
36	Point Richmond Historic District	Point Richmond Historic District	November 5, 1979 (#79000472)	Off CA 17; 37°55′34″N 122°23′07″W	Richmond	
37	Port Chicago Naval Magazine National Memorial	Port Chicago Naval Magazine National Memorial	October 28, 2009 (#11000237)	4202 Alhambra Ave. 38°03′27″N 122°01′47″W	Martinez	
38	Port Costa School	Port Costa School	May 25, 1988 (#88000563)	Plaza El Hambre; 38°02′41″N 122°11′19″W	Port Costa	
39	Richmond Shipyard Number Three	Richmond Shipyard Number Three	April 28, 2000 (#00000364)	Point Potrero; 37°54′27″N 122°21′59″W	Richmond	
40	Riverview Union High School Building	Riverview Union High School Building	October 14, 1998 (#98001243)	1500 W. 4th St. 38°00′59″N 121°49′36″W	Antioch	
41	Patrick Rodgers Farm	Patrick Rodgers Farm	March 22, 1991 (#91000305)	315 Cortsen Rd. 37°56′35″N 122°05′13″W	Pleasant Hill	
42	Rosie the Riveter-World War II Home Front National Historical Park	Rosie the Riveter-World War II Home Front National Historical Park	January 31, 2001 (#01000287)	Shipyards of Richmond; 37°54′53″N 122°20′48″W	Richmond	
43	Shadelands Ranch House	Shadelands Ranch House	August 29, 1985 (#85001915)	2660 Ygnacio Valley Rd. 37°55′33″N 122°01′13″W	Walnut Creek	
44	Shannon-Williamson Ranch	Shannon-Williamson Ranch	January 29, 1987 (#87000003)	RR 1/Lone Tree Way; 37°57′41″N 121°45′45″W	Antioch	Geocode coords are the current location of the ranch house.
45	SS Red Oak Victory (victory ship)	SS Red Oak Victory (victory ship)	January 30, 2001 (#00001674)	1500 Dornan Dr, Terminal One, Port of Richmond; 37°54′17″N 122°21′52″W	Richmond	
46	Tao House	Tao House	May 6, 1971 (#71000137)	1.5 miles (2.4 km) west of Danville; 37°49′28″N 122°01′47″W	Danville	Residence of Eugene O'Neill
47	Tassajara One Room School	Tassajara One Room School	April 11, 2014 (#14000135)	1650 Finley Rd. 37°48′12″N 121°51′36″W	Danville	
48	Tucker House	Tucker House	December 17, 1999 (#99001563)	110 Escobar St. 38°00′55″N 122°08′28″W	Martinez	
49	Winehaven	Winehaven	October 2, 1978 (#78000658)	Both sides of Stenmark Dr. between Drowly Dr. and Grays Cir. 37°57′05″N 122°25′03″W	Richmond	Boundary decrease approved November 16, 2021.

== See also ==
- List of National Historic Landmarks in California
- National Register of Historic Places listings in California
- California Historical Landmarks in Contra Costa County, California
