= Bank of Pinole =

- U.S. National Register of Historic Places
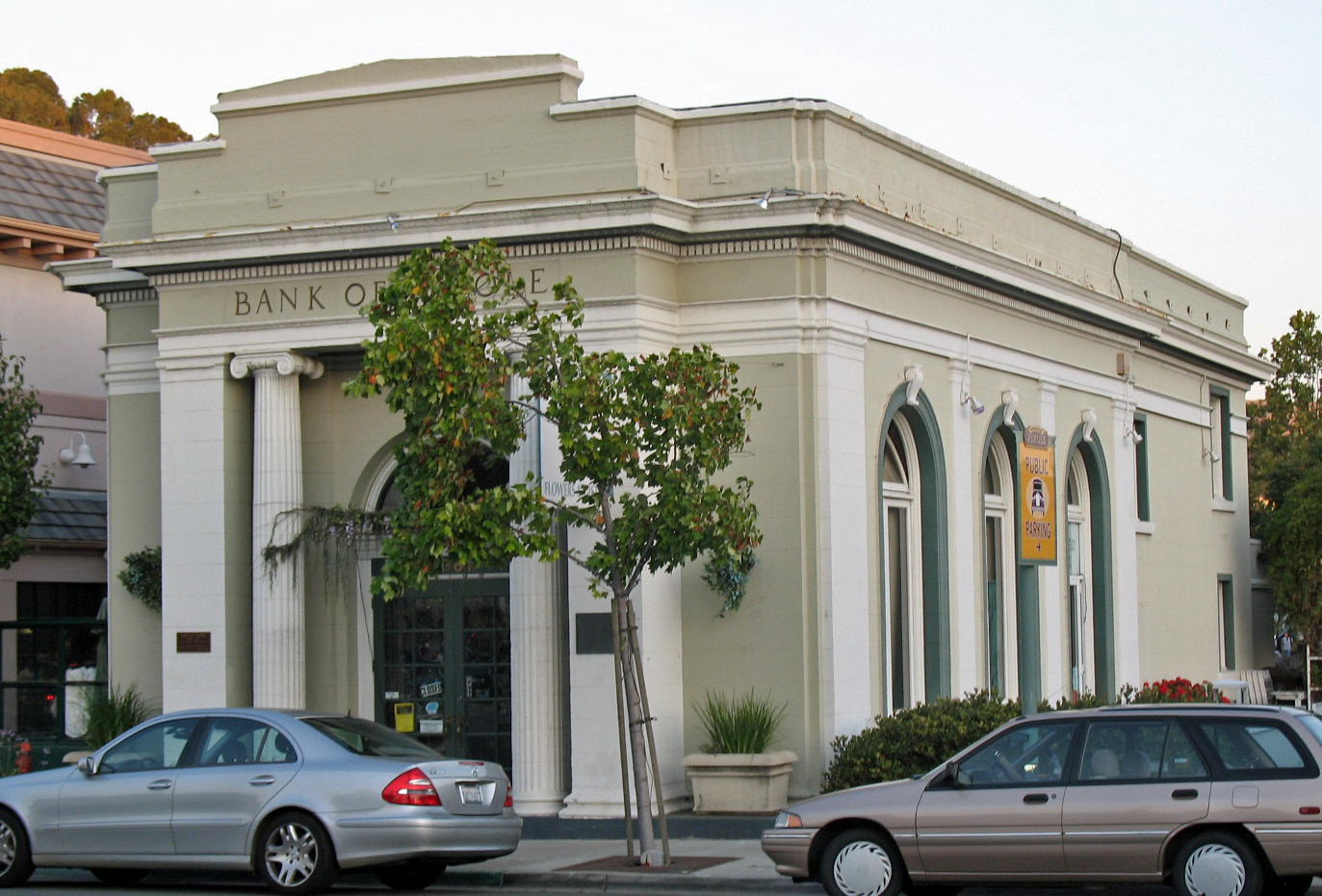

- Location within California Location within the United States
- Nearest city: Pinole, California
- Coordinates: 38°0′20.44″N 122°17′25.33″W
- Area: less than one acre
- Architectural style: Classical Revival
- NRHP reference No.: 96001175
- Added to NRHP: October 24, 1996

The Bank of Pinole is located at 2361 San Pablo Ave. in Pinole, California. Located in Old Town Pinole The Bank of Pinole was built in 1915 by E.M. Downer, Sr. and remained as a bank till the 1960s. It is currently owned by the City of Pinole and is occupied by the PSB Cafe And Venue.

It is a one-story building.

== See also ==
- National Register of Historic Places listings in Contra Costa County, California
