= John Muir National Historic Site =

National Historic Site of the United States

- U.S. National Register of Historic Places
- U.S. National Historic Landmark
- U.S. National Historic Site
- California Historical Landmark
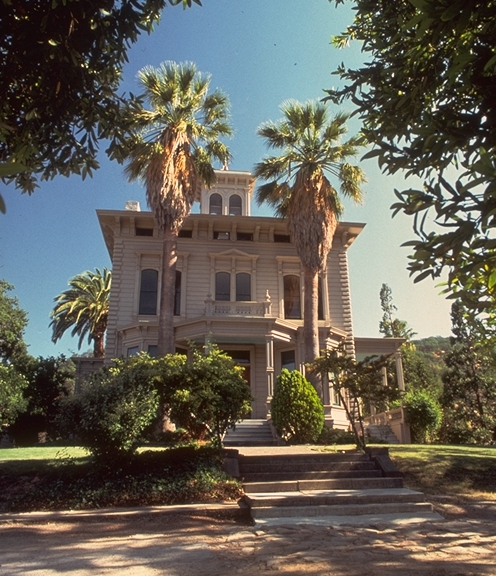

- Location within San Francisco Bay Area Location within California Location within the United States
- Location: 4202 Alhambra Avenue, Martinez, California
- Coordinates: 37°59′29″N 122°08′00″W
- Area: 345 acres (140 ha)
- Built: 1883
- Architects: Wolfe & Son; Martinez, Vicente
- Architectural style: Italianate-Victorian
- Visitation: 38,384 (2025)
- Website: John Muir National Historic Site
- NRHP reference No.: 66000083
- CHISL No.: 312

Significant dates
- Added to NRHP: October 15, 1966
- Designated NHL: December 29, 1962
- Designated NHS: August 31, 1964

The John Muir National Historic Site is located in the San Francisco Bay Area, in Martinez, Contra Costa County, California. It preserves the 14-room Italianate style mansion of Victorian era, where the naturalist and writer John Muir lived, as well as a nearby 325-acre (132 ha) tract of native oak woodlands and grasslands historically owned by the Muir family. The main site is on the edge of town, in the shadow of State Route 4, also known as the "John Muir Parkway."

== History ==
=== Mansion ===
The mansion was built in 1883 by Dr. John Strentzel, Muir's father-in-law, with whom Muir went into partnership, managing his 2,600-acre (1,100 ha) fruit ranch. Muir and his wife, Louisa, moved into the house in 1890, and he lived there until his death in 1914.

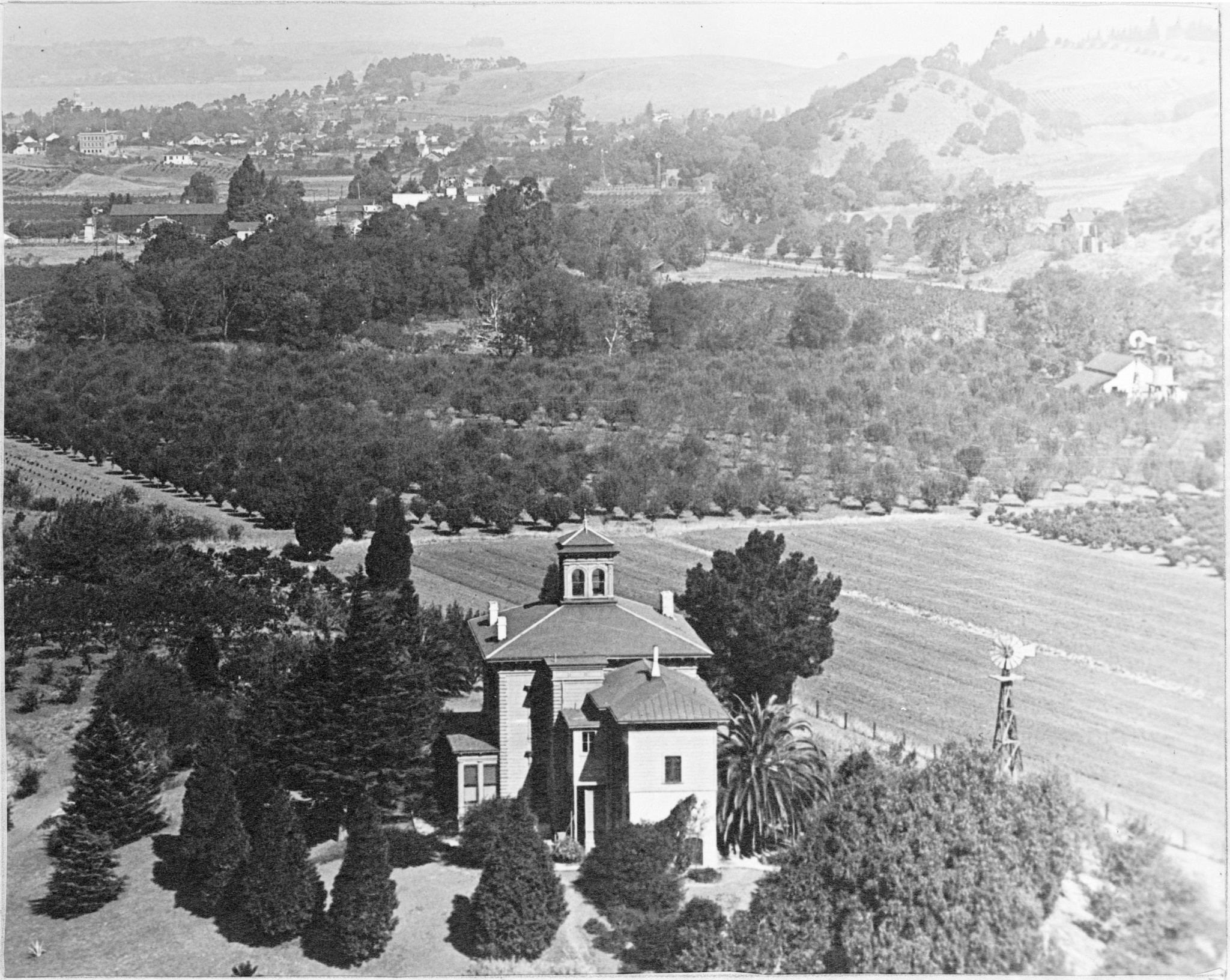
View from south over the house to the orchards in 1900

=== Alhambra Trestle ===
In 1897, for the sum of $10, Muir and Louisa ceded a right of way to the San Francisco and San Joaquin Valley Railroad. The document describes the land upon which the Alhambra Trestle is located. The railway was completed in 1900 and used by the Muirs to ship their fruit.

=== Preservationist ===
While living here, Muir realized many of his greatest accomplishments, co-founding and serving as the first president of the Sierra Club, in the wake of his battle to prevent Yosemite National Park's Hetch Hetchy Valley from being dammed, playing a prominent role in the creation of several national parks, writing hundreds of newspaper and magazine articles and several books expounding on the virtues of conservation and the natural world, and laying the foundations for the creation of the National Park Service in 1916.

The home contains Muir's "scribble den," as he called his study, and his original desk, where he wrote about many of the ideas that are the bedrock of the modern conservation movement.

=== Archive and Landmark ===
The Muir house was documented by the Historic American Buildings Survey in 1960.

It became a National Historic Site in 1964, is California Historical Landmark #312 and a National Historic Landmark, and is on the National Register of Historic Places.

In 1988 nearby Mount Wanda Nature Preserve (named for one of John Muir's two daughters) was added to the Historic Site.

The John Muir National Historic Site offers a biographical film, tours of the house and nature walks on Mount Wanda.

The site includes the Vicente Martínez Adobe.

== See also ==
- National Register of Historic Places listings in Contra Costa County, California
- History of the Yosemite area
