= Pacheco, California =

Pacheco
- Census-designated place
- Location in Contra Costa County and the state of California

- Location in the United States
- Coordinates: 37°59′01″N 122°04′31″W
- Country: United States
- State: California
- County: Contra Costa

Government
  - State senator: Tim Grayson (D)
  - Assemblymember: Anamarie Avila Farias (D)
  - U. S. rep.: Mark DeSaulnier (D)

Area
  - Total: 0.751 sq mi (1.945 km^{2})
  - Land: 0.751 sq mi (1.945 km^{2})
  - Water: 0 sq mi (0 km^{2})
- Elevation: 75 ft (23 m)

Population (2020)
  - Total: 4,183
  - Density: 5,570/sq mi (2,151/km^{2})
- Time zone: UTC-8 (Pacific)
  - Summer (DST): UTC-7 (PDT)
- ZIP code: 94553
- Area code: 925
- FIPS code: 06-54764
- GNIS feature IDs: 1659330, 2409012

Pacheco is a census-designated place (CDP) in Contra Costa County, California, United States. The population was 4,183 at the 2020 census. It is bounded by Martinez to the north and west, Concord to the east, and Pleasant Hill to the south.

== History ==
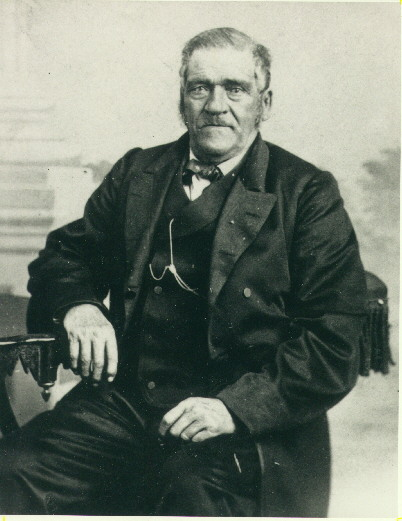
Pacheco is named after Salvio Pacheco, a Californio ranchero who owned Rancho Monte del Diablo.

The town was laid out in 1857 by Dr. J. H. Carothers and named for Salvio Pacheco, grantee of the Rancho Monte del Diablo Mexican land grant. A post office operated at Pacheco from 1859 to 1913 and from 1955 to the present.

Pacheco was briefly a prosperous commercial center. During this period, Pacheco Slough was deep enough to receive ocean-based shipping. From 1851 to nearly 1873, Pacheco was the county's commercial center: the shipping port for the grain grown in the Ygnacio, San Ramon and Tassajara valleys, with warehouses, a flour mill and shops along the creek. Walnut Creek, (then known as Pacheco Creek), then flowed deep and free into Suisun Bay. For over 20 years, Pacheco was a major shipping port for central Contra Costa County.

The destruction of Pacheco's Walnut Creek shipping channel occurred gradually over many years and for many reasons. Man-made ecologic damage eventually combined with a series of fires and floods, as well as an earthquake, destroyed the town and filled the Slough with silt during the 1860s, to ruin Pacheco's growing prosperity just as similar ones had done to the great classic ports of Ephesus and Troy. Pacheco was subsequently depopulated by the attraction of the nearby town of Todos Santos, later to be known as Concord.

== Annexation ==
In January 2011 the Martinez City Council voted to annex those portions of Pacheco north of California State Route 4. In September 2011, Martinez reached a tax sharing deal to pave the way forward for the annexation. In March 2012, sufficient protests were registered to force an election on the issue. In August 2012, the Martinez Police were mobilized to convince the voters to agree to the proposal.

As part of the annexation, Martinez would take over the management of the new Pacheco transit hub.

In August 2012 North Pacheco rejected annexation. Residents and property owners voted 40–39 against becoming part of Martinez. The 111-acre area remains unincorporated, governed by the County Board of Supervisors.

Opponents of the annexation called it a "bad deal for all" on a website created to oppose the proposal. The site claimed that annexing Pacheco would be too costly for Martinez – a city already suffering a deficit, and that property taxes would go up for residents and businesses. The Contra Costa Times reported that annexation of an area along Interstate 680 from Highway 4 north to the Burlington-Northern Santa Fe railroad crossing was approved by the Contra Costa County Local Area Formation Commission earlier that year. LAFCO's Executive Officer Lou Ann Texeira said that commissioners would have to take action to terminate the annexation at the September 12 meeting. City leaders say that the North Pacheco gateway area offers the potential for profit-making development. The Martinez city council scheduled another vote on the issue, possibly with a larger area.

== Geography ==
According to the United States Census Bureau, the CDP has a total area of 0.7 square miles (1.8 square kilometres), all land.

=== Climate ===
This region experiences warm (but not hot) and dry summers, with no average monthly temperatures above 71.6 °F. According to the Köppen Climate Classification system, Pacheco has a warm-summer Mediterranean climate, abbreviated "Csb" on climate maps.

== Demographics ==
Historical population
| Census | Pop. | Note | %± |
|---|---|---|---|
| 1990 | 3,325 | | — |
| 2000 | 3,562 | | 7.1% |
| 2010 | 3,685 | | 3.5% |
| 2020 | 4,183 | | 13.5% |
U.S. Decennial Census; 1850–1870 1880-1890; 1900 1910 1920; 1930 1940 1950; 1960 1970 1980; 1990 2000 2010

Pacheco first appeared as a census-designated place in the 1990 United States census.

=== Racial and ethnic composition ===
Pacheco CDP, California – Racial and ethnic composition Note: the US Census treats Hispanic/Latino as an ethnic category. This table excludes Latinos from the racial categories and assigns them to a separate category. Hispanics/Latinos may be of any race.
| Race / Ethnicity (NH = Non-Hispanic) | Pop 2000 | Pop 2010 | Pop 2020 | % 2000 | % 2010 | % 2020 |
|---|---|---|---|---|---|---|
| White alone (NH) | 2,705 | 2,480 | 1,996 | 75.94% | 67.30% | 47.72% |
| Black or African American alone (NH) | 75 | 71 | 74 | 2.11% | 1.93% | 1.77% |
| Native American or Alaska Native alone (NH) | 22 | 19 | 11 | 0.62% | 0.52% | 0.26% |
| Asian alone (NH) | 250 | 360 | 470 | 7.02% | 9.77% | 11.24% |
| Native Hawaiian or Pacific Islander alone (NH) | 8 | 8 | 15 | 0.22% | 0.22% | 0.36% |
| Other race alone (NH) | 3 | 0 | 23 | 0.08% | 0.00% | 0.55% |
| Mixed race or Multiracial (NH) | 78 | 128 | 265 | 2.19% | 3.47% | 6.34% |
| Hispanic or Latino (any race) | 421 | 619 | 1,329 | 11.82% | 16.80% | 31.77% |
| Total | 3,562 | 3,685 | 4,183 | 100.00% | 100.00% | 100.00% |

=== 2020 census ===
As of the 2020 census, Pacheco had a population of 4,183. The population density was 5,569.9 inhabitants per square mile (2,150.6/km^{2}).

The age distribution was 20.0% under the age of 18, 7.9% aged 18 to 24, 25.7% aged 25 to 44, 29.2% aged 45 to 64, and 17.2% who were 65 years of age or older. The median age was 41.7 years. For every 100 females, there were 93.4 males, and for every 100 females age 18 and over there were 92.3 males age 18 and over.

The census reported that 100% of the population lived in households. 100.0% of residents lived in urban areas, while 0.0% lived in rural areas.

There were 1,630 households, out of which 28.7% included children under the age of 18. Of all households, 42.3% were married-couple households, 6.3% were cohabiting couple households, 30.4% had a female householder with no spouse or partner present, and 21.1% had a male householder with no spouse or partner present. 30.0% of households were one person, and 13.1% had someone living alone who was 65 years of age or older. The average household size was 2.57. There were 1,034 families (63.4% of all households).

There were 1,655 housing units at an average density of 2,203.7 units per square mile (850.9 units/km^{2}), of which 98.5% were occupied. Of the occupied units, 78.3% were owner-occupied and 21.7% were occupied by renters. The homeowner vacancy rate was 0.4% and the rental vacancy rate was 0.6%.

== Education ==
It is in the Mount Diablo Unified School District.

== Media ==
The town of Pacheco is served by the daily newspaper, Contra Costa Times published by Bay Area News Group-East Bay (part of the Media News Group, Denver, Colorado). The paper was originally run and owned by the Lesher family.

== See also ==
- List of census-designated places in California
