= Salvio Pacheco =

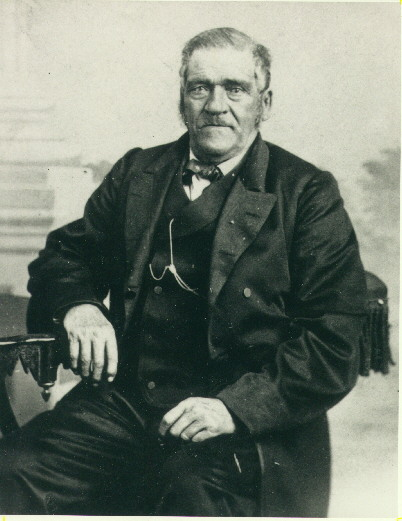

Alcalde of San José
- In office 1828
- Preceded by: Mariano Castro
- Succeeded by: Florentino Archuleta
- In office 1833
- Preceded by: Ignacio Ceballos
- Succeeded by: Pedro Chaboya
- In office 1843
- Preceded by: Antonio Buelna
- Succeeded by: Antonio María Pico

Personal details
- Born: 15 July 1793 Monterey, California
- Died: 8 August 1876 (aged 83) Martinez, California
- Profession: Ranchero, soldier, alcalde

Don Juan Salvio Pacheco II (1793–1876) was a Californio politician, ranchero and soldier. He founded the city of Concord, then known as Todos Santos. Pacheco also served three terms as Alcalde of San José (mayor of San Jose).

== Biography ==
Pacheco was born in 1793 in Monterey, to Ygnacio Bernardino Pacheco and María Carmen del Valle. He was named after his grandfather, Juan Salvio Pacheco I, who came to California as part of the Anza Expedition of 1776.

He enlisted at 17 years old, serving at the Presidio of Monterey and then the Presidio of San Francisco.

He married María Juana Flores in 1827. They had eight children together.

In 1834, Pacheco was granted Rancho Monte del Diablo, a vast estate in Contra Costa.

In 1869, Pacheco founded the town of Todos Santos (today known as Concord, California). He built the Salvio Pacheco Adobe there.

== Legacy ==
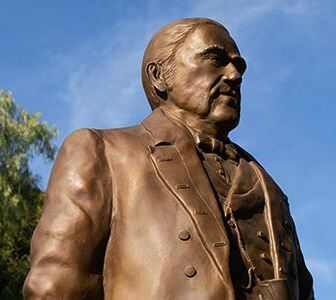
Statue of Pacheco at Plaza de Todos Santos, Concord.

The city of Concord was founded by Pacheco in 1869, originally named Todos Santos. There are numerous locations named after Pacheco and his life across Concord, including the Salvio Pacheco Adobe, Plaza de Salvio Pacheco, and Plaza de Todos Santos.

The town of Pacheco is named after him.

Pacheco's eldest son built the Fernando Pacheco Adobe in Concord.

In 2018, a statue of Pacheco was inaugurated in Concord's Plaza de Todos Santos.
