= Hollister Co. =

American lifestyle brand

- Hollister Co. store inside Southern Park Mall in Boardman, Ohio. (2020)
- Type: Division
- Industry: Retail
- Founded: July 27, 2000; 26 years ago (Note: Some merchandise also state that they were established in 1999.)
- Headquarters: New Albany, Ohio, U.S.
- Number of locations: 541
- Area served: Worldwide
- Key people: Fran Horowitz (CEO) of Abercrombie & Fitch)
- Products: Apparel; accessories; fragrances
- Parent: Abercrombie & Fitch
- Website: hollisterco.com

Hollister Co., often advertised as Hollister or HCo., is a retail brand owned by Abercrombie & Fitch Co, selling apparel, accessories, and fragrances. Goods are available in-store and through the company's online store. Hollister says it was founded in 1922 in Hollister, California; however, it was founded in 2000 in Ohio by Abercrombie.

== History ==
=== Establishment ===
The first Hollister store opened on July 27, 2000, at the Easton Town Center in Columbus, Ohio. Four additional test stores opened following in Overland Park, Kansas; Buford, Georgia; Canoga Park, California; and Paramus, New Jersey.

Although Hollister Co. was founded in 2000, Abercrombie & Fitch has created a fictional history surrounding its founder. According to this history, John Hollister, Sr. emigrated from New York City to the Dutch East Indies, and established the company bearing his name upon returning to the United States and settling in California in 1922. However, the company was actually founded in Columbus, Ohio, in 2000. A&F spokesperson Hampton Carney stated about Hollister, "We’re not going after the ‘core surfing market. It's more about the lifestyle and inspiration, rather than the actual activity."

=== International expansion ===
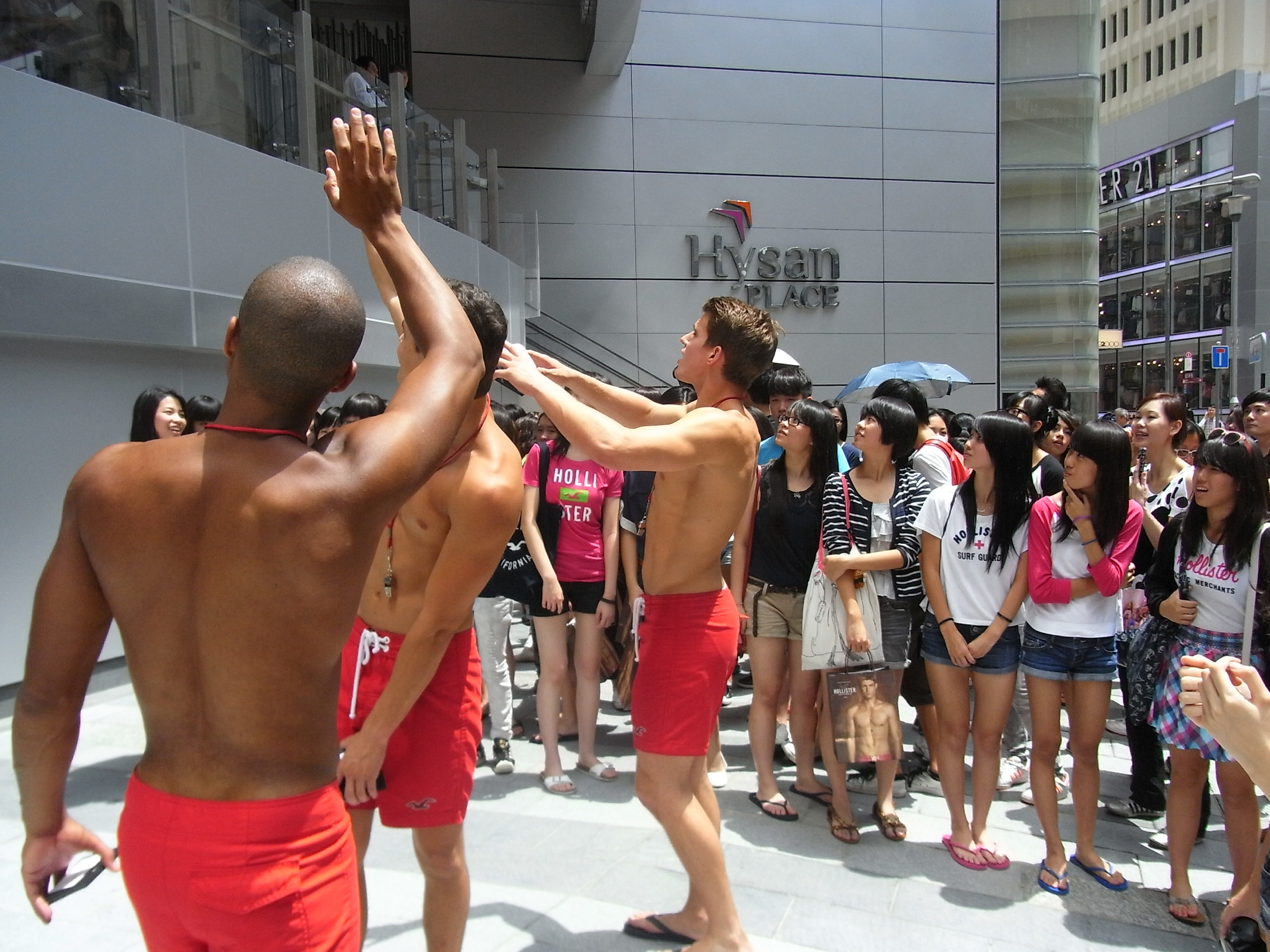
Hollister shop in Causeway Bay, Hong Kong

Abercrombie & Fitch Co. expanded into Canada in mid-January 2006 with the opening of Abercrombie & Fitch and Hollister Co. stores in Toronto, Ontario.

Starting summer 2007, Abercrombie & Fitch Co. spent an approximate amount of US$10 million to install video walls into Hollister Co. stores nationwide to play live-feeds from Surf City Huntington Beach, California. Hollister pays the city of Huntington Beach for the cameras located on the Huntington Beach Pier. By October 2, 2007, 100 select Hollister California stores began to promote Abercrombie & Fitch Co.'s fifth brand Gilly Hicks prior to the latter's debut in January 2008. Advertising was achieved through a variety of body care items including body sprays, deodorant, soaps, lotions, and lip balms called Sessions.

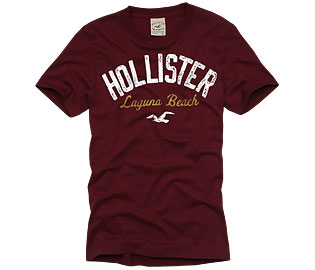
A Hollister tee shirt

On October 25, 2008, Hollister Co. opened its first store outside of the North America in Brent Cross, London. In December 2008, Hollister Co. opened its second store in the UK in Westfield London and a third at the upmarket Bluewater shopping centre, Kent, UK. After the success of the UK HCo. stores in London, the first Hollister store outside London was opened on May 14, 2009 in WestQuay Shopping centre in Southampton, its fifth UK store was opened in Milton Keynes at the beginning of 2010. Hollister Co. has also opened stores in Italy, Germany, China, Japan, and more recently in Spain. In 2011, Hollister opened its first store in Dublin, Ireland in the Dundrum Town Centre.

Marketing for the HCo. flagship launched in May 2009. The marketing campaign advertised the store as "The Epic Hollister Store." A&F launched a website that offered electronic postcards, downloadable wallpaper and screensaver as well as directions to the flagship and a promotional film with computer-generated graphics of the multi-level floor layout and design. A countdown timer called the "Epic Countdown" told the remaining time down to seconds until opening. The first flagship for the HCo. brand opened July 16, 2009.

== Stores ==
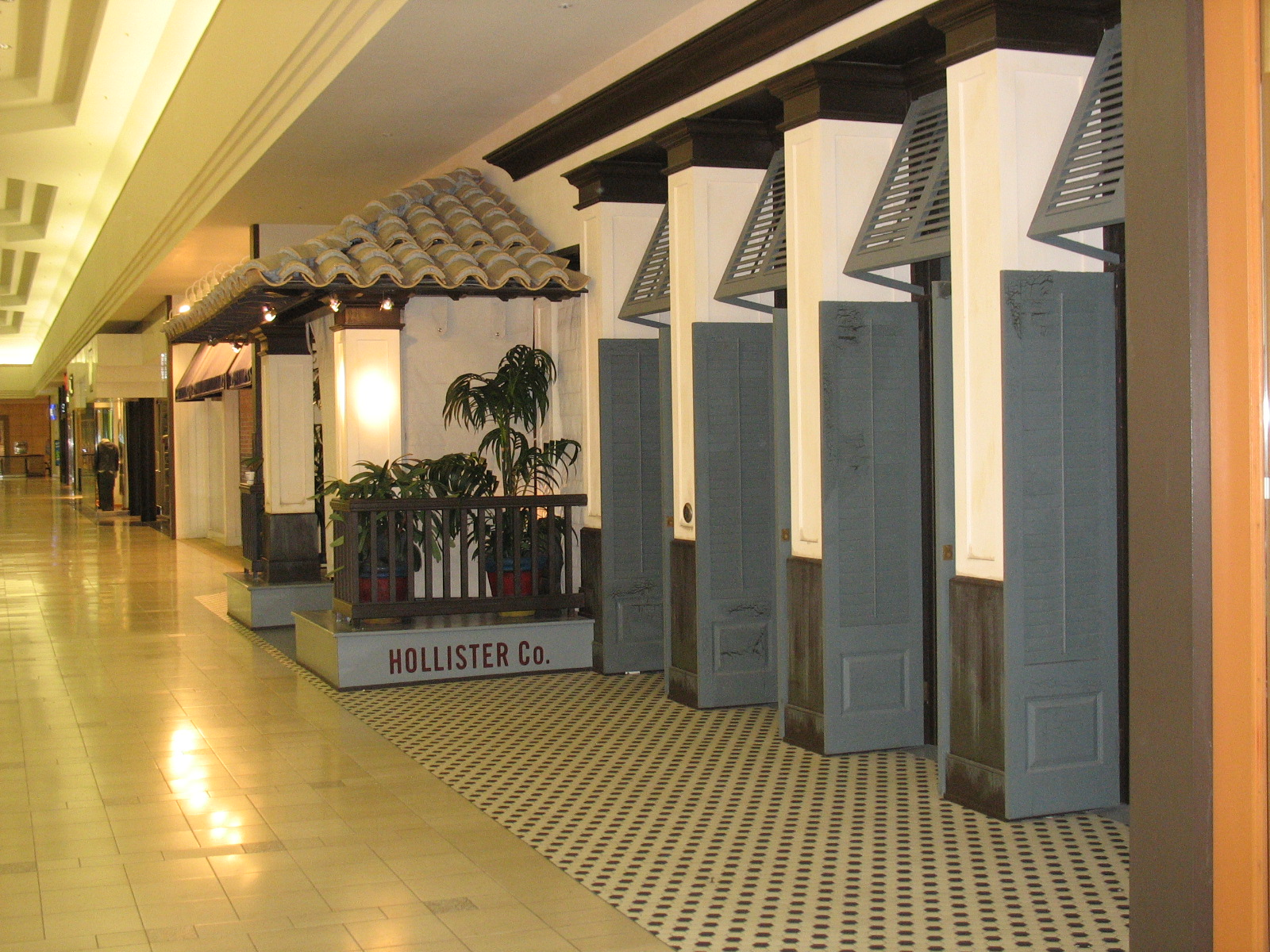
Side view of the Hollister storefront in the Sunvalley Mall, Concord, California, with the beach shack entrance

Abercrombie & Fitch originally designed Hollister Co. stores to simulate the appearance of vintage beach shacks in an indoor shopping mall. Exterior décor included shuttered windows and light and dark brown pattern walls. A teal boardwalk with three steps leads to the entrance. The interior of the store is mostly concealed from outside view by a wall. Abercrombie & Fitch experimented with shuttered windows when they created Hollister Co. and the concept was eventually expanded to the Abercrombie & Fitch brand.

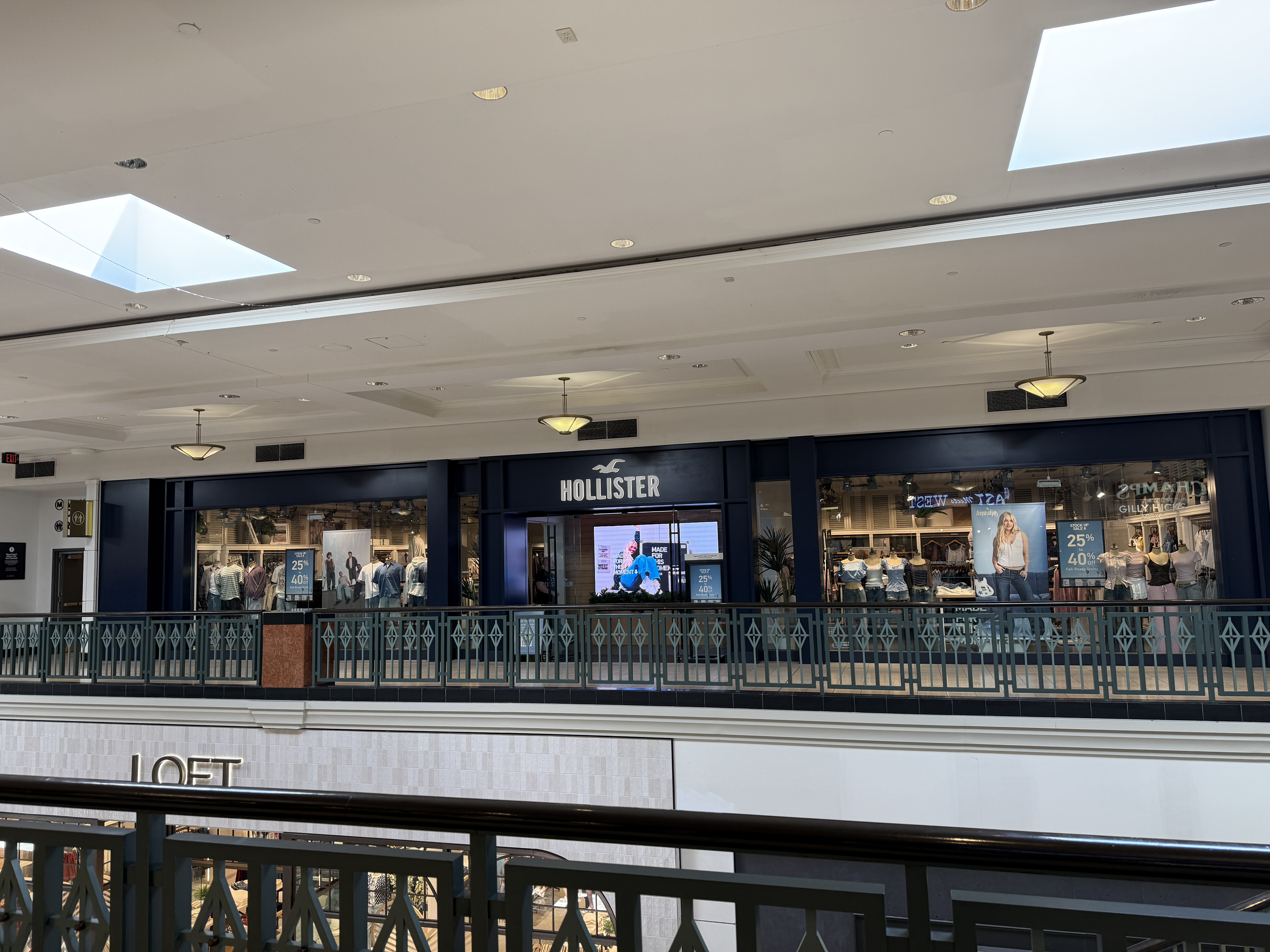
Hollister store at the King of Prussia Mall in King of Prussia, Pennsylvania with the modern storefont

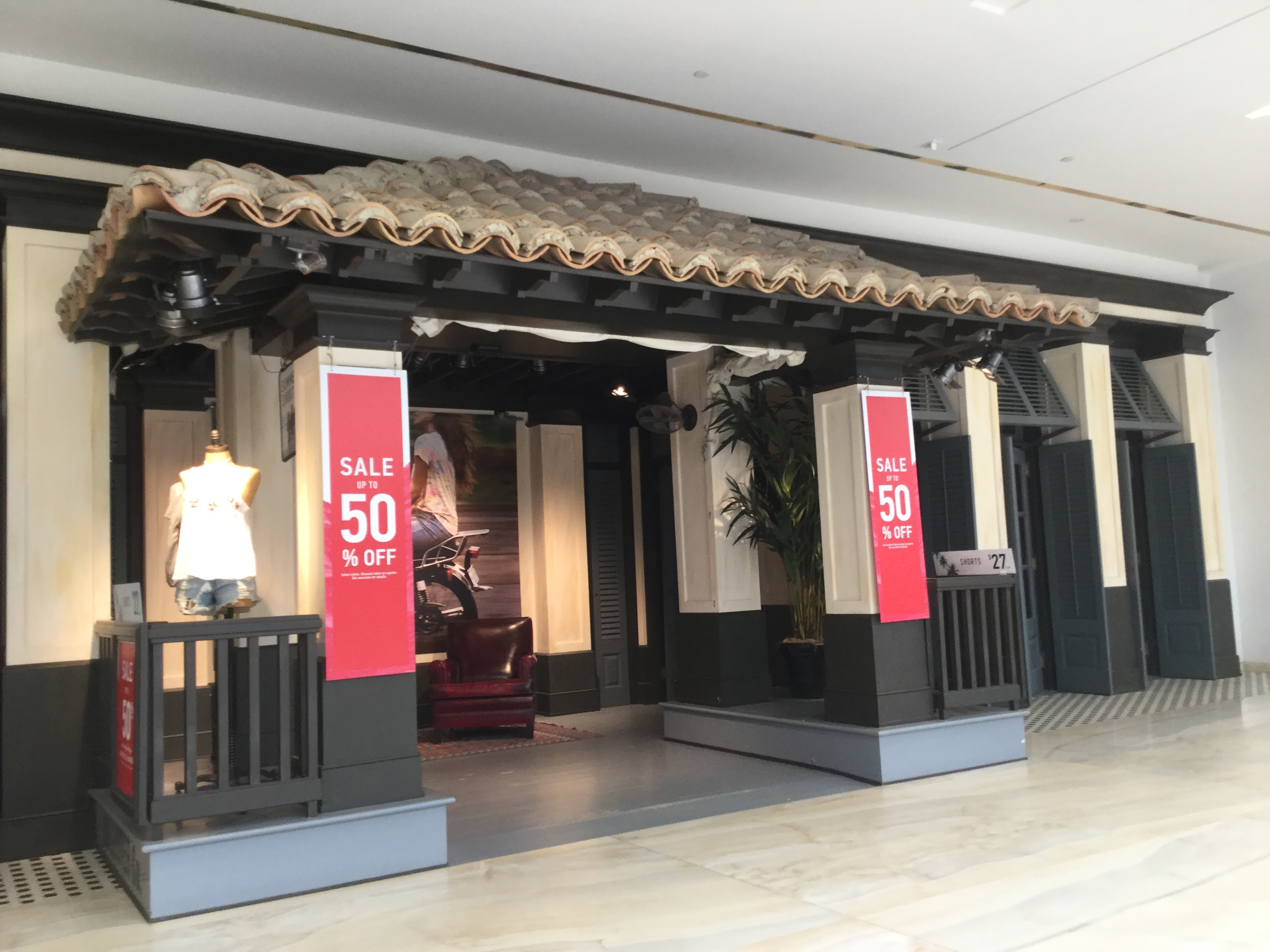
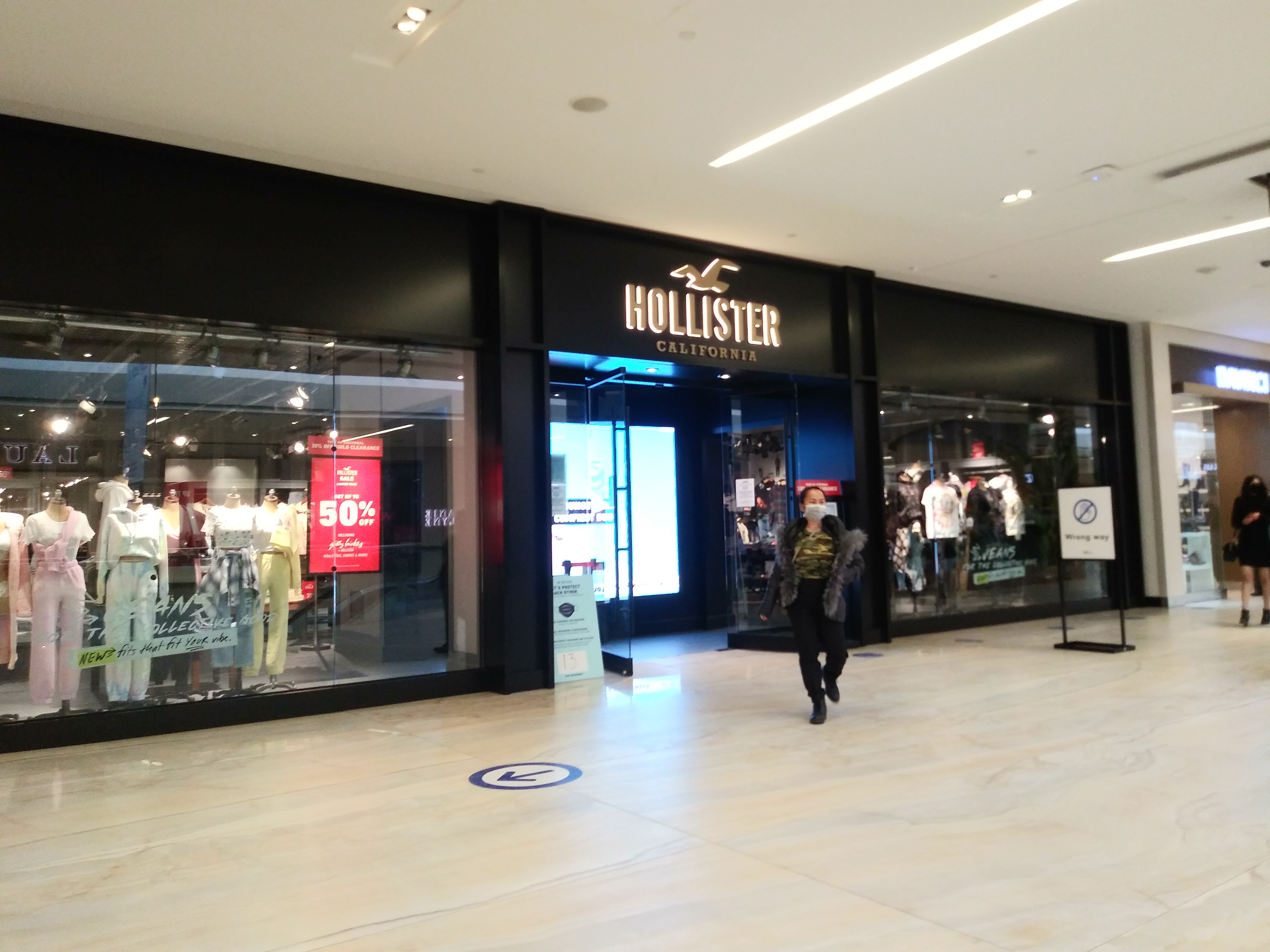
The Hollister Co. store at West Edmonton Mall in Edmonton, Alberta, showing the beach shack style storefront and the new current storefront. The interior of the store retains the beach shack style today.

In November 2016, Abercrombie & Fitch announced plans to redesign Hollister stores. The new design includes front windows and eliminates the California beach shack front porch entrance. The stores are smaller in square footage, but feature a larger merchandise area. as of January, some of the beach shack stores with stairs had been renovated and brand new constructed stores feature the redesign.

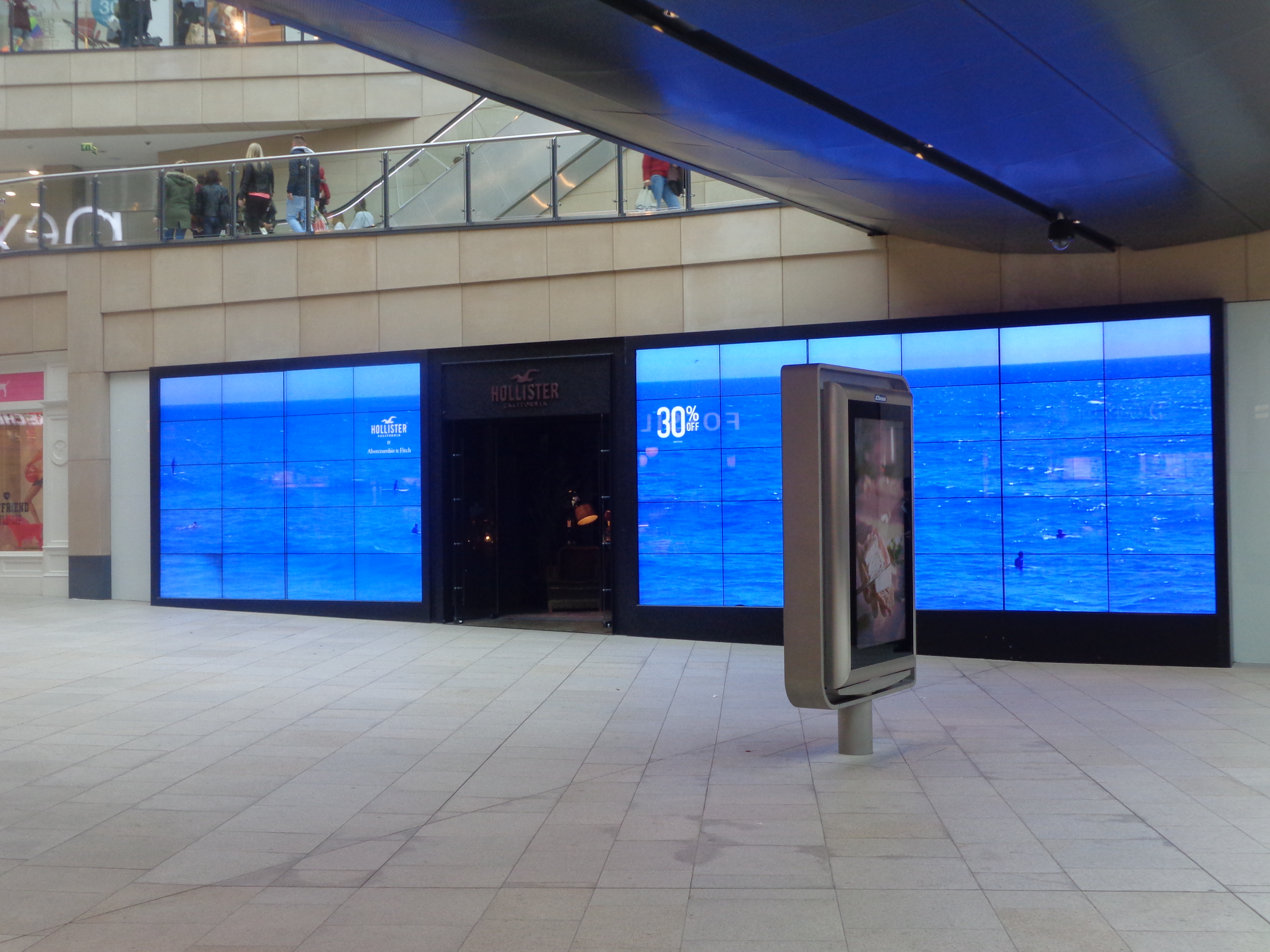
Front view of a Hollister store in Leeds. This is the new Hollister store design.

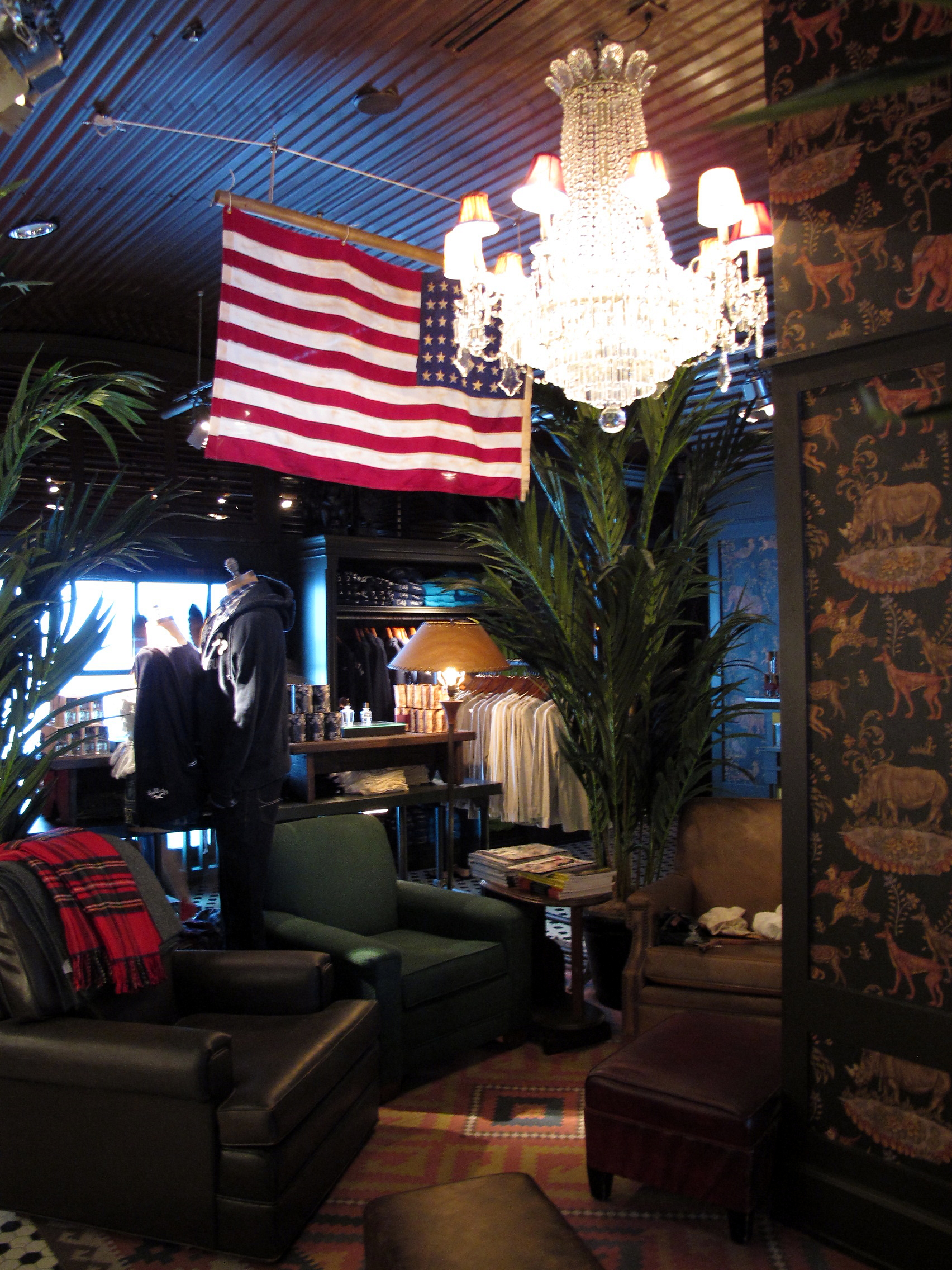
Following the drop in mainstream popularity, stores moved away from the dark environment and loud music, opting for a more customer-friendly experience by turning on the ceiling lights during opening hours and lowering the volume of the music.

=== Flagship store ===
The company opened the first flagship store for the Hollister concept July 16, 2009. The flagship was located in SoHo, New York, on Broadway. Four floors of the occupied building provide a retail space of 40,000 square feet (3,700 m^{2}). A company flagship representative commented, "The EPIC store is what Hollister is all about—big waves, surf, sun, and hanging out on the pier. The laidback HCo. vibe is effortlessly cool, and we're bringing the SoCal lifestyle to SoHo." Out of the total capital expenditures for fiscal 2008 of A&F Co. (up to 445 million USD), approximately US$300 million was spent on new store construction and remodeling, including the HCO flagship. The Hollister flagship store in SoHo closed in 2019 as part of a mass closure.

== Legal issues ==
=== Trademark conflict with Hollister, California ===
According to an article in the Los Angeles Times in April 2009, Abercrombie & Fitch has threatened merchants and residents of Hollister, California who want to use the name "Hollister" on clothing. The article quotes David Cupps, general counsel for Abercrombie & Fitch: "If they try, they would get a call and much more."

Also, according to the article: "The controversy over the name heated up in 2006 when Stacey Crummett, chief executive of Hollister-based Rag City Blues, added the word "Hollister" to the label of her vintage blue jeans. In response to her trademark registration application, Abercrombie & Fitch attorneys sent her a letter alleging she was violating the company's trademark and threatening to sue." Crummett subsequently withdrew the application.

=== Morris vs. Abercrombie & Fitch Co. ===
In 2007, the lawsuit Morris vs. Abercrombie & Fitch Co. was settled. Abercrombie & Fitch Co. admitted that they should have not asked their California customers for personal identification information during credit card refund transactions. Customers who were asked this information during June 9, 2005 through May 31, 2007 may be entitled to receive gift cards. Since the settlement, A&F Co. stores have stopped asking for this information for returns on purchases for which a credit card had been used.

=== Religious discrimination ===
Abercrombie & Fitch was charged for discrimination against an employee at a Hollister Co. store in California. The employee claimed they were criticized for wearing a hijab in store. The Muslim college student had been hired at an interview where she had worn a hijab as well. The interviewer told her she could only wear it in colors gray, navy, and white, but was told by a District Manager to remove it during a work day. The Council on American-Islamic Relations filed against Abercrombie & Fitch on February 23 with the federal Equal Employment Opportunity Commission. A&F had previously received a complaint in September 2009 over the same circumstance occurring in Oklahoma.

=== Wheelchair accessibility ===
In August 2011, Judge Wiley Daniel of the United States District Court for the District of Colorado ruled that two Hollister stores in the state were not in compliance with the Americans with Disabilities Act (ADA) due to the fact they have a porch-like entrance that contains steps while customers in wheelchairs have to access the stores through automatic side doors rather than the main entrance.

In 2012, the case expanded into a national class-action suit. In March 2013, Judge Daniel ruled in favor of the plaintiffs, finding that nationwide, 248 of 483 Hollister stores—all of which, the U.S. Department of Justice pointed out to the court, were built years after the ADA was enacted—have entrances in violation of the ADA. He ordered the company and disability rights activists to come to an agreement on the specific wording of an injunction requiring Hollister to either flatten its entrances, install wheelchair ramps, or make the raised entrances decorative and make all customers use the side entrances. As of May 2013, the two sides have not reached an agreement. In August 2013, Hollister Co., and its parent company Abercrombie & Fitch were ruled by a Colorado judge to require 248 stores with the "porch entrance", which includes stairs, to be redesigned to incorporate wheelchair accessibility or to remove the stairs altogether. Hollister will begin renovating the stores entrances to a more modern look, similar to the current Abercrombie & Fitch store layout by the end of 2013. The new entrance does not include steps.

=== Systematic searching of employees ===
At the district court of Kassel, Germany, Hollister and its German works council negotiated an accord to stop systematically searching all employees. The accord lets the employees roll a die, and who gets four is searched.

== Controversies ==
=== Fake Havassy surfboards ===
In 2005, Hollister Co. created 360 unauthorized knockoffs of signed Robb Havassy surfboards for use as decoration in their stores. After litigation, Havassy collected an undisclosed amount as damages from Hollister. In his book, Havassy writes of the incident "It's about how cool it is to be a surfer—and how a billion-dollar company put their hands on it. They got called on it."

=== Red Poppy ===
In November 2010, an assistant manager in the WestQuay, Southampton branch prevented an employee, Harriet Phipps, from wearing the Red Poppy, which is worn as part of the Armistice Day commemorations in the United Kingdom every November. The official Abercrombie & Fitch reason for the refusal was reported to be that the poppy is not considered part of the corporate approved uniform, and is therefore prohibited. The dispute attracted interest in the media, with Phipps appearing on ITV1's morning breakfast programme Daybreak, the Daily Mail and other newspapers, as well as on televised BBC News bulletins on 8 November 2010.

Archie Parson, secretary for the Southampton branch of the Royal British Legion, said: "I just hope the shop reconsiders its decision and a compromise can be made because it seems a bit insensitive not to back our troops putting their lives on the line."

After complaints, many upon Hollister's Facebook page, Hollister posted an update upon their page stating:

As an American company that has been around since 1892, we appreciate the sacrifices of the British and American servicemen/women in the World Wars and in military conflicts that continue today. Our company policy is to allow associates to wear a poppy as a token of this appreciation on Remembrance Day. Going forward, we will revisit this policy to the days/weeks leading up to Remembrance Day.

=== Racially insensitive photo ===
In August 2012, Hollister opened a store in South Korea and flew in several male models to promote it. One of the models took a photo of himself there with a "squinty-eyed" face, and another model gave the middle finger to cameras. After an investigation, the models were fired.

=== Breastfeeding ===
In January 2013, a woman who was breastfeeding at a Hollister store in Houston was told by a manager that she could not breastfeed and had to move. As a result, supporters organized a nationwide "nurse-in" at Hollister locations in which they would breastfeed at the stores.

A group of women who were breastfeeding at the Hollister at a mall in Wilmington, Delaware, were confronted by mall security and told to leave. This escalated into a controversy involving the mall's Facebook page.

=== Privacy concerns ===
TechCrunch reported that the Hollister mobile app in the iOS App Store was using session-replay functionality to record users' activities and send the data to Israeli firm Glassbox without the users' informed consent, compromising users' privacy and contravening the rules of the iOS App Store.

== Collaborations ==
=== Taco Bell ===
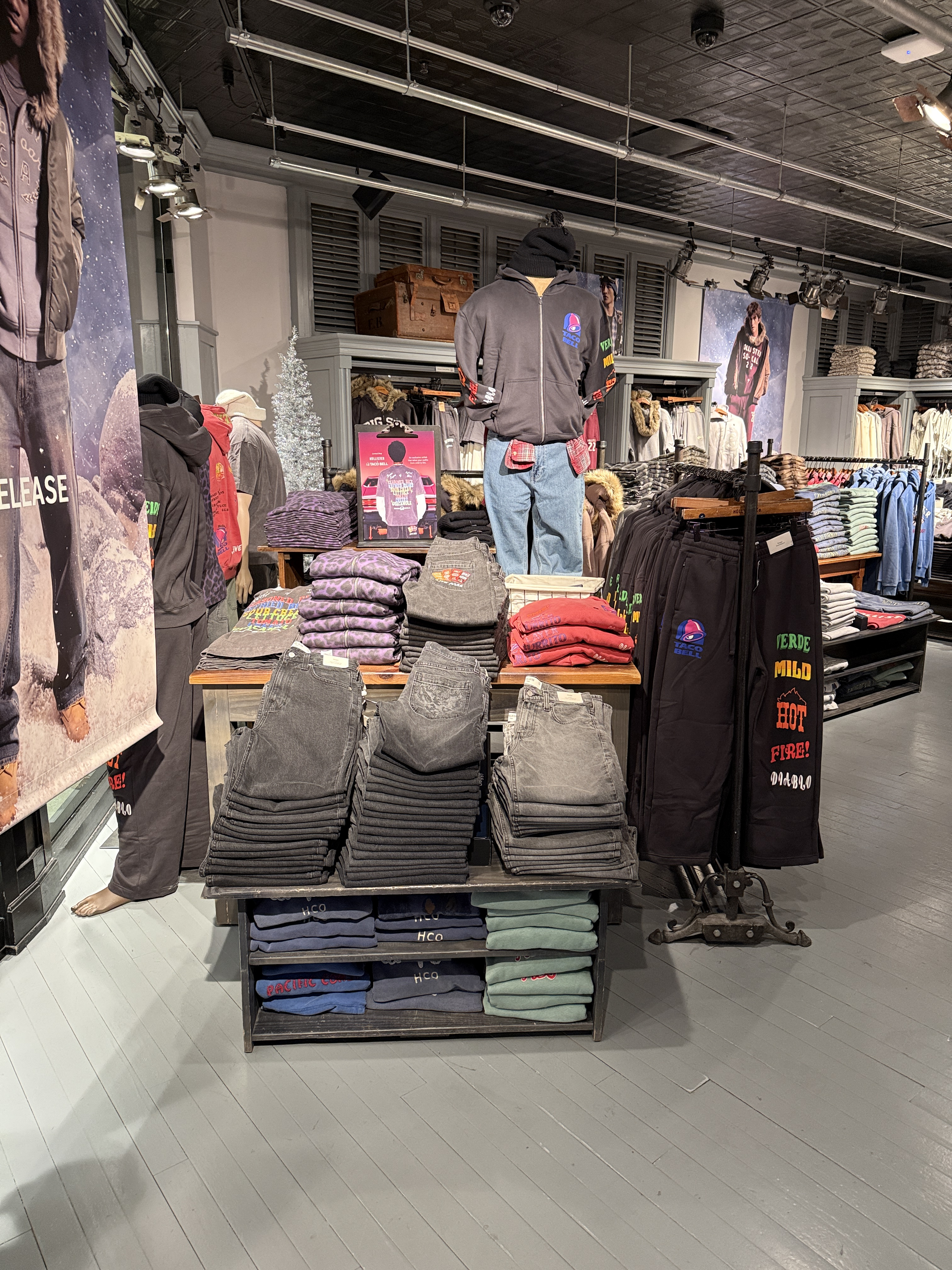
Hollister × Taco Bell clothing line displayed for sale at a store location in Orlando, Florida

In late 2025, Hollister Co. partnered with Taco Bell for a limited-edition, Y2K-inspired capsule collection. The drop, the first Hollister × Taco Bell collaboration, includes 11 pieces: vintage-style graphic tees, baggy denim, soft “Feel Good Fleece” hoodies and sweatpants, cozy socks, and a hot-sauce packet keychain accessory. The collection officially launched in Hollister stores and online on December 1, 2025, with prices ranging from US $14.95 to US $79.95, and sizes offered from XS to XL.
