= Viacom Entertainment Store =

Proposed chain of merchandise stores

Viacom Entertainment Store was a proposed chain of merchandise stores offering product based on Viacom owned properties, including Star Trek, Nickelodeon, MTV, VH1, Showtime, and other Paramount Pictures properties.

The first (and only) Viacom Entertainment Store opened at 600 Michigan Avenue in Chicago, Illinois, on May 23, 1997. The store's grand opening party was attended by celebrities tied to the company at the time, including Jon Bon Jovi and Jenny McCarthy. Flagship stores had been planned for large metropolitan areas around the United States, all in response to the success of the Disney Store, Warner Bros. Studio Store, and Discovery Channel Store concepts.

In addition, more than a dozen standalone Nickelodeon stores opened during 1997 and 1998:

- Scottsdale Fashion Square - Scottsdale, Arizona
- Sunvalley Shopping Center - Concord, California
- Fashion Valley - San Diego, California
- Hillsdale Shopping Center - San Mateo, California
- Westfield Fashion Square - Sherman Oaks, California
- The Oaks - Thousand Oaks, California
- The Falls - Miami, Florida
- Oakbrook Center - Oak Brook, Illinois
- Westfield Old Orchard - Skokie, Illinois
- Woodfield Mall - Schaumburg, Illinois
- Natick Mall - Natick, Massachusetts
- Mall of America - Bloomington, Minnesota
- Roosevelt Field - Garden City, New York
- Staten Island Mall - Staten Island, New York
- Palisades Center - West Nyack, New York
- Huebner Oaks Marketplace - San Antonio, Texas
- NorthPark Center - Dallas, Texas

The Chicago flagship failed to meet the company's expectations, and the company announced it would shutter it and the Nickelodeon stores in 1999. The store closed on January 17, 1999, while the Nickelodeon stores gradually closed throughout the year.
