= Tamil Ini =

- Title card
- Directed by: Mani Ram
- Written by: Mani Ram
- Starring: Thirumudi Thulasiraman; Vishwas Mani; Vidhya Subramanian; Mani Ram; Adi Govindarajan; Joya Nandy Kazi; Dhruva Nair
- Cinematography: Eswaran
- Edited by: Giri
- Music by: Balamurali Balu
- Production company: Avatars Productions
- Release date: December 15, 2012 (YouTube)
- Running time: 18 minutes, 33 seconds
- Country: United States
- Languages: Tamil; English

Tamil Ini ...? (transl. Tamil, hereafter ...?) is a 2012 Tamil-language short drama film directed and written by Mani Ram and starring himself, Thirumudi Thulasiraman, Vishwas Mani, Vidhya Subramanian, Adi Govindarajan, Joya Nandy Kazi and Dhruva Nair. The film is based on Dev, a second generation Tamil American, who slowly loses touch with his mother tongue Tamil over time. The film's title is based on the "Mella Tamil ini sagum..." (transl. Tamil will die slowly hereafter...) quote by Bharathiyar.

== Plot ==
The film begins with Krishnamoorthy praising many things about America including the temples (Shiva Murugan Temple), his son Saminathan's close-knit family, the Golden Gate Bridge, Disneyland, road, parks and above all his grandson Dev, whom he affectionately calls Deva. Krishnamoorthy and Dev run after each other in the park before Krishnamoorthy gets tired. Saminathan provides them with refreshments when a ball lands on Krishnamoorthy. He overhears them speaking a different language and Dev tells him that they are speaking Mandarin. Krishnamoorthy always wondered why Dev was unable to speak their mother tongue Tamil. He notices the lack of several Tamil traditions in Saminathan's household including his wife Lakshmi's decision to stop dancing Bharatanatyam and even Dev's name, which in Tamil should be Deva. Dev questions why his grandfather has a long name and mocks his name by calling him Krishnamoorthy blah blah. Krishnamoorthy explains that Kumaramangalam is his village's name and that Ramasamy is his father's name. Krishnamoorthy explains that he named his son Saminathan, but he is addressed here as Nathan. A disturbed Saminathan drinks all of water from the tumbler on the table. Saminathan activated the Tamil channel and Krishnamoorthy along with the rest of the family sit around the television to see what is playing. Much to Krishnamoorthy's despise, the television plays "Manmadha Raasa", "Nethu Rathiri" and some dramatic serial. Krishnamoorthy decides that Tamil culture can't be shown through television and decides to put Dev to bed. He discusses the issue of Dev's lack of Tamil fluency with Saminathan. A confused Saminathan tells his father that SPB and Sudha Ragunathan are coming, but Krishnamoorthy asks him will they come in the future if the current generation doesn't speak Tamil? Krishnamoorthy tells his son that the only way Tamil will live if it is spoken and otherwise, it will die. As Krishnamoorthy is about the leave, he gives Dev a watch in remembrance of him and Dev speaks his first words of Tamil: thatha, poithuvaanga thatha (transl. grandfather, go and come grandfather).

Fast forward to the future and Dev is a good tennis player and defeats his father in a match. He tells his father that he is in love with Neelima Ramachandran. His father discloses this information to his mother, who is content that the person he loves is a woman. Neelima tells Dev's parents that she is from Overland Park, Kansas and that her mother was the chief doctor at KU Med. Neelima tells Dev's mother that she wants black tea. Neelima is unsure of her father's whereabouts and thinks that he is from Tanjore, where Lakshmi is also from. Neelima goes on to say that her parents are divorced and that she isn't fluent in Tamil. Dev changes the topic to dinner and when Lakshmi lists out the dishes she made, Neelima asks what aviyal is. After dinner, they take a family photo.

The photo is displayed on a wall and moves after Nick Nathan, Dev and Neelima's son hit it with a ball. Nick tells his father that he has a project to do. His mom tries to help him with his project but when Nick tells her the project is about ancestry and when he asks her about her dad, Dev steps in and says he can do the project on his family. Nick practices presenting his project with his parents and talks about his great-grandfather, his grandparents and his parents. He asks his father what his ancestral language is and his dad after thinking for a bit responds that it is Tamil. The film ends with the quote "Mella Tamil ini sagum..." by Bharathiyar.

== Cast ==
- Thirumudi Thulasiraman as Krishnamoorthy Kumaramangalam Ramasamy
- Vishwas Mani as Child Dev Nathan
- Vidhya Subramanian as Lakshmi Nathan
- Mani Ram as Saminathan "Nathan" Nathan
- Adi Govindarajan as Dev Nathan
- Joya Nandy Kazi as Neelima Nathan (née Ramachandran)
- Dhruva Nair as Nick Nathan

== Production ==
=== Development ===
California-based Mani Ram based the film on his experience with his son, Vishwas, who stopped speaking Tamil after he was five years old and started going to school. His parents noticed a hesitation when he tried to speak Tamil thereafter and noticed that he could only understand. Mani Ram and his wife decided to only respond to him if he spoke in Tamil. After Vishwas successfully spoke to his parents in Tamil, Mani Ram cast him in the film as a means of thanking him.

=== Casting ===
The film's cast was almost entirely locally based and was composed of non-film actors except for Thirumudi Thulasiraman, who acted in Meipporul (2009) and Panithuli (2012). His character was based on Mani Ram himself. Mani Ram, who worked as a theater actor, himself starred in the short. Vidhya Subramanian, an Indian-based Bharatanatyam dancer, plays a dancer in the film as well.

== Soundtrack ==
The music was composed by Balamurali Balu and features vocals by Jaya Vidyasagar.

== Release and reception ==
The short film was released to positive reviews from both critics and audience. Reviewing the film during the fourth season of the Naalaiya Iyakkunar show on Kalaignar TV hosted by Nancy Jennifer, Prabhu Solomon noted the importance of self-repentance and Suresh Krissna appreciated the film's dedication and intensity towards its subject matter. As of 2013, the film has received 225,000 views on YouTube. The film was popular amongst the Tamil audience, especially the Tamil diaspora.

== Accolades ==
The film also shown as the ninth episode of the fourth season of the Naalaiya Iyakkunar show. The film was awarded the best film of the week, Mani Ram was awarded the best technician - director of the week, and Thirumudi Thulasiraman was awarded the best performer of the week during the show's fourth season.

In 2013, Mani Ram won the Norway Tamil Film Festival Award for Best Short Film Director.
