= KABN =

KABN may refer to:

- KABN (AM), a radio station (960 AM) licensed to serve Kenai, Alaska, United States
- KABN (California), a defunct radio station (1480 AM) formerly licensed to serve Concord, California, United States
- KABN-FM, a defunct radio station (88.9 FM) formerly licensed to serve Kasilof, Alaska, United States
