= Cheese zombie =

Type of baked food

A cheese zombie is the name of two different baked goods filled with melted cheese.

One type of cheese zombie was invented in Yakima County, Washington, by employees of the Grandview School District in the early 1960s. The employees were under the direction of Dorothy L. Finch, the lunch program supervisor. Finch and her employees invented the cheese zombie while trying to come up with ways to use surplus Velveeta cheese. The Yakima cheese zombie consists of a layer of cheese baked between two layers of bread dough and then sliced into squares, giving them the appearance of sandwiches. The cheese zombie was so named because one of the cooks said the first batch looked like a zombie.

A second type of cheese zombie was invented in Concord, California, in 1963 by Decla Phillips and Helen Ballock (Note: Helen Ballock's surname is spelled "Ballock" in some sources, and as "Beloc" in others.), bakers employed at Mount Diablo High School. The Concord cheese zombie was also created by layering cheese, in this case American cheese, between two layers of bread dough. A key difference between the Concord and Yakima cheese zombies is that the Concord version is cut into circles and crimped with a special tool before baking, which helps to contain the cheese within the bun. The pair were possibly inspired by Ballock's husband's recipe for Pirozhki.

In 2009, the term "cheese zombie" was registered as a trademark by Dumploads On Us, owned by Eric Giacobazzi. The trademark was granted June 5, 2012. In 2013, Patty's Original Cheese Zombies, Inc. was founded by Patty May, a former Mount Diablo Unified School District baker, and her son Robert May. They were notified by Giacobazzi that he owned the trademark. On April 2, 2014, Patty's Original Cheese Zombies, Inc. petitioned the United States Patent and Trademark Office to cancel the trademark, arguing that it was generic. The USPTO Trademark Trial and Appeal Board canceled the trademark, ruling that while it was not generic it was "merely descriptive".
