= Markham Nature Park and Arboretum =

Arboretum in California

Coordinates: 37.962°N 122.005°W

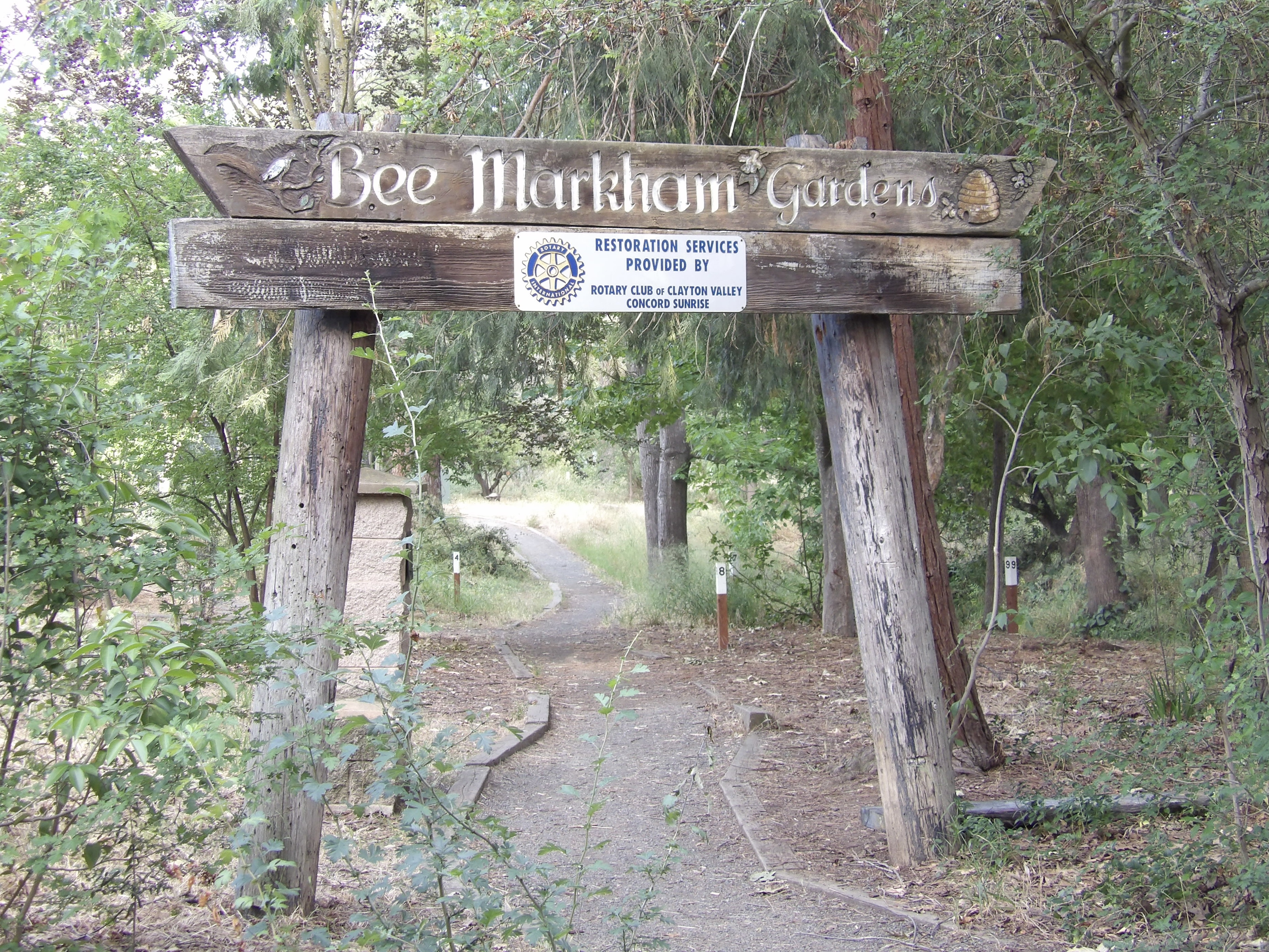
- Interactive map of Markham Nature Park and Arboretum
- Location: 1202 La Vista Ave, Concord, California
- Area: 16 acres (65,000 m^{2})
- Website: https://markhamarboretum.org/newmarkham/

The Markham Nature Park and Arboretum, also known as Concord Nature Area and Markham Nature Area, is a natural arboretum in Concord, California.

== History ==
The land that makes up the Markham Nature Park came from several sources. In 1963, the City of Concord purchased a residence and 2-3 acres of land along Cowell Road. In 1966, Ira and Bea "Bee" Markham sold their house and 12 acres of land to the city. This property included the Markhams' gardens, which ran along Galindo Creek and included over 1,400 trees they had planted. More land was purchased in 1980, bringing the total area to 16 acres.

The Markham Arboretum Society, later renamed the Markham Regional Arboretum Society, was formed to support the park in 1981.

== Gardens and features ==
The Markham Nature Park includes the International Garden, which showcases plants from around the world; a tree walk; native plants; the Bud Hansen Wisteria Arbor; and a community garden operated by the Markham Regional Arboretum Society.

== See also ==
- List of botanical gardens in the United States
