= Buchanan Field Airport =

Regional airport in Contra Costa County, California

Buchanan Field Airport Concord Army Air Base
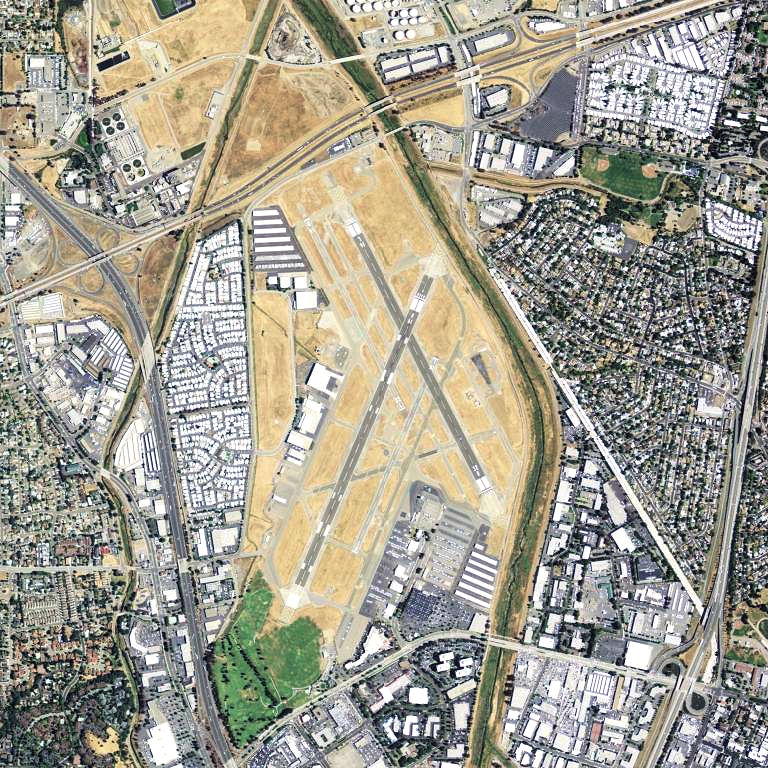
- USGS orthophoto, 2006
- IATA: CCR; ICAO: KCCR; FAA LID: CCR; WMO: 72495

Summary
- Airport type: Public
- Owner: Contra Costa County
- Serves: Contra Costa County, California
- Location: Concord; Pacheco
- Opened: 1947
- Elevation AMSL: 26 ft (7.9 m)
- Coordinates: 37°59′23″N 122°03′25″W

Maps
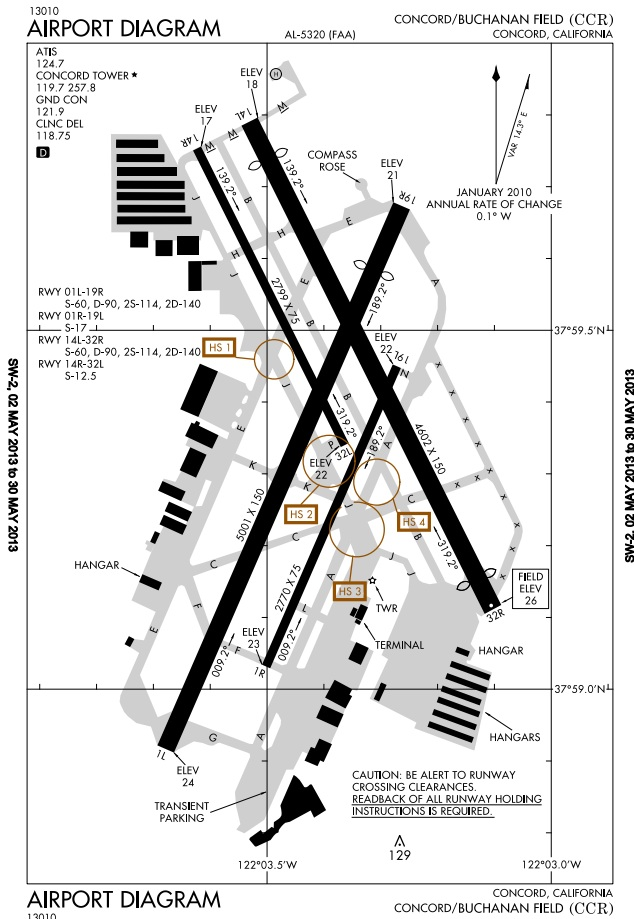
- FAA diagram

- Location within California Location within the United States

Runways
Direction	Length		Surface
Direction	ft	m	Surface
1L/19R	5,001	1,524	Asphalt; concrete
1R/19L	2,770	844	Asphalt
14L/32R	4,602	1,403	Asphalt; concrete
14R/32L	2,798	853	Asphalt

Statistics (2022)
- Aircraft operations (year ending 4/30/2022): 119,598
- Based aircraft: 340
- Source: Federal Aviation Administration

Buchanan Field Airport (IATA: CCR, ICAO: KCCR, FAA LID: CCR) is a medium-sized general and business public airport in Contra Costa County, California, United States, one mile west of the center of Concord and just east of Pacheco in the San Francisco Bay Area. The airport's street address is 181 John Glenn Drive Ste. 100, Concord.

The National Plan of Integrated Airport Systems for 2011–15 categorized it as a reliever airport, and it has an FAA certified airport traffic control tower.

== History ==
In 1942, Contra Costa County, California, purchased land for an airport in Central County for US$88,000. The airport was being developed by the county until the United States Army Air Forces Fourth Air Force expropriated the site. The Army added land and built airport facilities and a training base for pilots, Concord Army Air Base.

In 1946, the War Assets Administration (WAA) returned the airport to the county. In 1947, the transfer was formalized and the airport was named for County Supervisor William J. Buchanan, who served on the county Board of Supervisors for more than forty years. The airport continued to be used on occasion by the United States Army to transport troops, especially during the Korean War.

In 1972, George Lucas used Buchanan Field Airport for one of the last exterior scenes in the movie American Graffiti. In the scene, Steven Bolander (Ron Howard) says goodbye to friend Curt Henderson (Richard Dreyfuss) before Curt leaves for college on the Douglas DC-7C in the background.

In 1977, Buchanan Field reached its peak of activity with 357,000 total operations; by that criterion, Buchanan Field was the 16th busiest airport in the nation, ahead of San Francisco International Airport, John F. Kennedy International Airport, and LaGuardia Airport. During this time, noise became a concern, and in 1988 the county Board of Supervisors instituted a county noise restriction ordinance restricting certain aircraft from operating at Buchanan Field.

Beginning in the 1990s the county government updated the Buchanan Field Airport Master Plan. Commercial development of adjacent properties such as Sam's Club, Taco Bell, Sports Authority, and Jiffy Lube was allowed in 1992. The county has developed a new airport in Byron in the eastern part of the county.

On August 14, 2018, the county Board of Supervisors passed a resolution declaring the economic importance of these airports by recognizing that they are essential economic engines that aid Contra Costa County to meet the current and future transportation and economic needs of the community. The Board further directed staff to proactively pursue innovation and sustainable opportunities to enhance the economic development potential of the airports, as they are capital assets to the county and an integrated transportation asset to the Bay Area region.

== Airline and destinations ==
=== Current airline service ===
JSX started commercial airline service on April 19, 2016, with Embraer 135 aircraft.

Airlines	Destinations	Refs
JSX	Burbank; Seasonal: Las Vegas, Orange County	

=== Past airline service ===
Buchanan Field had commuter airline flights to San Francisco International Airport from 1969 to 1979 on Stol Air Commuter Britten-Norman BN-2 Islanders and Britten-Norman BN-2A Trislanders. In 1969 San Francisco and Oakland Helicopter Airlines (also known as SFO Helicopter) scheduled Sikorsky S-61s nonstop to Oakland International Airport continuing to SFO, up to five flights a day. SFO Helicopter had left the airport by 1975. In 1978 Stol Air had up to six flights a day to SFO; they ended in 1979.

Airline service returned to the airport in mid-1984: for less than a year, WestAir Commuter Airlines, successor to Stol Air, had eight weekday de Havilland Canada DHC-6 Twin Otters to SFO. WestAir, then independent, left Concord before becoming a United Express airline.

Jet service arrived when Pacific Southwest Airlines (PSA) began nonstop BAe 146-200s to Los Angeles International Airport (LAX) on May 1, 1986. In 1988, after being acquired by USAir, PSA had four weekday BAe 146s to LAX with one continuing to San Diego. In 1991 USAir replaced the BAe 146s to LAX with USAir Express Dash 8s, then Beechcraft 1900Cs; these ended around the end of 1991.

In 1991, American Eagle Airlines (Wings West Airlines) had four daily Fairchild Swearingen Metroliners to American Airlines' hub at San Jose. American later shut down its San Jose hub and American Eagle dropped Concord in 1992.

== Facilities ==
Buchanan Field covers 495 acres (200 hectares) at an elevation of 26 feet (7.9 meters). It has four asphalt and concrete runways: 1L/19R is 5,001 by 150 feet (1,524 by 46 meters), 1R/19L is 2,770 by 75 feet (844 m × 23 m), 14L/32R is 4,602 by 150 feet (1,403 m × 46 m), and 14R/32L is 2,798 by 75 feet (853 m × 23 m).

In the year ending April 30, 2022, the airport had 119,598 aircraft operations, an average of 327 per day: 95 percent general aviation, 5 percent air taxi, and less than 1 percent military and less than 1 percent commercial. 340 aircraft were then based at the airport: 284 single-engine, 30 multi-engine, 17 jet, and 9 helicopter.

== Accidents ==
On the evening of December 23, 1985, a Beechcraft Baron N1494G, executing a missed approach from an instrument approach (IAP) to runway 19R, lost control and crashed into the roof of the Macy's department store at the nearby Sunvalley Shopping Center, killing the pilot and two passengers and seriously injuring 84 people in the crowded mall, spraying them with burning aviation fuel. Four of the victims on the ground later died. The accident brought increased opposition to the airport and caused Pacific Southwest Airlines (PSA) to delay its flights that had been planned to start in January 1986.

Another plane crashed on April 13, 2004, shortly after leaving Buchanan Field. The plane landed on a minivan traveling down nearby Interstate 680 in Pleasant Hill and injured a 12-year-old girl. Officials determined the crash was the fault of an aircraft maintenance technician who had worked on the plane.

On December 21, 2006, at about 11:05 a.m., a 1989 Piper Malibu (PA46), registered as N1AM, crashed while flying the LDA (localizer type directional aid) approach into CCR. The aircraft was too low and hit obstructions on the ground. The plane hit the median of Highway 4, crashing between the highway and Marsh Drive just north of the runway. Three passengers were killed instantly, and another died after surgery.

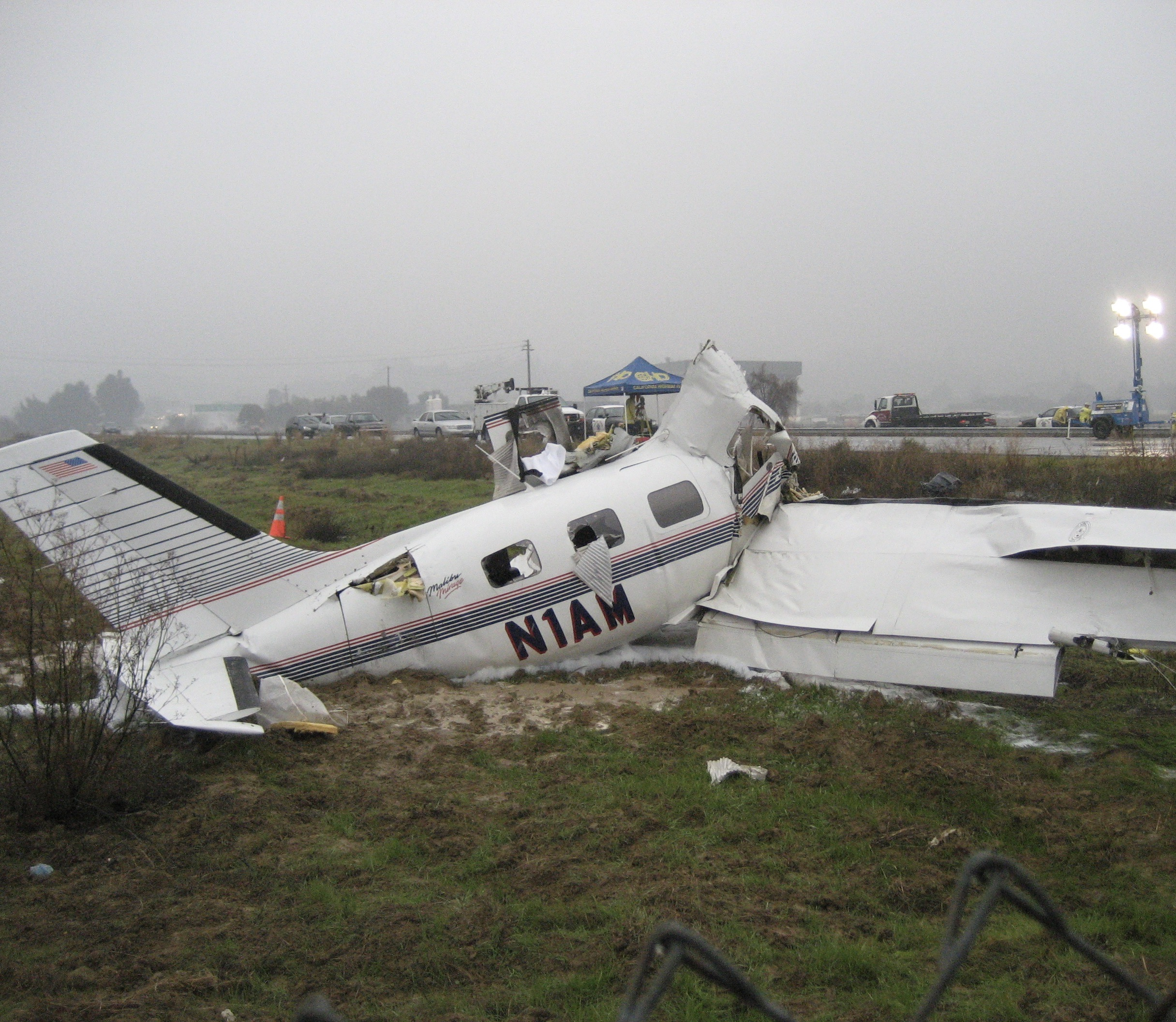
Piper accident at Buchanan Field that killed three adults and a child – December 21, 2006

On October 25, 2016, shortly after departing Buchanan Field, a Beechcraft Bonanza registered as N364RM crashed into a hill near Kirker Pass Road in Concord. The two occupants, both pilots, were killed in the crash. No one on the ground was injured. The investigation was unable to determine the cause of the accident, although issues with a recent avionics upgrade were suspected.

On January 30, 2024, a Van’s Aircraft RV-6, a single-engine plane, crashed at around 10:30 a.m. at the intersection of Concord Ave. and Diamond Boulevard, near the southern end of the airport. The pilot, who was the only occupant of the plane, was killed in the crash.

== See also ==
- California World War II Army Airfields
- List of airports in the San Francisco Bay area
