= Cowell, Concord, California =

Cowell
- Former unincorporated community District of Concord
- Location in California
- Coordinates: 37°57′10″N 121°59′22″W
- Country: United States
- State: California
- County: Contra Costa County
- City: Concord
- Elevation: 259 ft (79 m)

Cowell is a former unincorporated community now annexed to Concord in Contra Costa County, California. It lies at an elevation of 259 feet (79 m).

Cowell was named for Joshua Cowell, local landowner. A post office operated at Cowell from 1922 to 1969. Cowell was a company town for Cowell Portland Cement. Other than a former firehouse, nothing remains of the former town, which was replaced by the Walnut Country subdivision, more commonly known as "The Crossings," during the 1970s. A looming, dormant 244-foot high smokestack remained as the most prominent reminder of Cowell until it was demolished in 2009.
