= Matteo's Dream =

American all-abilities playground in Concord, California

- Location within California Location within the United States
- Location: Concord, California, Hillcrest Park
- Coordinates: 37°59′50″N 122°2′43″W
- Area: 16,000 square feet (1,486 m^{2})
- Created: 2007
- Designer: Leather & Associates
- Owner: City of Concord
- Status: Open all year
- Budget: US$700,000+donated labor
- Parking: Free
- Public transit: County Connection
- Website: Official website

Matteo's Dream is an all-abilities playground in an urban park in Concord, California. It opened on May 16, 2007. Matteo Henderson was a boy with serious disabilities including blindness, cerebral palsy, and cognitive development. He used a wheelchair for transportation. The playground was built with US$770,000 of donated materials and with the labor of 1600 volunteers. Matteo, and many other children of all abilities have enjoyed the playground. Persons with disabilities are able to drive their wheelchairs directly onto the structure. Features of the playground are specially engineered to accommodate people with various disabilities. Matteo died on March 16, 2011, at the age of 11. In January 2014, a Matteo's Dream themed Rose Parade float was featured in the 125th Rose Parade in Pasadena, California.

== See also ==
- Camp STAR
- Columbus Park
- Lake Alford Park
- Reverchon Park
- Sugar Sand Park
- Warriors' Path State Park
