= Shiva Murugan Temple =

Hindu temple in California

Religion
- Affiliation: Hinduism
- Deity: Shiva, Murugan

Location
- Location: 1803 2nd St, Concord, CA 94519
- State: California
- Country: United States
- Interactive map of Shiva Murugan Temple

Architecture
- Completed: 1957

Website
- www.temple.org

The Shiva Murugan Temple is a Hindu place of worship located in Concord, California. It was established in 1957 and is recognized as one of the earliest traditional Hindu temples established in North America. It is the first panchavarna (five-color) temple from the South Indian architectural tradition in the United States.

== History ==
The temple was founded as the Palaniswami Sivan Temple by Sivaya Subramuniyaswami in a San Francisco home.

In 1988, the temple relocated to its current site in Concord, California. The institution officially became known as the Shiva Murugan Temple in 1996. It was also incorporated as a non-profit organization.

== Architecture and design ==
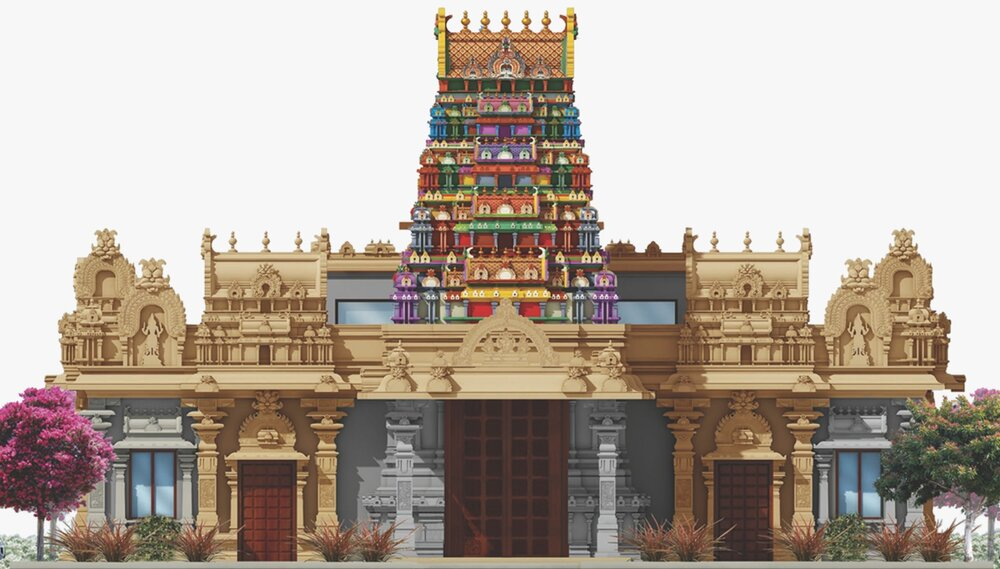
Rendition of temple redesign

The current temple is constructed in the classical Chola architectural style. It was designed by Kalaichemmal Dr.K.Dakshinamoorthy Sthapathi and architect Sharad Lal.

The external structure is in the traditional five colors, yellow, red, green, black, and white, also known as panchavarna. The Shiva Murugan temple is the first temple in North America in these colors. It includes a 48-foot gateway tower, gopuram, a flagpole, kodimaram, and a 47-foot main tower vimanam. The murtis, inner sanctums, and pillars inside the temple are hand-carved from solid granite.

It was opened in May 2025 with a consecration ceremony (Kumbhabhishekham). The ceremony included Vedic rituals, classical music and dance performances, and a community feast (annadanam).

== Community ==
The Shiva Murugan temple serves the Hindu community of the San Francisco Bay Area. Its activities include the Thaipusam walk, a 21-mile pilgrimage from San Ramon to the temple.
