= Glassbox =

Israeli analytics software company

Glassbox Ltd.
- Type: Private
- Industry: Software
- Founded: 2010; 16 years ago in Israel
- Founders: Yoav Schreiber, Yaron Gueta, Hanan Blumstein
- Headquarters: London, United Kingdom
- Website: www.glassbox.com

Glassbox is an Israeli software company that provides digital analytics and tools to monitor user interactions on websites and mobile applications. Its platform captures, analyzes, and replays user sessions, supporting over one trillion digital interactions annually.

== History ==
Glassbox was founded in 2010 by Yoav Schreiber, Yaron Gueta, and Hanan Blumstein in Israel. By October 2018, the company had raised US$32.5 million in funding, including investment from Updata Partners, which received two seats on the company's board.

In April 2020, Glassbox raised US$40 million in Series C funding to expand its analytics capabilities. Later that year, the company acquired UK-based analytics firm SessionCam to accelerate its expansion in Europe.

In June 2021, Glassbox went public on the Tel Aviv Stock Exchange, raising approximately $100 million at a valuation of $500 million.

In 2024, Glassbox was acquired by the private equity firm Alicorn, becoming privately held once again.

In 2025, Glassbox acquired Anodot, a leader in anomaly detection software, expanding its AI capabilities for proactive digital experience analytics.

== Products ==
Glassbox's cloud-based platform captures 100% of digital customer sessions across web and mobile channels, enabling real-time analysis of user behavior, friction points, and accessibility barriers.

In 2023, the company introduced GIA, an AI-powered assistant that integrates ChatGPT technology to allow users to search and summarize customer sessions using natural language.

In 2024, Glassbox launched Voice of the Silent, an AI capability that identifies behavioral patterns among users who did not leave feedback, helping brands uncover hidden sentiment and improve digital experiences.

In 2025, Glassbox released a unified accessibility analytics tool to help enterprises measure and improve WCAG compliance directly within the platform.
