= KABN (California) =

Radio station in Concord, California (1961–2004)

Concord, California; United States
- Broadcast area: Contra Costa County
- Frequency: 1480 kHz

Ownership
- Owner: Chester P. Coleman; (Concord Area Broadcasting Corp.)

History
- First air date: September 30, 1961
- Last air date: 2004
- Former call signs: KWUN (1961–1993); KKIS (1993–1996); KRHT (1996–2001); KCKC (2001–2002)

Technical information
- Facility ID: 13550
- Class: B
- Power: 500 watts day 5,000 watts night

KABN was a radio station at 1480 kHz in Concord, California, that operated between 1961 and 2004.

== History ==
KWUN received its construction permit in 1961 and began regular broadcasts on September 30, after a three-year fight to convince the Federal Communications Commission that there was room to place an additional radio station in Concord. The original owners of the station were the Service Broadcasting Company, helmed by Don Reeves. Before that date, however, the five-tower transmitter site in the Kirker Pass hills lost a tower when engineer Tony Russell, blinded by the afternoon sun, drove into a guy wire supporting one of the towers, sending it crashing onto his car and missing Russell by six inches.

KWUN, Inc., bought the station in 1963, followed by a sale to Kestner and Goldman Incorporated in 1967. The Kestner family bought out the Goldman family in 1968, and Adler Communications acquired it in 1971. Arthur C. Youngberg acquired the station in 1977, selling to Burgundy Broadcasting four years later. Through the various owners, KWUN maintained a music format with local programs for listeners in Contra Costa County.

KWUN was sold in 1986 to the Concord Area Broadcasting Corporation, controlled by Chester P. Coleman. The station changed its call letters in 1993 to KKIS, which had previously been the call letters of 990 AM (now KATD). It then became KRHT in 1996 and KCKC in 2001. One final change came in 2002 when Coleman switched the call letters of KCKC and the 840 station in Long Island, Alaska, then KABN. The constant changes in call letters were matched by technical uncertainties. In 1993, the station lost the land lease on its transmitter site, on which upscale homes were built; for its last 7 years, it operated with an interim 25-watt site broadcasting traffic and weather reports as Coleman sought to sell the license. It went silent in 2004, and the license was not renewed, expiring December 1, 2005.

The Federal Communications Commission cancelled the station's license on December 21, 2005.
