= Robb Havassy =

American painter

Robb Havassy (born December 2, 1969, in Southern California in the United States) is a painter known for his realistic depictions of women, landscapes, flowers, children and animals. When Havassy was 17, he moved to Newport Beach, California, to be closer to the ocean. He started surfing when he was about 17, although his first time on a surfboard was when he was eight in Waikiki, Hawaii, on a longboard.

== Early life ==
Before becoming an artist, from 1982 to 2002 Robb was an international fashion model for couturiers including Ralph Lauren, Calvin Klein, Christian Dior and Armani. He did not began his formal painting career until 1996, after he received a beginner's art kit as a 26th birthday present. Until then, his only artistic expression was through his photographs of his travels around the world, and his painted surfboards. He was discovered by a talent scout in Newport Beach when he was 17, but didn't decide to pursue modeling until a few years later, when he contacted the talent scout, took some photos and hired an agent.

== First piece ==
In 1996, Havassy received a beginner's art kit from two friends. His first traditional painting was a small surfing portrait of Duke Kahanamoku for photographer and friend Bruce Weber. Prior to this, he painted his surfboards, beginning in 1989.
