= Concord, California =

City in California, United States

- City
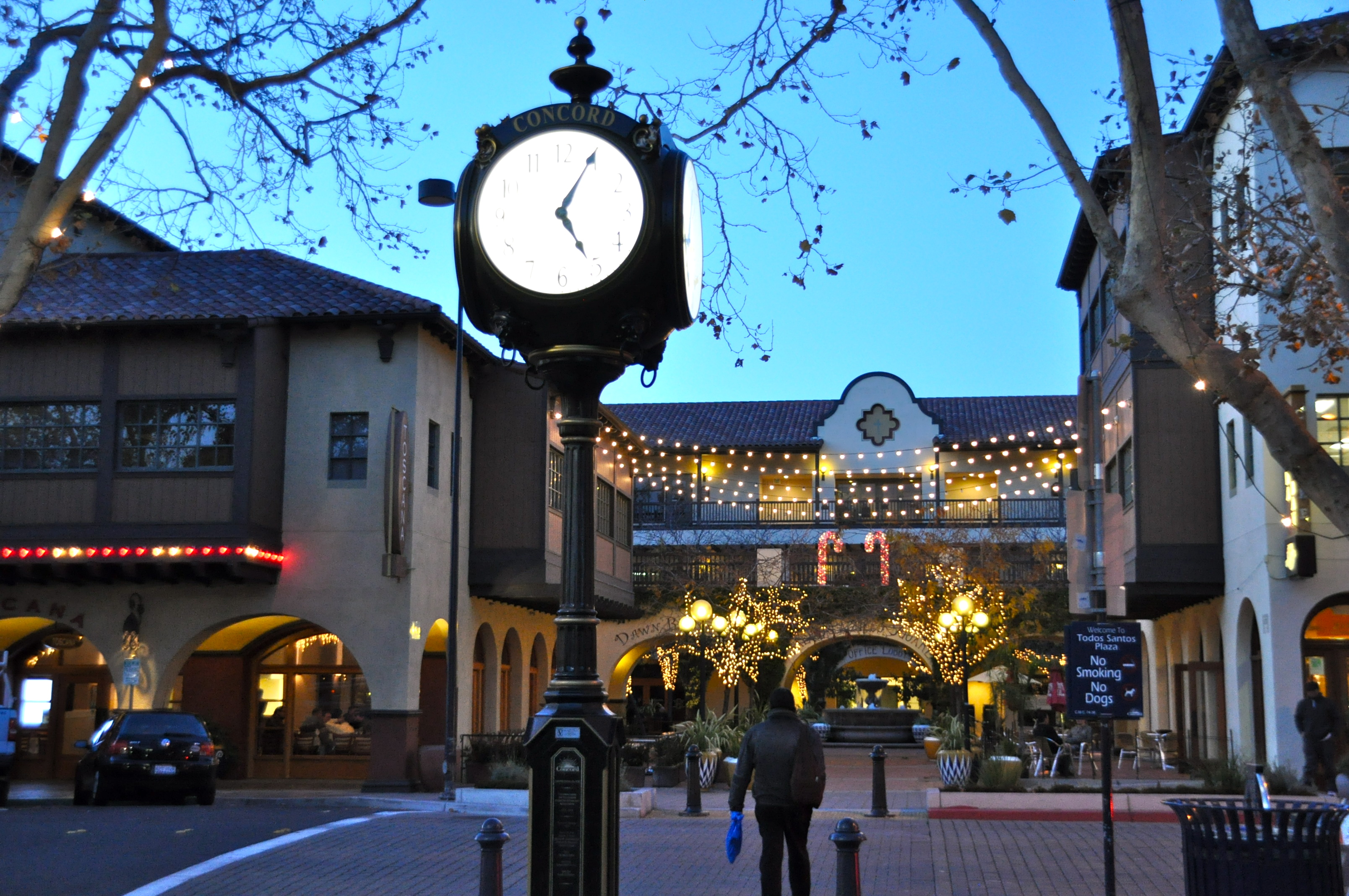
- Salvio Pacheco Square facing Todos Santos Plaza – downtown

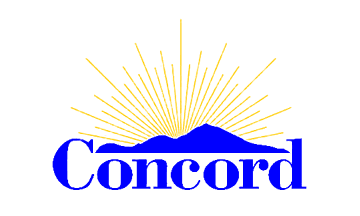
- Flag
- Interactive map of Concord, California
- Location within the United States Location within California
- Coordinates: 37°58′41″N 122°01′52″W
- Country: United States
- State: California
- County: Contra Costa
- Incorporated: February 8, 1905

Government
  - Type: City Council/City Manager
  - Mayor: Carlyn Obringer
  - State Senator: Tim Grayson (D)
  - State Assembly: Anamarie Avila Farias (D)
  - U.S. Congress: Mark DeSaulnier (D)

Area
  - City: 30.55 sq mi (79.13 km^{2})
  - Land: 30.55 sq mi (79.13 km^{2})
  - Water: 0 sq mi (0.00 km^{2}) 0%
- Elevation: 75 ft (23 m)

Population (2020)(US: 80th)
  - City: 125,410
  - Rank: 1st in Contra Costa County; 50th in California; 237th in the U.S.
  - Density: 4,104.7/sq mi (1,584.85/km^{2})
  - Urban: 538,583
  - Urban density: 3,064/sq mi (1,183.1/km^{2})
- Time zone: UTC−8 (Pacific)
  - Summer (DST): UTC−7 (PDT)
- ZIP Codes: 94518–94521
- Area code: 925
- FIPS code: 06-16000
- GNIS feature IDs: 1658308, 2410214
- Website: Official website

Concord is the most populous city in Contra Costa County, California, United States. According to an estimate completed by the United States Census Bureau, the city had a population of 123,261 in 2025, making it the tenth most populous city in the San Francisco Bay Area. Founded in 1869 as Todos Santos by Don Salvio Pacheco II, a noted Californio ranchero, the name was later changed to Concord. The city is a major regional suburban East Bay center within the San Francisco Bay Area, and is 29 miles (47 kilometers) east of San Francisco.

The United States Census Bureau defines an urban area in the East Bay which is separated from the San Francisco–Oakland urban area and with Concord as the principal city: the Concord–Walnut Creek, CA urban area had a population of 538,583 as of the 2020 census, making it the 80th largest in the United States.

== History ==
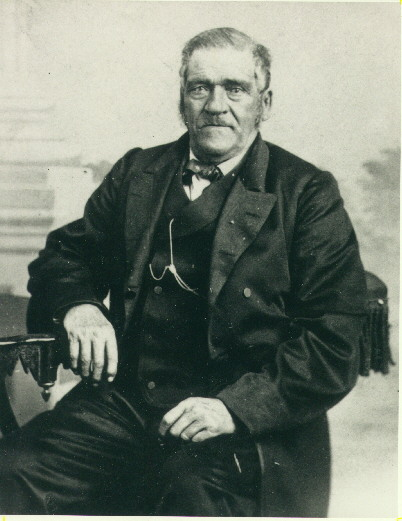
Concord was founded as "Todos Santos" in 1869 by Don Salvio Pacheco, Californio ranchero.

The valleys north of Mount Diablo were inhabited by the Miwok people, who hunted elk and fished in the numerous streams flowing from the mountain into the San Francisco Bay. Miwok and other indigenous people still live within city limits. In 1772, Spanish explorers began to cross the area but did not settle there. In 1834, the Mexican land grant Rancho Monte del Diablo at the base of Mount Diablo was granted to Salvio Pacheco (for whom the nearby town of Pacheco is named).

Concord was founded under the name of Todos Santos ("all saints"; a name still borne by the central city plaza and park between Willow Pass Road and Salvio Street), on the initiative of Pacheco in 1869. It achieved prominence in the 19th century, when most residents of Pacheco relocated to Concord to avoid the devastation of fire and flood which crippled Pacheco's formerly booming economy. Concord was incorporated on February 5, 1905.

The area around Concord in the surrounding Ygnacio and Clayton valleys was a large agricultural area. The crops grown included grapes, walnuts, almonds, wheat, hay, and even tomatoes. The area to the east (now the site of the Concord Naval Weapons Station) was the site of a few enormous wheat ranches of over 5,000 acres (20 km^{2}), and was almost a sea of wheat all the way to the marshes bordering Suisun Bay. During Prohibition, many vineyards were removed and replaced with walnut orchards. The town of Cowell, now incorporated into Concord, produced cement.

The first Concord post office opened in 1872.

=== Port Chicago disaster ===
The munitions on board a Navy cargo ship exploded while being loaded during World War II, resulting in the largest number of casualties among African Americans in any one incident during that war. On the evening of July 17, 1944, a massive explosion instantly killed 320 sailors, merchant seamen, and civilians working at the pier. The blast was felt 30 miles (48 km) away. A subsequent refusal by 258 black sailors to load any more ammunition was the beginning of the Navy's largest-ever mutiny trial, in which 50 men were found guilty. Future Supreme Court Justice Thurgood Marshall sat in on most of the proceedings and declared that he saw a prejudiced court.

== Geography ==
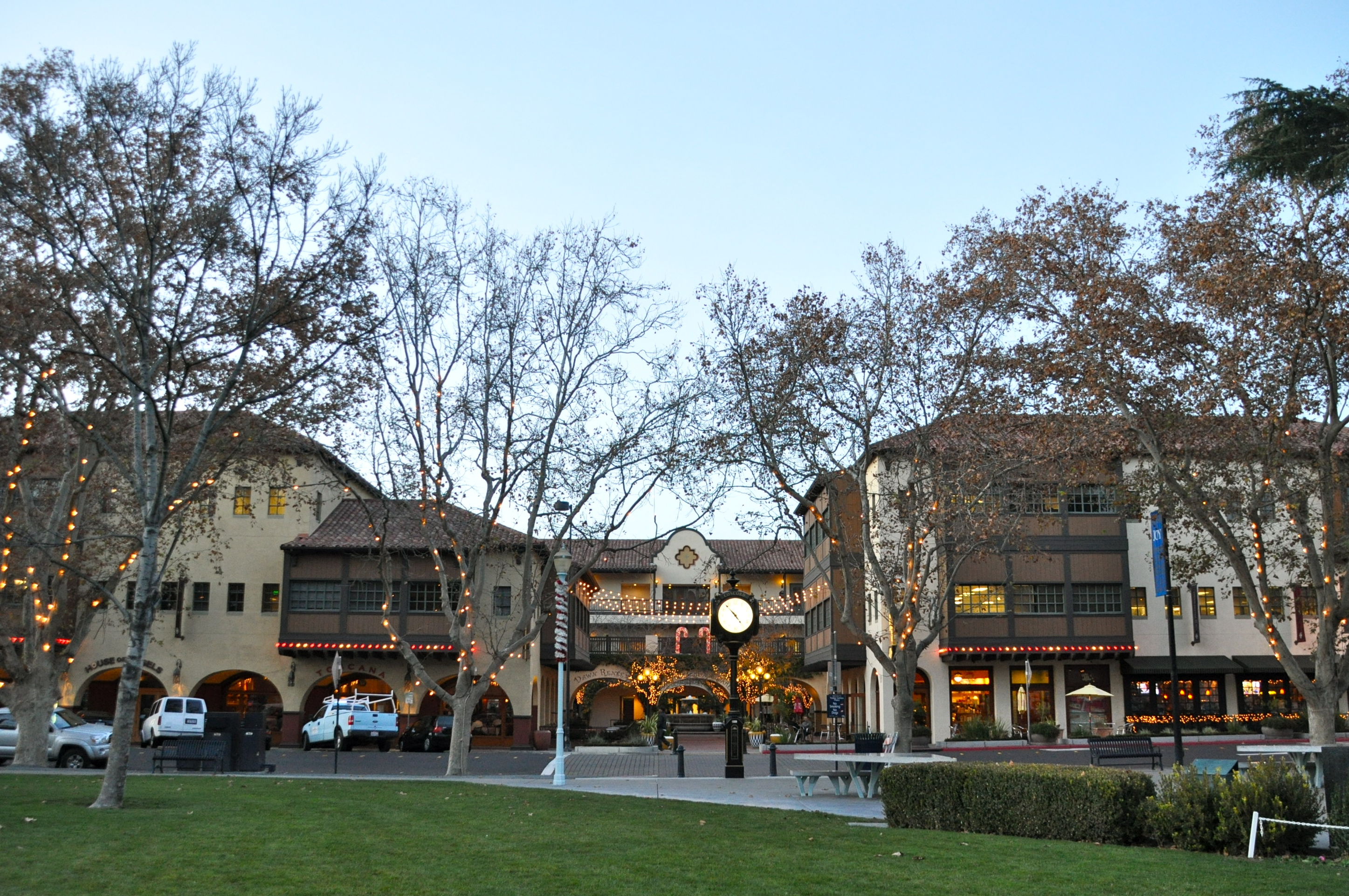
Todos Santos Plaza is downtown.

Concord is located at 37°58′41″N 122°01′52″W. It is 29 miles (47 km) northeast of San Francisco, 22 miles (35 km) northeast from Oakland, 65 miles (105 km) southwest of Sacramento, and 51 miles (82 km) north of San Jose.

According to the United States Census Bureau, the city has a total area of 30.5 square miles (79 km^{2}), all land.

The focal point of downtown Concord is Todos Santos Plaza, which encompasses an entire city block and is known for its farmers market, free summer concerts, and large number of surrounding restaurants. Much of the area immediately around downtown has recently been redeveloped, with new high-density apartment and condominium projects to take advantage of the proximity to public transportation and to the area surrounding the park. Despite this, some crime and homelessness remain issues in the downtown area.

Concord is bordered on the west by Pleasant Hill and the unincorporated community of Pacheco, on the south by Walnut Creek, on the southeast by Clayton, on the northeast by Pittsburg and the unincorporated community of Bay Point, and on the north by the unincorporated community of Clyde. Although it shares no border with Concord, Martinez (the county seat) is located almost immediately adjacent to Concord on the northwest. The North Concord BART station is also known as Martinez BART.

=== Climate ===
Concord, California

Climate chart (precipitation, max. and min. temperature)
J	F	M	A	M	J	J	A	S	O	N	D
108 12 4	97 15 5	82 18 7	26 22 8	12 25 10	3 29 12	0.5 31 13	2 30 13	6.1 28 12	24 24 10	66 17 6	71 12 4
- █ Average max. and min. temperatures in °C
- █ Precipitation totals in mm
Imperial conversion
J	F	M	A	M	J	J	A	S	O	N	D
4.3 54 39	3.8 59 41	3.2 64 45	1 72 46	0.5 77 50	0.1 84 54	0 88 55	0.1 86 55	0.2 82 54	0.9 75 50	2.6 63 43	2.8 54 39
- █ Average max. and min. temperatures in °F
- █ Precipitation totals in inches

Concord has a warm-summer Mediterranean climate (Köppen Csb), with warm, dry summers and cool, wet winters.

Official data from the National Weather Service cooperative station in Concord shows average January temperatures are a maximum of 57.2 °F (14.0 °C) and a minimum of 41.6 °F (5.3 °C). Average July temperatures are a maximum of 87.8 °F (31.0 °C) and a minimum of 58.2 °F (14.6 °C). There are an average of 45.0 days with highs of 90 °F (32.2 °C) or higher and 3.8 days with lows of 32 °F (0.0 °C) or lower. The highest recorded temperature was 113 °F (45.0 °C) on September 1, 2017. The lowest record temperature was 24 °F (−4.4 °C) on December 23, 1998.

Average annual precipitation is 23.91 in (607 mm), falling on an average of 71 days annually. The wettest year was 1995, with 46.62 inches (1,184 mm) and the driest year was 2007, with 10.57 inches (268.5 mm). The most rainfall in one month was 12.79 inches (324.9 mm) in December 2005, which included the 24-hour maximum rainfall of 3.95 inches (100 mm) on December 31.

Climate data for Concord, California
Month	Jan	Feb	Mar	Apr	May	Jun	Jul	Aug	Sep	Oct	Nov	Dec	Year
Record high °F (°C)	76.0 (24.4)	78.0 (25.6)	86.0 (30.0)	96.0 (35.6)	99.0 (37.2)	105.0 (40.6)	104.0 (40.0)	109.0 (42.8)	115.0 (46.1)	99.0 (37.2)	84.0 (28.9)	74.0 (23.3)	115.0 (46.1)
Mean daily maximum °F (°C)	56.2 (13.4)	60.8 (16.0)	65.1 (18.4)	69.5 (20.8)	75.5 (24.2)	82.1 (27.8)	86.6 (30.3)	86.8 (30.4)	84.2 (29.0)	76.2 (24.6)	64.7 (18.2)	56.7 (13.7)	72.0 (22.2)
Mean daily minimum °F (°C)	39.2 (4.0)	42.8 (6.0)	44.9 (7.2)	47.6 (8.7)	52.1 (11.2)	55.6 (13.1)	57.0 (13.9)	57.4 (14.1)	56.2 (13.4)	50.9 (10.5)	44.8 (7.1)	39.9 (4.4)	49.0 (9.5)
Record low °F (°C)	17 (−8)	21 (−6)	25 (−4)	30 (−1)	32 (0)	40 (4)	41 (5)	41 (5)	35 (2)	28 (−2)	23 (−5)	16 (−9)	16 (−9)
Average precipitation inches (mm)	3.63 (92)	3.59 (91)	2.43 (62)	1.27 (32)	0.68 (17)	0.18 (4.6)	0.00 (0.00)	0.03 (0.76)	0.03 (0.76)	0.77 (20)	1.88 (48)	3.49 (89)	17.98 (457.12)
Average precipitation days (≥ 0.01 in)	11	11	8	6	4	1	0	0	1	3	6	10	59
Source: Western Regional Climate Center (1991–present)

== Demographics ==
Historical population
Census	Pop.	Note	%±
1870	400		—
1880	399		−0.2%
1890	373		−6.5%
1900	586		57.1%
1910	703		20.0%
1920	912		29.7%
1930	1,125		23.4%
1940	1,373		22.0%
1950	6,953		406.4%
1960	36,208		420.8%
1970	85,164		135.2%
1980	103,251		21.2%
1990	111,348		7.8%
2000	121,780		9.4%
2010	122,067		0.2%
2020	125,410		2.7%
2025 (est.)	123,261	▼	−1.7%

=== Racial and ethnic composition ===
Concord city, California – Racial and ethnic composition Note: the US Census treats Hispanic/Latino as an ethnic category. This table excludes Latinos from the racial categories and assigns them to a separate category. Hispanics/Latinos may be of any race.
Race / Ethnicity (NH = Non-Hispanic)	Pop 2000	Pop 2010	Pop 2020	% 2000	% 2010	% 2020
White alone (NH)	74,119	61,416	54,104	60.86%	50.31%	43.14%
Black or African American alone (NH)	3,530	3,991	4,532	2.90%	3.27%	3.61%
Native American or Alaska Native alone (NH)	580	366	295	0.48%	0.30%	0.24%
Asian alone (NH)	11,264	13,219	18,435	9.25%	10.83%	14.70%
Native Hawaiian or Pacific Islander alone (NH)	551	744	644	0.45%	0.61%	0.51%
Other Race alone (NH)	319	325	884	0.26%	0.27%	0.70%
Mixed race or Multiracial (NH)	4,857	4,695	7,563	3.99%	3.85%	6.03%
Hispanic or Latino (any race)	26,560	37,311	38,953	21.81%	30.57%	31.06%
Total	121,780	122,067	125,410	100.00%	100.00%	100.00%

=== 2020 census ===
The 2020 United States census reported that Concord had a population of 125,410. The population density was 4,104.7 inhabitants per square mile (1,584.8/km^{2}). The racial makeup of Concord was 47.7% White, 3.8% African American, 1.1% Native American, 15.0% Asian, 0.6% Pacific Islander, 17.0% from other races, and 14.9% from two or more races. Hispanic or Latino of any race were 31.1% of the population.

The census reported that 98.9% of the population lived in households, 0.6% lived in non-institutionalized group quarters, and 0.5% were institutionalized.

There were 45,800 households, out of which 31.5% included children under the age of 18, 49.0% were married-couple households, 7.4% were cohabiting couple households, 26.1% had a female householder with no partner present, and 17.5% had a male householder with no partner present. 23.0% of households were one person, and 10.1% were one person aged 65 or older. The average household size was 2.71. There were 31,500 families (68.8% of all households).

The age distribution was 20.7% under the age of 18, 7.7% aged 18 to 24, 29.3% aged 25 to 44, 26.1% aged 45 to 64, and 16.3% who were 65 years of age or older. The median age was 39.5 years. For every 100 females, there were 97.6 males.

There were 47,597 housing units at an average density of 1,557.9 units per square mile (601.5 units/km^{2}), of which 45,800 (96.2%) were occupied. Of these, 59.1% were owner-occupied, and 40.9% were occupied by renters.

In 2023, the US Census Bureau estimated that the median household income was $109,195, and the per capita income was $49,514. About 6.0% of families and 8.9% of the population were below the poverty line.

=== 2010 census ===
The 2010 United States census reported that Concord had a population of 122,067. The population density was 3,996.2 inhabitants per square mile (1,542.9/km^{2}). The ethnic makeup of Concord was 78,767 (64.5%) White, 4,371 (3.6%) African American, 852 (0.7%) Native American, 13,538 (11.1%) Asian (4.4% Filipino, 2.4% Chinese, 1.3% Indian, 0.7% Vietnamese, 0.6% Japanese, 0.6% Korean), 816 (0.7%) Pacific Islander, 15,969 (13.1%) from other ethnicities, and 7,754 (6.4%) from two or more ethnicities. Hispanic or Latino of any ethnicity were 37,311 persons (30.6%).

The Census reported that 121,020 people (99.1% of the population) lived in households, 512 (0.4%) lived in non-institutionalized group quarters, and 535 (0.4%) were institutionalized.

There were 44,278 households, out of which 15,421 (34.8%) had children under the age of 18 living in them, 21,725 (49.1%) were opposite-sex married couples living together, 5,642 (12.7%) had a female householder with no husband present, 2,707 (6.1%) had a male householder with no wife present. There were 2,952 (6.7%) unmarried opposite-sex partnerships, and 512 (1.2%) same-sex married couples or partnerships. 10,406 households (23.5%) were made up of individuals, and 3,625 (8.2%) had someone living alone who was 65 years of age or older. The average household size was 2.73. There were 30,074 families (67.9% of all households); the average family size was 3.22.

The population was spread out, with 28,000 people (22.9%) under the age of 18, 10,946 people (9.0%) aged 18 to 24, 35,834 people (29.4%) aged 25 to 44, 32,903 people (27.0%) aged 45 to 64, and 14,384 people (11.8%) who were 65 years of age or older. The median age was 37.0 years. For every 100 females, there were 98.8 males. For every 100 females age 18 and over, there were 97.0 males.

There were 47,125 housing units at an average density of 1,542.8 per square mile (595.7 per square kilometer), of which 44,278 were occupied, of which 27,069 (61.1%) were owner-occupied, and 17,209 (38.9%) were occupied by renters. The homeowner vacancy rate was 1.9%; the rental vacancy rate was 7.0%. 71,004 people (58.2% of the population) lived in owner-occupied housing units and 50,016 people (41.0%) lived in rental housing units.

== Government ==
In the California State Legislature, Concord is in the 9th senatorial district, represented by Democrat Tim Grayson, and in the 15th Assembly district, represented by Democrat Anamarie Avila Farias.

Federally, Concord is in California's 10th congressional district, represented by Democrat Mark DeSaulnier.

=== Politics ===
In 2017, Concord had 65,061 registered voters with 31,759 (48.8%) registered as Democrats, 14,447 (22.2%) registered as Republicans, and 15,623 (24%) no party preference voters.

== Economy ==
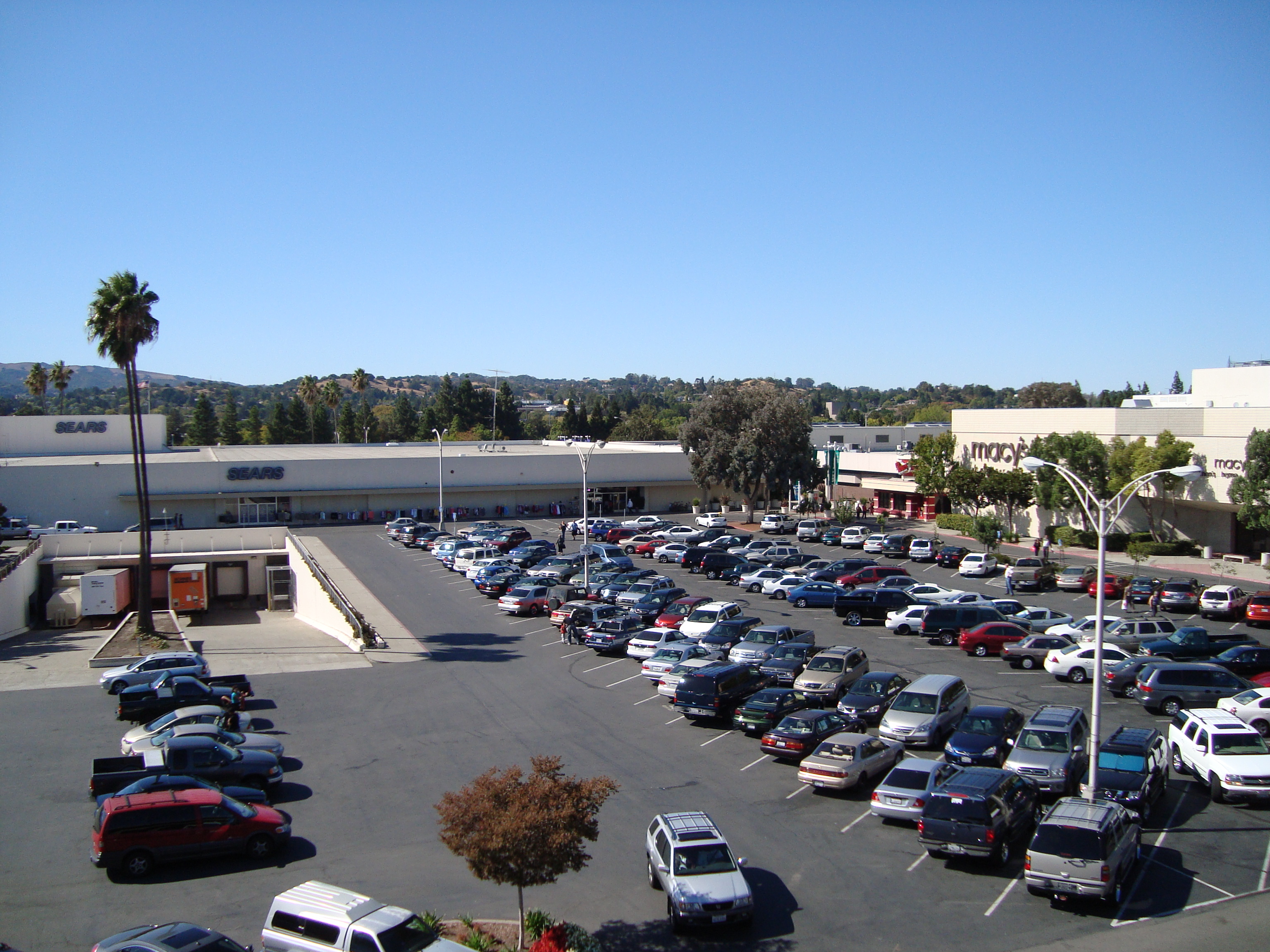
Sunvalley Shopping Center

Concord has been primarily a bedroom community for San Francisco and Oakland over the last forty years, but during the last decades, jobs within the city have increased. BevMo! is headquartered in Concord. Concord also has a strong retail sector including the Sunvalley Shopping Center, which used to be one of the 50 largest malls in the United States, auto dealerships, and Costco. The city is also home to the last Sears in California and one of only 5 remaining in the United States, and the last Fuddruckers in California.

=== Top employers ===
According to the city's 2024 Comprehensive Annual Financial Report, the top employers in the city are:

#	Employer	# of Employees
1	John Muir Medical Center	1,000 to 4,999
2	Mt. Diablo Unified School District	1,000 to 4,999
3	City of Concord	500 to 999
4	PG&E	500 to 999
5	County Connection	250 to 499
6	AssetMark	250 to 499
7	Cerus Corporation	250 to 499
8	Yard House	250 to 499
9	Athens Administrators	0 to 249
10	Swinerton	0 to 249

== Naval Weapons Station ==
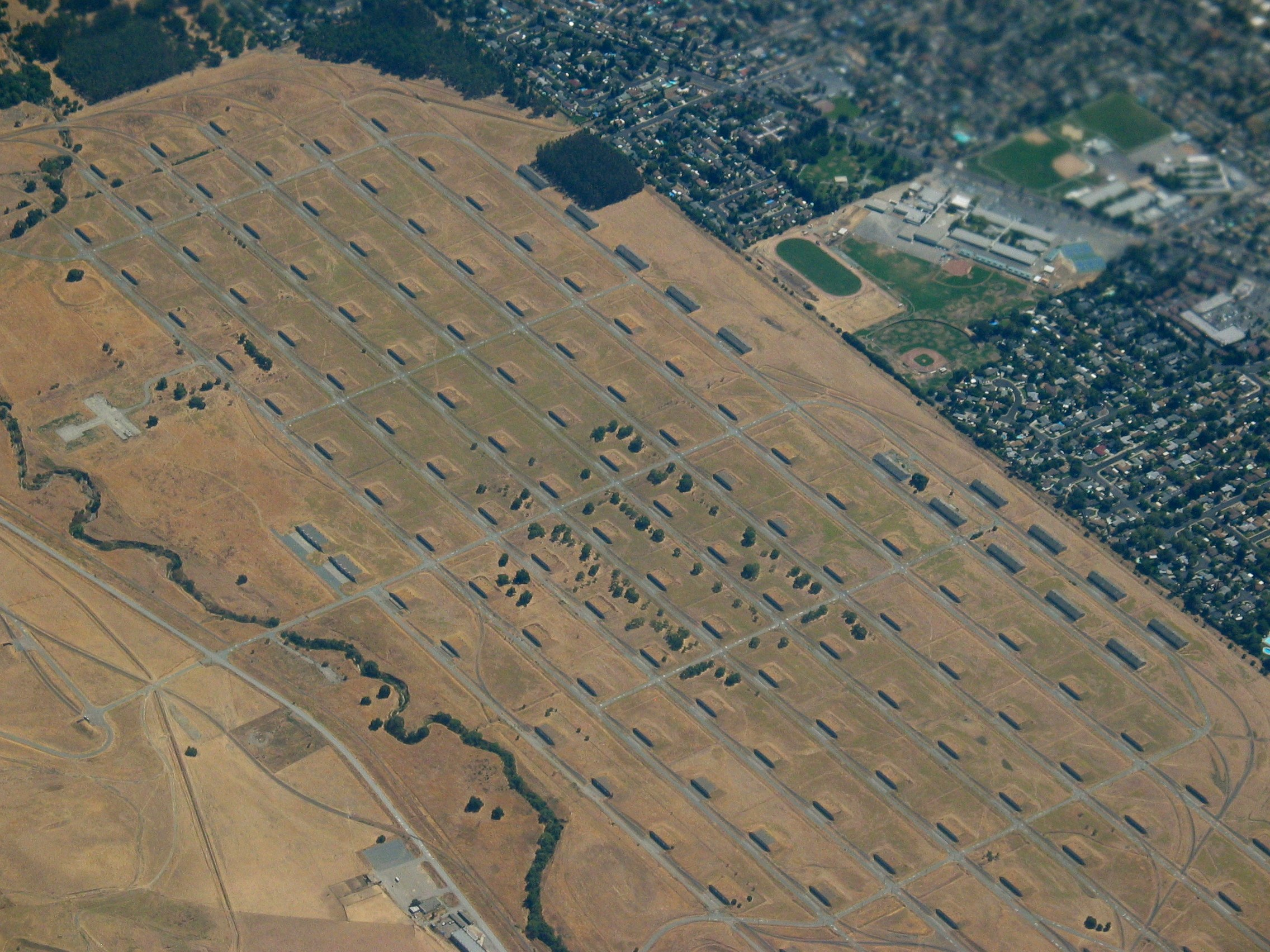
Aerial view of the Concord Naval Weapons Station

To the north of the city of Concord is the Concord Naval Weapons Station (CNWS), which was established in 1942. The station functioned as a World War II armament storage depot, supplying ships at Port Chicago. The CNWS supported war efforts during the Vietnam War and through the end of the Gulf War, processing and shipping out thousands of tons of material to Southeast Asia and the Middle East.

The station consists of two areas: the inland area (5,170 acres [2,092 hectares]) which is within the Concord city limits, and tidal area (7,630 acres [3,088 ha]). Because of changes in military operations, parts of the inland area began to be mothballed and by 1999, the CNWS had only a minimal contingent of military personnel. In 2007, the U.S. Federal Government announced that the inland portion of the CNWS will be closed. The tidal area of the base is not scheduled for closure. The tidal area was transferred to the U.S. Army Surface Deployment and Distribution Command (SDDC) and is now known as Military Ocean Terminal Concord (MOTCO). The city is working on a reuse plan that may include developing the land while keeping a large portion for open-space and parks projects. The city has had many meetings on this subject and any plan for reuse is subject to approval by the Navy.

== Transportation ==
Until 1995, the city was the eastern terminus of the Concord line of Bay Area Rapid Transit (BART) commuter train system; the line has since been extended eastward to Pittsburg/Bay Point in 1996 and Antioch in 2018. The County Connection provides limited public transportation in the city and to other points in the county. Buses run from the North Concord BART station to Martinez, the county seat.

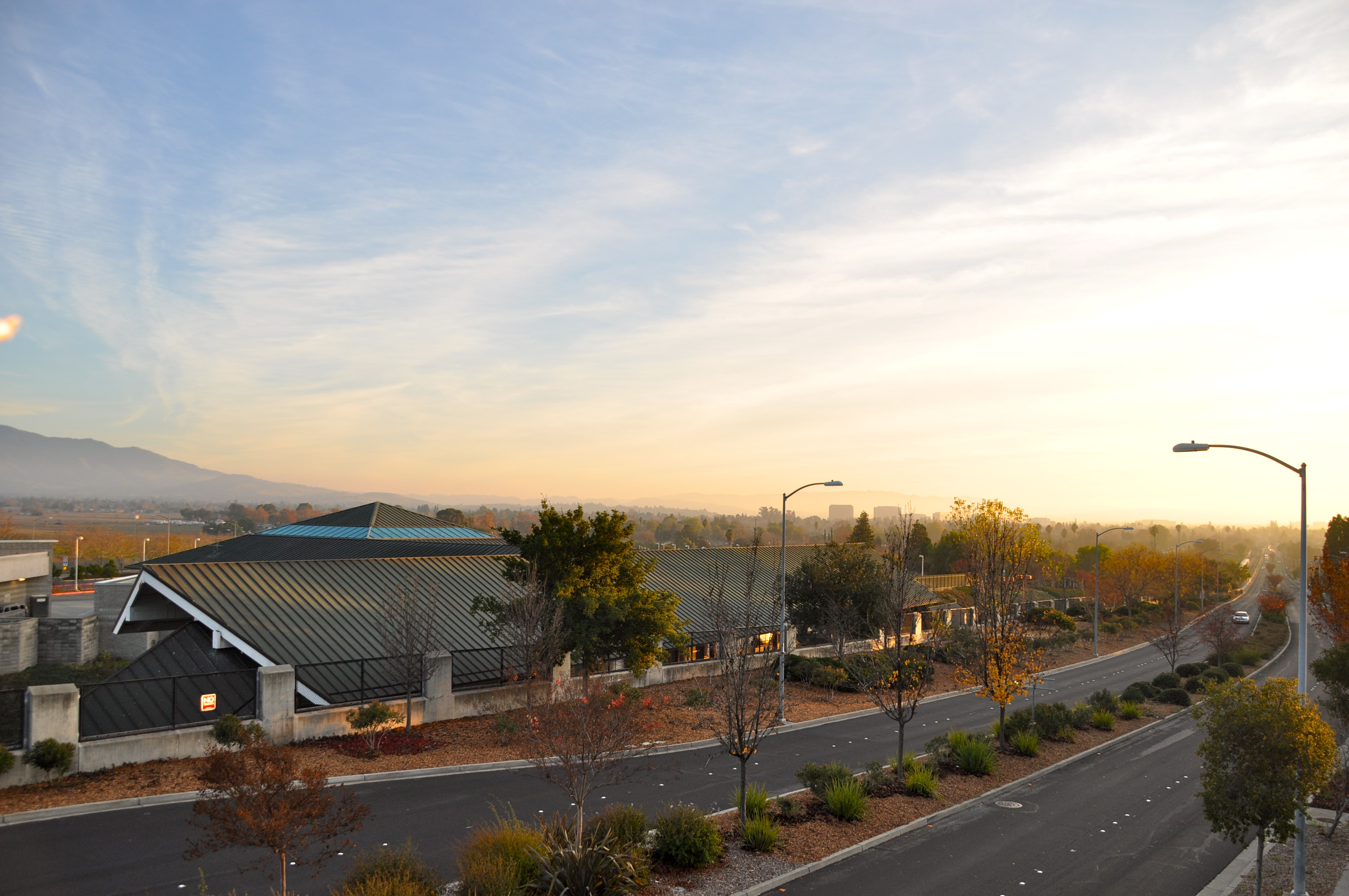
Overlooking the North Concord BART Station

Main thoroughfares include Willow Pass Road, Concord Avenue, Concord Boulevard, Clayton Road, Monument Boulevard, Ygnacio Valley Road, Oak Grove Road and Treat Boulevard. The city is also served by I-680, and state highways 4 and 242.

Buchanan Field Airport is a public county-owned airfield in the City of Concord. It is served by JSX, and previously served by American Eagle, WestAir Commuter Airlines, Pacific Southwest Airlines (PSA) and later by PSA successor USAir with the latter two airlines operating nonstop jet service between the airfield and Los Angeles International Airport (LAX).

== Media ==
=== News ===
The city of Concord is served by the daily newspaper the East Bay Times (formerly the Contra Costa Times) published by Bay Area News Group-East Bay (part of the Media News Group, Denver, Colorado), with offices in Walnut Creek. The paper was originally run and owned by the Lesher family. Since the death of Dean Lesher in 1993, the paper has had several owners. The publisher also issues a weekly paper, the Concord Transcript for Concord and nearby Clayton.

=== Radio ===
Concord is primarily served by radio stations from the San Francisco and Sacramento markets. The Clayton Valley Charter High School operates a student-run rock station licensed to Concord, KVHS. The city is also served by KKDV, a Walnut Creek-based rebroadcaster of country station KBAY. AM station KABN formerly operated from 1963 to 2004.

=== Television ===
Concord is served by television stations broadcasting primarily out of San Francisco, Sacramento, and San Jose. Over-the-air reception is difficult in many parts of the city due to hills on either side of the valley.

The sole Concord-licensed television station, KTNC, is an owned-and-operated station of Tri-State Christian Television; it had broadcast from the top of Mount Diablo. In 2017, the station's broadcast spectrum was sold in the FCC's spectrum incentive auction; the station now shares a signal with KCNS, KMTP-TV, and KEMO-TV on the Sutro Tower in San Francisco, maintaining its virtual channel 42.

== Education ==
Concord is served by the Mount Diablo Unified School District (MDUSD). Among the MDUSD schools is Mt. Diablo High School, opened in 1901 and currently home to four academies, including the Digital Safari Academy, a three-year program involving the integration of multimedia with the core curriculum through integrated, project-based learning.

Beyond MDUSD schools, Clayton Valley Charter High School is also home to several acclaimed academies. Catholic schools De La Salle High School for boys and Carondelet High School for girls are also located here. De La Salle's football team holds the U.S. record winning streak of 151 games, set between 1992 and 2004. During that span, De La Salle won 12 California North Coast sectional championships and was named national champion five different times (once by ESPN, four times by USA Today). In August 2014, a Hollywood film titled When the Game Stands Tall was released with the plot line based on their 151-game winning streak.

California State University, East Bay has a campus in Concord.

Concord High School won the 2010 Northern California Boys Division II Football Championship, coached by Brian Hamilton. Ygnacio Valley High School won the 1987 Northern California Boys Division I Basketball Championship, coached by Jim Grace.

=== Public libraries ===
The Concord Library of the Contra Costa County Library is located in Concord. The library is adjacent to the Concord Civic Center.

== Arts and culture ==
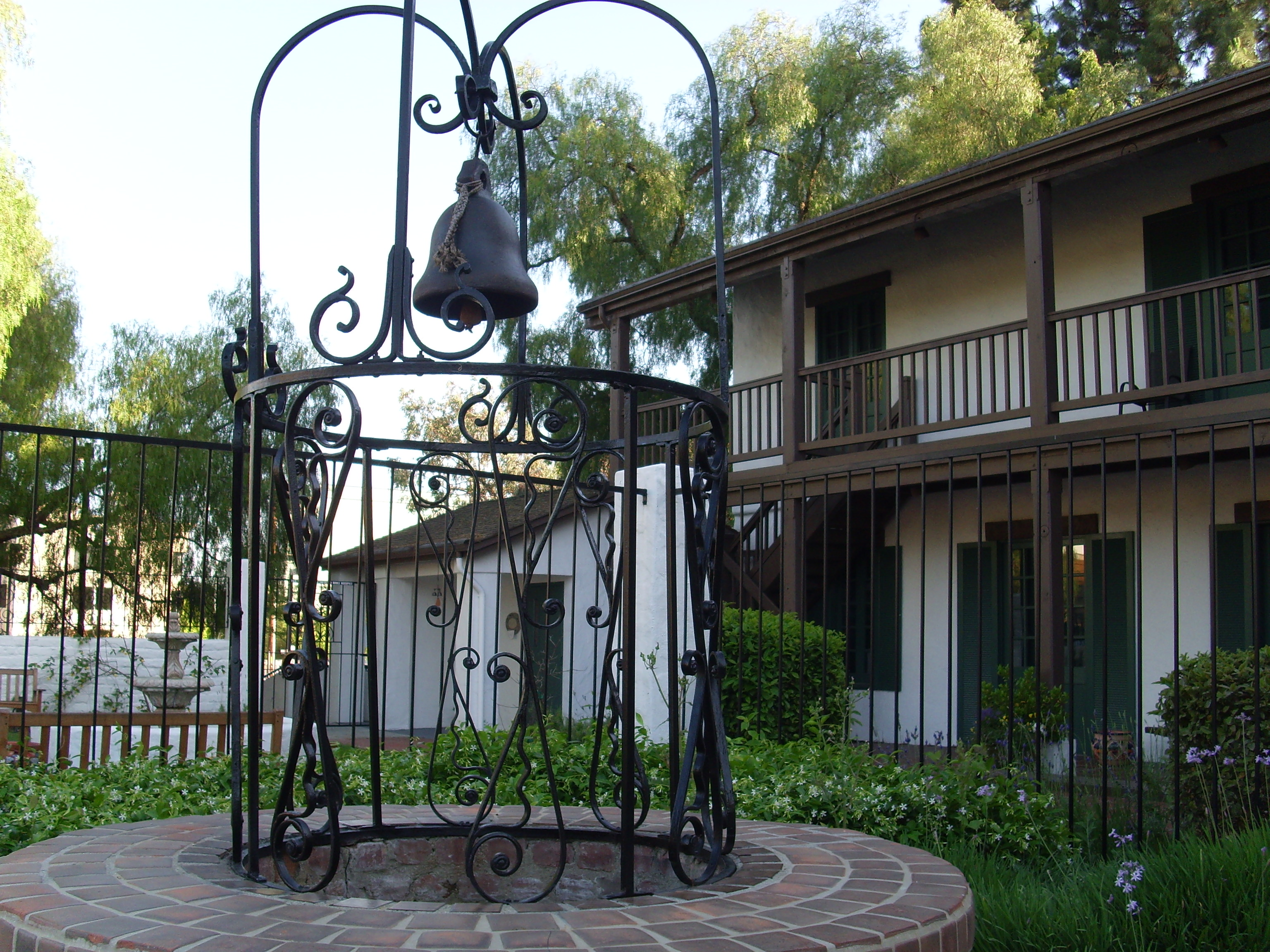
The Pacheco Adobe, built 1835 on Rancho Monte del Diablo

Concord is the home of the annual Concord Jazz Festival and was the home of the Concord Records jazz record label until it was bought in 1999. Jazz musician Dave Brubeck was born in Concord and in 2006 a park adjacent to Concord High School on Concord Boulevard was renamed in his honor.

Concord is also home to the 21-time World Champion Blue Devils Drum and Bugle Corps. The corps is made up of talented musicians from around the world. The Concord Blue Devils are the most decorated drum and bugle corps in the history of Drum Corps International.

The Concord Pavilion, a 12,500-seat outdoor amphitheater designed by Frank Gehry, hosts concerts and community events, beginning with the Concord Jazz Festival in 1975.

The Public-access television channel is operated through TelVue Virtual Television Networks.

The headquarters of the Kabul Soccer Club is located in Concord.

One of two variants of the "cheese zombie" baked good was invented in Concord.

=== Matteo's Dream ===
Matteo's Dream is an all-abilities playground in an urban park in Concord, named for Matteo Henderson, a boy with serious disabilities including blindness, cerebral palsy, and cognitive development. Persons with disabilities are able to drive their wheelchairs directly onto the structure. Features of the playground are specially engineered to accommodate people with various disabilities.

== Points of interest ==
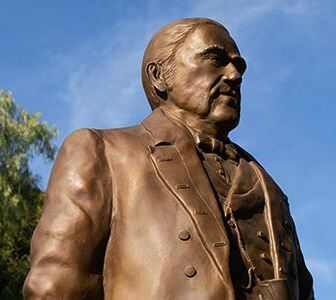
Statue of Salvio Pacheco at Plaza de Todos Santos

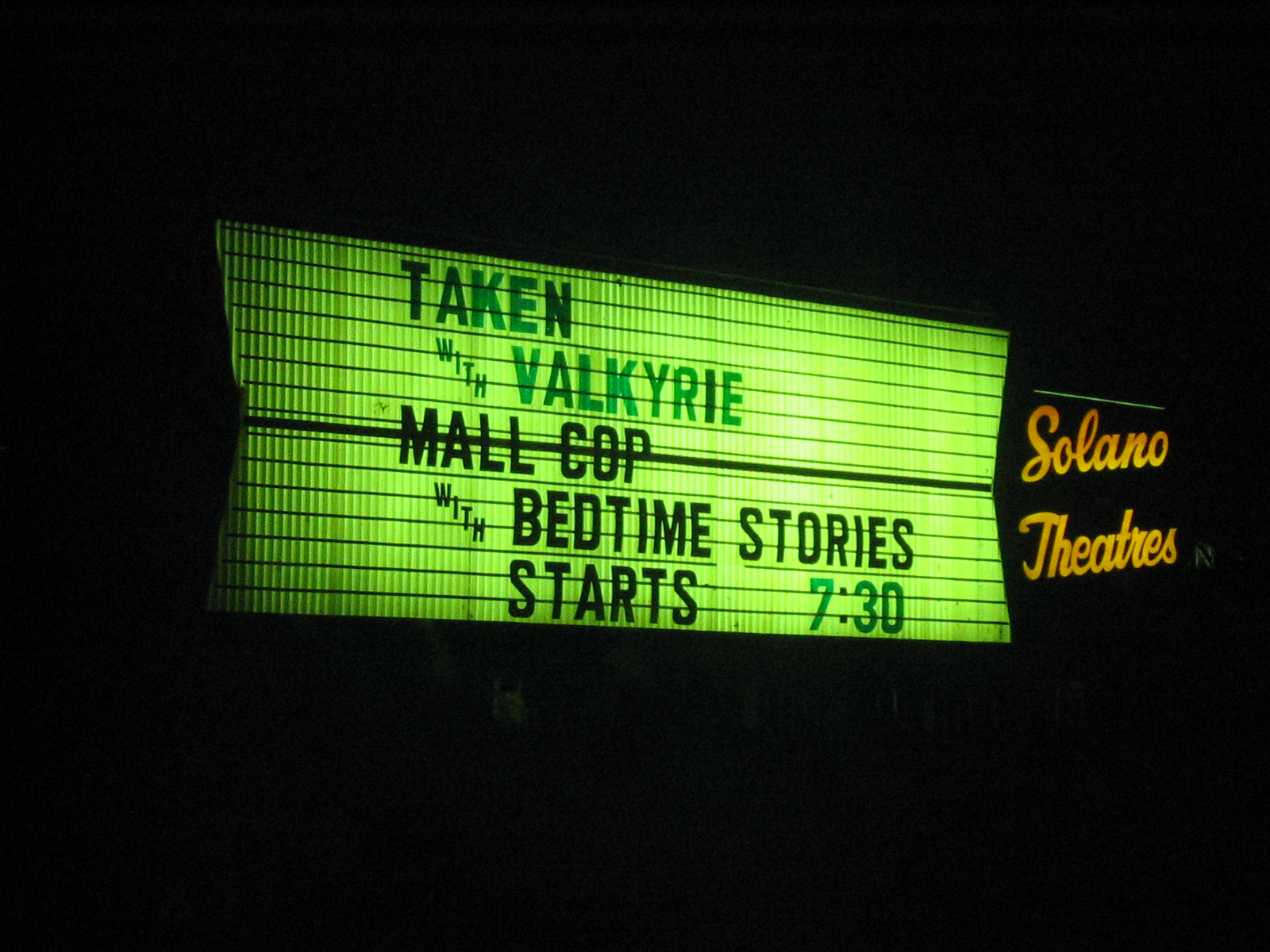
West Wind Solano Drive-In theatre sign at night time

- Baldwin Community Park and the Concord Senior Center
- Blue Devils Drum and Bugle Corps
- Buchanan Field Airport
- Camp Concord at South Lake Tahoe, a family-oriented summer camp, although not located in Concord, is operated by the city.
- Concord Pavilion – amphitheater, a major regional concert venue formerly known as the Sleep Train Pavilion and as the Chronicle Pavilion at Concord.
- Concord Skatepark
- Dave Brubeck Park
- Don Francisco Galindo House
- Don Salvio Pacheco Adobe
- Hillcrest Park – home to Matteo's Dream, a playground for children of all abilities
- Lime Ridge Open Space
- Markham Nature Park and Arboretum
- Matteo's Dream – all-abilities playground
- Mt. Diablo State Park
- Newhall Community Park
- Port Chicago Naval Magazine National Memorial
- Rick Sears Memorial Park
- Shiva Murugan Temple
- Six Flags Hurricane Harbor Concord
- Starting point of the Iron Horse Regional Trail
- Sunvalley Mall
- Todos Santos Plaza – site of farmer's market, concerts, and movies
- West Wind Solano Drive-In Theater
- Willow Pass Community Park
- Ygnacio Valley Park

== Sister city ==
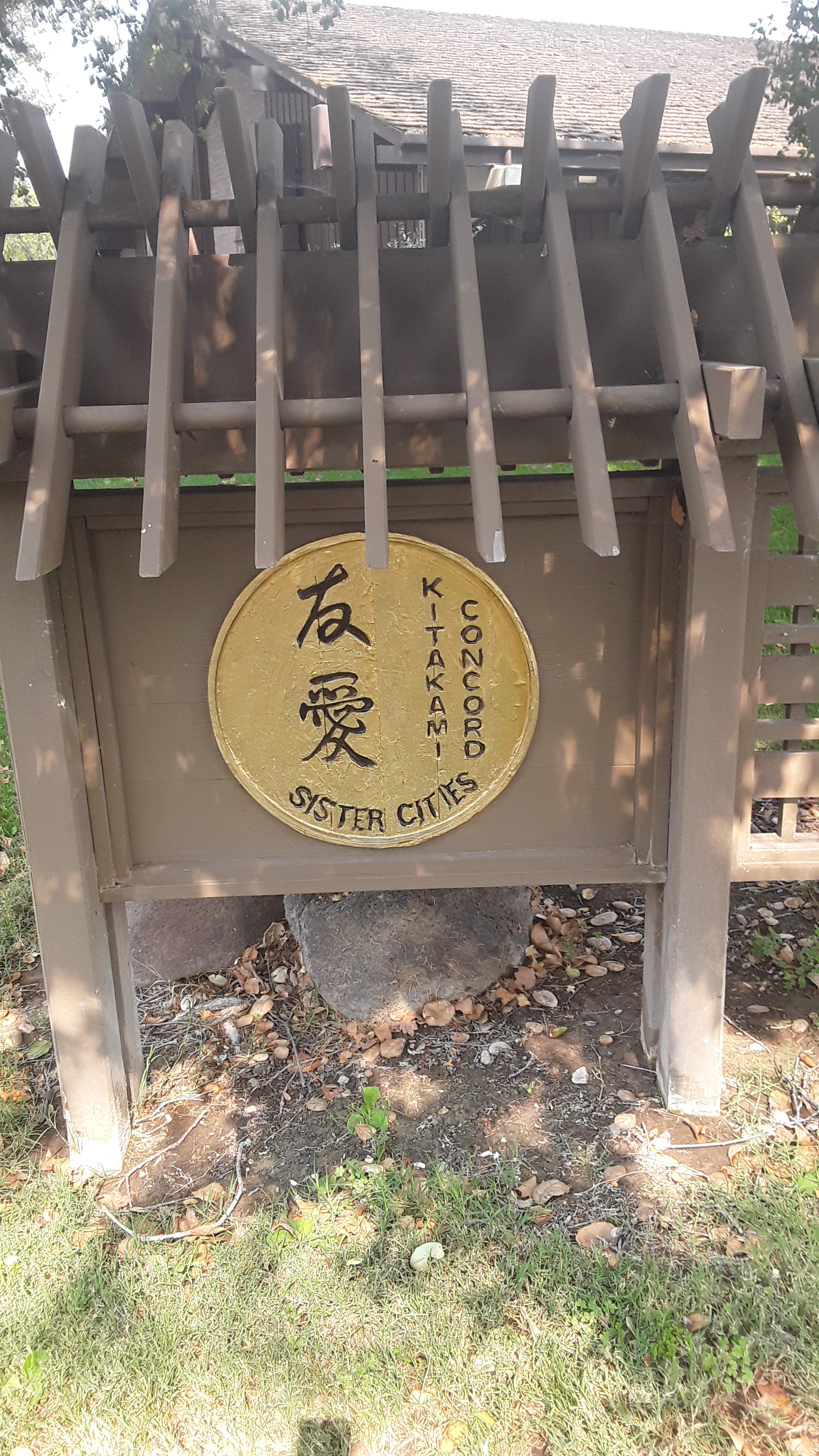
Artwork produced by Japanese and American citizens to celebrate the sister city relationship between Concord and Kitakami, located at the civic center

In 1974, Concord became a sister city with Kitakami, Iwate, in Japan. The city established a small Japanese-style park in the city, and placed half of a sculpture, The Communion Bridge, in it. The matching half of the bridge is in Kitakami.

Every five years, a delegation from Concord visits Kitakami and operates a student exchange program.

== Notable people ==
- Carlos Alazraqui, comedian, television actor, voice-over artist, voice of Taco Bell chihuahua
- Blake Anderson, comedian, writer, producer, and actor was born in Concord
- Autopsy, death metal band
- George Barnes, jazz musician, long-time resident
- Dave Brubeck, festival promoter, jazz musician, orchestra leader; born in Concord
- Tom Candiotti MLB Pitcher, Milwaukee Brewers, Cleveland Indians, Toronto Blue Jays, Oakland Athletics and Los Angeles Dodgers.
- Gil Castillo, mixed martial artist has been a resident
- Natalie Coughlin, Olympic gold-medalist, has been a resident
- Mark DeSaulnier, U.S. representative; former California state senator, assembylman, Contra Costa County supervisor, and Concord city councilor
- Death Angel, thrash-metal band
- Sonya Eddy, actress best known for playing Epiphany Johnson on General Hospital was born in Concord
- Stefan Frei, Swiss-born soccer player
- Tom Hanks, Oscar-winning actor, producer, and director was born in Concord
- Charley Koontz, television and film actor, was born and raised in Concord
- Eva Marie, female professional wrestler formerly signed to the WWE
- Cass McCombs, singer and songwriter was born in Concord
- Brent Mydland, keyboardist for the Grateful Dead from 1979 to 1990
- Negativland, experimental music group
- Reed Nesbit, urologist, pioneer of transurethral resection of the prostate
- Kyle Newacheck, TV writer, was born in Concord
- Natalie Nunn, reality tv star, entrepreneur, producer
- Salvio Pacheco, historically important Californio ranchero and founder of Concord
- Julie Strain, actress and model

== See also ==
- List of cities and towns in California
- List of cities and towns in the San Francisco Bay Area
