= Sunvalley Shopping Center =

Shopping center in Concord, California, U.S.

Coordinates: 37°58′2″N 122°3′46″W

- Location: Concord, California, United States
- Opened: August 5, 1967; 59 years ago
- Developer: Taubman Company
- Manager: Spinoso Real Estate Group
- Owner: Spinoso Real Estate Group
- Num. of stores: 160
- Num. of anchor tenants: 4
- Floor area: 1,333,000 square feet (123,800 m^{2})
- Floors: 2 (3 in both Macy's locations and JCPenney, closed 3rd floor in Sears)
- Website: www.shopsunvalley.com

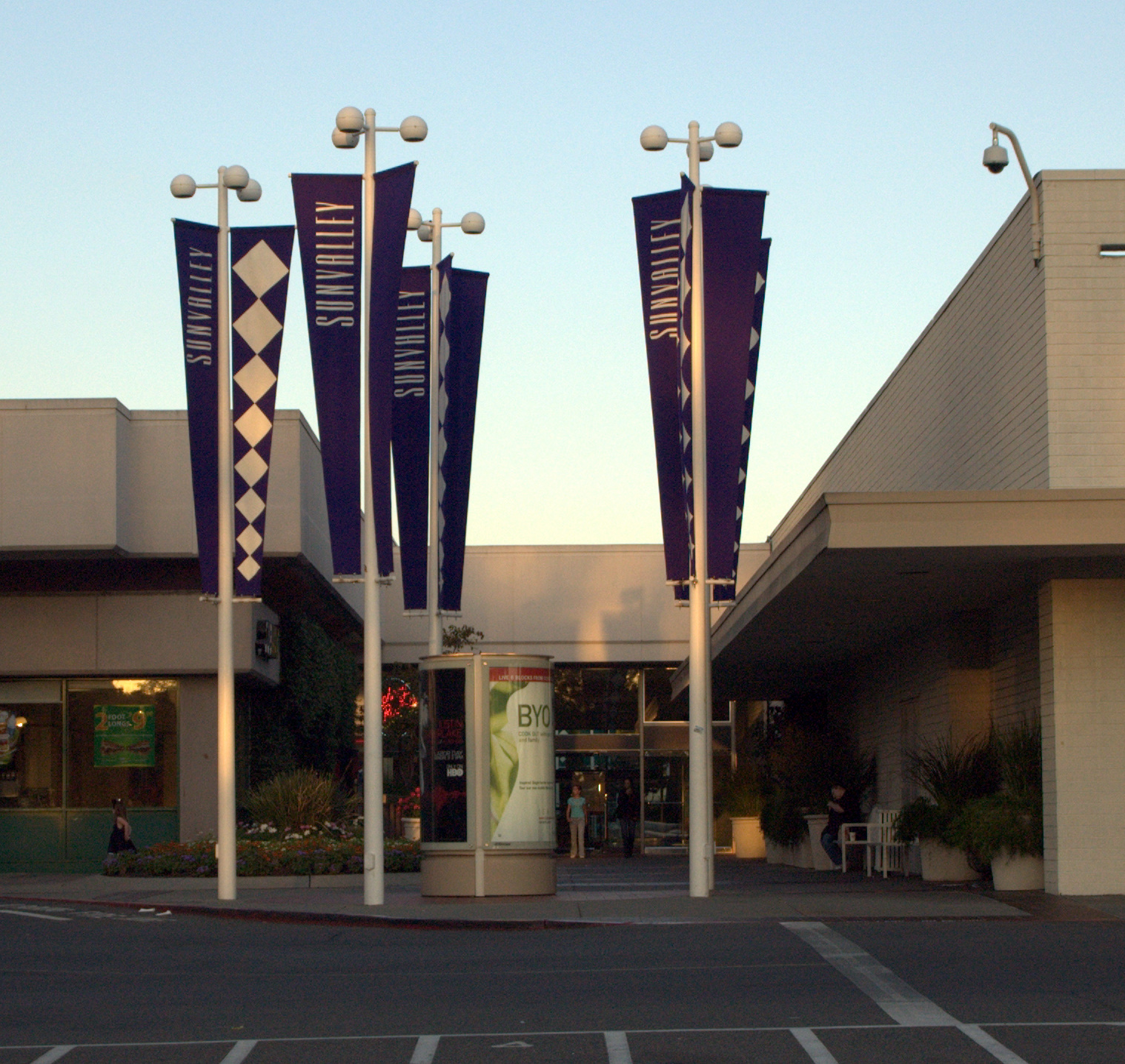
West entrance

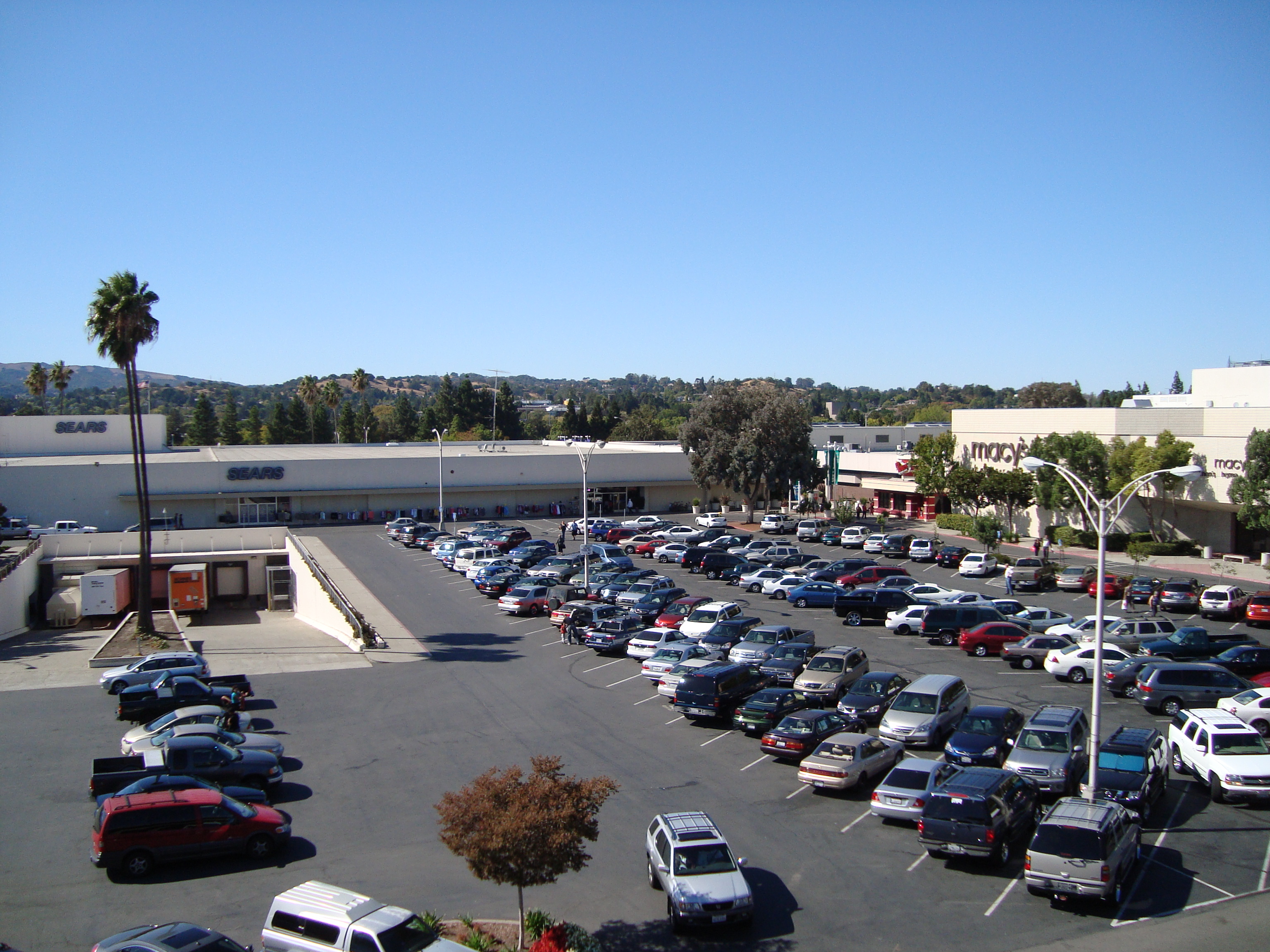
Northeast side of mall from parking structure

Sunvalley Shopping Center, or more commonly Sunvalley Mall, is a regional shopping center located in Concord, California (one of the suburbs in the San Francisco Bay Area, in east central Contra Costa County). Located off Interstate 680, Sunvalley is owned and operated by Spinoso Real Estate Group and is anchored by two Macy's locations, JCPenney, and notably one of the last five remaining Sears, of which is the only remaining one in California. The total square footage of the mall is 1.333 million square feet.

== History ==
At the time of its construction, Sunvalley Shopping Center was said to be the largest air-conditioned regional shopping center in the world. Developed by A. Alfred Taubman, the shopping center opened on August 5, 1967 with a performance by Tony Martin and is 1,333,000 feet (406,000 meters) on two floors. In the mall's early days it had 40 vendors including three anchor stores: a 233,000-foot (71,000 m) Macy's, a 241,000-foot (73,000 m) Sears, and a 216,000-foot (66,000 m) JCPenney on three floors. A fourth anchor tenant was built in 1981: a three-floor, 180,000-foot (55,000 m) Emporium Capwell, which operated as The Emporium from 1990 to 1995 until the department store's sale to Federated Department Stores; this location later became a Macy's Men's/Home/Cellar/Backstage, reducing the number of different anchor tenants in the mall to three. A World's Fare food court made up of international restaurants also included staples like donuts and Kentucky Fried Chicken; stores included piano-organ stores, an art gallery, a pet shop, a post office, an ice skating rink, cages of rare birds, and water fountains in numerous locations. The SunValley Cinema had 1,500 seats. The parking lot has 9,000 spaces.

On December 23, 1985, a twin-engine Beechcraft 95-A55 crashed into the mall after missing its initial landing attempt at nearby Buchanan Field. Seven people died, including three on the plane, and seventy-seven were injured. The accident caused $3.5 million in damage to the mall.

In 1991, the mall completed a two-year $40 million renovation that included installing 198 skylights, Italian marble walkways, and chrome and glass railings.

In 2012, Sunvalley Shopping Center completed a multimillion-dollar renovation that included new mall entrances with illuminated signage, seating, and landscaping. Parking amenities were also enhanced with energy-efficient LED lighting on the upper east parking deck, new exterior directional signage, and landscaping. Inside the center, the central grand court area was completely renovated with the addition of Wi-Fi, device charging, and a full-service customer service desk. The amount of seating throughout the center was doubled and new faux landscaping was installed.

In 2016, the mall opened a new food court containing restaurants such as Chicken Connection, Charleys Philly Steaks, and Lotus Express. ROUND1, an entertainment center, opened in the former Sports Authority space.

On May 24, 2021, the Concord Police Department responded to a shooting inside the Sunvalley Shopping Center. CBS affiliate KPIX-TV reported that only one was injured, and the entire shopping center was placed on lockdown initially. Local authorities reported that the suspect had fled, reporting that there is no danger to patrons or mall employees. One victim, a young black male, was seen on surveillance video being loaded into an ambulance. The Concord Police Department later tweeted saying that "there is no danger to the mall at that moment, and were under investigation".

On December 31, 2021 a second shooting was reported, leaving one person injured. The gunman has not been arrested. Sun Valley was put on lockdown and remained closed for the night. It reopened the next morning.

A November 2025 article associated with the San Francisco Chronicle brought up Sunvalley Shopping Center's financial problems in spite of the mall's 87 percent occupancy rate.
