= Florence Nightingale David =

British statistician

- Born: 23 August 1909; Ivington, Herefordshire, England
- Died: 23 July 1993 (aged 83); Kensington, California, USA
- Education: Bedford College, London
- Awards: Elizabeth L. Scott award
- Scientific career
- Fields: Statistics
- Doctoral advisor: Karl Pearson
- Doctoral students: Gwilym Jenkins; Colin Mallows

Florence Nightingale David, also known as F. N. David (23 August 1909 – 23 July 1993) was an English statistician. She was head of the Statistics Department at the University of California, Riverside between 1970 – 77 and her research interests included the history of probability and statistical ideas.

== Early life and education ==
David was born on 23 August 1909 in Ivington, near Leominster, England. Her parents were Florence Maude and William Richard David who were both Elementary School head teachers. David was named after Florence Nightingale, who was a friend of her parents and a pioneering statistician.

David was tutored privately by a local parson, beginning at age five. By that age she already knew some arithmetic, so she began with algebra. Since David already knew English, the parson taught her Latin and Greek. At the age of ten, she entered to formal schooling at Colyton Grammar School. She studied mainly mathematics for three years, with the aim of becoming an actuary, but at that time the actuarial firms only accepted men. She earned a degree in mathematics from Bedford College for Women in 1931.

David received a scholarship and continued her studies with Karl Pearson at University College, London, as his research assistant. In this function she produced tables for the correlation coefficient. When Pearson retired, his son Egon, and Ronald Fisher, took over Karl's duties. After Karl Pearson died in 1934, David returned to the Biometrics laboratory to work with Jerzy Neyman, submitting her four most recently published papers as her doctoral (PhD) thesis, and earned a doctorate in 1938.

== Career ==
Working for Karl Pearson, F. N. David computed solutions to complicated multiple integrals, and the distribution of the correlation coefficients. As a result, her first book was released in 1938, called Tables of the Correlation Coefficient. All the calculations were done on a hand-cranked mechanical calculator known as a Brunsviga.

During World War II, David worked as an Experimental Officer in the Ordnance Board for the Ministry of Supply, a Senior Statistician for the Research and Experiments Department for the Ministry of Home Security; a Member of the Land Mines Committee of the Scientific Advisory Council, and as a Scientific Advisor on Mines to the Military Experimental Establishment. In late 1939 when war had started but England had not yet been attacked, she created statistical models to predict the possible consequences of bombs exploding in high density populations such as the big cities of England and especially London. From these models, she determined estimates of harm to humans and other damage. This included the possible numbers living and dead, the reactions to fires and damaged buildings as well as damages to communications, utilities such as telephones, water, gas, electricity and sewers. As a result, when the Germans bombed London in 1940 and 1941, vital services were kept going and her models were updated and modified with the evidence from the real harms and real damage.

After World War II she returned to University College London and became a professor of statistics in 1962. From 1958 to 1967 she split her time between London and Berkeley, California, where she held a visiting position at the University of California Department of Statistics and Applied Climatology and Forestry Division. In 1968 she moved to California permanently and became a professor, and in 1970 the chair, in the Department of Statistics at the University of California, Riverside, and was the book review editor for the journal Biometrics for four years.

By 1977 she retired and became professor emeritus and Research Associate in Biostatistics at the University of California at Berkeley, where she continued to teach and do research in Biostatistics.

David died of lung cancer on 23 July 1993 in Kensington, Contra Costa County, California.

== Awards and recognition ==
In 1954 she was elected as a Fellow of the American Statistical Association. She was also a Fellow of the Institute of Mathematical Statistics.

In conjunction with other numerous academic honours, in 1992 David won the first Elizabeth L. Scott Award "...for her efforts in opening the door to women in statistics; for contributions to the professions over many years; for contributions to education, science, and public service; for research contributions to combinatorics, statistical methods, applications and understanding history; and her spirit as a lecturer and as a role model.". The university named a library for her, and in 2001 established the Florence Nightingale David Award.

== Contributions ==
David's research resulted in advances in combinatorics, including a clear exposition of complicated methods. She studied the Correlation coefficient, and computed solutions of complicated multiple integrals, using the distribution of the correlation coefficient.

David investigated the origins and history of probability and statistical ideas. She wrote a book on history of probability, using problems thought of by famous mathematicians and scientists like Cardano and Galileo. It was called Games, Gods and Gambling: The Origins and History of Probability. She "speculat[ed] that gambling may be the first invention of human society. Her clue to this is the talus. This most common randomizer of ancient times is a predecessor of the die: the astragalus or talus is the 'knucklebone' or heel bone of a running animal. In creatures such as deer, horse, oxen, sheep and hartebeest this bone is so formed that when it is thrown to land on a level surface it can come to rest in only four ways. Well polished and often engraved examples are regularly found on the sites of ancient Egypt. Tomb illustrations and scoring boards make it virtually certain that these were used for gaming."

== Personal life ==
David was lesbian. During her time at Berkeley, she lived with Evelyn Fix until the latter's passing in 1965.

== Publications ==
David published ten books and more than 100 papers, including:

- 1938: Extension of the Markoff theorem on least squares
- 1948: (with N.L. Johnson) The probability integral transformation when parameters are estimated from the sample
- 1949: Probability theory of statistical methods
- 1951: Probability theory for statistical methods
- 1952: The truncated poisson
- 1953: A statistical primer
- 1954: (with P.G. Moore) Notes on contagious distributions in plant populations
- 1954: (with N.L. Johnson) Statistical Treatment of Censored Data Part I. Fundamental Formulae
- 1961: (with Evelyn Fix) Rank correlation and regression in a nonnormal surface
- 1961: (with Egon Sharpe Pearson) Elementary statistical exercises
- 1962: (with D.E. Barton) Combinatorial Chance ISBN 978-0-85264-057-9
- 1962: Games, Gods and Gambling ISBN 978-0-85264-171-2.
- 1966: Symmetric function and allied tables
- 1968: Normal centroids, medians and scores for ordinal data
- 1971: A first course in statistics
