= Evelyn Fix =

Statistician

- Born: January 27, 1904; Duluth, Minnesota, United States
- Died: December 30, 1965 (aged 61); California, United States
- Education: University of Minnesota; University of California, Berkeley
- Known for: K-nearest neighbors algorithm Fix–Neyman model
- Scientific career
- Fields: Statistics
- Workplaces: University of California, Berkeley
- Doctoral advisor: Jerzy Neyman

Evelyn Fix (January 27, 1904 – December 30, 1965) was a statistician. She was born in Duluth, Minnesota and earned her A.B. in mathematics at the University of Minnesota in 1924. One year later she earned an M.S. in education and became a high school teacher. She earned an M.A. in mathematics, also from the University of Minnesota in 1933. She obtained a Ph.D. in 1948 at the University of California, Berkeley, and joined the statistics faculty there. She was appointed as an assistant professor in 1951 and in 1963 she was promoted to professor of statistics. She died of a heart attack on December 30, 1965.

During World War II, Fix worked as a research assistant in the Mathematics Department at the University of California, Berkeley on projects conducted as part of work conducted for the "Applied Mathematics Panel of the National Defense Research Committee." Fix was one of two women who were the first assistant professors hired by the statistics group within the Mathematics Department in 1951. Statistics became a separate department in 1955. In 1951 Fix and Joseph Hodges, Jr. published their groundbreaking paper "Discriminatory Analysis. Nonparametric Discrimination: Consistency Properties," which defined the nearest neighbor rule, an important method that would go on to become a key piece of machine learning technologies, the k-Nearest Neighbor (k-NN) algorithm.

She was a Fellow of the Institute of Mathematical Statistics.

== Personal life ==
In her latter years, Fix was the life partner of famous English statistician F.N. David who worked at the same department. They lived together in Kensington outside Berkeley.
