= Kensington Ladies' Erotica Society =

The Kensington Ladies' Erotica Society was an erotica writers' group founded in Kensington, California in 1976 whose aims were to create erotic literature written for and by women. The group became the first to publish collections on sexuality for the middle-aged woman. Founded by Sabina Sedgewick, members also included: Rose Solomon, Bernadette Vaughan, Nell Port, and Elvira Pearson (all pseudonyms).

Sabina Sedgewick at the time was a librarian cataloging erotica for UC Berkeley's Bancroft Library. She found herself speculating whether women found erotic literature as appealing as did men. She asked this question aloud at a New Year's faculty party at her home and future member, Nell Port, encouraged her to form a group to address that question. When the group first began meeting, participants were in their 40s. Most were married. Some were homemakers and others had day jobs. They originally began as an erotic reading group, however, after dutifully reading Anaïs Nin, Henry Miller, Nancy Friday and others, along with Penthouse, Playboy and Chic, the newly formed group decided that none of it spoke to contemporary American women. Sabina urged them to try their hand at writing their own erotic fantasies. The group would meet monthly, sharing their poems, short stories, recipes, and more.

Although not originally intending to publish, member Rose Solomon accumulated the group's writings, and by 1983 there was enough for their first book, Ladies' Home Erotica. It became a best-seller.

The 10 original members (now seven due to two moving away and one dying) were considered pioneers of female erotica. The group has published 3 more collections of their erotica. Now, documents of the Society have been collected and archived at San José State University.

== Members ==
- Sabrina Sedgewick (Founder, pseudonym Annegret Ogden)
- Ann Gordon
- Nicola Hamilton
- Judy McBride
- Frances Row (pseudonym: Claudia Morton)
- Laurel Cook (pseudonym: Elvira Pearson)
- Nanelle Bunnin (pseudonym: Nell Port)
- Pat Adler (pseudonym: Rose Solomon)
- Sascha Dorgeloh (pseudonym: Bernadette Vaughan)
- Velora Moore (pseudonym Jenna York)

== Published works ==
- 1984: Ladies' Home Erotica: Tales, Recipes, and Other Mischiefs by Older Women (later published as Ladies' Own Erotica February, 1986)
- 1985: The Erotic Companion: An Illustrated Write-Your-Own Erotic Journal
- 1986: Look Homeward Erotica
- 2002: Sex, Death, and Other Distractions
