= Ivington =

Village in Herefordshire, England

Coordinates: 52.2033°N 2.772°W

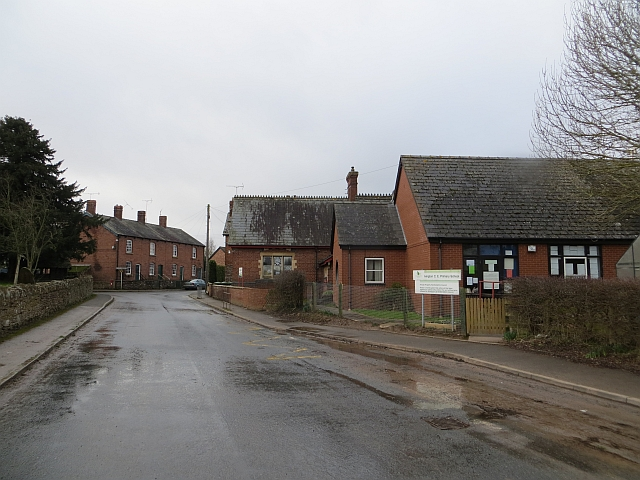
- Ivington village

- Location within Herefordshire
- OS grid reference: SO472564
- Shire county: Herefordshire
- Region: West Midlands
- Country: England
- Sovereign state: United Kingdom
- Post town: LEOMINSTER
- Postcode district: HR6
- Dialling code: 01568
- Police: West Mercia
- Fire: Hereford and Worcester
- Ambulance: West Midlands

Ivington (/ˈɪvɪŋtən/) is a village in the county of Herefordshire, England, approximately 13 miles (21 km) north of Hereford. It is about 2 miles (3 km) south-west of Leominster. The population as of the 2011 census was included within Leominster. Ivington has a small church dedicated to St. John, and a Church of England Primary School.

== Toponymy ==
Ivington was recorded as Ivintune in the Domesday Book of 1086, the name deriving from the Old English for "estate associated with a man called Ifa".

== Geography ==
Surrounding villages include Ivington Green, Stag Batch, Newtown and Brierley. Ivington lies just south of the River Arrow.

== Notable people ==
Statistician Florence Nightingale David was born in Ivington in 1909. Television presenter and writer Monty Don lives in Ivington.
