= Peer Portner =

British cardiologist (1940–2009)

- Died: February 9, 2009 (aged 69)
- Notable work: ventricular assist device

Peer Michael Portner (January 8, 1940 – February 9, 2009) was a heart researcher whose work led to the development of the ventricular assist device, an electrical pump that permits patients in heart failure to survive until a heart transplant could be performed.

Portner was born on January 8, 1940, in Mombasa, Kenya. In 1968, he was awarded doctorate in experimental nuclear physics from McGill University in Montreal, which was followed by a postdoctoral fellowship in nuclear physics at the University of Oxford.

Portner was hired as a senior physicist at Andros Inc., a research and development firm headquartered in Berkeley, California, that was taken over by Novacor in the 1980s. During the 1970s, first became involved in biomedical engineering while experimenting on a device that attached to the left ventricles of the hearts of laboratory cows in order to restore the heart's pumping ability while obviating the need to remove the heart's chambers.

By 1984, this had evolved into the left ventricular assist device (LVAD), which consisted of an electrical pump and bladder that was placed into the chest of the patient, connected by wires to a battery outside the patient's body. The LVAD replaced earlier devices that had run on compressed air, requiring a larger opening in the thoracic cavity that was more prone to infection. The first recipient, 51-year-old Robert St. Laurent, remained on the pump for eight days before his damaged heart was replaced in a transplant operation, and lived for 20 years in stable health before his death in 2004. St. Laurent had had a heart attack and what turned out to be unsuccessful coronary artery bypass surgery, leading to the successful implantation of the LVAD for the first time in a human. The heart St. Laurent received came from an 18-year-old college student who had been brain dead following a car accident.

He established the Novacor Medical Corporation in the 1980s to construct and distribute the device, serving as its president and chief executive before the company was acquired by Baxter Healthcare Corporation in 1988. After the takeover, Portner served as chairman of Baxter's Novacor division, where he continued to improve the device, making it easier to transport and allowing patients to wash, walk and be outside the hospital for significant periods of time. By the time of Portner's death, an estimated 1,800 Novacor devices had been implanted to allow for a transition to transplants and in other cases, with devices kept in patients for up to six years. Available since 1993, the wearable version lets patients return to a largely normal lifestyle outside of the hospital.

By 1987, the U.S. Food and Drug Administration had granted permission to use Novacor pumps on a case-by-case basis, with doctors at Presbyterian-University Hospital in Pittsburgh indicating that they would use the Novacor pump in lieu of Jarvik hearts until a human donor heart can be found.

Though the Novacor pump was ultimately not needed, Portner was on hand while President of Russia Boris Yeltsin was undergoing cardiac bypass surgery in 1996, ready to assist in case of emergency.

Portner served as president of the American Society for Artificial Internal Organs. O. H. Frazier, director of cardiovascular surgery research at The Texas Heart Institute in Houston and developer of Thoratec's HeartMate pump, stated that "Peer Portner was an original investigator of a lifesaving technology who contributed to the literature and first generation of these devices."

In 2008, Portner was awarded an honorary doctorate by the Dominican School of Philosophy and Theology and inducted into their College of Fellows.

Portner died at age 69 on February 9, 2009, at his home in Kensington, California, due to cancer. He was survived by his wife, two daughters; and three grandchildren.
