= Nina Dronkers =

American cognitive neuroscientist

Nina Dronkers is an American cognitive neuroscientist. She is known for her studies of aphasia (language impairments) and their application for understanding brain systems involved in normal language abilities. She is a professor in the Psychology Department at the University of California, Berkeley, and a faculty member of the Helen Wills Neuroscience Institute. She is also an Emerita Research Career Scientist of the Veterans Administration Northern California Health Care System where she established the Center for Aphasia and Related Disorders. She serves as a consultant for the Memory and Aging Center at UCSF Medical Center. In addition, she is an adjunct professor in the Department of Neurology, University of California, Davis, School of Medicine. She has published over 120 scientific papers and is the co-author with Lise Menn of a textbook: Psycholinguistics: Introduction and Applications, Second edition.

== Education ==
Nina Dronkers was born at Alta Bates hospital in Berkeley, California, in 1955 and grew up nearby in Kensington, California, where she attended K-12 public schools. She received her undergraduate degree in linguistics in 1976, her MA in Educational Psychology in 1978, and her PhD in neuropsychology in 1985, all from the University of California, Berkeley. In 1982 and 1999 she was a visiting scholar at the Max-Planck-Institut fur Psycholinguistik, Nijmegen, The Netherlands.

== Research ==
In the early part of her career, Dronkers questioned a long-held assumption about which areas of the brain were most critically involved in spoken language. In 1861, the French physician and neuroanatomist Paul Broca presented a paper describing two of his patients who had an expressive aphasia, difficulty in producing spoken language. In addition to a description of their impaired language. Broca presented autopsy findings, and noted that both patients had damage to the frontal lobe in the left hemisphere of the brain. Based on his careful work in documenting this brain-behavior relationship, the brain region became known as Broca's area, and expressive aphasia became known as Broca's aphasia.

Over 100 years later, Dronkers obtained permission to re-examine the brains of Broca's original patients. Fortunately, the brains had been preserved whole, although they had not been sliced and were required to remain so. With the help of French collaborators, Dronkers removed the brains from their preservation jars and placed them in a modern MRI scanner; the MRI images revealed that theses patients had suffered much more damage to the brain than Broca could have known from just studying the outer surface. Their lesions extended to deeper layers beyond the left frontal lobe, including portions of insular cortex and critical white matter pathways below the cortex.

In another peer-reviewed paper (2), Dronkers analyzed brain scans from several stroke patients who suffered from a speech production disorder known as apraxia of speech (AOS). AOS is a symptom observed in most patients who are diagnosed with Broca's aphasia. She found that, rather than Broca's area, this speech production disorder was associated with a portion of insular cortex which is tucked beneath the lateral surface of the brain. Like Broca's original patients, these patients had significant subcortical damage that involved insular cortex and adjacent white matter Dronkers also showed that a matched group of stroke patients without AOS did not have damage to this portion of insular cortex, thus confirming the specificity of the result. This work has been cited more than 1400 times in published articles (Google scholar, June 2021).

Her findings have been highly influential, and according to google scholar, have been cited in published work more than 21,000 times. Scientists studying speech and language across the world had used Broca's area for many decades as a biological marker of speech production and fluency in the brain. Dronkers defined a new area of the brain that is critical for language expression, and this region is sometimes now referred to as “Dronkers’ area”.

Dronkers’ work helped lead the way for more precise studies of brain regions associated with discrete speech and language functions. Her work emphasized the critical role that subcortical brain connections play in supporting language. She and her collaborators developed new methods to more precisely analyze stroke lesions in large groups of neurological patients with specific language deficits. With these analyses, each patient's brain scan is virtually cut into 1 millimeter cubes called voxels, with the patient's lesion either inside or outside each voxel. Then, patients’ behavioral performance (e.g., AOS, degree of expressive aphasia) is related to each of these discrete voxels in a statistical manner that allows for pinpointing of specific brain voxels associated with a particular aspect of language. This technique is known as voxel-based-lesion-symptom mapping or VLSM. It provided a new tool for examining relationships between discrete brain areas and selected deficits in language and cognition.

== Honors ==
- Twice elected chair, Society for the Neurobiology of Language (1997, 2014)
- Elected Chair, Academy of Aphasia (1997) 08)
