= Marc Dax =

French neurologist (1770–1837)

Marc Dax (27 December 1770 – 3 June 1837) was a French neurologist, sometimes credited for discovering the link between neurological damage to the left hemisphere, right-sided hemiplegia, and a loss of the ability to produce speech (aphasia). He submitted his discovery, based on the observations of three patients in Montpellier, to the French Academy of Sciences and two previous notes were published in 1836, 25 years before Paul Broca's more famous description. His papers were titled Observations tending to prove the constant coincidence of disturbances of speech with a lesion of the left hemisphere of the brain, and Lesions of the left half of the encephalon coincident with the forgetting of signs of thinking. He died one year later and thus his discovery remained obscure.

In 1863, Gustave Dax, the son of Marc Dax, published his father's work on the subject, two years after Paul Broca's presentation of the same phenomenon to Société d’Anthropologie (Broca's original French communication, plus link to English translation here http://psychclassics.yorku.ca/Broca/perte.htm). The publication included the 1836 memoir of Marc Dax, his deceased father, and additional clinical observations of his own on 140 patients. His contribution received a negative appraisal by the Academy, however, and Gustave Dax was overlooked by the scientific establishment of the time. In consequence, today the discovery of the link between the left hemisphere and speech is typically credited to Paul Broca.

According to authors Cubelli and Montagna, the Broca's theory should be renamed:

"Probably, Broca was aware of the paper prior to 1865, but he never acknowledged Dax's original theoretical contribution. On the contrary, he always claimed to be the first to espouse the theory of left hemisphere dominance for language and never quoted Marc Dax (Broca, 1877 p 536), I do not like dealing with the questions of priority concerning myself. That is the reason why I did not mention the name of Dax in my paper. In our opinion, the weight of evidence reported here suggests that the theory of the left hemisphere dominance for speech must be attributed equally to Dax and Broca, and henceforth should be called the theory of Dax-Broca."

The medical historians S. Finger, M. Crichtley and A. L. Benton were responsible for bringing to light the role and importance of the Daxes for neurolinguistics, in a number of papers. Citing Finger on Gustave Dax:

"Gustave Dax's own unique contribution, however, has been almost completely overlooked. Although his theory lacked specificity, he preceded Meynert, Schmidt, and Wernicke in suggesting that the left temporal lobe may be especially important for speech."

== Bibliography ==
- "M. Dax soumet au jugement de l'Académie un Mémoire intitulé: `Observations tendant à prouver la coïncidence constante des dérangements de la parole avec une lésion de l'hémisphère gauche du cerveau'." Compt.rend.hebdom.séan.l'Acad Scien, 1863, 56, 536.
- Dax, M. Lésions de la moitié gauche de l'encéphale coïncident avec l'oubli des signes de la pensée (lu à Montpellier en 1836). Bulletin hebdomadaire de médecine et de chirurgie, 2me série, 1865, 2, 259–62.
- Joynt, R.J.; Benton, A.L. The memoir of Marc Dax on aphasia. Neurology. 1964 Sep;14:851-4. PMID 14215601
- Critchley, M. La controverse de Dax et Broca. Revue neurologique, 1964, 110, 553-57 (English translation in Critchley, The Divine Banquet of the Brain and Other Essays, New York: Raven Press, 1979, pp. 72–82).
- Benton A. Hemispheric dominance before Broca. Neuropsychologia. 1984;22(6):807-11. PMID 6084827
- Roe D, Finger S. Gustave Dax and his fight for recognition: an overlooked chapter in the early history of cerebral dominance. J Hist Neurosci. 1996 Dec;5(3):228-40. PMID 11618743
- Finger S.; Roe D. Does Gustave Dax Deserve to Be Forgotten? The Temporal Lobe Theory and Other Contributions of an Overlooked Figure in the History of Language and Cerebral Dominance. Brain and Language, 1999; 69(1), 16–30. PMID 10452812
- Finger S, Roe D. Gustave Dax and the early history of cerebral dominance. Arch Neurol. 1996 Aug;53(8):806-13. PMID 8759988
- Cubelli R, Montagna CG. A reappraisal of the controversy of Dax and Broca. J Hist Neurosci. 1994 Oct;3(4):215-26. PMID 11618822
