= Louis Lorenz Stein =

American pharmacist (1902–1996)

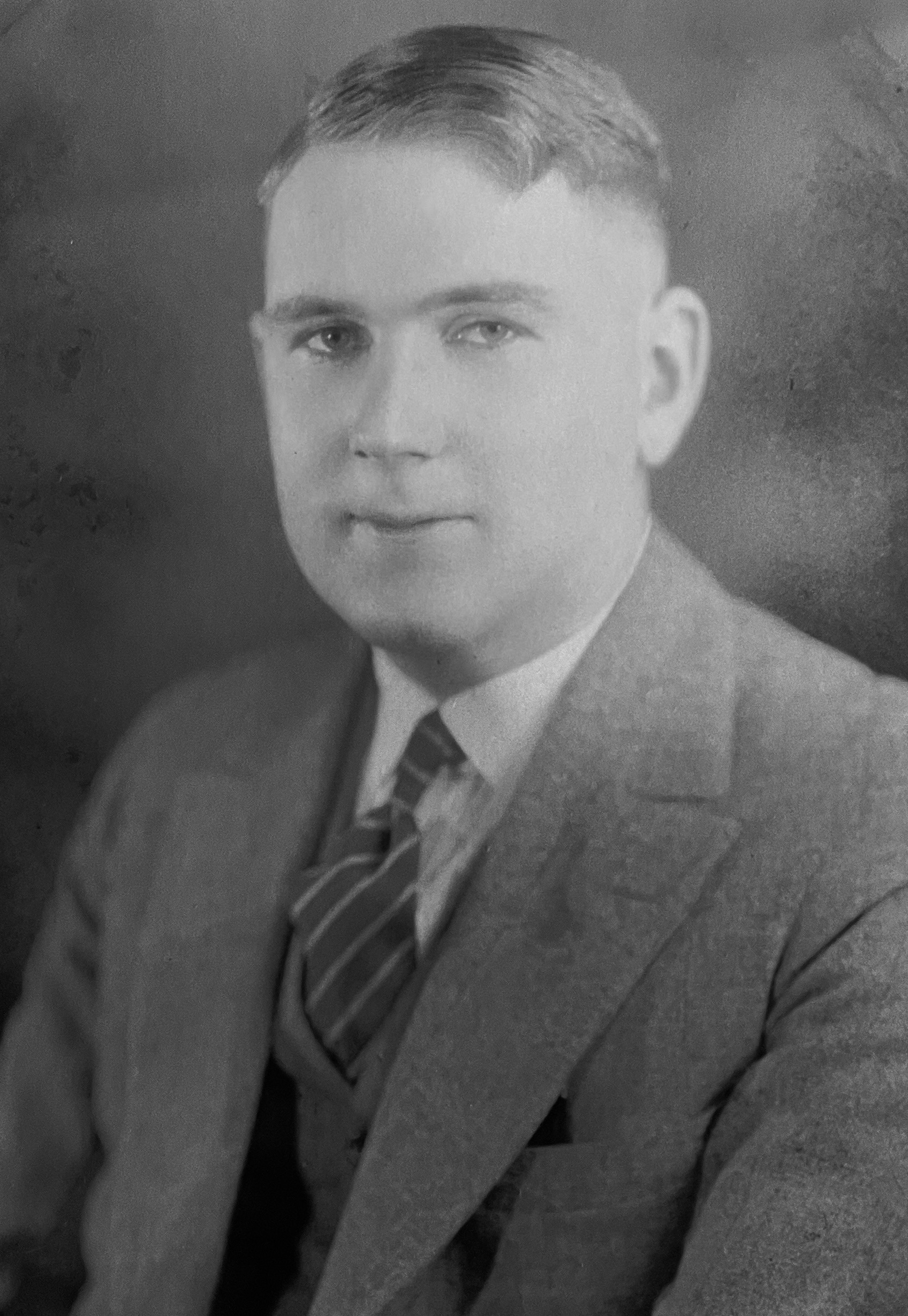
- Louis L. Stein, ca. 1927.
- Born: Louis Lorenz Stein Jr. August 21, 1902; Berkeley, California, US
- Died: November 11, 1996 (aged 94); Berkeley, California, US
- Education: University of California, Berkeley, University of California, San Francisco
- Occupations: Pharmacist, historian
- Spouse: Mildred "Milly" Slater
- Children: 2

Louis Lorenz Stein Jr. (August 21, 1902 – November 11 1996) was an American pharmacist and historian He is best known for founding the Arlington Pharmacy in Kensington, California and the pharmacy museum at Columbia State Historic Park and for donating collections of historical materials to various California historical societies and museums.

== Early life ==
Stein was born on August 21, 1902, in Berkeley, California, one of six children of German immigrant parents, Lorenz Louis Stein (1865-1953) and Dorthea Reismann (1873-1968). His father came to Berkeley in 1885 and opened up the first meat market at 1448 Shattuck Avenue, north of the old firehouse. His parents also had the Stein Ranch in Reliez Valley, California. As a child, Stein lived at 1423 Walnut Street in Berkeley and attended public schools including Berkeley High School, where he developed interests in sports and history. He attended the University of California, Berkeley and received a pharmacy degree in 1924 from the university's Affiliated College of Pharmacy. He married Mildred Slater on November 5, 1927, in Oakland, California, and they had two children.

== Career ==
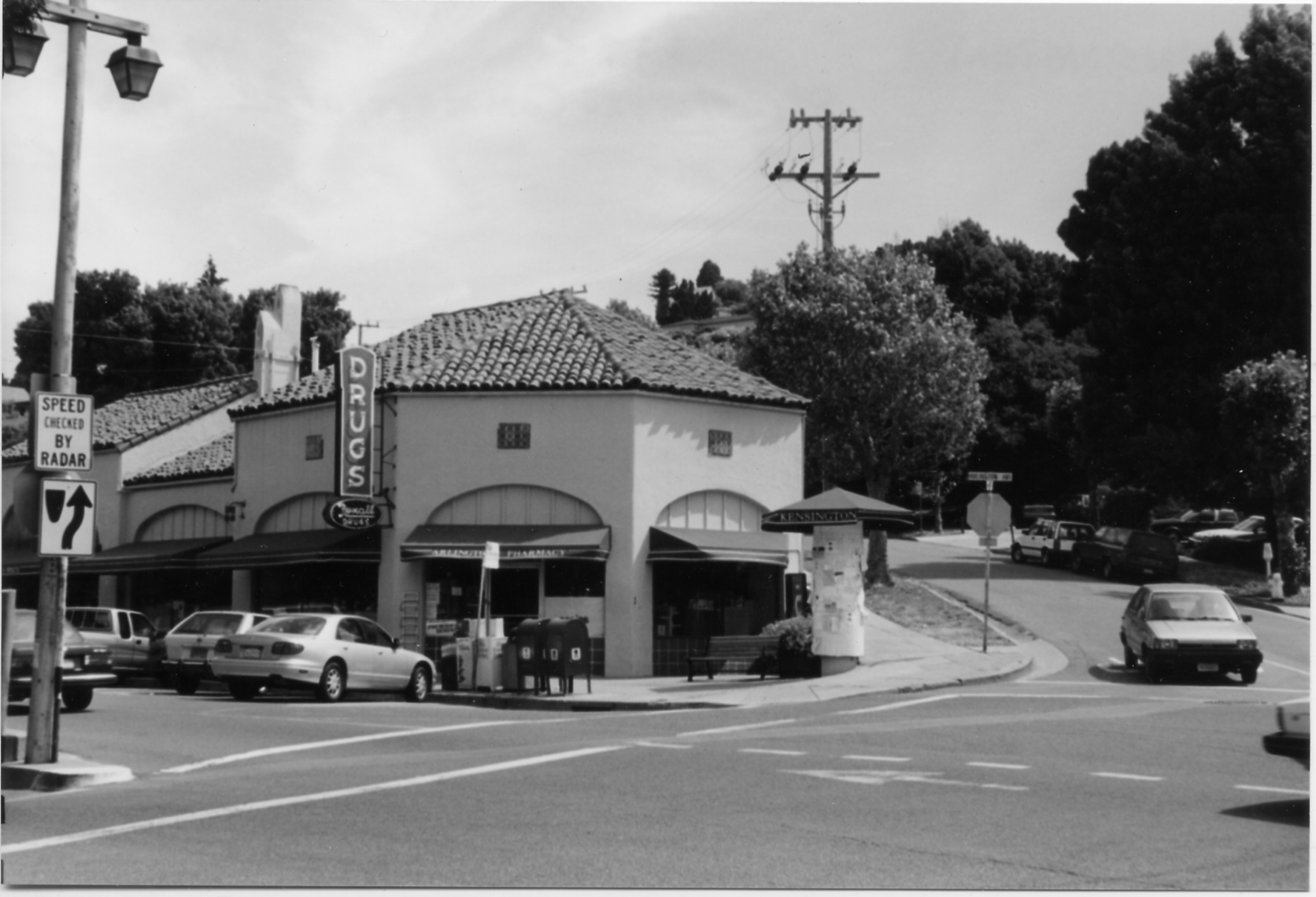
Arlington Pharmacy, ca. 1994.

In 1928, Stein established the Arlington Pharmacy at 299 Arlington Avenue, Kensington, California, in a new building designed by architect Edwin Lewis Snyder. (The building now houses a coffee and cheese market, but the "Drugs" sign remains.) He operated the pharmacy for 36 years until he retired in 1964. In its early days the pharmacy included a soda fountain, a U.S. Post Office and a lending library.

According to an article from The Times (San Mateo County), Stein advised Walt Disney on details for an authentic Main Street drug store at Disneyland.

Stein was president of the California Pharmaceutical Association in San Francisco in 1955-56. Under his leadership, the association created a pharmacy museum at Columbia State Historic Park. It depicts a California pharmacy of the late 19th century with authentic furnishings and pharmaceutical ground glass bottles. Stein's personal collection of historic pharmacy photographs and artifacts was exhibited at the Oakland Public Museum in 1962.

== Railroad collection ==
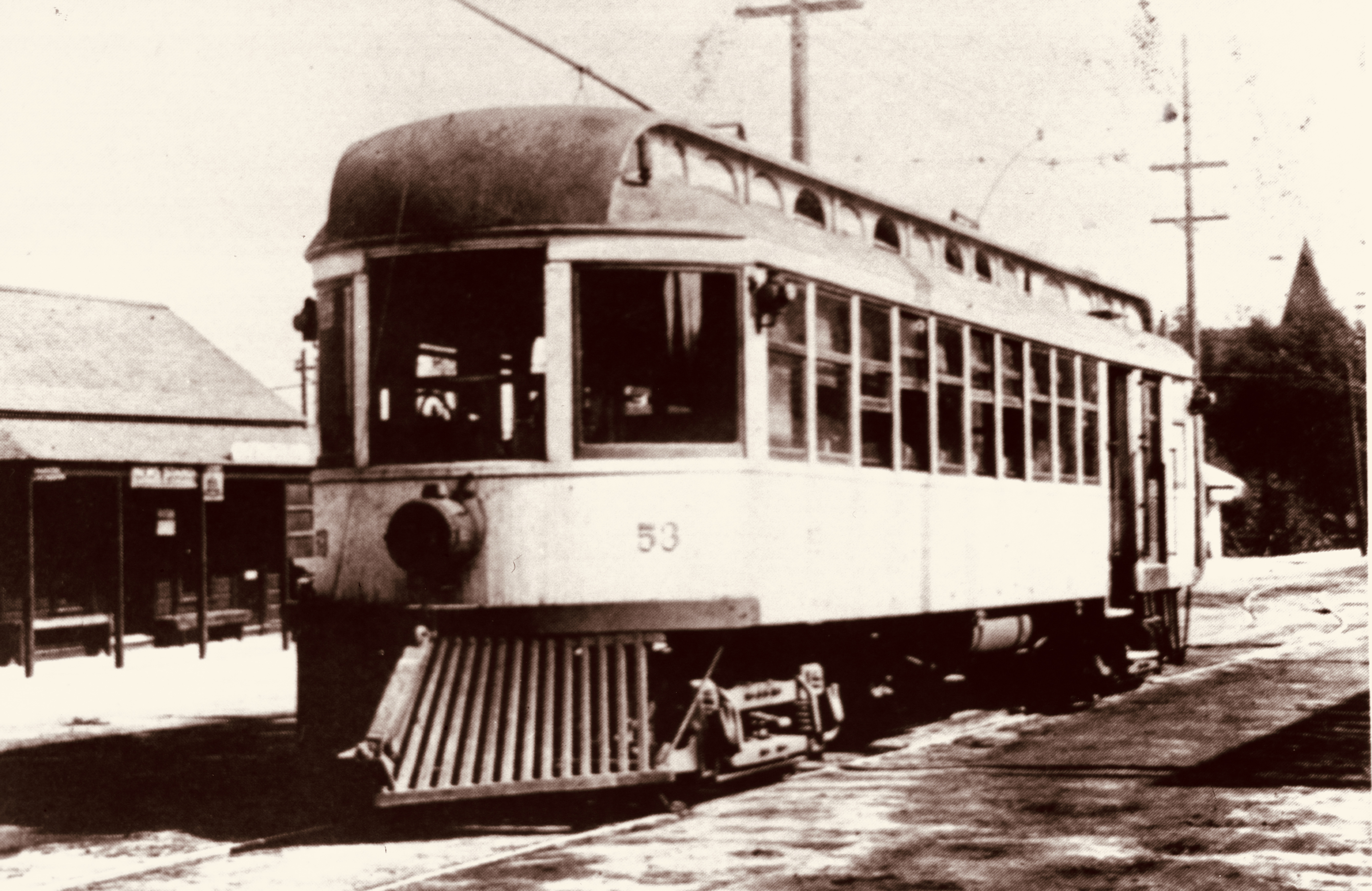
Petaluma & Santa Rosa 53 streetcar, from the collection of Louis L. Stein, Jr.

Stein started collecting railroadiana and soon had a vast railroad collection, which later went to the California State Railroad Museum in Old Sacramento State Historic Park. He supervised the repair and reconstruction in his backyard of one of the East Bay's oldest horse-drawn streetcars, which was in service between Temescal, Oakland and the University of California, Berkeley. The horsecar is now at the Western Railway Museum near Rio Vista, California. The Louis Lorenz Stein, Jr. collection at the California State Railroad Museum represents railroad related papers and documents from 1873 to 1879.

Photographs from the Louis L. Stein, Jr. Collection are part of the Railroad Museum's photograph collection. An example railroad photograph is the 1940s City of San Francisco passenger train.

In July 1971, at a luncheon attended by over 200 historians, the California Historical Society presented Director Louis Stein their top honor for an individual, the Award of Merit. The award was presented by former United States Senator from California, William F. Knowland.

== Community service ==
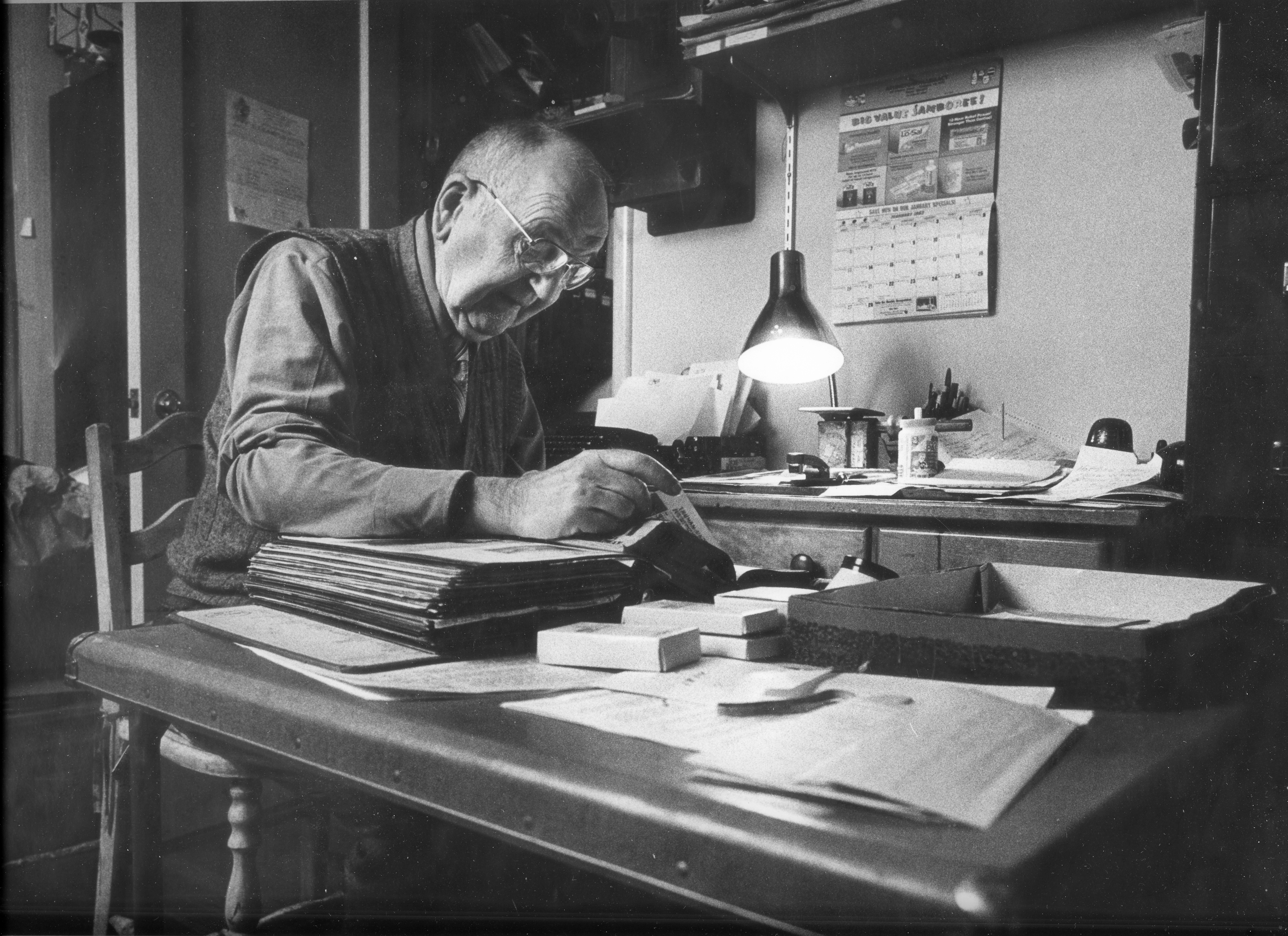
Louis Stein at work in the attic office of his home, photo courtesy of Contra Costa County Historical Society.

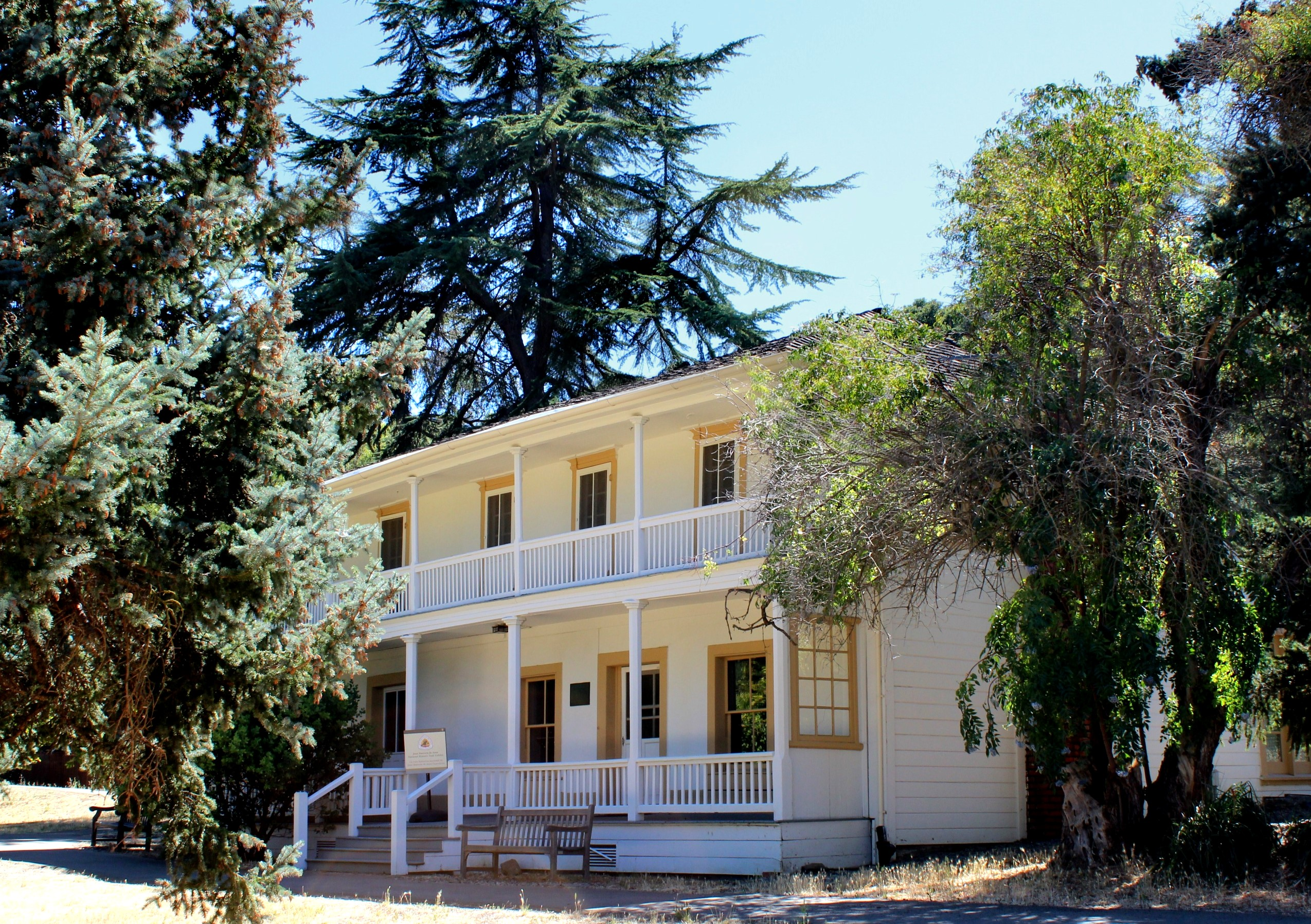
Vicente Martinez Adobe, bought by Stein in 1955 to save it from being razed; now part of the John Muir National Historic Site.

Stein and his wife were founding members of the Arlington Community Church, and he was appointed an Honorary Mayor of Kensington. He was an active leader in the Alameda County Historical Society, History Guild of the Oakland Museum of California, California Heritage Council, E Clampus Vitus, Railway and Locomotive Historical Society, UC Berkeley Bears Backers, US Olympic Committee, The Live Oak Athletic Club, and the Berkeley-Albany High 12 Club. Stein gave illustrated lectures before civic, fraternal, school, social, political and business groups.

Stein had a passion for history and collected letters, diaries, manuscripts, photographs, maps, newspapers and historical artifacts. He was one of the founders of the Contra Costa County Historical Society in 1950-51.

On February 9, 1955, he and his wife Mildred bought the Vicente Martinez Adobe, built in 1849, for $25,000 to save it from being razed and subdivided. It is now part of the John Muir National Historic Site.

In July 1978, Stein purchased in a county auction a historic 500-pound bell that hung in the tower at the Contra Costa County courthouse in Martinez, California, which was built in 1852. Stein donated the bell to be placed in the Borland House in Martinez, which was restored by the Martinez Historical Society to serve as a city museum.

In the early 1980s, Stein donated 80 boxes of his historical collections, dating from 1858 to 1920, relating to Contra Costa County, California, to the Contra Costa County Historical Society. The manuscripts, documents, maps, photographs, newspapers, and ephemera, about 50,000 items, are now in the History Center.

== Later life ==
On November 5, 1977, Louis and Mildred celebrated their Golden Anniversary at a reception in Piedmont, California. Over 150 relatives and friends attended the reception.

Stein died of natural causes on November 11, 1996, at Walnut Creek, California, at age 94. A memorial service was held at the Arlington Community Church in Kensington with interment at the Sunset View Cemetery in El Cerrito, California. His wife, Mildred Slater Stein, died on May 20, 1989 in Berkeley at the age of 86.

== See also ==
- List of pharmacists
- List of historians
