= Paul Broca =

French physician, anatomist and anthropologist (1824–1880)

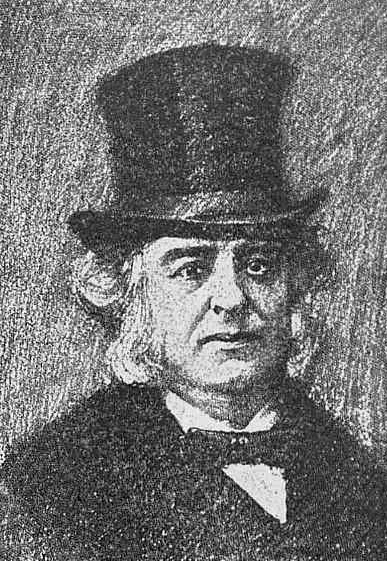
- Paul Pierre Broca
- Born: 28 June 1824; Sainte-Foy-la-Grande, Gironde, France
- Died: 9 July 1880 (aged 56); Paris, France
- Known for: Broca's area Broca's aphasia Diagonal band of Broca
- Scientific career
- Fields: Anthropology; Anatomy; Medicine

Paul Pierre Broca (/ˈbroʊkə/, also UK: /ˈbrɒkə/, US: /ˈbroʊkɑː/, French: [pɔl bʁɔka]; 28 June 1824 – 9 July 1880) was a French physician, anatomist and anthropologist. He is best known for his research on Broca's area, a region of the frontal lobe that is named after him. Broca's area is involved with language. His work revealed that the brains of patients with aphasia contained lesions in a particular part of the cortex, in the left frontal region. This was the first anatomical proof of localization of brain function.

Broca's work contributed to the development of physical anthropology, advancing the science of anthropometry, and craniometry, in particular, the now-discredited practice of determining intelligence. He was engaged in comparative anatomy of primates and humans and proposed that Negroes were an intermediate form between apes and Europeans. He saw each racial group as its own species and believed racial mixing eventually led to sterility.

== Biography ==
Paul Broca was born on 28 June 1824 in Sainte-Foy-la-Grande, Gironde, France, the son of Jean Pierre "Benjamin" Broca, a medical practitioner and former surgeon in Napoleon's service, and Annette Thomas, well-educated daughter of a Calvinist, Reformed Protestant, preacher. Huguenot Broca received basic education in the school in his hometown, earning a bachelor's degree at the age of 16. He entered medical school in Paris when he was 17, and graduated at 20, when most of his contemporaries were just beginning as medical students.

After graduating, Broca undertook an extensive internship, first with the urologist and dermatologist Philippe Ricord (1800–1889) at the Hôpital du Midi, then in 1844 with the psychiatrist François Leuret (1797–1851) at the Bicêtre Hospital. In 1845, he became an intern with Pierre Nicolas Gerdy (1797–1856), a great anatomist and surgeon. After two years with Gerdy, Broca became his assistant. In 1848, Broca became the Prosector, performing dissections for lectures of anatomy, at the University of Paris Medical School. In 1849, he was awarded a medical doctorate. In 1853, Broca became professor agrégé, and was appointed surgeon of the hospital. He was elected to the chair of external pathology at the Faculty of Medicine in 1867, and one year later professor of clinical surgery. In 1868, he was elected a member of the Académie de medicine, and appointed the chair of clinical surgery. He served in this capacity until his death. He also worked for the Hôpital St. Antoine, the Pitié, the Hôtel des Clinques, and the Hôpital Necker.

As a researcher, Broca joined the Société anatomique de Paris in 1847. During his first six years in the society, Broca was its most productive contributor. Two months after joining, he was on the society's journal editorial committee. He became its secretary and then vice president by 1851. Soon after its creation in 1848, Broca joined the Société de Biologie. He also joined and in 1865 became the president of the Societe de Chirurgie (Surgery).

In parallel with his medical career, Broca founded in 1848 a society of free-thinkers, sympathetic to Charles Darwin's theories. He once remarked, "I would rather be a transformed ape than a degenerate son of Adam". This brought him into conflict with the church, which regarded him as a subversive materialist and a corrupter of the youth. The church's animosity toward him continued throughout his lifetime, resulting in numerous confrontations between Broca and the ecclesiastical authorities.

In 1857, feeling pressured by others and especially his mother, Broca married Adele Augustine Lugol. She came from a Protestant family and was the daughter of prominent physician Jean Guillaume Auguste Lugol. The Brocas had three children: daughter Jeanne Francoise Pauline (1858–1935), son Benjamin Auguste (1859–1924), and son Élie André (1863–1925). One year later, Broca's mother died and his father, Benjamin, came to Paris to live with the family until his death in 1877.

In 1858, Broca was elected as member of the German Academy of Sciences Leopoldina. In 1859, he founded the Society of Anthropology of Paris. In 1872, he founded the journal Revue d'anthropologie, and in 1876, the Institute of Anthropology. The French Church opposed the development of anthropology, and in 1876 organized a campaign to stop the teaching of the subject in the Anthropological Institute. In 1872, Broca was elected as a member to the American Philosophical Society.

Near the end of his life, Broca was elected a senator for life, a permanent position in the French senate. He was also a member of the Académie française and held honorary degrees from many learned institutions both in France and abroad. He died of a brain hemorrhage on 9 July 1880, at the age of 56. During his life he was an atheist and identified as a Liberal. His wife died in 1914 when she was 79. Like their father, Auguste and Andre went on to study medicine. Auguste Broca became a professor of pediatric surgery, now known for his contribution to the Broca-Perthes-Blankart operation, while André became a professor of medical optics and is known for developing the Pellin-Broca prism.

== Early work ==
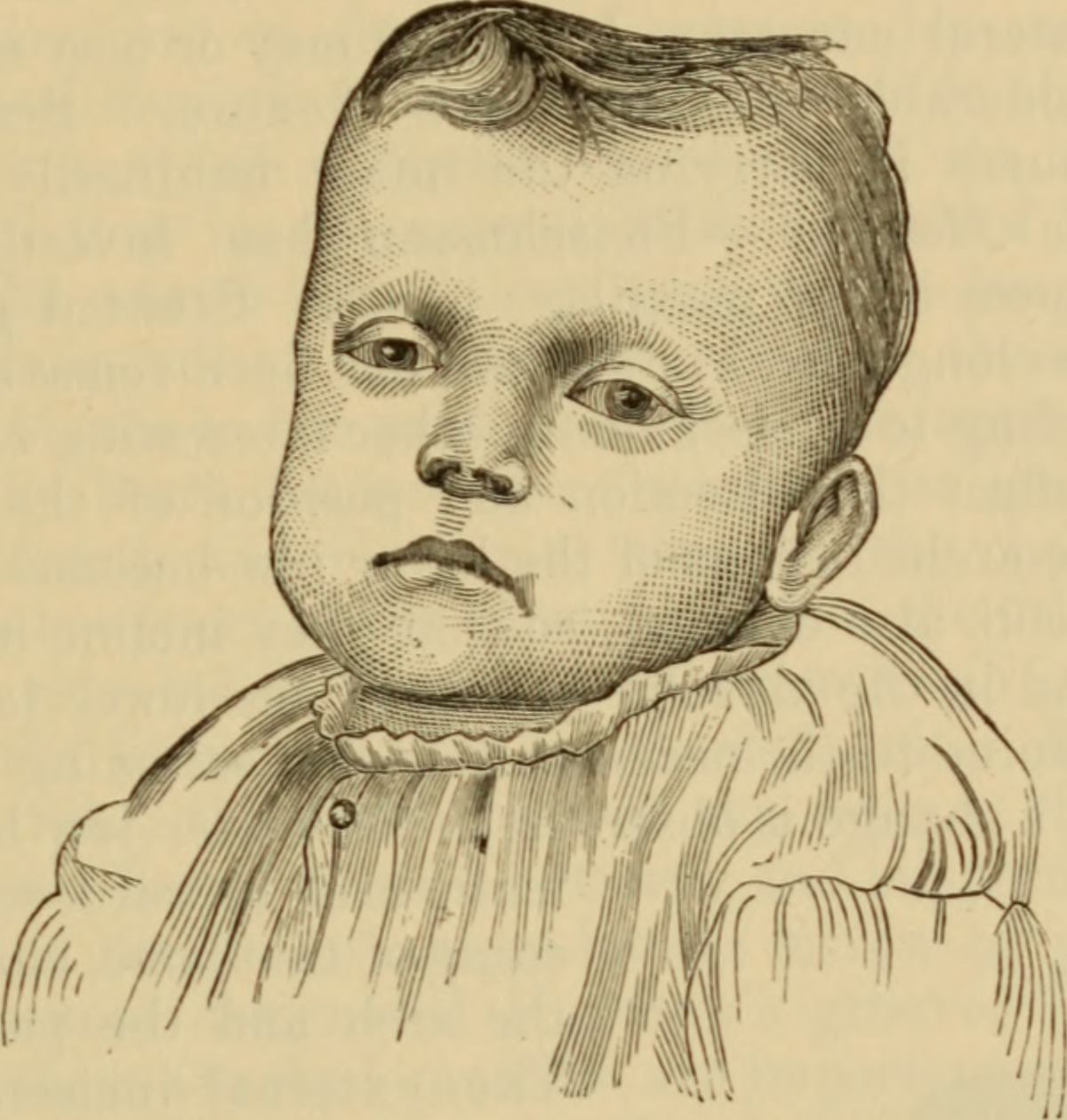
Head of a rachitic child in the New York Infant Asylum (1895)

Since the 1600s, the majority of medical advancements emerged through interaction in independent and sometimes secret societies. The Society Anatomique de Paris met every Friday and was chaired by anatomist Jean Cruveilhier, and interned by "the Father of French neurology" Jean-Martin Charcot; both of whom were instrumental in the later discovery of multiple sclerosis. At its meetings, members would make presentations regarding their scientific findings, which would then be published in the regular bulletin of the society's activities.

Like Cruveilhier and Charcot, Broca made regular Society Anatomique presentations on musculoskeletal disorders. He demonstrated that rickets, a disorder that results in weak or soft bones in children, was caused by an interference with ossification due to disruption of nutrition. In their work on osteoarthritis, a form of arthritis, Broca and Amédée Deville, Broca showed that, like nails and teeth, cartilage is a tissue that requires absorption of nutrients from nearby blood vessels, and described in detail, the process that lead to degeneration of cartilage in joints. (Note: Broca's finding that cartilage was a living tissue requiring nutrition, was also independently made by Peter Redfern at University and King's College, Aberdeen. Redfern, Peter (1850). Normal Nutrition in Human Articular Cartilages, with Experimental Researches on the Lower Animals. Sutherland and Knox.) Broca also made regular presentations on the clubfoot disorder, a birth defect where infants feet are rotated inwards at birth. At the time Broca saw degeneration of muscle tissue as an explanation for this condition, and while the root cause of it is still undetermined, Broca's theory of the muscle degeneration would lead to understanding the pathology of muscular dystrophy. As an anatomist, Broca can be considered as making 250 separate contributions to medical science. (Note: His contributions and discoveries included: "a third pair of suspensory at the back of the tongue, ... that the splenic pulp ... is composed of ... nucleated cells ... some new and correct opinions on the structure of the liver, the arcades of arteries supplying the gums." Schiller, 1979, p. 97)

As a surgeon, Broca wrote a detailed review on recently discovered use of chloroform as anesthesia, as well as on his own experiences of using novel pain managing methods during surgery, such as hypnosis and carbon dioxide as a local anesthetics. Broca used hypnosis during surgical removal of an abscess and received mixed results, as the patient felt pain at the beginning which then went away, and she could not remember anything afterwards. Because, of inconsistent results reported by other doctors, Broca did not repeat in using hypnosis as an anesthetic. (Note: Broca's studies on hypnotism were performed in association with other physicians that were studying it: Étienne Eugène Azam, Charles-Pierre Denonvilliers, François Anthime Eugène Follin, and Alfred-Armand-Louis-Marie Velpeau, Broca performed the first experiments in Europe using hypnotism as surgical anesthesia.) Because of his patient's memory loss, he saw the most potential in using it as a psychological tool. In 1856, Broca published On Aneurysms and their Treatment, a detailed, almost a thousand page long review of all accessible records on diagnosis and surgical and non treatment for these weakened blood vessels conditions. This book was one of the first published monograms on a specific subject. Before his later achievements, it was this work, that Broca was known for by other French doctors.

In 1857, Broca contributed to Charles-Édouard Brown-Séquard's work on the nervous system, conducting vivisection experiments, where specific spinal nerves were cut to demonstrate the spinal pathways for sensory and motor systems. As a result of this work. Brown-Séquard became known for demonstrating the principle of decussation, where a vertebrate's neural fibers cross from one lateral side to another, resulting in phenomenon of the right side of that animals brain controlling the left side of the other.

As a scientist, Broca also developed theories and made hypotheses that would eventually be disproven. Based on reported findings, for example, he published work in support of viewing syphilis as a virus. When western medicine discovered the qualities of the muscle relaxant curare, used by South American Indian hunters as poison, Broca thought there was strong support for the incorrect idea that, aside from being applied topically, curare could also be diluted and ingested to counter tetanus that caused muscle spasms.

Broca also spent many of his earlier years researching cancer. His wife had a known family history of carcinoma, and it is possible that this piqued his interest in exploring possible hereditary causes of cancer. In his investigations, he accumulated evidence supporting the hereditary nature of some cancers while also discovering that cancer cells can run through the blood. Many scientists were skeptical of Broca's hereditary hypothesis, with most believing that it is merely coincidental. He stated two hypotheses for the cause of cancer, diathesis and infection. He believed that the cause may lie somewhere between the two. He then hypothesized that (1) diathesis produces the first cancer (2) cancer produces infection, and (3) infection produces secondary multiple tumors, cachexia, and death."

== Anthropology ==
Broca spent much time at his Anthropological Institute studying skulls and bones. It has been argued that he was attempting to use the measurements obtained by these studies as his main criteria for ranking racial groups in order of superiority. In that sense, Broca was a pioneer in the study of physical anthropology a part of which has been called 'scientific racism.' He advanced the science of cranial anthropometry by developing many new types of measuring instruments (craniometers) and numerical indices. He published around 223 papers on general anthropology, physical anthropology, ethnology, and other branches of this field. He founded the Société d'Anthropologie de Paris in 1859, the Revue d'Anthropologie in 1872,

Broca first became acquainted with anthropology through the works of Isidore Geoffroy Saint-Hilaire, Antoine Étienne Reynaud Augustin Serres and Jean Louis Armand de Quatrefages de Bréau, and by the late 1850s it became his lifetime interest. Broca defined Anthropology as "the study of the human group, considered as whole." Like other scientists, he rejected relying on religious texts, and looked for a scientific explanation of human origins.

In 1857, Broca was presented with a hybrid leporid, a result of a cross species reproduction between a rabbit and hare. The crossbreeding was done for commercial rather than scientific reasons, as the resulting hybrids became very popular pets. Specific circumstances had to be set up in order for differently behaving species to reproduce and for their hybrid descendants to be able to reproduce between themselves. To Broca, the fact that different animals are able to intermix and create fertile offspring did not prove that they were of the same species.

In 1858, Broca presented these findings on leporids to the Société de Biologie. He believed that the key element of his work was its implication that physical differences between human races could be explained by them being different species with different origins rather than the single moment of creation. While Charles Darwin's On the Origin of Species did not come out until the following year, the topic of human origin was already widely discussed in science, but still capable of producing a negative response from the government. Because of that worry, Pierre Rayer the president of the Société, along with other members with which Broca was on good relations, asked Broca to stop further discussion of the topic. Broca agreed, but was adamant for the discussion to continue, so in 1859 he formed the Société d'Anthropologie.

=== Racial groups and human species ===
As a proponent of polygenism, Broca rejected the monogenistic approach that all humans have a common ancestor. Instead he viewed human racial groups as coming from different origins. Like most of the proponents on either side, he viewed each racial group as having a place on a 'barbarism' to 'civilization' progression. He saw European colonization of other territories as justified by its being an attempt to civilize the barbaric populations. (Note: Broca took into consideration works by multiple authors such as Arthur de Gobineau, Robert Knox, Georges Pouchet, Samuel George Morton and Herbert Spencer. Broca, 1964.) In his 1859 work On the Phenomenon of Hybridity in the Genus Homo, he argued that it was reasonable to view humanity as composed of independent racial groups – such as Australian, Caucasian, Mongolian, Malayan, Ethiopian, and American. He saw each racial group as its own species, connected to a geographic location. All together, these different species were part of the single genus homo. Per the standard of the time, Broca would also refer to the Caucasian racial group as white, and to the Ethiopian racial group as Negro. In his writings, Broca's use of the word race was narrower than how it is used today. Broca considered Celts, Gauls, Greeks, Persians and Arabs to be distinct races that were part of the Caucasian racial group. (Note: Broca justified using geographic locations rather than skin color when classifying racial groups: "It has been shown that the American type alone includes red, brown, black, white and yellow races. There are brown races in the American, and even in the Caucasian type. All the black races do not belong to the Ethiopian type; and finally, the Malayo-Polynesian type comprises races of colours as various as those belonging to the American type. A classification founded on differences of colour would lead to numerous and serious errors." Broca, 1864, p. 9) Races within each group had specific physical characteristics that distinguished them from other racial groups. Like his work in anatomy, Broca emphasized that his conclusions rested on empirical evidence, rather than a priori reasoning. He thought that the distinct geographic location of each racial group was one of the main problems with the monogenists argument for common ancestry:

There was even, no necessity to insist upon the difficulty, or greater geographical impossibility of the dispersion of so many races proceeding from a common origin, nor to remark that before the remote and the almost recent migrations of Europeans, each natural group of human races occupied upon our planet a region characterized by a special fauna; that no American animal was found either in Australia nor in the ancient continent, and where men of a new type were discovered, there were only found animals belonging to species, then to general, and sometimes to zoological orders, without analogues in other regions of the globe.

Broca also felt that there was not enough evidence for the theory that appearance of different races could be changed by the qualities of the environments that they lived in. Broca saw the physical characteristic of Jews being the same as those portrayed in the Egyptian paintings from the 2,500 B.C., even though, by 1850 A.D. that population had spread to different locations with vastly different environments. He pointed out that his opponents were unable to provide similar long-term comparisons.

==== Hybridity ====
Broca, influenced by previous work of Samuel George Morton, used the concept of hybridity as his primary argument against monogenism, and that it was flawed to see all of humanity as a single species. Different racial groups' ability to reproduce with each was not sufficient to prove that idea. Under Broca's view on hybridity, the result of a reproduction between two different races could fall into four categories: 1) The resulting offspring are infertile; 2) Where the resulting offspring are infertile when they reproduce between themselves but are sometimes successful when they reproduce with the parent groups; 3) Known as paragenesic, where the offspring's descendants are able reproduce within themselves and with parents, but the success of the reproduction lowers with every generation until it ends; and 4) Known as eugenesic, where a successful reproduction can continue indefinitely, between the intermix descendants and with the parent group.

Looking at historical population figures, Broca concluded that the population of France was an example of a eugenesic mixed race, resulting from intermixing of Cimbri, Celtic, Germanic and Northern races within the Caucasian group. On the other hand, the thought that observations and population data from different regions of Africa, Southeast Asia, and North and South America, showed a significant decrease in physical and intellectual abilities of mixed groups when compared to the different races that they originated from. Concluding that intermixed descendants of different racial groups could only be Paragenesic.

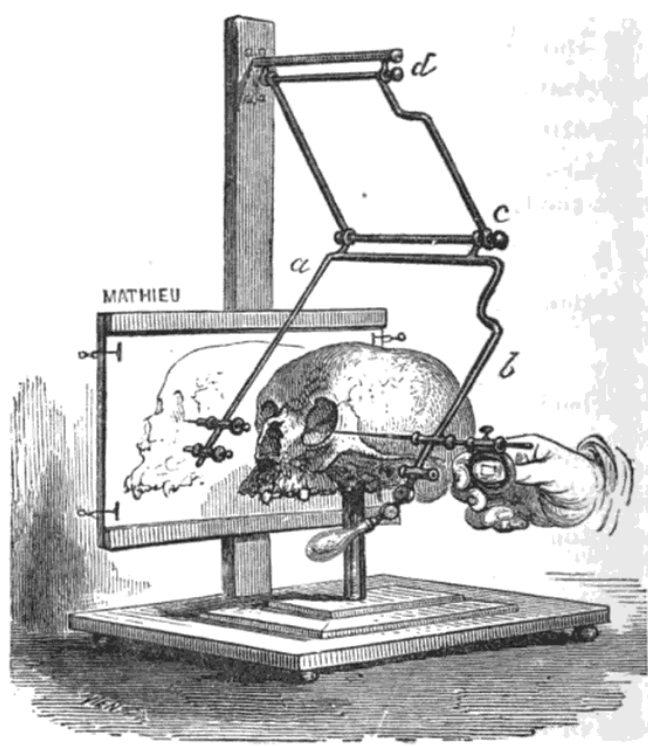
Stereograph designed by Paul Broca and manufactured by Mathieu

I am far from advancing these suppositions as demonstrated truths. I have studied and analysed all documents within my reach; but I cannot be responsible for facts not ascertained by myself, and which are too much in opposition to generally received opinions to be admitted without strict investigation... Until we obtain further particulars we can only reason upon the known facts; but these, it must be admitted, are so numerous and so authentic as to constitute if not a rigorous definitive demonstration, at least a strong presumption of the doctrines of polygenists.

On the Phenomenon of Hybridity was published the same year as Darwin's presentation of the theory of evolution in the On the Origin of Species. At that time, Broca thought of each racial group was independently created by nature. He was against slavery and disturbed by extinction of native populations caused by colonization. Broca thought that monogenism was often used to justify such actions, when it was argued that, if all races were of a single origin then "the lower status of non-Caucasians" was caused by how their race acted following creation. He wrote:

The difference of origin by no means implicates the subordination of races. It, on the contrary, implicates the idea that each race of men has originated in a determined region, as it were, as the crown of the fauna of that region; and if it were permitted to guess at the intention of nature, we might be led to suppose that she has assigned a distinct inheritance to each race, because, despite all that has been said of the cosmopolitism of man, the inviolability of the domain of certain races is determined by their climate.

==== Craniometry ====
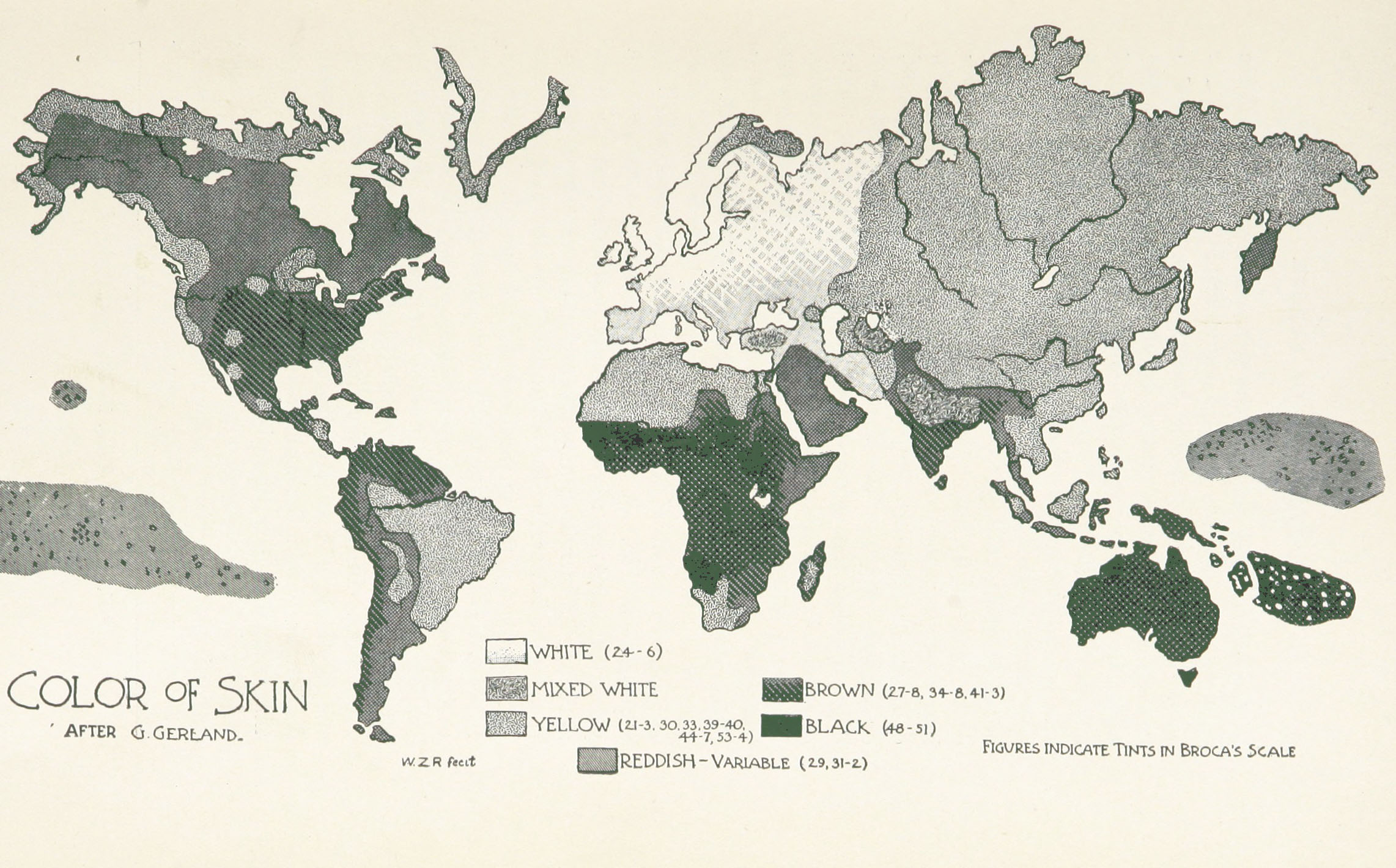
Map of Color of Skin: Figures indicate tint in Broca's scale

Broca is known for making contributions towards anthropometry—the scientific approach to measurements of human physical features. He developed numerous instruments and data points that were the basis of current methods of medical and archeological craniometry. Specifically, cranial points like glabella and inion and instruments like craniograph and stereograph. Unlike Morton, who believed that a subject's brain size was the main indicator of intelligence, Broca thought that there were other factors that were more important. These included prognathic facial angles, with closer to right angles indicating higher intelligence, and the cephalic index relationship between the brain's length and width, that was directly proportional with intelligence, with the most intelligent European group being 'long headed', while the least intelligent Negro group being 'short headed'. He thought that the most important aspect, was the relative size between the frontal and rear areas of the brain, with Caucasians having a larger frontal area than Negroes. Broca eventually came to the conclusion that larger skulls were not associated with higher intelligence, but still believed brain size was important in some aspects such as social progress, material security, and education. (Note: As of 2016, several meta-studies have shown, that in humans, there is a weak correlation between brain size and general intelligence, with results ranging from 9 to 15 percent.) He compared cranial capacity of different types of Parisian skulls. In doing so he found that the average oldest Parisian skull was smaller than a modern, wealthier Parisian skull and that both were bigger than the average skull from a poor Parisian's grave. (Note: In that study, Broca's primary purpose was to compare brain sizes and shapes of Basque and French populations, and participated in digging up 60 skulls from Basque graves while vacationing in Pyrenees.) Aside from his approaches to craniometry, Broca made other contributions to anthropometry, such as developing field work scales and measuring techniques for classifying eye, skin, and hair color, designed to resist water and sunlight damage.

=== Evolution ===
In 1861 Broca published On the Phenomenon of Hybridity two years after Darwin's On the Origin of Species was published. Broca accepted evolution as one of the main elements of a broader explanation for diversification of species: "I am one of those who do not think that Charles Darwin has discovered the true agents of organic evolution; on the other hand I am not one of those who fail to recognize the greatness of his work ... Vital competition ... is a law; the resultant selection is a fact; individual variation, another fact."

He came to reject polygenism as applied to humans, conceding that all races were of single origin. In 1866, after the discovery of a chinless and protruded Neanderthal jaw, he wrote: "I have already had occasion to state that I am not a Darwinist ... Yet I do not hesitate ... to call this the first link in the chain which, according to the Darwinists, extends from man to ape..." He saw some differences between groups of animals as too distinct to be explained through evolution from a single source:

There is no reason for limiting to a single spot and single moment the spontaneous evolution of matter ... To me it seems most likely that centers of organization appeared in very different places and at very different periods ... This polygenic transformism is what I would be inclined to accept ... My objection against Darwinism would be invalid if it conceded that organized beings have an undetermined but considerable number of distinct origins and if structural analogies were no longer considered sufficient proof for common parentage.

Even on a narrower level Broca saw evolution as insufficient explanation for the presence of some traits:

Apply Darwin's thinking to the genus Orang (Satyrus) ... He alone, of all the primates, has no nail on his big toe. Why? ... The Darwinists will answer that one day a certain Pithecus was born without a big toe nail, and his descendants have perpetuated this variety ... Let us call this ape ... Prosatyrus I, as it behooves the founder of a dynasty ... While, according to the law of immediate heredity, some of his offspring were like their other ancestors in having a nail on every toe, one or more were deprived of the first nail like their father ... Thanks to natural selection, this character finally became constant ... But I do not see ... how this negative characteristic ... might give him advantage in the struggle for existence.

Ultimately, Broca believed that there had to be a process that ran parallel to evolution, to fully explain the origins of, and divergences, between different species.

== Language ==
=== Broca's area ===
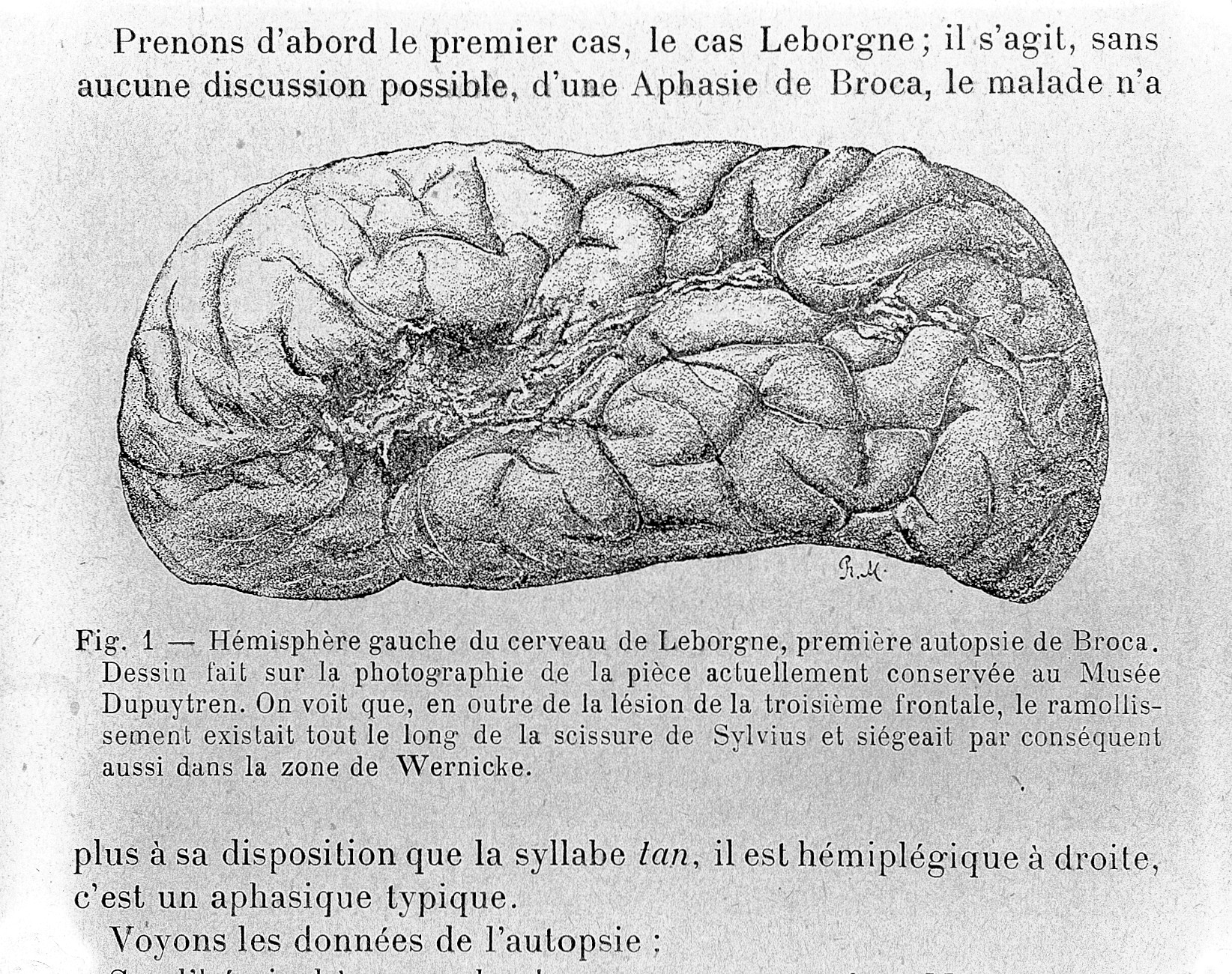
Louis Victor "Tan" Lebourgne's brain (by Pierre Marie)

Broca is most well known for his theory that the speech production center of the brain is located on the left side of the brain, and for pinpointing the location to the ventroposterior region of the frontal lobes (now known as Broca's area). He arrived at this discovery by studying the brains of aphasic patients –persons with speech and language disorders resulting from brain injuries.

This area of study began for Broca with the dispute between the proponents of cerebral localization – whose views derived from the phrenology of Franz Joseph Gall – and their opponents led by Pierre Flourens. Phrenologists believed that the human mind has a set of various mental faculties, each one represented in a different area of the brain. In this framework, specific areas may represent personality characteristics like one's aggressiveness or spirituality, or functions like memory and linguistic abilities. Their opponents claimed that Flourens had disproven Gall's hypotheses through careful ablation – specific and deliberate removal – of brain regions. However, Gall's former student, Jean-Baptiste Bouillaud, kept the localization of function hypothesis alive (especially with regards to a "language center"), although he rejected much of the remaining phrenological thinking. In 1848, Bouillaud relied on his work with patients with brain damage to challenge other professionals to disprove him by finding a case of frontal lobe damage unaccompanied by a disorder of speech. His son-in-law, Ernest Aubertin (1825–1893), began seeking out cases to either support or disprove the theory, and he found several in support of it.

Broca's Society of Anthropology of Paris was a place where language was regularly discussed in the context of race and nationality, and it also became a platform for addressing its physiological aspects. The localization of function controversy became a topic of regular debate when several experts of head and brain anatomy, including Aubertin, joined the society. Most of these experts still supported Flourens' argument, but Aubertin was persistent in presenting new patients to counter their views. However, it was Broca, not Aubertin, who finally put the localization issue to rest.

In 1861, Broca visited a patient in the Bicêtre Hospital named Louis Victor Leborgne, who had a 21-year progressive loss of speech and paralysis but not a loss of comprehension nor mental function. He was nicknamed "Tan" due to his inability to clearly speak any words other than "tan" (pronounced /tɑ̃/, as in the French word temps, "time"). Leborgne died several days later due to an uncontrolled infection and resultant gangrene, Broca performed an autopsy, hoping to find a physical explanation for Leborgne's disability. He determined that, as predicted, Leborgne did in fact have a lesion in the frontal lobe in one of the cerebral hemispheres, which in this case turned out to be the left. From a comparative progression of Leborgne's loss of speech and motor movement, the area of the brain important for speech production was determined to lie within the third convolution of the left frontal lobe, next to the lateral sulcus. One day after Tan's death Broca presented his findings to the anthropological society.

A second case after Leborgne is what solidified Broca's beliefs that human speech function was localized. Lazare Lelong was an 84-year-old grounds worker who was being treated at Bicêtre for dementia. He had also lost the ability to speak other than five simple, meaningful words – these included his own name, "yes", "no", "always" as well as the number "three". After his death his brain was also autopsied. Broca found a lesion that encompassed much the same area as had been affected in Leborgne's brain. This finding concluded that a specific area controlled one's ability to produce meaningful sounds, and when it is affected, one can lose their capability to communicate. For the next two years, Broca went on to find autopsy evidence from twelve more cases in support of the localization of articulated language.

Broca's area

Broca published his findings from the autopsies of the twelve patients in his paper "Localization of Speech in the Third Left Frontal Convolution" in 1865. His work inspired others to perform careful autopsies with the aim of linking more brain regions to sensory and motor functions. Although history credits this discovery to Broca, another French neurologist, Marc Dax, had made similar observations a generation earlier. Based on his work with approximately forty patients and subjects from other papers, Dax presented his findings at an 1836 conference of southern France physicians in Montpellier. (Note: In his paper "Lesions of the Left Half of the Brain Coincident with the Forgetting of the Signs of Thought", Dax described patients with tumors, strokes as well as sword wounds; no autopsy information was included. Finger, 200, p. 146) Dax died soon after this presentation and it was not reported or published until after Broca made his initial findings. Accordingly, Dax's and Broca's conclusions that the left frontal lobe is essential for producing language are considered to be independent.

However, the brains of Leborgne and Lelong had been preserved whole; Broca had never sliced them to reveal the other damaged structures beneath. Over 100 years later Nina Dronkers, an American cognitive neuroscientist, obtained permission to re-examine these brains using modern MRI technology. This imaging resulted in virtual slices of the historic brains and revealed that these patients had sustained much more damage to the brain than Broca could have known from just studying the outer surface. Their lesions extended to deeper layers beyond the left frontal lobe, including portions of insular cortex and critical white matter pathways below the cortex. This work was published in a peer-reviewed article, and has been cited.

The brains of many of Broca's aphasic patients are still preserved and available for viewing on a limited basis in the special collections of the Pierre-and-Marie-Curie University (UPMC) in Paris. The collection was formerly displayed in the Musée Dupuytren. His collection of casts is in the Musée d'Anatomie Delmas-Orfila-Rouvière. Broca presented his study on Leborgne in 1861 in the Bulletin of the Société Anatomique.

Patients with damage to Broca's area or to neighboring regions of the left inferior frontal lobe are often categorized clinically as having Expressive aphasia (also known as Broca's aphasia). This type of aphasia, which often involves impairments in speech output, can be contrasted with receptive aphasia, (also known as Wernicke's aphasia), named for Karl Wernicke, which is characterized by damage to more posterior regions of the left temporal lobe, and is often characterized by impairments in language comprehension.

== Criticism ==
=== Darwin ===
In 1868, Charles Darwin erroneously criticized Broca for believing in the existence of a tailless mutant of the Ceylon junglefowl, described in 1807 by the Dutch aristocrat, zoologist and museum director Coenraad Jacob Temminck.

=== Stephen Jay Gould ===
Broca was one of the first anthropologists engaged in comparative anatomy of primates and humans. Comparing then-dominant craniometry-based measures of intelligence, as well as other factors such as relative forearm-to-arm length, he proposed that Negroes were an intermediate form between apes and Europeans. The evolutionary biologist Stephen Jay Gould criticized Broca and his contemporaries of being engaged in "scientific racism" when conducting their research. Basing their work on biological determinism, and "a priori expectations" that "social and economic differences between human groups—primarily races, classes, and sexes—arise from inherited, inborn distinctions and that society, in this sense, is an accurate reflection of biology."

== Legacy ==
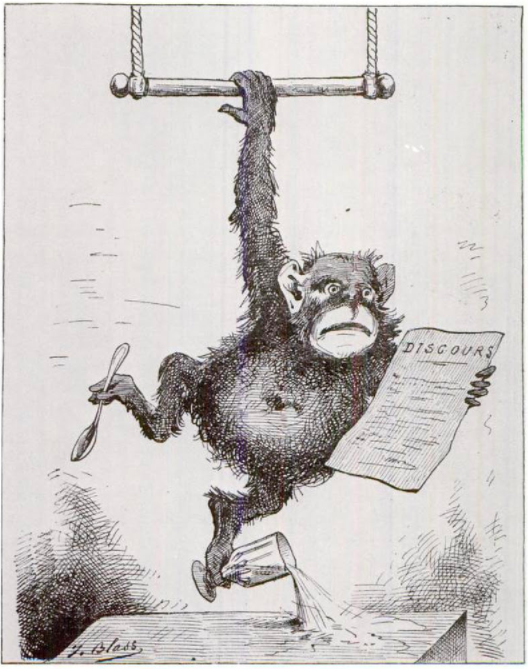
"Senator Broca will henceforth give examples of behavior in line with his theories." Le Triboulet, February 1880.

The discovery of Broca's area revolutionized the understanding of language processing, speech production, and comprehension, as well as what effects damage to this area may cause. Broca played a major role in the localization of function debate, by resolving the issue scientifically with Leborgne and his 12 cases thereafter. His research led others to discover the location of a wide variety of other functions, specifically Wernicke's area.

New research has found that dysfunction in the area may lead to other speech disorders such as stuttering and apraxia of speech. Recent anatomical neuroimaging studies have shown that the pars opercularis of Broca's area is anatomically smaller in individuals who stutter whereas the pars triangularis appears to be normal.

He also invented more than 20 measuring instruments for the use in craniology, and helped standardize measuring procedures.

His name is one of the 72 names inscribed on the Eiffel Tower.

== Honors and Awards ==
- Officer of the Order of Legion of Honour (1868)
- Knight of the Order of Legion of Honour (1879)

== Selected publications ==
- 1849. De la propagation de l'inflammation – Quelques propositions sur les tumeurs dites cancéreuses. Doctoral dissertation.
- 1856. Des anévrysmes et de leur traitement. Paris: Labé & Asselin
- 1861. "Sur le principe des localisations cérébrales". Bulletin de la Société d'Anthropologie 2: 190–204.
- 1861. "Perte de la parole, ramollissement chronique et destruction partielle du lobe antérieur gauche." Bulletin de la Société d'Anthropologie 2: 235–38.
- 1861. "Remarques sur le siège de la faculté du langage articulé, suivies d'une observation d'aphémie (perte de la parole)." Bulletin de la Société Anatomique de Paris 6: 330–357
- 1861. "Nouvelle observation d'aphémie produite par une lésion de la moitié postérieure des deuxième et troisième circonvolution frontales." Bulletin de la Société Anatomique 36: 398–407.
- 1863. "Localisations des fonctions cérébrales. Siège de la faculté du langage articulé." Bulletin de la Société d'Anthropologie 4: 200–208.
- 1864. On the phenomena of hybridity in the genus Homo. London: Pub. for the Anthropological society, by Longman, Green, Longman, & Roberts
- 1865. "Sur le siège de la faculté du langage articulé." Bulletin de la Société d'Anthropologie 6: 377–393
- 1866. "Sur la faculté générale du langage, dans ses rapports avec la faculté du langage articulé." Bulletin de la Société d'Anthropologie deuxième série 1: 377–82
- 1871–1878. Mémoires d'anthropologie, 3 vols. Paris: C. Reinwald (vol. 1 | vol. 2 | vol. 3)
- 1879. "Instructions relatives à l'étude anthropologique du système dentaire." In: Bulletins de la Société d'anthropologie de Paris, III° Série. Tome 2, 1879. pp. 128–163.

== Literature ==
- Androutsos G, Diamantis A (2007). "Paul Broca (1824–1880): founder of anthropology, pioneer of neurology and oncology". Journal of the Balkan Union of Oncology. 12 (4): 557–64. PMID 18067221.
- Alajouanine T, Signoret JL (1980). "Paul Broca and aphasia" [Paul Broca and aphasia]. Bulletin de l'Académie Nationale de Médecine (in French). 164 (6): 545–51. PMID 7008915.
- Bendiner E (November 1986). "Paul Broca: adventurer in the recesses of the mind". Hospital Practice. 21 (11A): 104–12, 117, 120–1 passim. PMID 3097033.
- Buckingham HW (2006). "The Marc Dax (1770–1837)/Paul Broca (1824–1880) controversy over priority in science: left hemisphere specificity for seat of articulate language and for lesions that cause aphemia". Clinical Linguistics & Phonetics. 20 (7–8): 613–9. doi:10.1080/02699200500266703. PMID 17056493. S2CID 45990106.
- Cambier J (July 1980). "Paul Broca, 100 years after his death, 1880–1980" [Paul Broca, 100 years after his death, 1880–1980]. La Nouvelle Presse Médicale (in French). 9 (29): 1983. PMID 6995932.
- Castaigne P (1980). "Paul Broca (1824–1880)" [Paul Broca (1824–1880)]. Revue neurologique (in French). 136 (10): 559–62. PMID 7010498.
- Clower WT, Finger S (December 2001). "Discovering trepanation: the contribution of Paul Broca". Neurosurgery. 49 (6): 1417–25, discussion 1425–6. doi:10.1097/00006123-200112000-00021. PMID 11846942. S2CID 16318753.
- "Commemoration of the centenary of the death of Paul Broca" [Commemoration of the centenary of the death of Paul Broca]. Chirurgie (in French). 106 (10): 773–93. 1980. PMID 7011701.
- Cowie SE (2000). "A place in history: Paul Broca and cerebral localization". Journal of Investigative Surgery. 13 (6): 297–8. doi:10.1080/089419300750059334. PMID 11202005. S2CID 19915555.
- D'Aubigné RM (1980). "Paul Broca and surgery of the motor system" [Paul Broca and surgery of the motor system]. Chirurgie (in French). 106 (10): 791–3. PMID 7011706.
- Dechaume M, Huard P (1980). "Paul Broca (182401880). Dentist or dentistry in the last century" [Paul Broca (182401880). Dentist or dentistry in the last century]. Actualités Odonto-stomatologiques (in French). 34 (132): 537–43. PMID 7015804.
- Delmas A (1980). "Paul Broca and anatomy" [Paul Broca and anatomy]. Bulletin de l'Académie Nationale de Médecine (in French). 164 (6): 552–6. PMID 7008916.
- Denoix P (1980). "Paul Broca : pathological anatomy, cancer, statistics (author's transl)" [Paul Broca : pathological anatomy, cancer, statistics]. Chirurgie (in French). 106 (10): 787–90. PMID 7011705.
- Finger, Stanley (2000). Minds Behind the Brain. Oxford University Press. ISBN 0-19-508571-X.
- Finger S (June 2004). "Paul Broca (1824–1880)". Journal of Neurology. 251 (6): 769–70. doi:10.1007/s00415-004-0456-6. PMID 15311362. S2CID 34597873.
- Frédy D (1996). "Paul Broca (1824–1880)" [Paul Broca (1824–1880)]. Histoire des sciences médicales (in French). 30 (2): 199–208. PMID 11624874.
- Greenblatt SH (1970). "Huglings Jackson's first encounter with the work of Paul Broca: the physiological and philosophical background". Bulletin of the History of Medicine. 44 (6): 555–70. PMID 4925020.
- Harris LJ (January 1991). "Cerebral control for speech in right-handers and left-handers: an analysis of the views of Paul Broca, his contemporaries, and his successors". Brain and Language. 40 (1): 1–50. doi:10.1016/0093-934X(91)90115-H. PMID 2009444. S2CID 36454926.
- Huard P, Aaron C, Askienazy S, Corlieu P, Fredy D, Vedrenne C (October 1980). "The death of Paul Broca (1824–1880)" [The death of Paul Broca (1824–1880)]. Bulletin de l'Académie Nationale de Médecine (in French). 164 (7): 682–5. PMID 7013939.
- Huard P (1980). "Paul Broca, anatomist (author's transl)" [Paul Broca, anatomist]. Chirurgie (in French). 106 (10): 774–6. PMID 7011702.
- Huard P, Aaron C, Askienazy S, Corlieu P, Fredy D, Vedrenne C (March 1982). "The brain of Paul Broca (1824–1880). Correlation of pathological and computed tomography findings (author's transl)" [The brain of Paul Broca (1824–1880). Correlation of pathological and computed tomography findings]. Journal de Radiologie (in French). 63 (3): 175–80. PMID 7050373.
- Huard P (October 1961). "Paul BROCA (1824–1880)" [Paul BROCA (1824–1880)]. Concours Médical (in French). 83: 4917–20. PMID 14036412.
- Huard P (October 1961). "Paul BROCA (1829–1880)" [Paul BROCA (1829–1880)]. Concours Médical (in French). 83: 5069–74 concl. PMID 14036413.
- Houdart R (1980). "Paul Broca : precursor of neurological disciplines (author's transl)" [Paul Broca : precursor of neurological disciplines]. Chirurgie (in French). 106 (10): 783–6. PMID 7011704.
- Jay V (March 2002). "Pierre Paul Broca". Archives of Pathology & Laboratory Medicine. 126 (3): 250–1. doi:10.5858/2002-126-0250-PPB. ISSN 0003-9985. PMID 11860295.
- LaPointe, Leonard (2012). Paul Broca and the Origins of Language in the Brain. San Diego, Plural Publishing, Inc. Archived from the original on 3 January 2015.
- Lee DA (May 1981). "Paul Broca and the history of aphasia: Roland P. Mackay Award Essay, 1980". Neurology. 31 (5): 600–2. doi:10.1212/wnl.31.5.600. PMID 7015163. S2CID 23037749.
- Leischner A (May 1972). "Paul Broca and significance of his works for clinical pathology of the brain" [Paul Broca and significance of his works for clinical pathology of the brain]. Bratislavské Lekárske Listy (in Slovak). 57 (5): 615–23. PMID 4554955.
- Lukács D (August 1980). "Pierre Paul Broca, founder of anthropology and discoverer of the cortical speech center" [Pierre Paul Broca, founder of anthropology and discoverer of the cortical speech center]. Orvosi Hetilap (in Hungarian). 121 (34): 2081–2. PMID 7005822.
- Monod-Broca P (October 2001). "Paul Broca: 1824–1880". Annales de Chirurgie (in French). 126 (8): 801–7. doi:10.1016/S0003-3944(01)00600-9. PMID 11692769.
- Monod-Broca P (1980). "Paul Broca (1824–1880). The surgeon, the man" [Paul Broca (1824–1880). The surgeon, the man]. Bulletin de l'Académie Nationale de Médecine (in French). 164 (6): 536–44. PMID 7008914.
- Monod-Broca P (April 2006). "The other Paul Broca" [The other Paul Broca]. La Revue du Praticien (in French). 56 (8): 923–5. PMID 16764255.
- Natali J (1980). "Paul Broca, vascular surgeon (author's transl)" [Paul Broca, vascular surgeon]. Chirurgie (in French). 106 (10): 777–82. PMID 7011703.
- Olry R, Nicolay X (1994). "From Paul Broca to the long-term potentiation: the difficulties in confirming a limbic identity" [From Paul Broca to the long-term potentiation: the difficulties in confirming a limbic identity]. Histoire des Sciences Médicales (in French). 28 (3): 199–203. PMID 11640329.
- Pineau H (1980). "Paul Broca and anthropology" [Paul Broca and anthropology]. Bulletin de l'Académie Nationale de Médecine (in French). 164 (6): 557–62. PMID 7008917.
- Schiller F (May 1983). "Paul Broca and the history of aphasia". Neurology. 33 (5): 667. doi:10.1212/wnl.33.5.667. PMID 6341875. S2CID 43728185.
- Schiller, Francis (1979). Paul Broca, Founder of French Anthropology, Explorer of the Brain. University of California Press. ISBN 978-0-520-03744-1.
- Stone JL (July 1991). "Paul Broca and the first craniotomy based on cerebral localization". Journal of Neurosurgery. 75 (1): 154–9. doi:10.3171/jns.1991.75.1.0154. PMID 2045905.
- Valette G (1980). "Address at the meeting dedicated to the centenary of the death of Paul Broca (1824–1880)" [Address at the meeting dedicated to the centenary of the death of Paul Broca (1824–1880)]. Bulletin de l'Académie Nationale de Médecine (in French). 164 (6): 535. PMID 7008913.
- Wyplosz J (May 2003). "Paul Broca: the protohistory of neurosurgery" [Paul Broca: the protohistory of neurosurgery]. La Revue du Praticien (in French). 53 (9): 937–40. PMID 12816030.
