= Kensington, California =

Unincorporated community in California, United States

Kensington
- Census designated place and unincorporated community
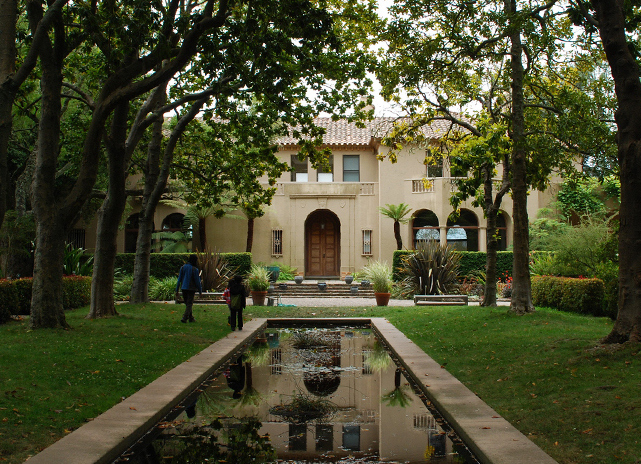
- Blake Garden, Kensington

- Location in Contra Costa County and the state of California
- Coordinates: 37°54′38″N 122°16′49″W
- Country: United States
- State: California
- County: Contra Costa

Government
  - County Board: District 1: John Gioia
  - State Senate: Jesse Arreguín (D)
  - State Assembly: Buffy Wicks (D)
  - U. S. Congress: John Garamendi (D)

Area
  - Total: 0.973 sq mi (2.52 km^{2})
  - Land: 0.964 sq mi (2.50 km^{2})
  - Water: 0.009 sq mi (0.023 km^{2}) 0.92%
- Elevation: 587 ft (179 m)

Population (2020)
  - Total: 5,428
  - Density: 5,630/sq mi (2,170/km^{2})
- Time zone: UTC-8 (PST)
  - Summer (DST): UTC-7 (PDT)
- ZIP codes: 94707, 94708
- Area code: 510, 341
- GNIS ID: 1658891, 2408472
- FIPS code: 06-38086

Kensington is an unincorporated community and census designated place located in the Berkeley Hills, in the East Bay, part of the San Francisco Bay Area, in Contra Costa County, California, United States.

Many distinguished University of California, Berkeley professors, Nobel Prize laureates, and other notable San Francisco Bay Area professionals reside or have resided in Kensington, such as Robert Oppenheimer who was the director of the Manhattan Project's Project Y that developed the atomic bombs during World War II. The population was 5,428 at the 2020 census.

== Law and government ==
Kensington is an unincorporated community of Contra Costa County that borders Alameda County. Unlike many unincorporated communities, Kensington has local jurisdiction over its police department, park services, refuse collection, and fire department. These are governed by two elected boards. The five-member Kensington Police Protection and Community Services District (KPPCSD) Board oversees the police department, park services, and refuse collection. The five-member Kensington Fire District Board oversees the fire department and emergency medical services, of which the day-to-day function is outsourced to the fire department of El Cerrito, a neighboring city. The Kensington Municipal Advisory Board (KMAC) is a commission whose members are appointed by the Contra Costa County Board of Supervisors. KMAC is responsible for reviewing land use and development and provides recommendations to the county's planning and public works departments.

The sewer system is maintained by the Stege Sanitary District, which also includes the city of El Cerrito and the Richmond Annex area of Richmond. The East Bay Municipal Utility District supplies water and wastewater treatment services. AC Transit operates local transit service.

== History ==
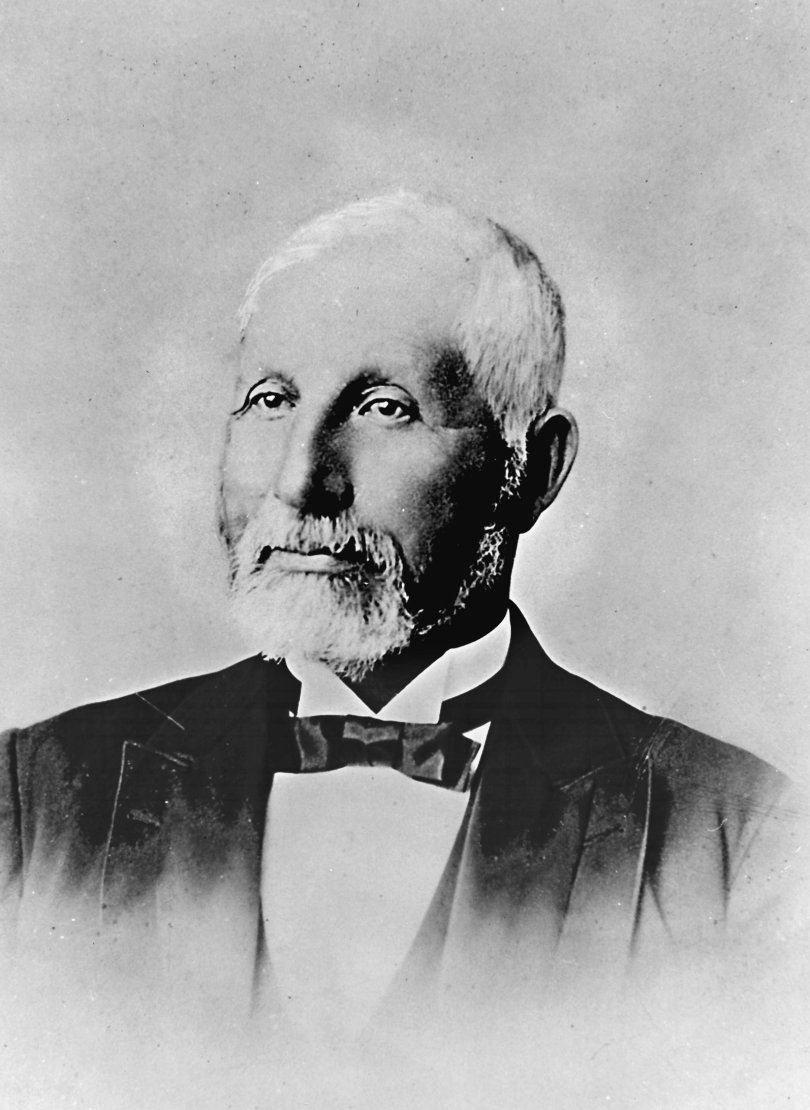
Don Víctor Castro, a Californio ranchero and politician, owned the area where Kensington was founded, as part of his Rancho San Pablo.

The area that is now Kensington was originally the territory of the Huchiun band of the Ohlone Indigenous people who occupied much of the East Bay of the San Francisco Bay Area. The Pedro Fages mapping expedition passed through the area in 1772.

In 1823, the Republic of Mexico granted Rancho San Pablo, an extent of land lying north of Cerrito Creek and the Rancho San Antonio, including that portion of land that is now Kensington, to Francisco María Castro, a veteran of the Mexican Army and former alcalde of San José. In 1831, his youngest son, Victor Castro, inherited the southern portion of the rancho, including what is now Kensington.

In 1892, Anson Blake purchased a portion of Castro's land, most of which is now Kensington.

George Shima bought ten acres north of Cerrito Creek and east of the present-day Arlington Avenue in about 1911, intending to build a home there. He hosted an annual community picnic on the property for some time.

Land development companies had bought most of the Kensington area by 1911, when it was first surveyed. The area was named "Kensington" that year by Robert Brousefield, a surveyor who had lived in the London district of South Kensington in the Royal Borough of Kensington and Chelsea at one time. The first subdivisions were Kensington Park and Berkeley Park, located west of Arlington Avenue, with most streets named after locations in England, and Berkeley Highlands, which featured streets named after colleges and universities.

Farmers in Kensington resisted inclusion in the city of El Cerrito when it was incorporated in 1917, and local voters have rejected incorporation on multiple occasions since then.

In the 1920s, the East Bay Municipal Utility District (EBMUD) constructed an aqueduct through the Berkeley Hills to transport water from the San Pablo Reservoir to a still-active pumping facility in Kensington, located just above the Colusa Circle. Some of the water received by this facility is pumped up the hill to the Summit Reservoir located at the top of Spruce Street. The rest is pumped to other reservoirs serving the East Bay.

The population of Kensington was 226 in 1920, 1,423 in 1930, 3,355 in 1940, and reached a peak of 6,601 in 1950.

During World War II, J. Robert Oppenheimer lived at 10 Kenilworth Court. The house is often mistakenly described as being in Berkeley. Later in his life, Oppenheimer lived at 1 Eagle Hill, also in Kensington.

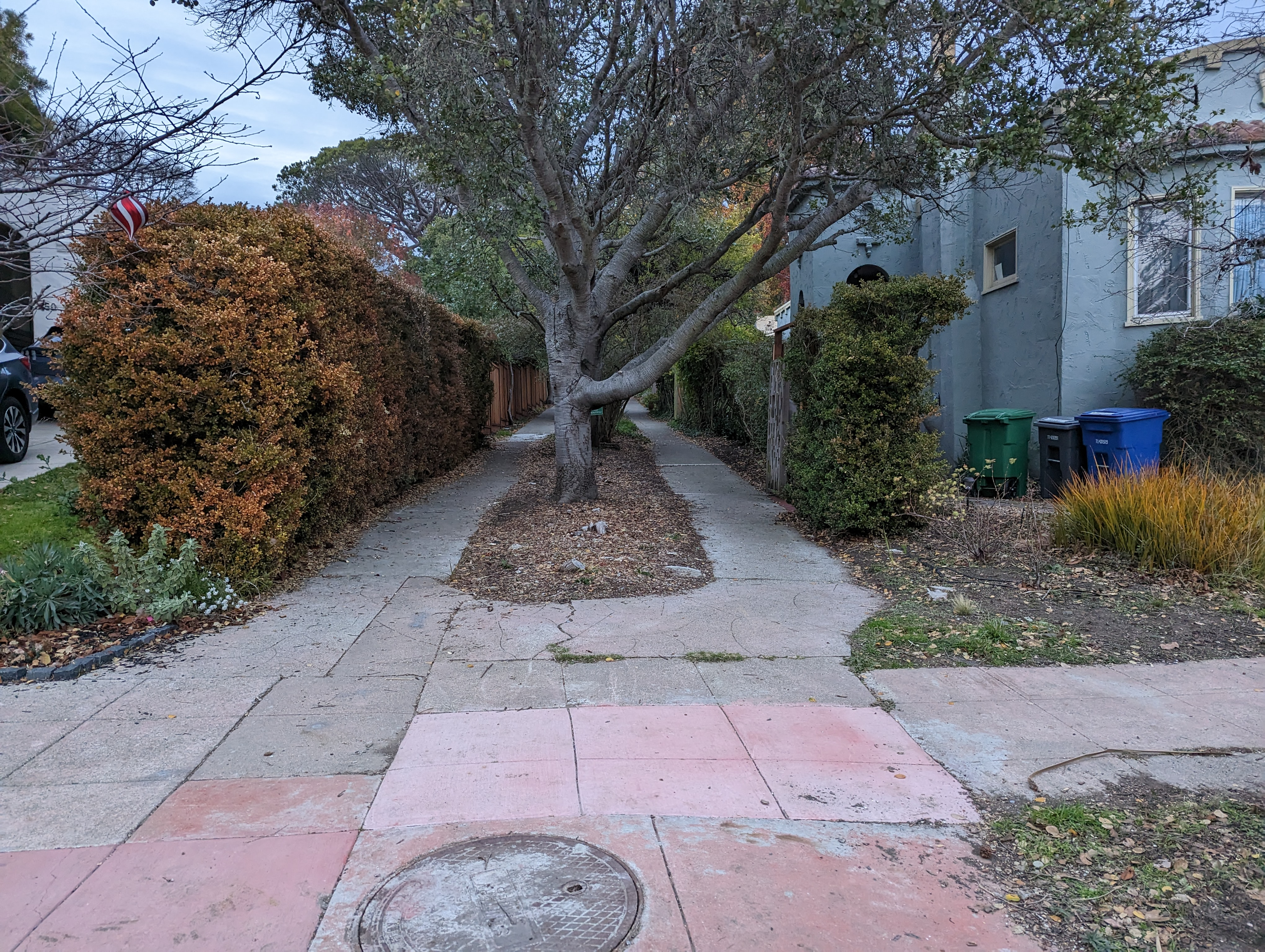
Entrance to Ardmore Path

Until 1948, streetcar line #7 of the Key System ran to Kensington from Berkeley along Arlington Avenue, terminating in the small commercial area at Amherst Avenue. The streetcar was then replaced by an AC Transit bus route of the same number, which continues to run along Arlington Avenue. The streetcar service played a crucial role in the development of Kensington and was supported by a network of mid-block pedestrian paths, many of which remain in place to this day. The pathways, which traverse Kensington, were dedicated for public use to the County of Contra Costa at the time the various subdivision maps were recorded. The County never accepted the offer of dedication, and accordingly, the ownership of the pathways has been in a state of uncertainty. Some of the pathways are used by the public regularly, and some have fallen into disuse, are overgrown with foliage, or have been absorbed into neighboring properties.

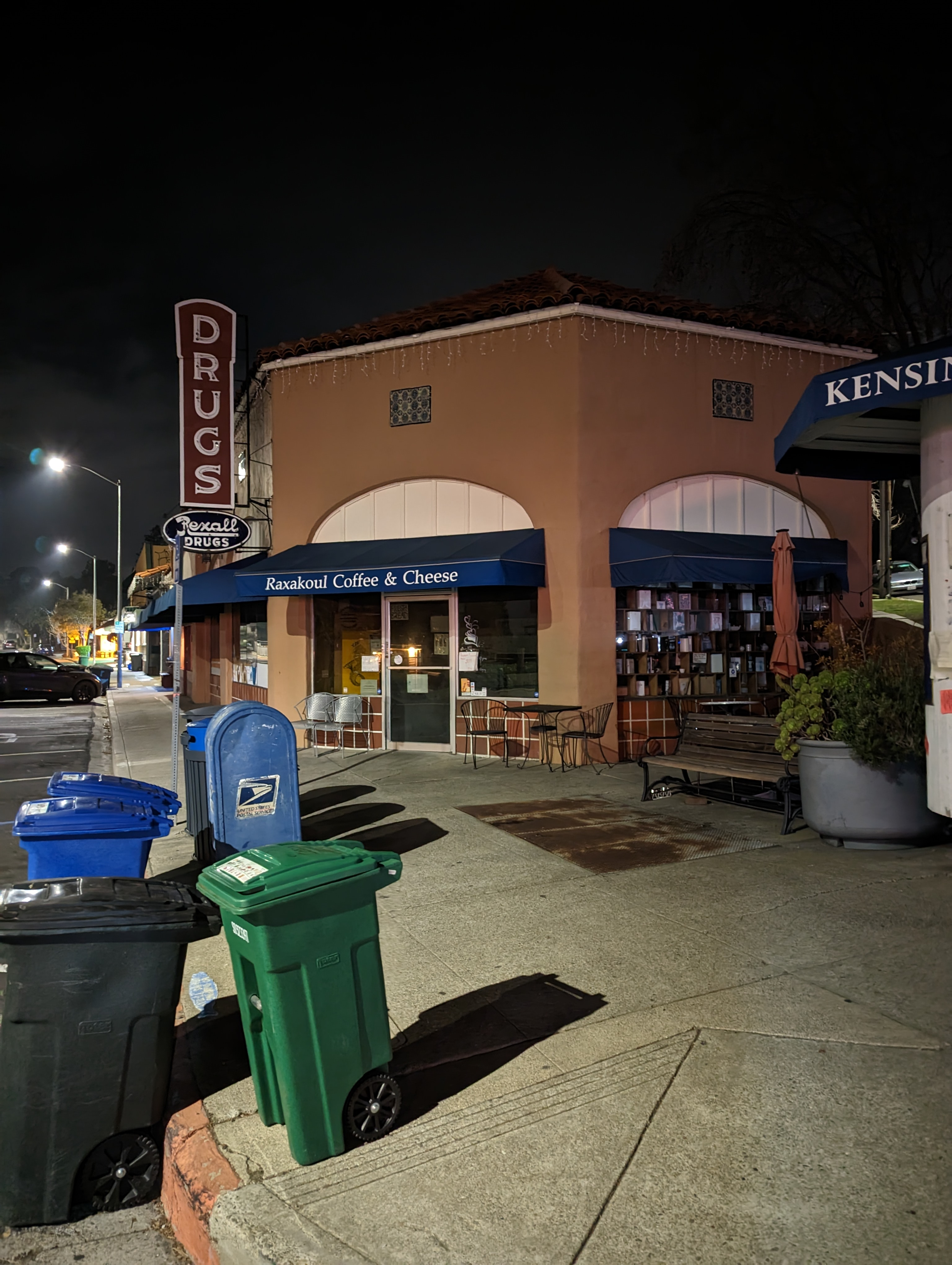
Stein's pharmacy at Amherst and Arlington

The late local historian Louis Stein Jr. lived and worked in Kensington, maintaining a pharmacy on the corner of Amherst and Arlington Avenue. For many years, he kept one of the East Bay's oldest horsecars in his yard—one that had probably seen service between Temescal, Oakland and the University of California, Berkeley. The horsecar is now at the Western Railway Museum.

== Geography ==
According to the United States Census Bureau, the CDP has a total area of 1.0 square mile (2.6 km^{2}).

Kensington borders Berkeley and Albany to the south, El Cerrito to its west and north, and Wildcat Canyon Regional Park and Tilden Regional Park to the east.

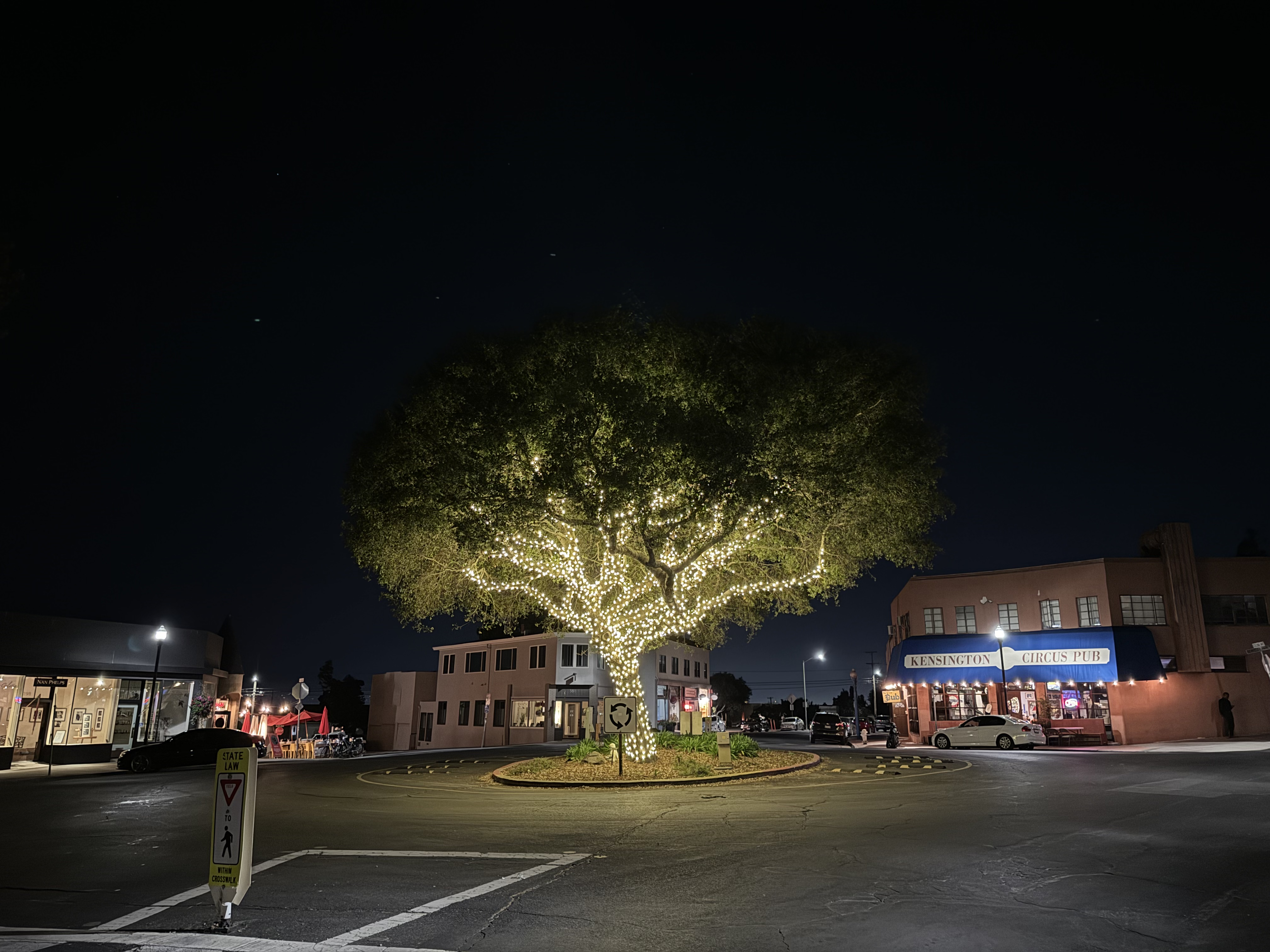
Kensington Circus / Colusa Circle

Kensington is primarily a single-family residential area, with two small shopping districts. One of these is located on Arlington Avenue (at Amherst), the other centered on the Colusa Circle.

== Demographics ==
Historical population
Census	Pop.	Note	%±
1970	5,823		—
1980	5,342		−8.3%
1990	4,974		−6.9%
2000	4,936		−0.8%
2010	5,077		2.9%
2020	5,428		6.9%
U.S. Decennial Census; 1970 1980; 1990 2000 2010

In the 1950s, many affluent professional white residents of nearby Richmond moved to Kensington and adjacent El Cerrito as the African American population of Richmond increased from 1 percent in 1940 to 13 percent in 1950 to meet the needs of its growing wartime and post-war industrial base.

Kensington first appeared as an unincorporated community in the 1970 U.S. census; and as a census-designated place in the 1980 United States census.

=== Racial and ethnic composition ===
Kensington CDP, California – Racial and ethnic composition Note: the US Census treats Hispanic/Latino as an ethnic category. This table excludes Latinos from the racial categories and assigns them to a separate category. Hispanics/Latinos may be of any race.
Race / Ethnicity (NH = Non-Hispanic)	Pop 2000	Pop 2010	Pop 2020	% 2000	% 2010	% 2020
White alone (NH)	3,942	3,796	3,690	79.86%	74.77%	67.98%
Black or African American alone (NH)	123	128	96	2.49%	2.52%	1.77%
Native American or Alaska Native alone (NH)	6	3	4	0.12%	0.06%	0.07%
Asian alone (NH)	517	603	723	10.47%	11.88%	13.32%
Native Hawaiian or Pacific Islander alone (NH)	0	2	2	0.00%	0.04%	0.04%
Other race alone (NH)	12	23	46	0.24%	0.45%	0.85%
Mixed race or Multiracial (NH)	164	259	476	3.32%	5.10%	8.77%
Hispanic or Latino (any race)	172	263	391	3.48%	5.18%	7.20%
Total	4,936	5,077	5,428	100.00%	100.00%	100.00%

=== 2020 census ===
As of the 2020 census, Kensington had a population of 5,428. The population density was 5,630.7 inhabitants per square mile (2,174.0/km^{2}). The census reported that 99.8% of the population lived in households, 0.2% lived in non-institutionalized group quarters, and no one was institutionalized. 100.0% of residents lived in urban areas, while 0.0% lived in rural areas.

There were 2,220 households, of which 27.3% had children under the age of 18 living in them. Of all households, 57.4% were married-couple households, 4.8% were cohabiting couple households, 12.5% were households with a male householder and no spouse or partner present, and 25.3% were households with a female householder and no spouse or partner present. About 24.3% of all households were made up of individuals and 15.1% had someone living alone who was 65 years of age or older. The average household size was 2.44. There were 1,533 families (69.1% of all households).

The age distribution was 17.7% under the age of 18, 5.1% aged 18 to 24, 20.3% aged 25 to 44, 28.1% aged 45 to 64, and 28.9% aged 65 or older. The median age was 50.5 years. For every 100 females, there were 88.1 males, and for every 100 females age 18 and over there were 86.6 males age 18 and over.

There were 2,334 housing units at an average density of 2,421.2 units per square mile (934.8 units/km^{2}). Of the 2,334 housing units, 4.9% were vacant. Of the 2,220 occupied units, 82.4% were owner-occupied and 17.6% were occupied by renters. The homeowner vacancy rate was 1.1% and the rental vacancy rate was 4.9%.

== Education ==
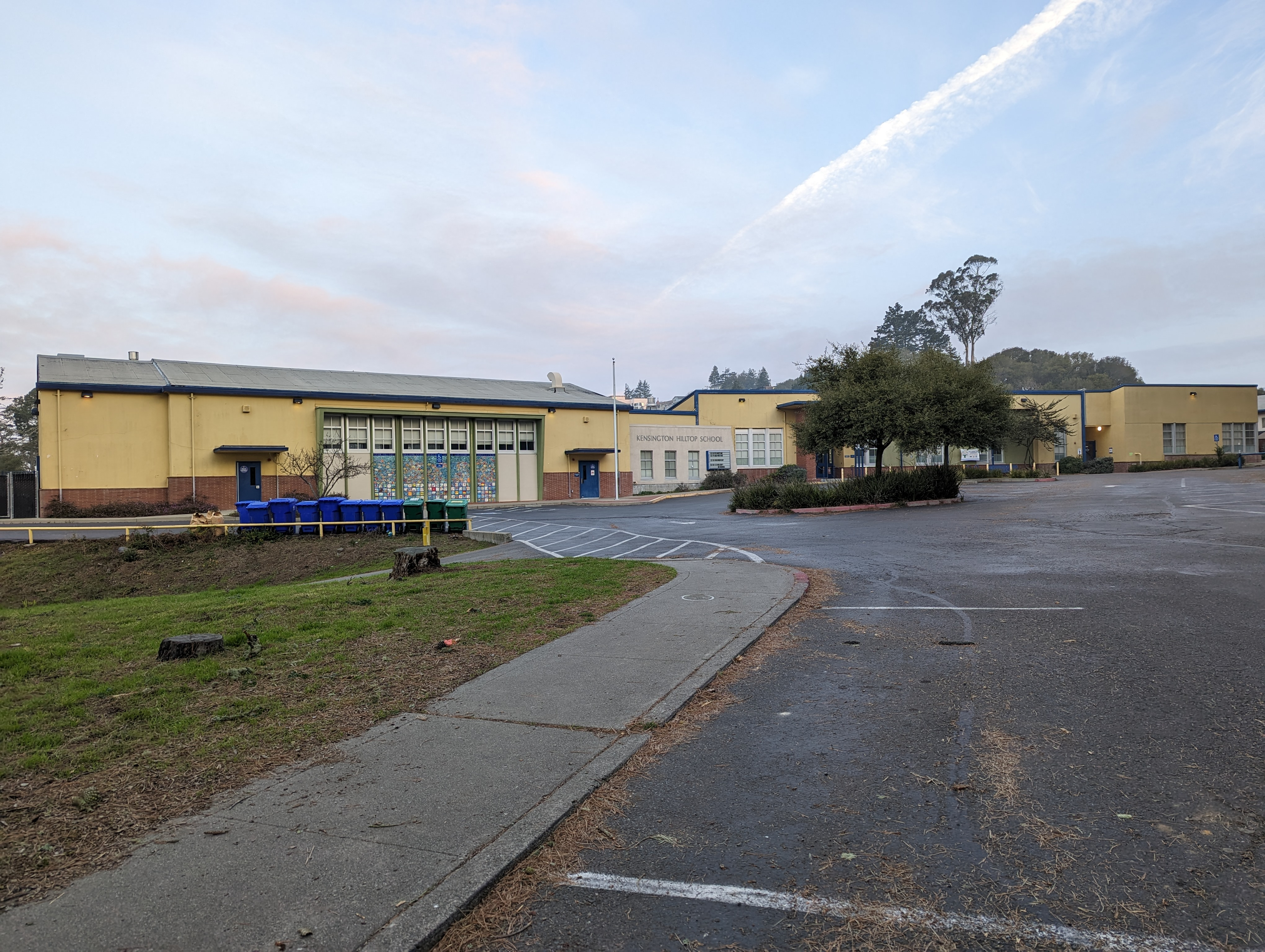
Kensington Elementary School, Kensington

Kensington Elementary School, part of the West Contra Costa Unified School District, provides K-6 public education to residents within the school's boundaries.

== Religious institutions ==
There are two churches in Kensington, Arlington Community Church (United Church of Christ), completed and dedicated in 1948, and the Unitarian Universalist Church of Berkeley, which in 1961 moved from its original home in Berkeley to land in Kensington purchased from church member and architect Bernard Maybeck. There is also a Tibetan Buddhist meditation center and a Carmelite monastery adjacent to Blake Garden.

== Points of interest ==
- Blake Garden

== Notable people ==
- Daniel I. Arnon (1910–1994), plant physiologist and National Medal of Science recipient
- Eileen Christelow (born 1943), children's book author and illustrator
- Bertha Damon (1881–1975), humorist, author, and editor
- Florence Nightingale David (1909–1993), statistician
- Nina Dronkers, cognitive neuroscientist
- Martin Eberhard (born 1960), engineer and co-founder of Tesla, Inc.
- Daniel Ellsberg (1931–2023), political activist, economist, and military analyst
- Evelyn Fix (1904–1965), statistician
- Marsha Hunt (born 1946), actress, novelist, and singer
- Mollie Katzen (born 1950), cookbook author and artist
- David Kundtz, self-help author and psychotherapist
- William Mandel (1917–2016), broadcast journalist and author
- Kitty Oppenheimer (1910–1972), biologist and botanist
- Peer Portner (1940–2009), heart researcher
- Christa Whitney (born 1987), oral historian and documentary filmmaker
- Kit Woolsey (born 1943), bridge and backgammon player

== See also ==
- Kensington Ladies' Erotica Society
