= Brunsviga =

Former calculating device manufacturer

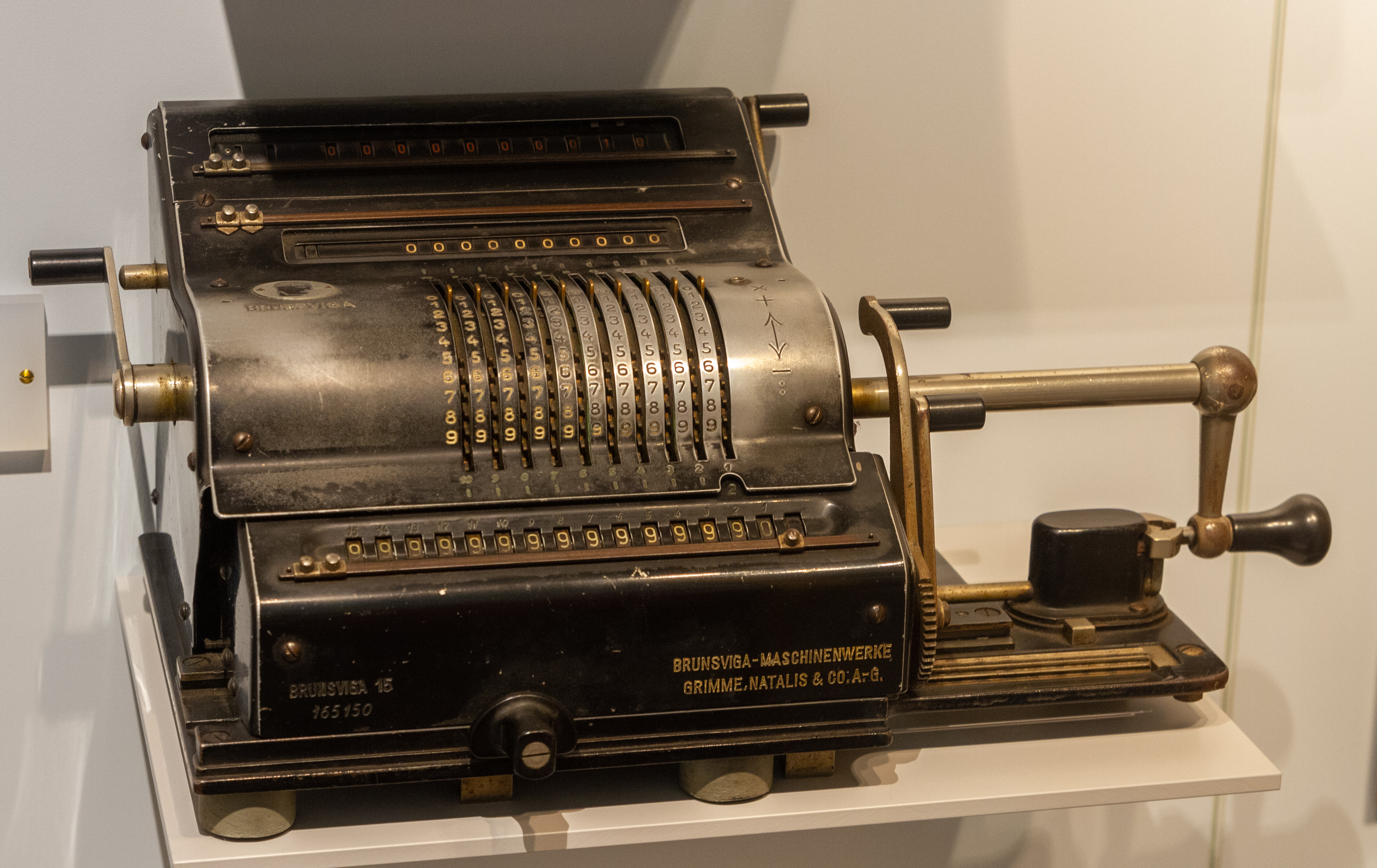
Brunsviga 15 Mechanical Calculator

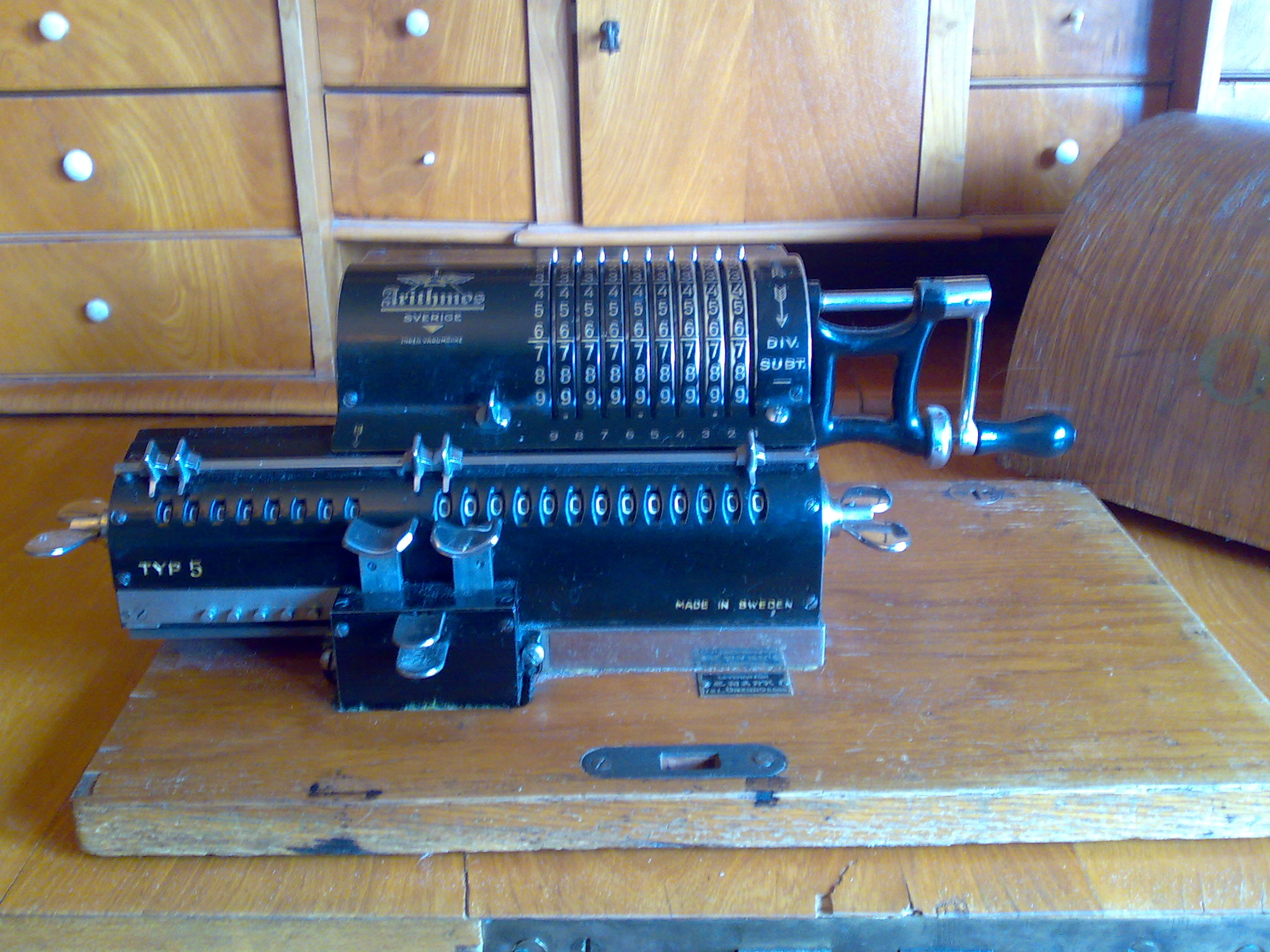
Original Odhner-Arithmos-Typ-5

Brunsviga was a calculating machine company whose history goes back to 1892. They produced mechanical calculators, hand operated but later also electrically driven. The firm Grimme, Natalis & Co that manufactured the machines changed their name to Brunsviga Maschinenwerke A.G. in 1927.

== Origins ==
The Brunsviga device had its roots in the arithmometer developed by Willgodt Theophil Odhner (1845–1905), a Swedish engineer who emigrated to Russia for work purposes in 1868 or 1869 after having studied mechanics at the Royal Institute of Technology in Stockholm. Odhner was hired by his fellow Swede Ludvig Nobel (Alfred Nobel's brother) who was the head of an arms factory. His job there was to fix the so-called Thomas Arithmometers, named after their designer in the 1820s. The term arithmometer covered mechanical calculating devices that were able to perform all the four arithmetic operations. Odhner improved and simplified the expensive devices by implementing a different transmission system.

== Beginnings ==
In 1878, as he tried to expand his business, Odhner partnered with Karl Königsberger, a commercial advisor and merchant in the guild of Saint-Petersburg. The latter filed patents in numerous countries including Germany with the German patent n° 7393.11 on 19 November 1878. In 1892, one of the top executives of the German's sewing machine firm Grimme & Natalis bought Odhner's patent for his device. His intention was to use the same production tools for both sewing and calculating machines. The patent included distribution rights in Germany, Belgium and Switzerland and the calculating machines were launched under the brand's name "Brunsviga", in reference to the city of Braunschweig, where the firm Grimme & Natalis was based.

== Types of Brunsviga calculating devices ==
The first device, the "A" type, was launched in July 1892 under the name Brunsviga and resembled Odhner's devices. Multiple modifications to its design as well as capabilities were made afterwards by the engineer Franz Trinks, who was then head executive of Brunsviga. In the twenty years to follow, 89 German patents and 152 in other countries were filed based on his inventions. Some machines were now able to perform simultaneously multiple operations (not more than three), as did the Trinks-Triplex, launched shortly before World War I whose 19 typing levers could display results as long as 20 digits.

The launch of the Brunsviga Novas occurred around 1925, the same year as that of the Brunsviga 13. In 1929, Franz Trinks developed his last model, the Brunsviga Dupla, which happened to be electrical. He died in 1931.

In 1952 60 years after the first model, 60 different types were available on the market and the firm accounted for 265.000 sales.

In 1952, Brunsviga Maschinenwerke AG employed a thousand people. Between 1926 and 1930, after launching Nova and type 13, 40,000 devices were produced equalling the production in numbers of nearly 30 years between 1892 and 1921. According to Peter Faulstich in his article, the name Brunsviga was used for fifty years to refer to calculating machines.

== Reasons for success ==
=== An adequate response to market needs ===
In 1872, in a specialized journal, the conditions for calculating machines to meet market needs were written as follows: "If a reliable calculating machine could be manufactured to retail at a low price, say five dollars, with which addition, subtraction, multiplication, and division could be done, it would no doubt find a ready- sale, as all go-ahead business men want such a time-saver . . ." By streamlining their production under the guidance of Herman Hoffmeister (1886–1930), Brunsviga was able to support mass production at reasonable cost of devices meeting market needs. The company also worked on reducing the weight and dimensions of their final product to facilitate the dispatch by launching miniature series (A, B and J) or other compact models such as the Brunsviga 13, allowing them as well to reduce selling prices. Simultaneously, in the early 1920s, numerous sectors such as Insurance companies, Statistics, Geodesy, Astronomy or Engineering implemented the use of the calculating machine into their calculation processes. Even more broadly, every sector with a requirement for precise calculation processes found itself in need of calculating machines. The brutal population growth and even bigger demands in the matter of economical calculation required such calculations to be done quickly and at rational costs.

=== A dense and international distribution network ===
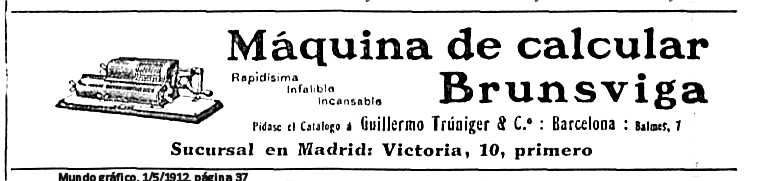
Maquina-de-calcular Brunsviga, 1912

The market penetration of the brand was accompanied by the filing of numerous patents. Before 1915, Germany alone accounted for more than a hundred patents, and 200 others were filed internationally. In 1906, Brunsviga's sales agents were based in London, Paris, Stockholm, Concepción, Buenos Aires, São Paulo and Johannesburg. The company now had branch offices in the Netherlands and in Denmark. In 1931, adding to the 30 offices in Germany, 90 more opened their doors in foreign countries

=== Some efficient marketing strategies ===
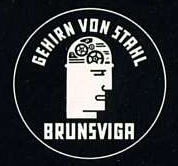
Brunsviga tagline, Brain of Steel

In 1909, the company introduced the tagline "the brain of steel" alongside an illustration from fellow Brunswick native mathematician Carl Friedrich Gauss. In the late 1920s, the graphist Günther Clausen (1885–1954) chose to modify the drawing of the head, and the tagline read "calculate everything".

Alongside marketing strategies, the firm made use of specialized magazines as well as the press to promote the use of calculating machines: the Manchester Guardian for instance, showed an image of a worker with his Brunsviga. Artists too were sought to publish in the monthly company magazine. For the twenty year's anniversary of Brunsviga in 1912, a brochure was published under the title When calculating machines have a heart, whose author, Fritz Müller later republished it as a short story. The painter and graphist from Brunswick, Karl Bock (1873–1940), created the cover of the brochure while Austrian artist August Mandlick (1860–1934) took care of the illustrations. Lastly, the writer Abraham Halberthal (1881–1969), under the pseudonym A. Halbert, published short stories in the company monthly magazine to present the calculating machine.

== Notable scientists and collectors using the Brunsviga machine ==
Many scientists worked with the Brunsviga. Amongst them, Enrico Fermi used it at the very beginning of his work on nuclear chain reaction, also Karl Pearson, Stephen Wilson' and Sydney Holt. Some Brunsviga machines can also be found in museums such as the model C at the Smithsonian. The Henri Poincaré Institute also owns one.

== Decline ==
In 1959, the company Olympia Werke took full control of Brunsviga Maschinenwerke AG. Shortly after, in 1962, most of the existing models (11S, 11E, 16E, 13BR, 18 RK, D 18 R, D13 R/1 D13 R2) saw their production stopped. The only ones remaining on the market up until 1963 were the 13RK, B20 and B183. The 13RM from the old range remained available up until 1964. The RT4 (1970–1971), which was made in Spain, was the last device launched by Olympia, but as a limited edition numbering only around 1500 copies. In 1972, Olympia stopped for good the production of mechanical calculating devices.
