= Gary Moncher =

American academic administrator

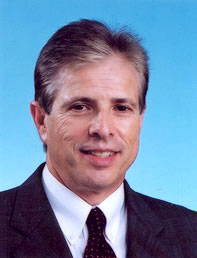
- Gary Moncher ^{[a]}
- Occupation(s): Professor, pastor and Patten University President
- Years active: 2000-2012

Gary Moncher was Patten University's third president in office and the first male president. He was appointed by Bebe Patten and the institution's board of directors and succeeded Priscilla C. Benham after seventeen years of service, fifty-six years after the establishment of the organization. He resigned as president in June 2012.
