= Antioch Unified School District =

Public school district in California

Location
- Antioch, California

District information
- Type: Public
- Established: 1921
- Superintendent: Darnise R Williams

Students and staff
- Students: approx. 17,000

Other information
- Website: www.antiochschools.net

The Antioch Unified School District (AUSD) serves approximately 17,000 students in the city of Antioch, California, and a portion of the neighboring city of Oakley. In 2025, Darnise R. Williams was the Superintendent of Schools.

== History ==
The Antioch Unified School District was formed in 1921 from the Antioch and Live Oak school districts. Formal education in Antioch began in 1850, in a converted ship's galley, with a 12-year-old girl as the sole teacher.

== Schools ==
=== High schools ===
- Antioch High School
- Deer Valley High School
- Dozier-Libbey Medical High School
- Live Oak High School
- Bidwell Continuation High School
- Prospects High School/Alternative Education
- Riverview Union High School (1911-1931)

=== Middle schools ===
- Antioch Middle School
- Black Diamond Middle School
- Dallas Ranch Middle School
- Orchard Park Middle School
- Park Middle School

=== Elementary schools ===
- Belshaw Elementary School
- Carmen Dragon Elementary School
- Diablo Vista Elementary School
- Fremont Elementary School
- MNO Grant Elementary School
- Kimball Elementary School
- Jack London Elementary School
- Lone Tree Elementary School
- Marsh Elementary School
- Mission Elementary School
- Muir Elementary School (formerly Antioch Primary School)
- Orchard Park School
- Sutter Elementary School
- Turner Elementary School

=== Virtual ===
- Thomas Gaines Virtual Academy
