= Deer Valley High School (California) =

Location
- 4700 Lone Tree Way; Antioch, California 94531; United States; 37.96364°N 121.77514°W

Information
- School type: Public
- Established: 1996
- School district: Antioch Unified School District
- Principal: Robert Bowers
- Staff: 84.72 (FTE)
- Grades: 9–12
- Enrollment: 1,804 (2023–2024)
- Student to teacher ratio: 21.29
- Colors: Teal, black, and silver
- Nickname: Wolverines, Dub Village
- Yearbook: The Wolverine
- Website: Official website

Deer Valley High School is a public secondary school in Antioch, California, serving southeast Antioch in Contra Costa County, California. It opened in 1996.

In 2007, the Antioch Unified School District named Scott Bergerhouse and Clarence Isadore co-principals. The co-principal model has previously been implemented in some larger schools in southern California.

In February 2010, Deer Valley and the rest of the AUSD schools were informed that they would issue a uniform policy in the second semester of the 2010–2011 school year. This policy proved to be a failure for the school, partly due to the policy taking effect halfway through the year. The policy was discontinued by its second month.

== Academics ==
The school is divided into four "houses", each of which has its own vice-principal and secretary. At the freshman and sophomore levels Deer Valley uses a teaming concept, where groups of students share the same English, math, science, and history teacher. In addition to core classes, a wide variety of elective classes are offered to students. In addition to instrumental and choral music, foreign language, drama, automotive, culinary, and art classes, students may also enroll in electives including video production, digital art, web design, animation, law, manufacturing, photography, and careers with children.

Deer Valley also houses academies: Antioch Unified School District has four Linked Learning academies in place throughout the district. There are four academies on the campus of Deer Valley High School, a Law Academy, a Performing Arts Academy, a Business Academy, and an ACE Academy.

The process for attending an academy begins in the second half of the eighth grade, when students and their parents have opportunities to attend presentations by each of the Learning Link academies. Students can apply for one or more by completing an application. The selection is by lottery; it is open to all district students without pre-testing; however, there is a 3.0 GPA requirement.

Located in House 2 of DVHS, the Law Academy curriculum includes three elements: law-related content embedded in required courses in English, social studies, math and science, law-specific elective courses such as Constitutional Law and Criminal Justice, and work-based learning throughout the four years of study.

Students enrolled in the Deer Valley Law Academy must take a fundamental criminal justice class in 9th grade, with the curriculum continuing on to the next year, and psychology in 11th grade. Deer Valley is also one of the few high schools in California with the option to take Philosophy; the Law students are placed as top priority in the enrollment process.

== DVHS Planetarium ==
Deer Valley High School is one of the few high schools in the Bay Area to have a planetarium.

== Incidents ==
=== 2009 shooting ===
On September 16, 2009, at about 8:29 am, a sixteen-year-old student of Deer Valley High School was shot in the arm and chest near the school. The shots were fired from a vehicle, which then drove off. The victim was airlifted to John Muir Medical Center and underwent surgery. The school, along with all other schools in the district, then went into lockdown later that morning. nineteen-year-old Yousuf Mohammad Aziz and another person were arrested in connection with the shooting. In 2011, Aziz was convicted of charges of premeditated attempted murder, assault with a firearm, shooting at an inhabited dwelling and two counts of street terrorism, and was sentenced to seven years to life in prison.

=== 2013 bomb threats ===
In April 2013, the school received continuous bomb threats in a single week, with evacuations held on an hourly basis due to safety concerns. These bomb threats were also sent out to Black Diamond Middle School as well, with these types of threats deemed "anonymous". It was later revealed that a sixteen-year-old student was responsible for the bomb threats, and was arrested soon after. No one was hurt during those evacuation periods.

=== 2020 shooting ===
On January 31, 2020, at around 8:30pm, a fight broke out in the parking lot of the school. A sixteen-year-old student, Jonathan Parker, was shot three times during a basketball game against cross-town rival Antioch High School. The teen later died from his injuries. The shooter, a student in Pittsburg CA, later turned himself in to the U.S. Marshal Service and the Oakland Police Department after hiding from authorities in Oakland, CA.

== Notable alumni ==
- Taiwan Jones, running back for the Buffalo Bills, Oakland Raiders, Houston Texans
- Marcus Lee, power forward for the California Golden Bears
- Sterling Moore, cornerback for the New Orleans Saints
- Kevin Pereira, co-host of G4's Attack of the Show!
- Nsimba Webster, class of 2014, wide receiver for the Los Angeles Rams 2019–Present
