= Patten University =

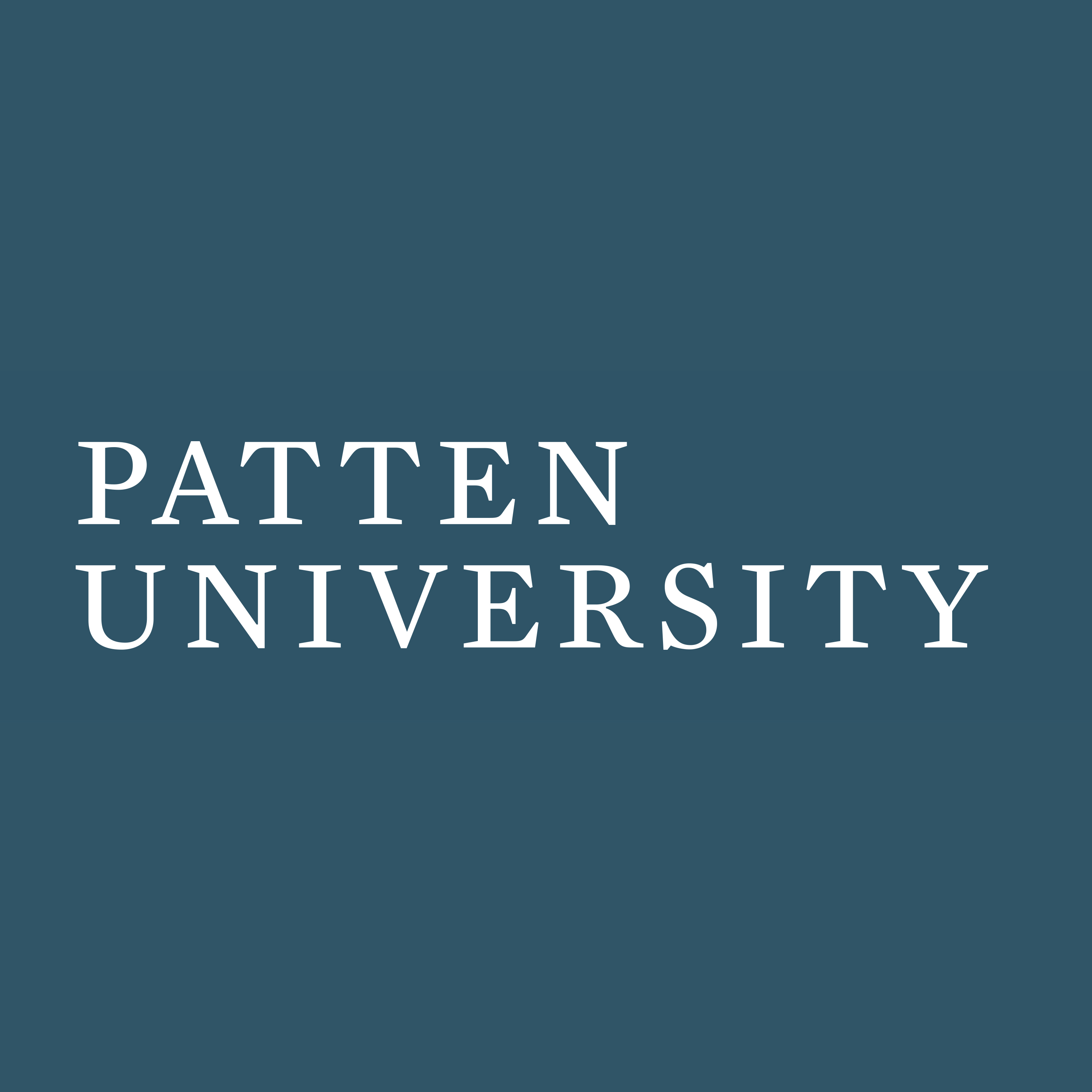
- Type: Online college
- Established: 1944
- Founders: Bebe Patten
- Students: 300
- Location: Oakland, California, United States; 37°47′11″N 122°13′10″W
- Campus: Urban, 15 acres (6.1 ha)
- Mascot: Lions
- Website: www.patten.edu

Patten University is an online college in Oakland, California. Its parent organization, Patten Educational Foundation, was founded in 1944 by Bebe Patten as a bible college, and went through several stages in its history, variously under the names Oakland Bible Institute, Patten Bible Institute, Patten College, then Patten University. It is accredited by the Distance Education Accrediting Commission.

== History ==
Founded in 1944 as the Oakland Bible Institute by Bebe Patten, Patten University emphasized faith-based teaching and created programs for students with broad academic and career interests.

The name Oakland Bible Institute was often applied to all of the Patten religious enterprises, including the Patten College and Seminary.

In December 2012, Patten began the transition from a non-profit, sectarian institution to a for-profit, secular institution under the umbrella of the parent company UniversityNow.

In 2018 the online learning platform used by Patten University was acquired by the secular nonprofit National University System.

Patten University has a partnership with the Defense Acquisition University (DAU).

== Athletics ==
The Patten athletic teams were called the Lions. The university was a member of the National Association of Intercollegiate Athletics (NAIA), primarily competing as an NAIA Independent within the Association of Independent Institutions (AII) from 2005–06 to 2011–12; and formerly in the California Pacific Conference (Cal Pac) from 1996–97 to 2004–05.

Patten competed in two intercollegiate varsity sports: Men's sports included baseball; while women's sports included softball.

The school discontinued its athletic program after the 2011–12 academic year.

== Notable alumni ==
- Wade Harper, first African-American mayor of Antioch, California
