= Urban Bird Foundation =

American bird conservation organization

- Founded: 2008
- Founder: Scott Artis
- Type: 501(c)(3) non-profit organization
- Tax ID no.: 83-0675132
- Purpose: Burrowing owl, native birds, habitat and wildlife conservation
- Location: American Canyon, California
- Region served: United States
- Method: Conservation, ecosystem restoration, education, research, collaboration, outreach
- Website: UrbanBird.org
- Formerly called: Burrowing Owl Conservation Network

Urban Bird Foundation is a United States-based, 501(c)(3) non-profit organization founded in 2008 by Scott Artis with a mission to "protect, defend, rescue and conserve bird life" in and adjacent to urban and suburban areas. Formerly named the Burrowing Owl Conservation Network, having changed its name in October 2013, it was dedicated to "the protection and restoration of burrowing owls and promoting the preservation and careful management of habitat to prevent loss, foster healthy populations, and maintain intact natural communities for an ecologically sound future." The organization is active in California political intervention aimed at burrowing owl protection, and fundraising used for conservation, education and outreach, raptor research, and advocacy. The organization's efforts include habitat protection, ecosystem restoration, collaborations with private lands owners, government agencies and non-profit organizations, and installation of artificial burrows.

The organization was originally named "Friends of East Bay Owls" and its mission was focused on protecting burrowing owls and habitat in East Bay. The organization's mission and work has expanded throughout California and North America. The organization is headquartered in American Canyon, California.

== Conservation Strategy Petition ==
While operating as Burrowing Owl Conservation Network, the organization spearheaded a 2011 statewide petition for the "immediate development, release for public comment and implementation of a Comprehensive Conservation Strategy for Burrowing Owls." This petition was a joint project with Defenders of Wildlife and was signed by 22 other California organizations representing more than 209,000 Californians.

== Earth Island Institute ==
Urban Bird Foundation was adopted by Earth Island Institute on July 24, 2010 as Burrowing Owl Conservation Network. Earth Island Institute provided the organization with fiscal sponsorship and administrative support for their grassroots efforts until 2018 when Urban Bird Foundation incorporated in California as an independent nonprofit public benefit corporation and received 501(c)(3) tax exempt status from the Internal Revenue Service.

== California Endangered Species Act Listing Petition ==
On March 5, 2024, Center for Biological Diversity, Defenders of Wildlife, Urban Bird Foundation, Burrowing Owl Preservation Society, Santa Clara Valley Audubon Society, Central Valley Bird Club and San Bernardino Valley Audubon Society filed a California Endangered Species Act listing petition with the Fish and Game Commission requesting protections for five populations of the western burrowing owl.

The filed petition seeks endangered status for burrowing owls in southwestern California, central-western California and the San Francisco Bay Area, and threatened status for burrowing owls in the Central Valley and southern desert range.
