= Gateway Generating Station =

Natural-gas-fired power station in California

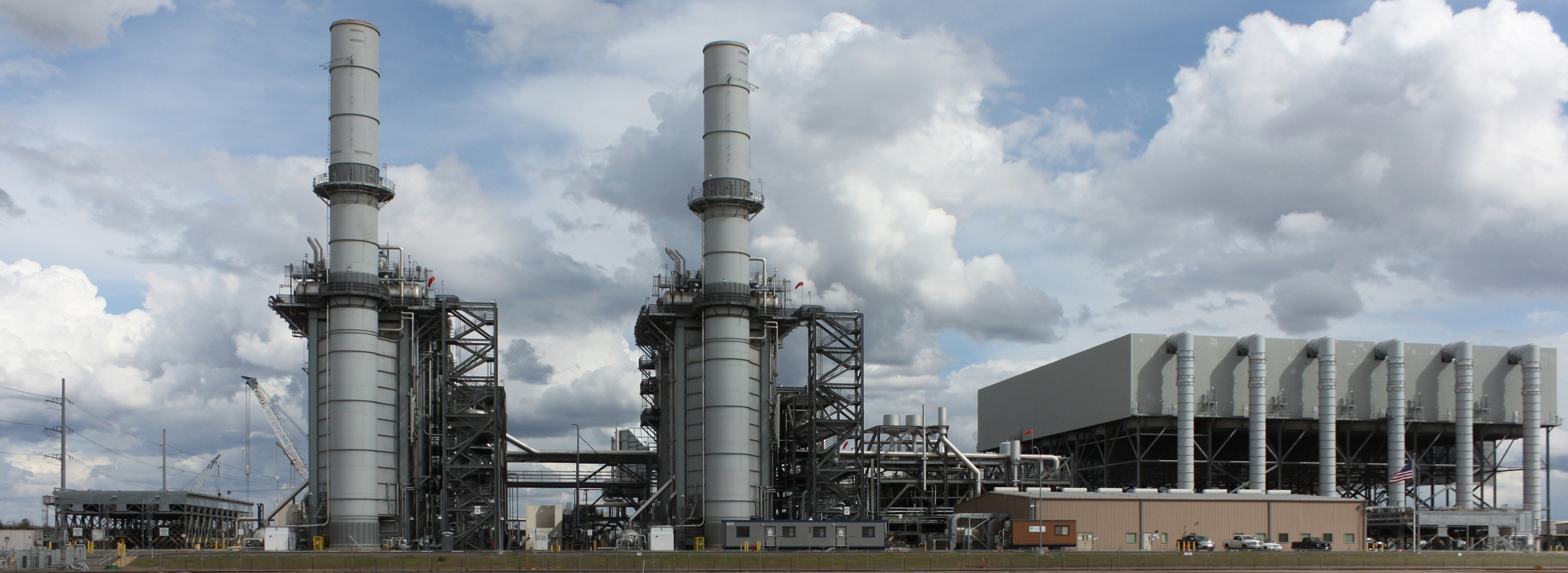
- Country: United States
- Location: 3225 Wilbur Avenue, Antioch, California
- Coordinates: 38.0175°N 121.7587°W
- Status: Operational
- Construction began: 2001
- Commission date: January 4, 2009
- Owner: Pacific Gas & Electric
- Operator: Pacific Gas & Electric

Thermal power station
- Primary fuel: Natural gas
- Cooling source: Dry
- Combined cycle?: Yes

Power generation
- Nameplate capacity: 530 MW
- Annual net output: 2,872,858 MWh

External links
- Commons: Related media on Commons

Gateway Generating Station (GGS), formerly Contra Costa Unit 8 Power Project, is a combined-cycle, natural-gas-fired power station in Contra Costa County, California, which provides power to half a million customers in northern and central California. Gateway Generating Station is on the southern shore of the San Joaquin River, in Antioch, and is one of more than ten fossil-fuel power plants in Contra Costa County.

Construction, which cost $386 million, began in 2001; the station began delivering power to customers in 2009. Its nominal capacity is 530 MW, with a peak capacity of 580 MW. It generates electricity using two combustion turbines, paired with heat recovery steam generators (HRSGs) that power one steam turbine. The facility is owned and operated by Pacific Gas and Electric Company (PG&E).

In June 2015, a lawsuit was filed against the Environmental Protection Agency to prevent the approval of the station's air-emissions permit; the suit was dismissed in October of that year. As of 2015, the only recorded injury that had ever occurred at the facility was in April 2009, when an employee tripped and chipped a tooth.

== Construction ==
A proposal to construct the facility, originally called "Contra Costa Unit 8 Power Project", was filed with the California Energy Commission by Mirant Delta (now GenOn Energy Holdings) in January 2000. The proposal was certified in May 2001, at which point construction began. However, by 2002, Mirant was experiencing financial difficulties, and construction was suspended.

In July 2005, Pacific Gas & Electric acquired the partially-constructed plant from Mirant in a settlement agreement; in 2006 it was approved as a co-owner of Unit 8, and the process of filing paperwork was resumed.

PG&E wanted to change the name of the project from "Contra Costa Unit 8 Power Project" to "Gateway Generating Station"; this name was chosen to show that the "plant represents the 'Gateway' to the future of electric power generation" and was required to file a request for this. The Energy Commission approved this request five months later. During that time, in December 2006, PG&E became the sole owner of the project.

Construction finally resumed in February 2007, making Gateway the first new plant built by PG&E in nearly twenty years. The project was expected to cost about $370 million (equivalent to $561 million in 2024), employ as many as 400 workers at its peak, involve approximately one million worker-hours, and to provide electricity to customers by 2009. The engineering, procurement, and construction of the plant were managed by Black & Veatch. It was expected that PG&E would pay approximately $1.5 million to Contra Costa County annually in property tax.

The work for underground piping and powertrain equipment included loading, setting and alignment of heavy haul items, in addition to installation of pipe supports, piping, in-line instrumentation, platforms and enclosures. This portion of the work, along with associated management cost, encompassed 152,000 direct man-hours of labor over 21 months. By July 2008, construction was "two-thirds" finished. The gas turbines were first fired in November 2008; commercial operation, supplying power to nearly 400,000 customers, began on January 4, 2009. Randy Livingston, PG&E's vice president of power generation, said to the Brentwood Press that the project came "ahead of schedule, on budget, and we had no lost-time injuries during the entire construction of the plant". The overall cost of the plant was $386 million.

== Facility ==
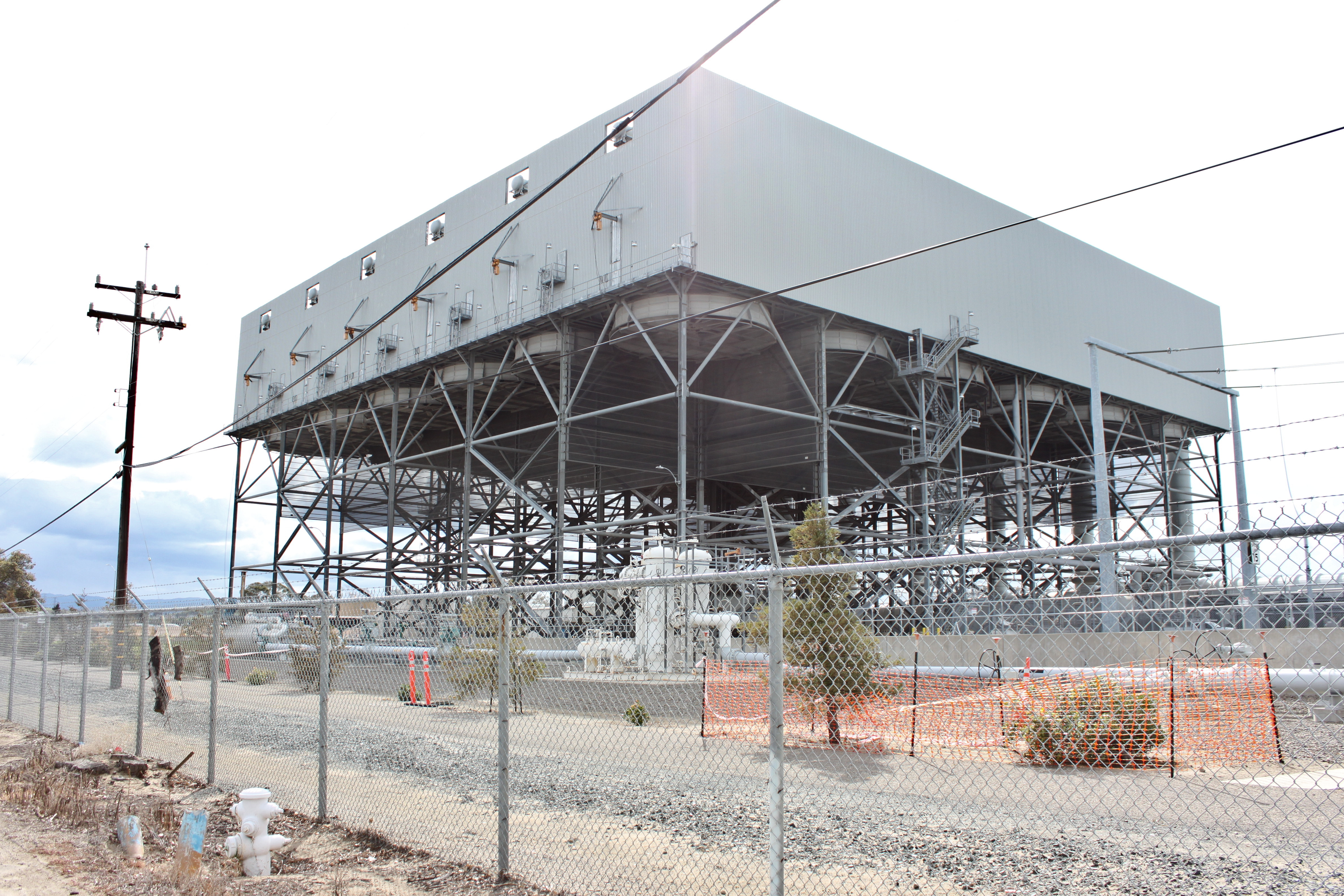
View of the air-cooled condenser. Fans and screens can be seen below the condenser tubes themselves (which are hidden behind corrugated steel walls).

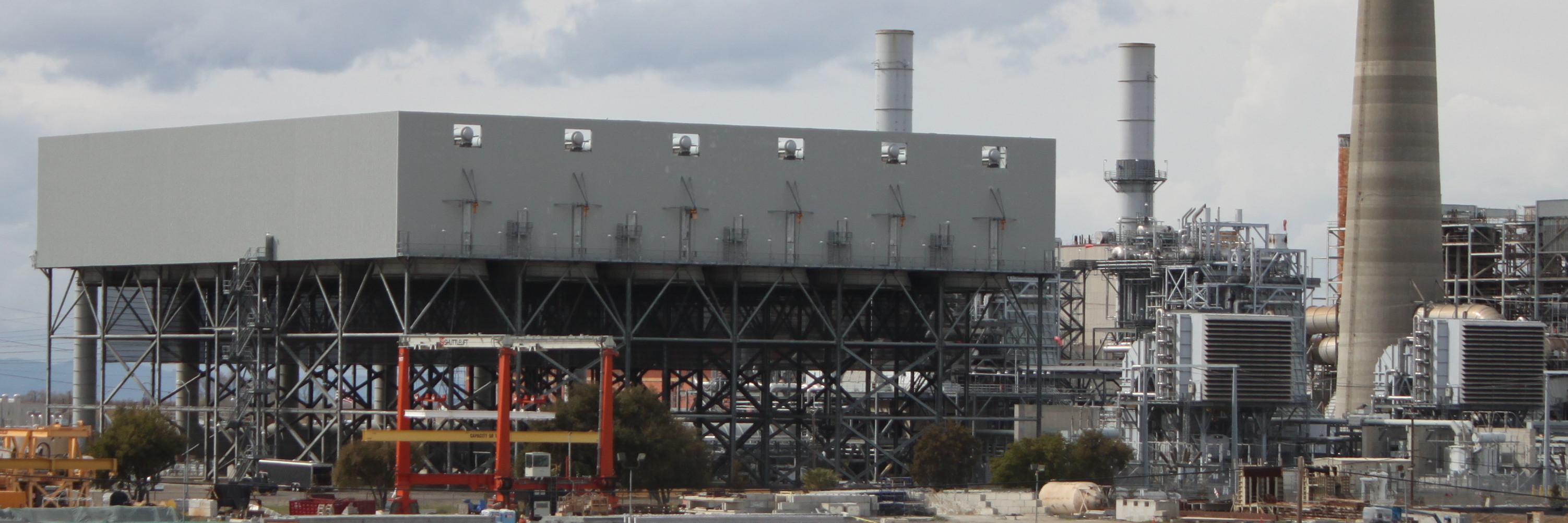
At the bottom right, the large square intake vents can be seen.

The combined-cycle facility is located at 3225 Wilbur Avenue in Antioch. While it was constructed as a nominally 530 MW facility, an additional 50 MW of low-cost peaking capability brings its overall capacity to 580 MW. The facility consists of a combustion turbine air inlet chiller system, two combustion turbines paired with heat recovery steam generators (HRSGs), one steam turbine, an air-cooled condenser system, generator step-up transformers, a plant substation, an interconnecting transmission line, an administration building, and a control building.

The combustion turbine air inlet chiller system, made by Turbine Air Systems, uses aqueous ammonia to lower the temperature of air prior to being taken into the combustion turbines. While Mirant had originally intended to use evaporative cooling for intake chilling, PG&E switched to an air-cooled design due to a desire to avoid drawing water from the nearby San Joaquin River. The system is charged with up to 18,000 gallons of aqueous ammonia solution, or 35,000 pounds (16,000 kg) of ammonia; the ammonia storage tanks are in a walled containment basin.

The combustion turbines were made by General Electric, with the model designation PG7241FA (the same as model designation 7FA.03, and the later re-designation 7F.04). Each has a capacity of 1,872,000,000 British thermal units (1.975×10^{9} kJ) per hour, and 2,227,000,000 British thermal units (2.350×10^{9} kJ) per hour when combined with the HRSG. Heat recovery, performed by two Vogt-NEM three-pressure reheat HRSGs, uses waste heat from the combustion turbines to generate steam to power an additional turbine. This steam turbine, also made by General Electric, is a model D11 tandem compound reheat double-flow steam turbine generator. The capacity of the turbine model is 240 MW; with the configuration it is installed in, Gateway's steam turbine has a nominal rating of 190 MW.

The air-cooled condenser system, made by SPX Dry Cooling (now SPG Dry Cooling), is designed for a maximum ambient temperature of 104 °F (40 °C) and back pressure of 5 inches of mercury (0.017 MPa). It consists of six "streets" of six fans each, for a total of 36 fans; each fan is operated at 4160 volts by a 250-horsepower motor. A grid of 24 vertical screens installed beneath the fans shields them from wind.

Emissions are abated by a selective catalytic reduction system using aqueous ammonia, which performs condensate hydrogen ion content (pH) control and reduction of NOx emissions. Additionally, there is an administration building and a control building, which contain the facility's control room, testing laboratories, and offices. These are both pre-engineered metal buildings, built by W. E. Lyons Construction. Upon its initial construction, the facility was described by the Brentwood Press as "big, imposing, noisy, metallic, tubular, gray, and sculpturally magnificent" but "not sexy".

== Operation ==
The station, which is one of more than ten fossil-fuel power plants in Contra Costa County, currently provides power to half a million customers in northern and central California. In its first year of operation, the plant emitted 942,028 tons of CO_{2}, 5 tons of SO_{2} and 83 tons of nitrogen oxide (NO_{x}), while consuming 17,224,258,000 cubic feet of natural gas in order to generate 2,490,205 megawatt-hours of electricity. In 2010, the Trans Bay Cable was switched on, linking San Francisco's electrical grid with distribution infrastructure in the Contra Costa County. Gateway Generating Station was one of more than ten fossil fuel plants linked to San Francisco in this project.

In June 2013, the Center for Biological Diversity submitted a legal notice of their joint intent (along with Communities for a Better Environment) to sue the Environmental Protection Agency for approving the project, claiming that its NO_{x} emissions harmed local communities and "transform[ed] the chemical composition" of the nearby Antioch Dunes, causing hardship for tens of endangered Lange's metalmark butterflies. The lawsuit was intended to cause the EPA to reject PG&E's air emissions permit for the plant. In response, PG&E said that Gateway was "state-of-the-art", and that it had entered a voluntary Safe Harbor agreement for 12 acres of its property to be used as dune habitat for the butterflies and plant species. PG&E spokeswoman Tamar Sarkissian said: "To our knowledge, we are not a party to this lawsuit". Laura Horton, staff attorney at the Wild Equity Institute, said that this was "PG&E's last chance to do the right thing". The suit was filed in June 2015; in October of that year, U.S. District Judge Phyllis J. Hamilton, of the United States District Court for the Northern District of California, dismissed the suit, pointing out numerous issues with the filing and denying Wild Equity leave to amend its complaint. In July 2017, The New York Times identified Gateway Generating Station as an "investor-owned power plant" and noted that it was represented by the Edison Electric Institute trade association.

=== Safety ===
In April 2009, an employee tripped and hit their face on a pump, chipping a tooth; as of 2015, this was the only recorded injury that had ever occurred at the station. In 2012, to avoid arc flash hazards to employees when racking in breakers, contactors, and grounding buggies, a racking system was installed which uses cameras and actuators to allow these tasks to be performed remotely. In 2014, a steam-cycle performance assessment resulted in an update of the cycle-chemistry manual, upgrade of the chemistry logging systems, and purchase of new analytical equipment.

A fall 2017 audit/inspection by Contra Costa Health Services Hazardous Materials Programs (CCHSHMP), to ensure compliance with California Accidental Release Prevention (CalARP) program requirements, found 12 corrective actions for PG&E to implement, and made 18 further recommendations. There had not been any incidents related to regulated CalARP materials in the five years prior to the audit. The CCHSHMP concluded that, while the facility had a management system in place to oversee CalARP requirements, some timelines had not been met due to changes in site leadership. They also found that the facility's incident investigation, maintenance program, safety Information program, training program and self-audit programs were implemented sufficiently, but needed to be followed on schedule and kept up to date. Current revisions of several standard operating procedures could not be accessed in the facility's document management system, but this issue was addressed during the audit.

== See also ==
- List of power stations in California
