= Dozier-Libbey Medical High School =

Location
- 4900 Sand Creek Rd; Antioch, California 94531; United States; 37.9483°N 121.7681°W

Information
- Established: 2007
- School district: Antioch Unified School District
- Principal: Blair Wilkins
- Teaching staff: 29.94 (FTE)
- Grades: 9–12
- Enrollment: 697 (2023–2024)
- Student to teacher ratio: 23.28
- Classrooms: 26
- Campus type: Fringe rural
- Colors: Blue, Green, Yellow
- Athletics: None
- Sports: None
- Mascot: Diamondback
- Accreditation: Western Association of Schools and Colleges
- Yearbook: Caduceus
- Website: www.antiochschools.net/o/dlmhs

Dozier-Libbey Medical High School is a public school located in Antioch, California, with a focus on health and medicine. The school is named for Dr. Thomas (Tom) Dozier and Dr. Joseph H. (Joe) Libbey, local physicians who practiced in the area from the 1930s through the late 1980s.

With English and science test scores that are above the state average, this school has earned awards such as the California Gold Ribbon Award and was ranked number 2,828 of all high schools in the U.S. and ranked number 393 of all high schools in California by U.S. News & World Report.
