= Taiwan Jones =

American football player (born 1988)

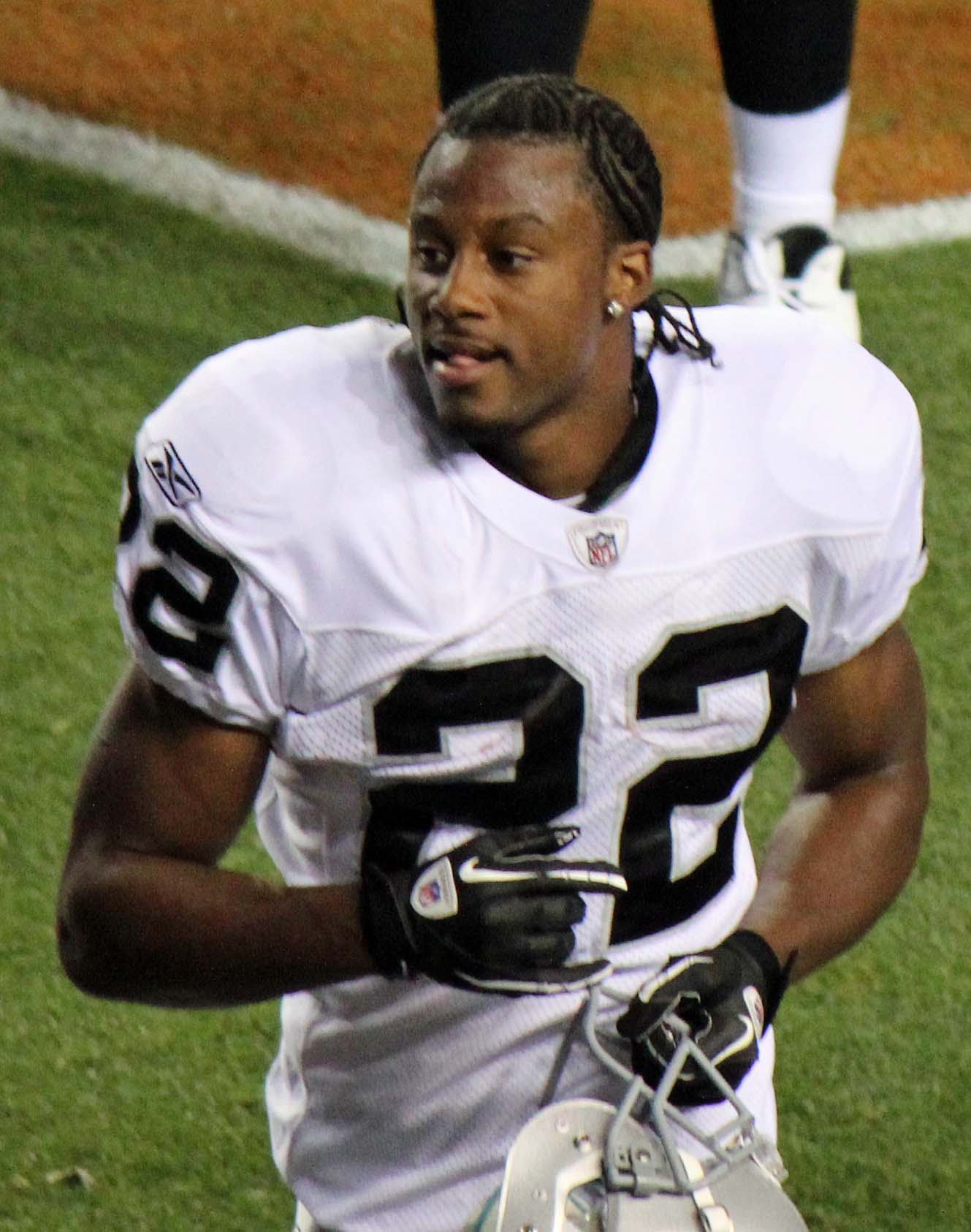
- Jones with the Oakland Raiders in 2011

No. 22, 26, 34, 25, 36
- Positions: Running back, return specialist, special teamer

Personal information
- Born: July 26, 1988 (age 38); San Francisco, California, U.S.
- Listed height: 6 ft 0 in (1.83 m)
- Listed weight: 195 lb (88 kg)

Career information
- High school: Deer Valley (Antioch, California)
- College: Eastern Washington (2007–2010)
- NFL draft: 2011: 4th round, 125th overall pick

Career history
- Oakland Raiders (2011–2016); Buffalo Bills (2017–2018); Houston Texans (2019); Buffalo Bills (2020–2022); New York Giants (2023)*
- * Offseason or practice squad member only

Awards and highlights
- FCS national champion (2010); First-team FCS All-American (2010); Big Sky Conference Co-Offensive Player of the Year (2010)

Career NFL statistics
- Total tackles: 79
- Forced fumbles: 6
- Rushing yards: 223
- Rushing average: 4.2
- Receptions: 19
- Receiving yards: 260
- Return yards: 1,906
- Total touchdowns: 1
- Stats at Pro Football Reference

Taiwan Asti Eric Jones (born July 26, 1988) is an American former professional football player who was a running back, return specialist, and special teamer in the National Football League (NFL). He played college football for the Eastern Washington Eagles and was selected by the Oakland Raiders in the fourth round of the 2011 NFL draft. During his NFL career, Jones was primarily a gunner and jammer on special teams.

== Early life ==
Born in San Francisco, Jones graduated from Deer Valley High School in Antioch, California, where he played high school football, in 2007. He was the Contra Costa Times Player of the Year and also earned first team San Francisco Chronicle All-Metro honors as a running back. Jones was also named MVP of the Bay Valley Athletic League and was his team's MVP on offense. He set his school's single season record with 19 touchdowns as a two-way starter. He rushed for 1,466 yards (9.3 yards per carry) and 13 touchdowns, and also scored three touchdowns receiving and two on punt returns. On defense, Jones had 37 tackles with a sack and three interceptions. One of his interceptions he returned for a score. He led the Wolverines to a 10–0 regular season record and their first league title.

In addition to football, he was also a standout athlete for the school's track team. At the prelims of the 2007 CIF State Track & Field Championships, he ran career-best times of 10.53 seconds in the 100 meters and 21.32 seconds in the 200 meters, placing 2nd and 7th, respectively.

== College career ==
Jones signed with Eastern Washington in 2007 as a cornerback and was redshirted. He started four games at cornerback in 2008 after missing much of the first part of the season with a broken fibula suffered in the first week of preseason practices.

In 2009, Jones was moved to running back, the position he played in high school. Jones scored on an 87-yard run on his first collegiate carry and went on to earn third team All-America honors from both the Associated Press and The Sports Network. He was also a first team All-Big Sky Conference selection. Jones finished with 1,213 rushing yards in 2009 to rank as the sixth-most in school history. He ranked in the top 10 in FCS in rushing (ninth, 101.1 yards per game), scoring (sixth, 9.50 points per game) and all-purpose yards per game (second, 195.4 yards per game). Jones's 2,345 all-purpose yards (rushing, receiving, returns) were the second-most in school history, and his 19 touchdowns and 114 total points both rank fourth. Jones also returned a kickoff 93 yards for a touchdown against Northern Colorado.

Jones finished the 2010 season with 1,742 rushing yards and 14 touchdowns during Eastern Washington's national championship season. He missed the semifinal and championship games with a broken foot suffered in the Eagles' FCS quarterfinals game against North Dakota State. During the game, Jones managed to rush for 230 yards. He was named a first team All-American and was also named the Big Sky Conference Co-Offensive Player of the Year.

After his junior season, Jones announced that he would forgo his senior season and enter the 2011 NFL draft.

== Professional career ==
Jones did not participate in the NFL Combine due to his foot injury, but he fully participated in all drills during his pro day in mid-April.

Pre-draft measurables
Height	Weight	Arm length	Hand span	Wingspan	40-yard dash	10-yard split	20-yard split	20-yard shuttle	Three-cone drill	Vertical jump	Broad jump	Bench press
5 ft 11 5/8 in (1.82 m)	194 lb (88 kg)	29 1/2 in (0.75 m)	8 3/4 in (0.22 m)	5 ft 11 3/4 in (1.82 m)	4.33 s	1.58 s	2.54 s	4.08 s	6.90 s	39.5 in (1.00 m)	11 ft 0 in (3.35 m)	13 reps
All values from NFL Combine/Pro Day

=== Oakland Raiders ===
Jones was selected by the Oakland Raiders in the fourth round (125th overall) of the 2011 NFL draft. He made his NFL debut in Week 7 against the Kansas City Chiefs, and saw action both running and receiving the ball, as well as on special teams.

In 2013, Raiders general manager Reggie McKenzie stated that Jones would switch from running back to cornerback.

On February 24, 2014, Jones and the Raiders agreed on a three-year contract extension.

At the beginning of the Raiders' 2015 offseason activities, it was announced that new head coach Jack Del Rio had switched Jones back to running back.

On July 28, 2017, Jones was released by the Raiders.

=== Buffalo Bills (first stint) ===
On August 2, 2017, Jones was signed by the Buffalo Bills. He was placed on injured reserve on November 4 after suffering a broken arm in Week 9.

On March 16, 2018, Jones re-signed with the Bills. He was named a team captain for the 2018 season for his role on special teams. Jones was placed on injured reserve on October 31 with a neck injury.

=== Houston Texans ===
On May 14, 2019, Jones signed with the Houston Texans. His 34-yard reception in overtime set up the Texans' winning field goal against the Buffalo Bills in the Wild Card Round.

=== Buffalo Bills (second stint) ===
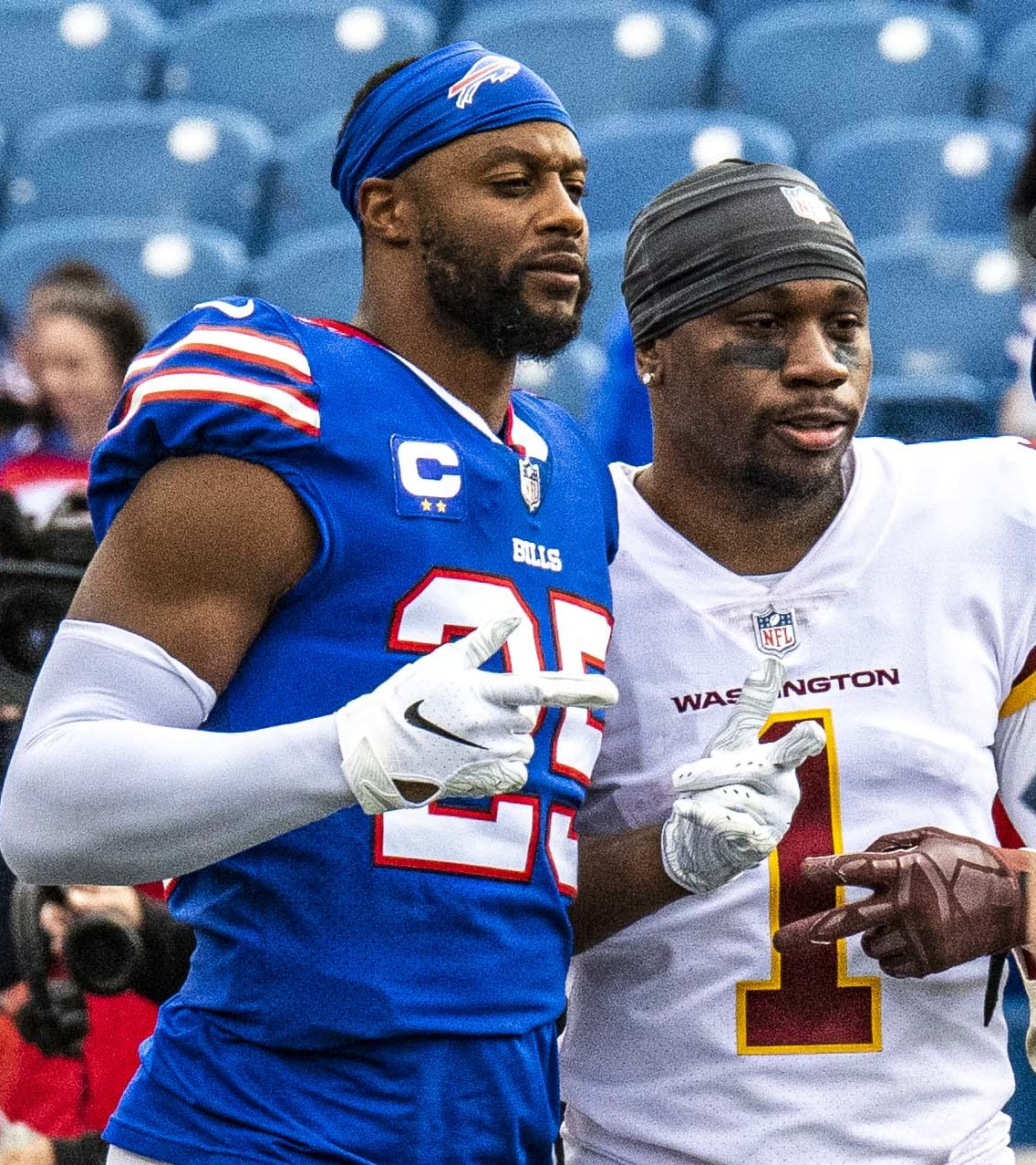
Jones (left) in 2021

Jones re-signed with the Buffalo Bills on March 30, 2020. In the AFC Championship against the Kansas City Chiefs, Jones recovered a fumble lost by wide receiver Mecole Hardman on a punt return during the 38–24 road loss.

Jones re-signed with the Bills on March 29, 2021. On April 4, 2022, Jones re-signed again with the Bills on a one-year contract.

=== New York Giants ===
On August 31, 2023, Jones was signed to the New York Giants practice squad. For Week 1 and Week 2 games against the Dallas Cowboys and Arizona Cardinals Jones was elevated from the practice squad.

Jones was released on October 3, 2023.

== NFL career statistics ==
Legend
**Bold**	Career best

=== Regular season ===
Year	Team	Games		Rushing					Receiving					Returning					Tackles			Fumbles						
Year	Team	GP	GS	Att	Yds	Y/A	Lng	TD	Rec	Yds	Y/R	Lng	TD	Ret	Yds	Y/R	Lng	TD	Cmb	Solo	Ast	FF	FR	Yds	Y/R	TD	Fum	Lost
2011	OAK	10	0	**16**	73	**4.6**	14	0	2	25	12.5	30	0	8	165	20.6	46	0	7	6	1	0	**2**	**0**	**0.0**	0	**0**	**0**
2012	OAK	14	0	6	21	3.5	7	0	2	11	5.5	7	0	2	22	11.0	16	0	12	11	1	0	**2**	-2	-1.0	0	1	**0**
2013	OAK	16	0	5	23	**4.6**	**19**	0	2	55	**27.5**	52	0	26	623	24.0	41	0	**15**	**13**	2	**1**	0	**0**	—	0	2	1
2014	OAK	1	0	0	0	—	0	0	0	0	—	0	0	0	0	—	0	0	0	0	0	0	0	**0**	—	0	**0**	**0**
2015	OAK	12	0	**16**	**74**	**4.6**	**19**	0	**7**	**106**	15.1	**59**	**1**	**31**	**829**	**26.7**	**70**	0	7	5	2	0	1	**0**	**0.0**	0	2	1
2016	OAK	13	0	1	-8	-8.0	-8	0	4	43	10.8	16	0	8	112	14.0	21	0	4	3	1	0	1	**0**	**0.0**	0	**0**	**0**
2017	BUF	8	0	0	0	—	0	0	1	11	11.0	11	0	2	50	25.0	27	0	3	3	0	0	0	**0**	—	0	**0**	**0**
2018	BUF	6	0	0	0	—	0	0	0	0	—	0	0	5	89	17.8	27	0	5	5	0	0	0	**0**	—	0	**0**	**0**
2019	HOU	11	0	9	40	4.4	11	0	1	9	9.0	9	0	0	0	—	0	0	9	4	**5**	0	0	**0**	—	0	**0**	**0**
2020	BUF	13	0	0	0	—	0	0	0	0	—	0	0	0	0	—	0	0	6	5	1	0	0	**0**	—	0	**0**	**0**
2021	BUF	**17**	0	0	0	—	0	0	0	0	—	0	0	1	14	14.0	14	0	6	4	2	0	1	**0**	**0.0**	0	**0**	**0**
2022	BUF	16	0	0	0	—	0	0	0	0	—	0	0	2	2	1.0	2	0	5	2	3	0	0	**0**	—	0	1	1
Career		137	0	53	223	4.2	19	0	19	260	13.7	59	1	85	1,906	22.4	70	0	79	61	18	1	7	-2	-0.3	0	6	3

=== Postseason ===
Year	Team	Games		Rushing					Receiving					Kick returns					Fumbles	
Year	Team	GP	GS	Att	Yds	Y/A	Lng	TD	Rec	Yds	Y/R	Lng	TD	Ret	Yds	Y/Rt	Lng	TD	Fum	Lost
2016	OAK	1	0	0	0	—	0	0	0	0	—	0	0	**1**	**23**	**23.0**	**23**	0	0	0
2019	HOU	2	0	0	0	—	0	0	**2**	**48**	**24.0**	**34**	0	0	0	—	0	0	0	0
2020	BUF	**3**	0	0	0	—	0	0	0	0	—	0	0	0	0	—	0	0	0	0
2021	BUF	2	0	0	0	—	0	0	0	0	—	0	0	0	0	—	0	0	0	0
2022	BUF	2	0	0	0	—	0	0	0	0	—	0	0	0	0	—	0	0	0	0
Career		10	0	0	0	—	0	0	2	48	24.0	34	0	1	23	23.0	23	0	0	0
