= Sterling Moore =

American football player (born 1990)

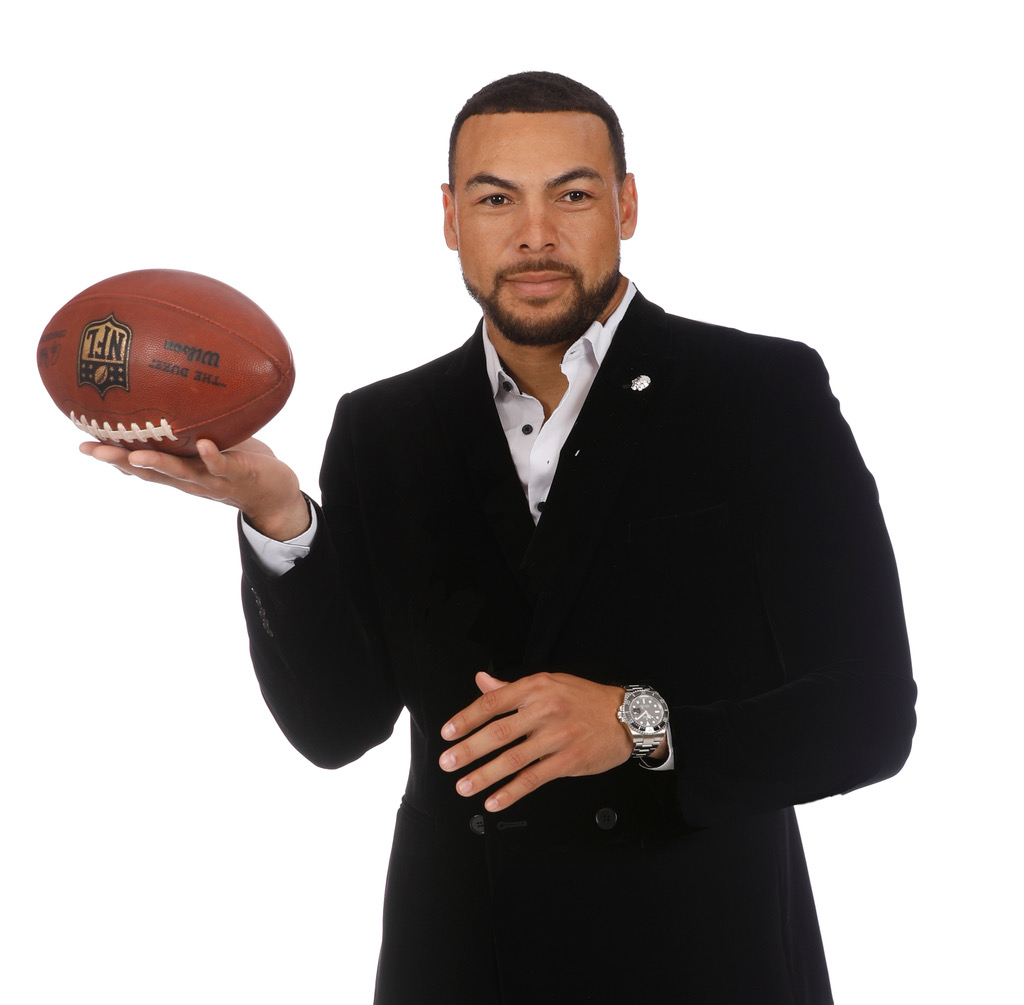
- Sterling Moore

No. 29, 30, 26, 24
- Position: Defensive assistant

Personal information
- Born: February 3, 1990 (age 36); Antioch, California, U.S.
- Listed height: 5 ft 10 in (1.78 m)
- Listed weight: 200 lb (91 kg)

Career information
- High school: Deer Valley (Antioch)
- College: Southern Methodist
- NFL draft: 2011: undrafted

Career history

Playing
- Oakland Raiders (2011)*; New England Patriots (2011–2012); Dallas Cowboys (2012–2014); Tampa Bay Buccaneers (2015); Buffalo Bills (2016)*; New Orleans Saints (2016–2017); Detroit Lions (2018)*; Arizona Hotshots (2019)
- * Offseason or practice squad member only

Coaching
- New Orleans Saints (2022–2023) Defensive assistant

Career NFL statistics
- Total tackles: 186
- Forced fumbles: 6
- Fumble recoveries: 3
- Pass deflections: 40
- Interceptions: 6
- Defensive touchdowns: 1
- Stats at Pro Football Reference

Sterling Moore (born February 3, 1990) is an American former professional football cornerback and coach who most recently served as a defensive assistant for the New Orleans Saints of the National Football League (NFL). He played college football at Southern Methodist University.

== Early life ==
Moore attended Deer Valley High School, where he played as a wide receiver and defensive back. He also practiced basketball.

He then played at Los Medanos College before moving on to Laney College, where he became a starter at cornerback, appearing in 10 games as a freshman, while making 30 tackles, five interceptions, 9 passes defensed and one forced fumble. The next year, he received All-JUCO honors.

After his sophomore season, he transferred to Southern Methodist University. He finished his college career after appearing in 19 games, while posting 59 tackles, 2 interceptions, 18 passes defensed, 2 sacks and one fumble recovery.

== Professional career ==
=== Oakland Raiders ===
On July 28, 2011, he was signed by the Oakland Raiders as an undrafted free agent. He was waived on September 3 and re-signed the next day to the practice squad. He was released on September 26.

=== New England Patriots ===
On October 5, 2011, Moore was signed by the New England Patriots to their practice squad. On October 15, he was signed to the active roster and made his NFL debut against the New York Jets on November 13, starting every snap at safety for the Patriots. On December 10, Moore was released by New England. On December 14, he was re-signed to the Patriots' practice squad and on December 23, he was promoted to the active roster. In the team's Week 17 game on January 1, 2012, Moore recorded two interceptions against the Buffalo Bills, returning one for a touchdown. Late in the AFC Championship against the Baltimore Ravens, as the Ravens were driving toward a potential game clinching touchdown, Moore struck Lee Evans' arm on a pass to the end zone, almost certainly preventing a touchdown that could have sent the Ravens to Super Bowl XLVI. After the incomplete pass, Billy Cundiff missed a game-tying field goal as the Patriots went on to win 23–20, earning for Moore an AFC Championship ring.

On October 31, 2012, Moore was waived by New England; he was re-signed to the team's practice squad two days later.

=== Dallas Cowboys ===
On November 30, 2012, Moore was signed by the Dallas Cowboys off of the Patriots' practice squad to replace an injured Orlando Scandrick. He played in the last five games of the season, mostly in passing situations.

Moore was released by Dallas on August 31, 2013, in favor of rookie fourth-round draft choice B. W. Webb. The team brought Moore back on November 25, to play as the fourth corner in passing situations.

In 2014, having been mostly relegated to a reserve role during his career, Moore was named the team's nickel back during Orlando Scandrick's suspension and kept the role after Morris Claiborne suffered a season-ending knee injury. He played in 16 games (including seven starts), registering 49 tackles and leading all Cowboys defensive backs with 14 passes defensed.

=== Tampa Bay Buccaneers ===
On March 19, 2015, Moore signed with the Tampa Bay Buccaneers. He was used as the nickel cornerback in the first four games of the season, before being passed on the depth chart by Alterraun Verner and moved to a backup role. Moore was named the starting left cornerback in the seventh game of the season and logged eight starts, before coming off of the bench in the season finale. He finished the campaign with 45 tackles, one interception, six passes defended, and three forced fumbles.

=== Buffalo Bills ===
Moore signed with the Buffalo Bills on April 5, 2016. On September 2, he was released as a part of final roster cuts.

=== New Orleans Saints ===
On September 6, 2016, Moore was signed by the New Orleans Saints to replace Cortland Finnegan, who had been released. He played in 13 games (including 12 starts) for the Saints, recording career-highs in tackles (56) and passes defended (13), paired with two interceptions.

On March 23, 2017, Moore re-signed with the Saints. With the emergence of their younger cornerbacks, the Saints released Moore on October 25. He was re-signed on November 20, but was released again on December 14. Moore was once again re-signed by New Orleans on December 21.

=== Detroit Lions ===
On August 20, 2018, Moore signed with the Detroit Lions. He was released by the Lions on August 31.

=== Arizona Hotshots ===
Moore was signed by the Arizona Hotshots of the Alliance of American Football on January 17, 2019. The league ceased operations in April 2019.

In October 2019, Moore was selected by the Seattle Dragons in the 10th round during phase 4 of the 2020 XFL draft.

== NFL career statistics ==
Legend
**Bold**	Career high

=== Regular season ===
Year	Team	Games		Tackles					Interceptions					Fumbles			
Year	Team	GP	GS	Cmb	Solo	Ast	Sck	TFL	Int	Yds	TD	Lng	PD	FF	FR	Yds	TD
2011	NWE	6	3	7	6	1	0.0	0	**2**	**26**	**1**	**21**	2	0	0	0	0
2012	NWE	8	0	13	12	1	0.0	0	0	0	0	0	1	1	1	14	0
2012	DAL	5	0	9	6	3	0.0	0	0	0	0	0	1	0	0	0	0
2013	DAL	5	0	5	5	0	0.0	0	1	21	0	**21**	3	0	0	0	0
2014	DAL	**16**	7	46	35	11	0.0	1	0	0	0	0	12	1	**2**	**17**	0
2015	TAM	**16**	9	45	37	8	0.0	**3**	1	18	0	18	6	**3**	0	0	0
2016	NOR	13	**12**	**56**	**44**	**12**	0.0	1	**2**	8	0	8	**13**	0	0	0	0
2017	NOR	6	0	5	5	0	0.0	0	0	0	0	0	2	1	0	0	0
		75	31	186	150	36	0.0	5	6	73	1	21	40	6	3	31	0

=== Playoffs ===
Year	Team	Games		Tackles					Interceptions					Fumbles			
Year	Team	GP	GS	Cmb	Solo	Ast	Sck	TFL	Int	Yds	TD	Lng	PD	FF	FR	Yds	TD
2011	NWE	**3**	0	**7**	**6**	**1**	0.0	0	0	0	0	0	**6**	0	0	0	0
2014	DAL	2	**2**	4	4	0	0.0	0	0	0	0	0	0	0	0	0	0
2017	NOR	2	0	0	0	0	0.0	0	0	0	0	0	0	0	0	0	0
		7	2	11	10	1	0.0	0	0	0	0	0	6	0	0	0	0

== Coaching career ==
=== New Orleans Saints ===
On March 10, 2022, Moore joined the New Orleans Saints coaching staff as a defensive assistant.
