= Antioch Airport (California) =

Airport in Antioch, California, 1941–1980s

- IATA: none; ICAO: none

Summary
- Airport type: Private
- Location: Antioch, California
- Opened: 1941
- Closed: 1989
- Time zone: PST (-6:00)
  - Summer (DST): PDT (-7:00)
- Coordinates: 37.964750°N 121.801280°W
- Interactive map of Antioch Airport

Antioch Airport was an airport located in Antioch, California that was closed in 1989.

== Ownership ==
Gerald Sander Graham once owned the old Antioch Airport. He was a convict who had been incarcerated in 1960 and 1968 of child molestation and pedophilia. He was also accused of molesting his daughter, and threatening other girls.

== History ==
A new Civil Air Patrol headquarters building at Antioch Airport was built by volunteers in 1954.

In the late 1970s, the airport was one of several candidates considered by the Contra Costa County government for use as a reliever for busy Buchanan Field in Concord. Antioch Airport permanently closed on June 30, 1989; it was among the last in the eastern San Francisco Bay Area to lack an air traffic control tower. The airport's hangars were purchased by the county government and moved to the new Byron Airport.

Houses have been built where the airport once occupied.
