= Wade Harper =

American politician

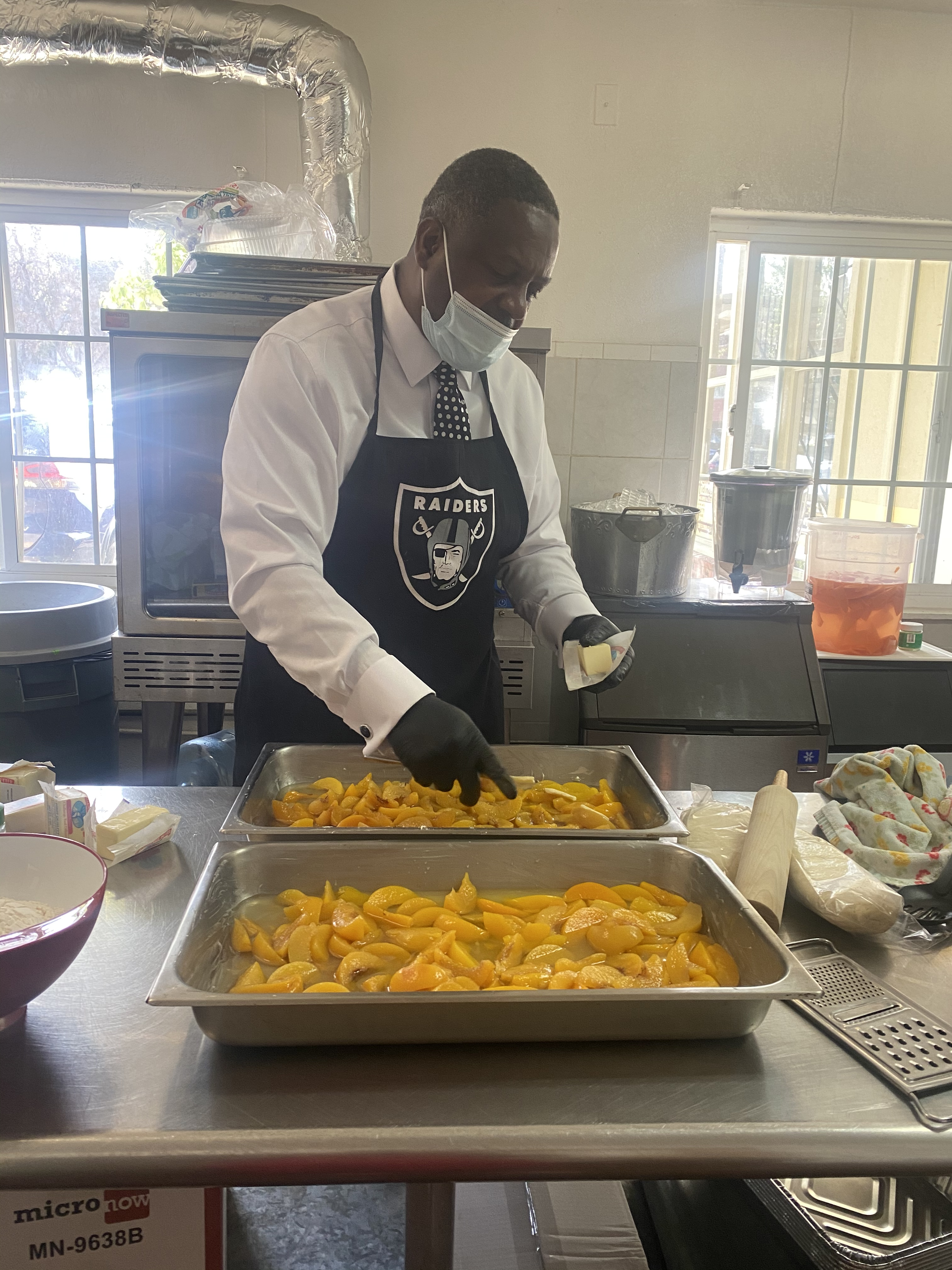
- Harper baking for charity volunteers

Mayor of Antioch, California
- In office 2012–2016
- Preceded by: James Davis
- Succeeded by: Sean Wright

Personal details
- Born: 1963 or 1964 (age 61–62)
- Spouse: Lisa Harper
- Children: 2
- Education: B.A. Patten University; M.B.A. John F. Kennedy University

Wade Harper (born 1963/1964) is an American politician, the former mayor of Antioch, California. He is the first African American to be elected as mayor in the city of Antioch.

== Biography ==
Harper was born and raised in Oakland, California, the youngest of three children. His mother was a single mom who remarried a Vietnam veteran who gave him a disciplined upbringing. In 1988, Harper accepted a position as a police dispatcher in Emeryville, California later rising to the rank of sergeant and then in 2005, as a police officer in Tracy, California. rising to the rank of lieutenant. He graduated with a B.A. in pastoral studies from Patten University and an M.B.A. from John F. Kennedy University. In 2001, he moved to Antioch. In 2009, he was appointed to the Antioch Unified School District’s Board of Trustees. In 2010, he won a 4-year term on the City Council, the second African-American to serve on the council after Reggie Moore, who was elected in 2006 reflecting Antioch's growing Black population which had increased from 10% in 2000 to 17% in 2010. In 2012, running on a zero tolerance platform, he won election as mayor succeeding James Davis. He was the first African-American mayor of Antioch in its 162 year history. As the mayorship, unlike the City Council, was a full-time position, he also retired from his job as a police lieutenant in Tracy. In January 2015, an unsuccessful recall effort was launched against him due to concerns over the still high levels of violent and property crime. In the November 8, 2016 general election, he was narrowly defeated for re-election by a margin of 67 votes by Sean Wright.

== Personal life ==
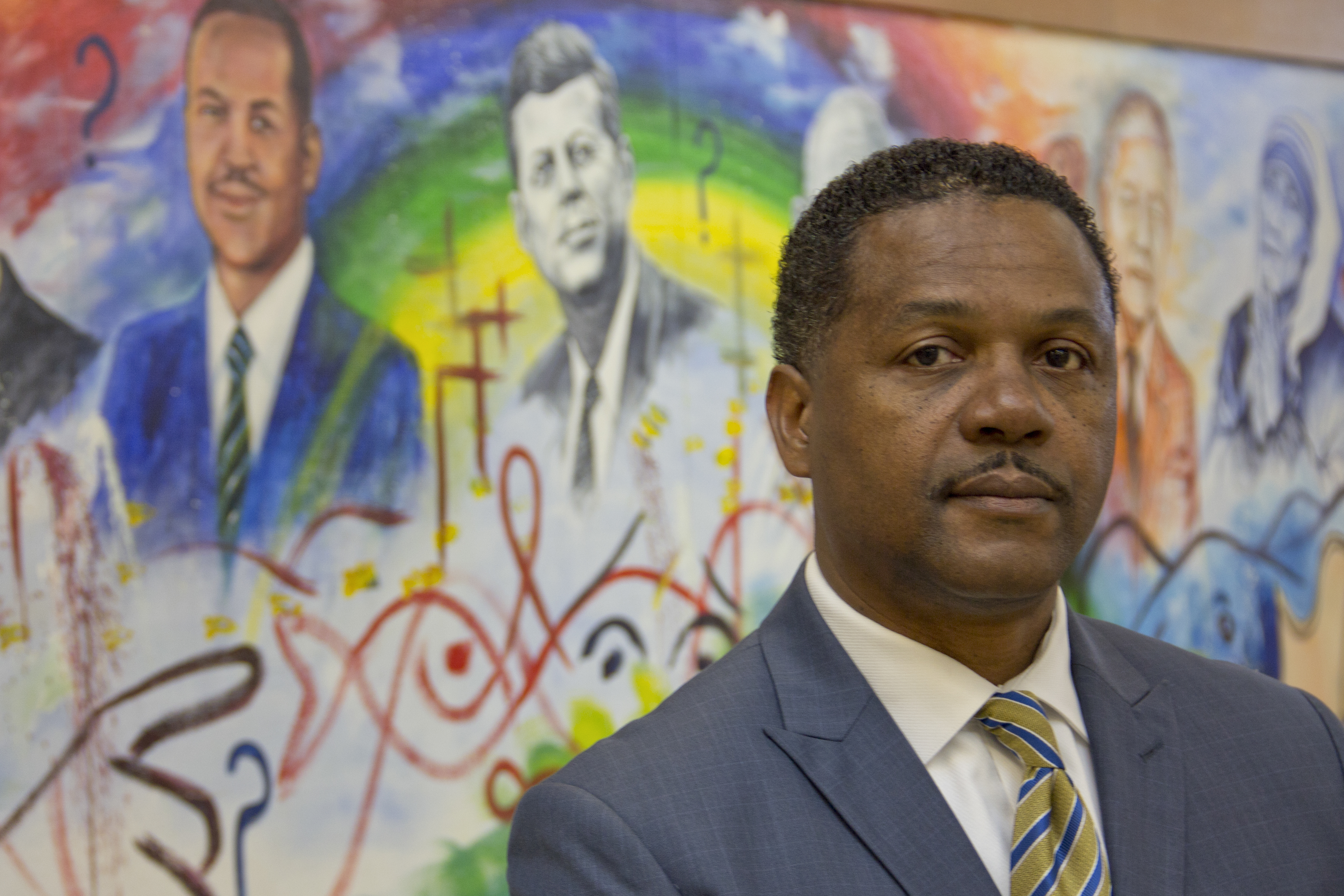
Mayor Wade Harper honored with mural at Antioch High School

Harper is an anointed preacher. He is married to Lisa Harper; they have two children. Wade Harper is a published author. He published his first book in 2018, “Anointed for Leadership: Lessons from Law Enforcement and Pastoral Ministry.” He published his second book in 2021 entitled, “Keep Antioch Beautiful.”

In November of 2020 Wade accepted a position as CEO of a non-profit, Glad Tidings Community Development Corporation in Hayward, CA.

== See also ==
- List of first African-American mayors
- African American mayors in California

Preceded by James Davis	Mayor of Antioch, California; 2012–2016	Succeeded by Sean Wright
