= Antioch, California =

City in California, United States

- City
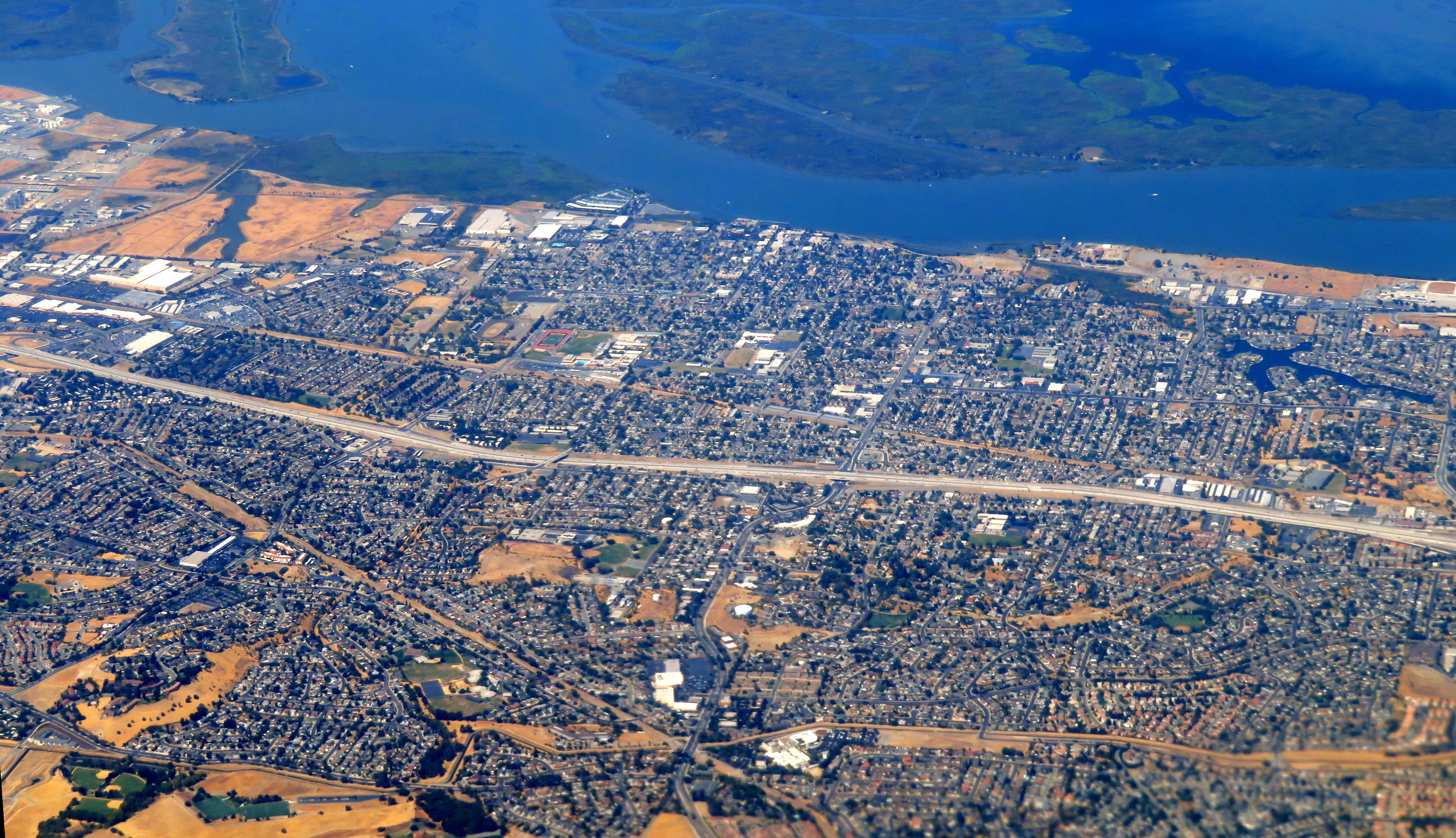
- View of Antioch

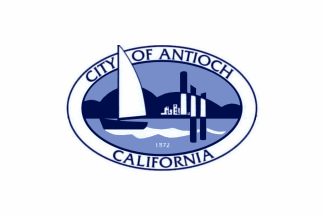
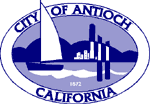
- Flag Seal Logo
- Motto: Opportunity Lives Here
- Interactive map of Antioch, California
- Location in California Antioch (the United States)
- Coordinates: 38°00′18″N 121°48′21″W
- Country: United States
- State: California
- County: Contra Costa
- Incorporated: February 6, 1872

Government
  - Mayor: Ron Bernal
  - State senator: Tim Grayson (D)
  - Assembly member: Anamarie Avila Farias (D)
  - United States representatives: John Garamendi (D) and Mark DeSaulnier (D)

Area
  - City: 29.94 sq mi (77.55 km^{2})
  - Land: 29.17 sq mi (75.55 km^{2})
  - Water: 0.77 sq mi (2.00 km^{2}) 2.52%
- Elevation: 43 ft (13 m)

Population (2026)
  - City: 119,688
  - Rank: 3rd in Contra Costa County; 55th in California
  - Density: 3,952.2/sq mi (1,525.96/km^{2})
  - Urban: 326,205 (US: 124th)
  - Urban density: 4,448/sq mi (1,717.2/km^{2})
  - Metro: 7,468,390
- Time zone: UTC−8 (Pacific)
  - Summer (DST): UTC−7 (PDT)
- ZIP codes: 94509, 94531
- Area code: 925
- FIPS code: 06-02252
- GNIS feature IDs: 1657936, 2409715
- Website: www.antiochca.gov

Antioch is the third-most populous city in Contra Costa County, California, United States. The city is located in the East Bay region of the San Francisco Bay Area along the Sacramento–San Joaquin River Delta. The city's population was 115,291 at the 2020 census. The city has grown substantially more diverse since the 1970s.

== History ==
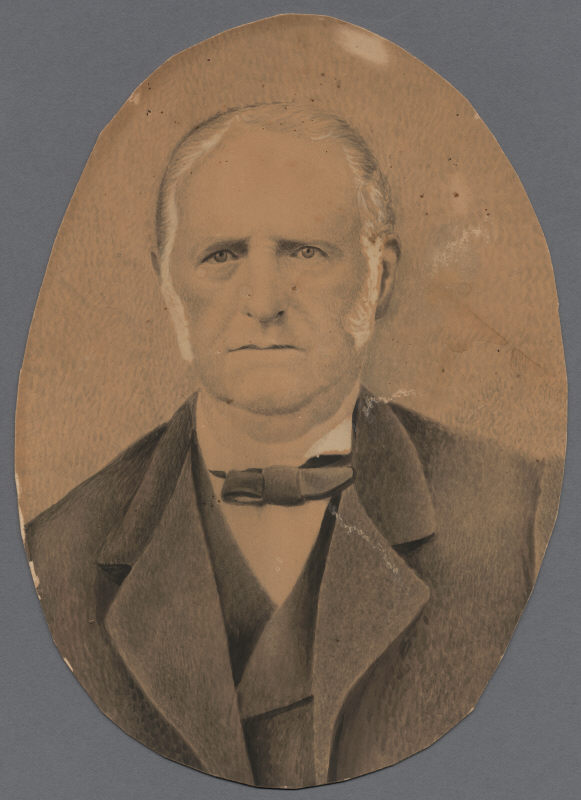
Don José Noriega, a wealthy Californio ranchero, was granted Rancho Los Méganos in 1835.

=== Early history ===
Antioch is one of the oldest towns in the region. The town has been variously named East Antioch, Smith's Landing, and Marsh's Landing, prior to its current name.

In 1848, John Marsh, owner of Rancho Los Méganos, one of the largest ranches in California, built a landing on the San Joaquin River in what is now Antioch. It became known as Marsh's Landing, and was the shipping point for the 17,000-acre (69 km^{2}) rancho. It included a pier extending well out into the river, enabling vessels drawing 15 feet (4.6 m) of water to tie up there in any season of the year. The landing also included a slaughterhouse, a smokehouse for curing hams, rodeo grounds, and a 1 1/2-story dwelling, embellished with fretwork, that was brought around the Horn to serve as a home for the mayordomo and his wife.

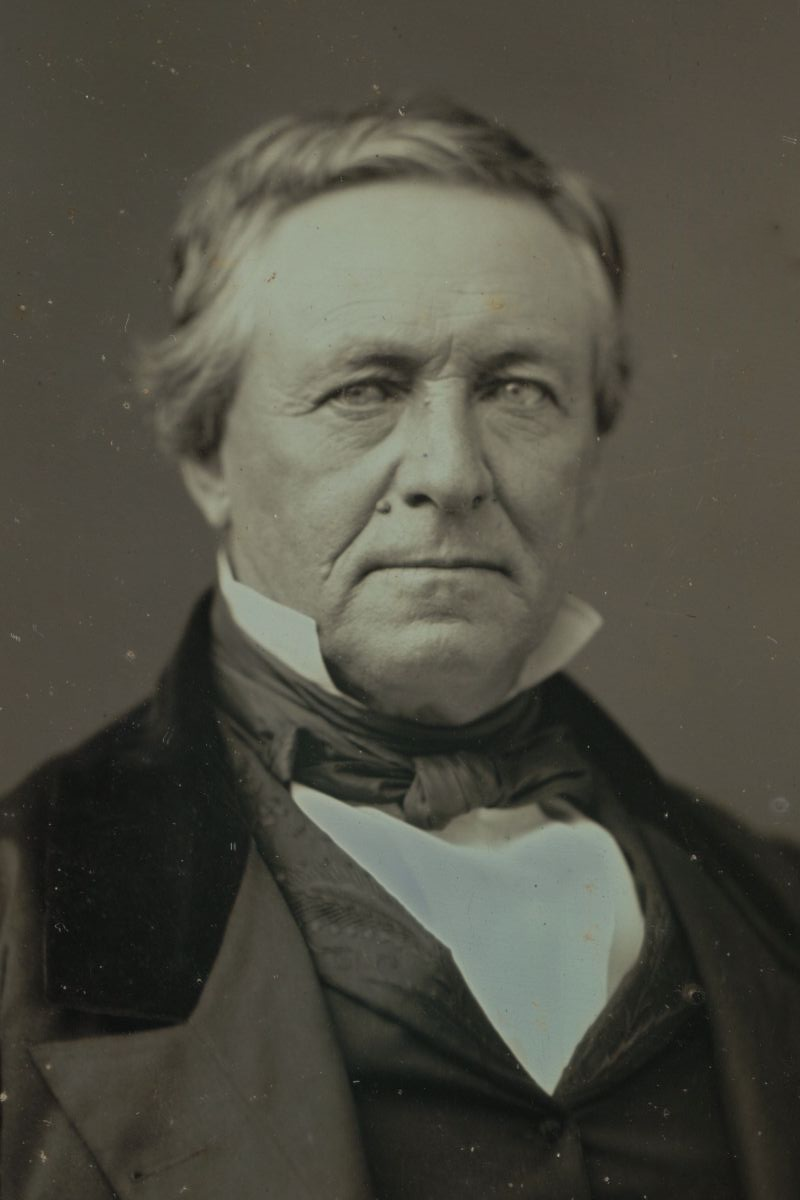
John Marsh in 1852

In 1849, twin brothers Rev. William Wiggins Smith and Rev. Joseph Horton Smith sailed from Boston, purchased land from John Marsh and founded a town slightly west of Marsh's Landing, and named it Smith's Landing. During the town picnic on July 4, 1851, William, the town's new minister, persuaded the residents to change the name of the town to Antioch, for the biblical city of Antioch, "in as much as the first settlers were disciples of Christ, and one of them had died and was buried on the land, that it be given a Bible name in his honor, and suggested 'Antioch' (an ancient Syrian town where two important rivers meet and where the followers of Christ were first called Christians), and by united acclamation it was so christened."

Around 1859, coal was discovered in several places in the hills south of Antioch, and coal mining formed the first substantial business apart from farming and dairying for the inhabitants of this community. This new industry resulted in the founding of the towns of Nortonville, Somersville, Stewartville, and Black Diamond (now Pittsburg), and added greatly to the economic activity of the Antioch area. The Empire Coal Company was formed by John C. Rouse and George Hawxhurst in 1876, which built a railroad that passed from Antioch toward the mines over what is now "F Street" (formerly Kimball Street). However, later on, both the mine and the railroad passed into the hands of the Belshaw brothers. The mines have long since ceased operation, and the railroad tracks have been dug up, though the building that served as the Antioch terminus of the railroad still stands on the corner of F Street and Fourth Street, and the grading and trestles still remain much as they were in those early days.

In 1863, a great excitement arose over the discovery of copper ore near Antioch. Smelting works were built at Antioch, and the ore fetched $15 to $25 per ton. The copper bubble eventually burst, to the dismay of the citizens, and petroleum was first drilled for near Antioch in 1865, but not enough oil was found to make a decent profit.

The Antioch Post Office was opened in 1851, closed in 1852, reopened in 1855, closed again in 1862, and has operated continuously since reopening in 1863. The city of Antioch was incorporated in 1872.

The city's historic Chinese community, which was forcibly segregated, was estimated to number in the hundreds in the late 1800s. The city's early history included banning Chinese residents from walking the streets after sundown. In 1876, the Chinatown was burned down due to arson; the fire department refused to put out the fire. For nearly 100 years, virtually no Chinese lived in Antioch. The 1960 census showed that only 12 residents were Chinese.

Antioch is mainly a bedroom community, with most adults working in larger cities toward Oakland and San Francisco. The town has grown in the last 30 years, as the population of the Bay Area continues to grow, and real estate prices force families to move towards the outskirts of the Bay Area.

=== 21st century ===
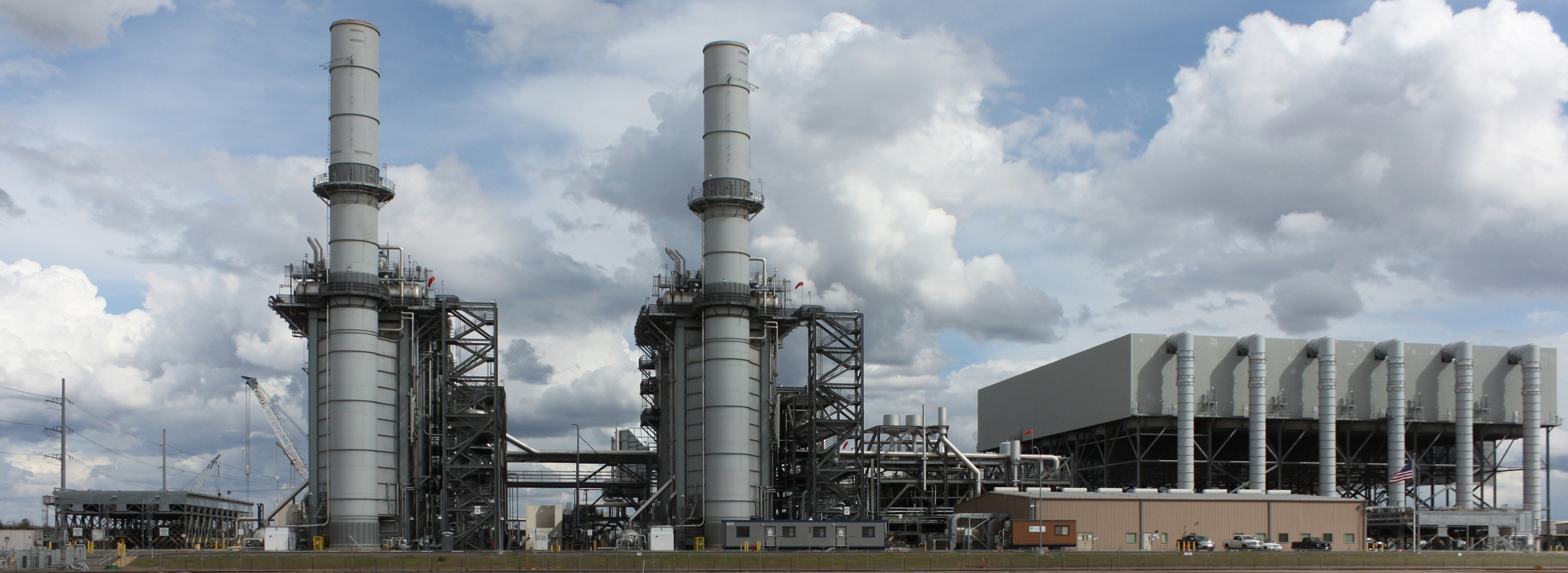
Gateway Generating Station, a combined-cycle gas-fired power station that began operation in 2009

In January 2001, the Antioch Press was established by publisher and former Antioch Mayor Pro Tem and Councilman Allen Payton; he sold it in 2005 to the Brentwood Press and Publishing Company. Between 2001 and 2008, Gateway Generating Station was constructed in northern Antioch; the 530MW combined-cycle natural gas-fired power station, owned and operated by Pacific Gas & Electric, began providing power to customers in January 2009.

In late 2009, Antioch received significant media attention following the news of kidnap victim Jaycee Lee Dugard being discovered near the city limits, and became the focus of several news stories regarding its 1,000 registered sex offenders. The Los Angeles Times ran a story titled "Sex offenders move to Antioch area 'because they can'," The Independent ran a story titled "How Jessica's Law turned Antioch into a paedophile ghetto", and CNN's Anderson Cooper and Larry King both did similar stories for television; the latter with commentary by TV judge Judy Sheindlin. However, the Contra Costa Times and affiliated newspapers contradicted their claim: "Disturbing, if true. Only it's not, according to a Bay Area News Group analysis of sex offender addresses and census data." The report concluded that the 94509 zip code ranked only 39th in the state with 1.5 sex offenders per 1,000, with Oakland, San Francisco, San Jose, Bethel Island and Vallejo ZIP codes ranked in the top ten. Monte Rio ranked first with 4.5 per 1,000.

The city was attempting in 2012 to annex an adjacent 678-acre area of unincorporated land, which includes a GenOn Energy 760-megawatt power plant, to include the plant within city limits. In October 2010, Allen Payton returned to the news business and established the Antioch Herald, first online, then in May 2011 he began publishing a monthly print edition.

Increasingly tied to the greater economy of the San Francisco Bay Area, a Bay Area Rapid Transit (BART) station opened in the city in May 2018.

Mayor Lamar Thorpe announced on April 14, 2021, that the city would establish a Chinatown historic district in the downtown and acknowledge the city's racist past.

== Geography ==
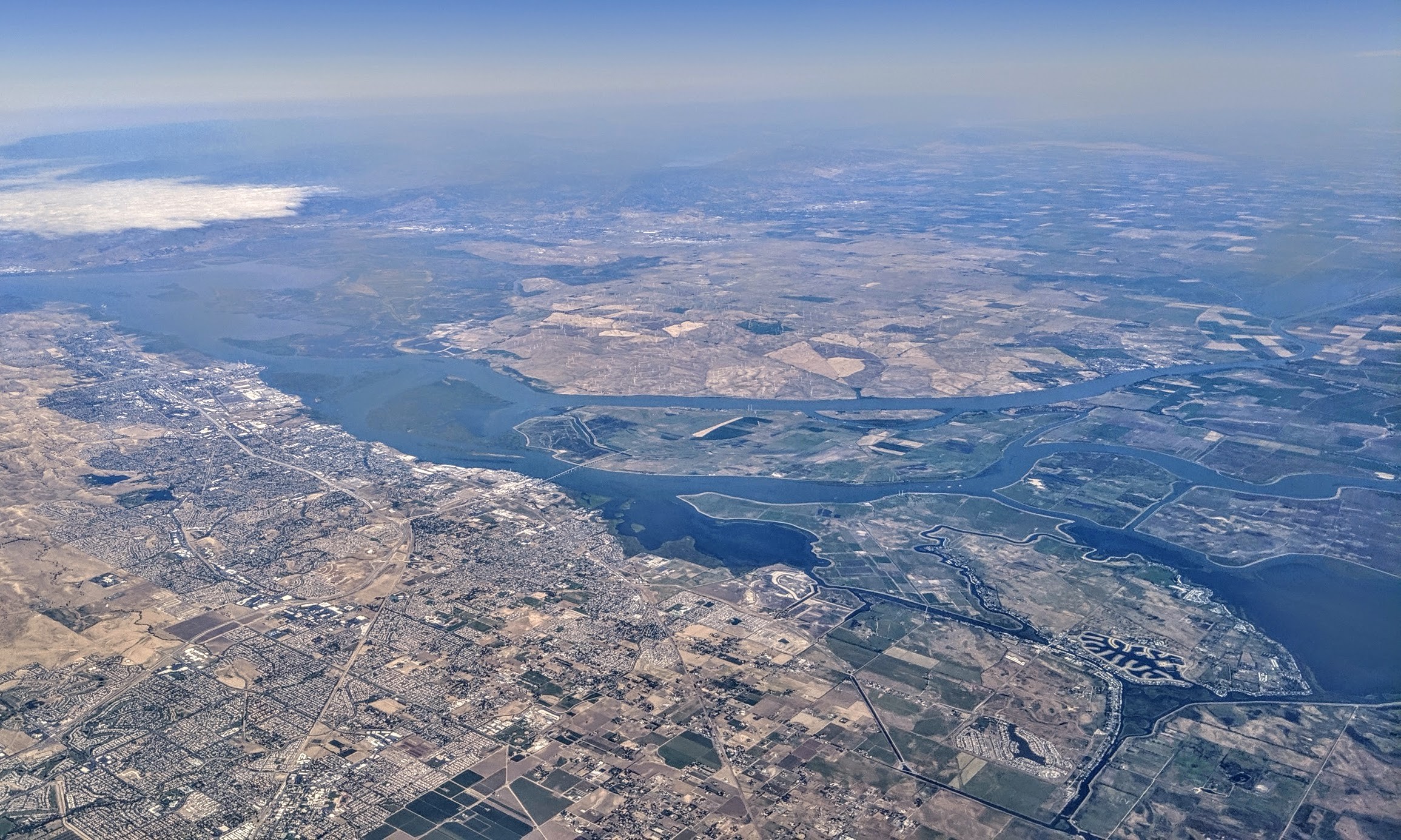
Aerial view of the confluence of the San Joaquin and Sacramento RIvers, with Antioch on the near shore of the former

Antioch is located along the San Joaquin River–Stockton Deepwater Shipping Channel at the western end of the San Joaquin–Sacramento River Delta.

According to the United States Census Bureau, the city has a total area of 29.9 square miles (77 km^{2}), of which 29.2 square miles (76 km^{2}) is land and 0.8 square miles (2 km^{2}), comprising 2.57%, is water.

=== Climate ===
Antioch has a semi-arid climate (Köppen climate classification: BSk) with hot, dry summers, and mild winters with modest rainfall. There is a considerably higher degree of diurnal temperature variation in the summer than in the winter. Antioch's inland location lying in the border of the Central Valley and Bay Area results in hotter temperatures in the summer and colder nights in the winter in contrast to the rest of the Bay Area. However, its location on the delta allows for a slight maritime effect allowing for day time highs to be a few degrees cooler than the neighboring valley cities.

Climate data for Antioch, California (1991–2020 normals, extremes 1955–2021)
Month	Jan	Feb	Mar	Apr	May	Jun	Jul	Aug	Sep	Oct	Nov	Dec	Year
Record high °F (°C)	79 (26)	79 (26)	88 (31)	94 (34)	104 (40)	117 (47)	110 (43)	109 (43)	109 (43)	102 (39)	87 (31)	75 (24)	117 (47)
Mean maximum °F (°C)	65.7 (18.7)	70.2 (21.2)	76.7 (24.8)	86.5 (30.3)	92.9 (33.8)	101.6 (38.7)	103.3 (39.6)	101.5 (38.6)	98.8 (37.1)	90.1 (32.3)	76.8 (24.9)	66.2 (19.0)	105.6 (40.9)
Mean daily maximum °F (°C)	54.0 (12.2)	60.3 (15.7)	65.5 (18.6)	71.6 (22.0)	78.6 (25.9)	86.1 (30.1)	91.1 (32.8)	89.9 (32.2)	86.3 (30.2)	77.4 (25.2)	64.4 (18.0)	54.9 (12.7)	73.3 (22.9)
Daily mean °F (°C)	45.6 (7.6)	50.6 (10.3)	54.5 (12.5)	58.9 (14.9)	65.1 (18.4)	71.1 (21.7)	74.4 (23.6)	73.4 (23.0)	70.8 (21.6)	63.8 (17.7)	53.7 (12.1)	46.2 (7.9)	60.7 (15.9)
Mean daily minimum °F (°C)	37.1 (2.8)	41.0 (5.0)	43.4 (6.3)	46.4 (8.0)	51.4 (10.8)	56.3 (13.5)	57.6 (14.2)	56.9 (13.8)	55.3 (12.9)	50.3 (10.2)	43.1 (6.2)	37.4 (3.0)	48.0 (8.9)
Mean minimum °F (°C)	30.7 (−0.7)	35.5 (1.9)	38.7 (3.7)	41.5 (5.3)	46.4 (8.0)	50.7 (10.4)	53.8 (12.1)	54.0 (12.2)	51.3 (10.7)	45.1 (7.3)	35.8 (2.1)	30.9 (−0.6)	28.6 (−1.9)
Record low °F (°C)	20 (−7)	25 (−4)	27 (−3)	28 (−2)	32 (0)	35 (2)	41 (5)	43 (6)	41 (5)	28 (−2)	24 (−4)	18 (−8)	18 (−8)
Average precipitation inches (mm)	2.78 (71)	2.43 (62)	2.00 (51)	0.90 (23)	0.36 (9.1)	0.09 (2.3)	0.02 (0.51)	0.04 (1.0)	0.18 (4.6)	0.64 (16)	1.58 (40)	2.20 (56)	13.22 (336)
Average precipitation days (≥ 0.01 in)	10	9	9	5	2	1	0	0	1	2	6	9	55
Source 1: NOAA
Source 2: XMACIS2

== Demographics ==
Historical population
Census	Pop.	Note	%±
1870	700		—
1880	626		−10.6%
1890	635		1.4%
1900	674		6.1%
1910	1,124		66.8%
1920	1,936		72.2%
1930	3,563		84.0%
1940	5,106		43.3%
1950	11,051		116.4%
1960	17,305		56.6%
1970	28,060		62.1%
1980	42,683		52.1%
1990	62,195		45.7%
2000	90,532		45.6%
2010	102,372		13.1%
2020	115,291		12.6%
2025 (est.)	118,958	▲	3.2%

Antioch, California – Racial and ethnic composition Note: the US Census treats Hispanic/Latino as an ethnic category. This table excludes Latinos from the racial categories and assigns them to a separate category. Hispanics/Latinos may be of any race.
Race / Ethnicity (NH = Non-Hispanic)	Pop 2000	Pop 2010	Pop 2020	% 2000	% 2010	% 2020
White alone (NH)	50,644	36,490	26,554	55.94%	35.64%	23.03%
Black or African American alone (NH)	8,551	17,045	23,721	9.45%	16.65%	20.18%
Native American or Alaska Native alone (NH)	513	455	419	0.57%	0.44%	0.36%
Asian alone (NH)	6,510	10,322	14,570	7.19%	10.08%	12.64%
Native Hawaiian or Pacific Islander alone (NH)	310	743	1,437	0.34%	0.73%	1.25%
Other race alone (NH)	178	251	825	0.20%	0.25%	0.72%
Mixed race or Multiracial (NH)	3,802	4,630	6,250	4.20%	4.52%	5.42%
Hispanic or Latino (any race)	20,024	32,436	41,965	22.12%	31.68%	36.40%
Total	90,532	102,372	115,291	100.00%	100.00%	100.00%

=== 2020 ===
The 2020 United States census reported that Antioch had a population of 115,291. The population density was 3,952.2 inhabitants per square mile (1,526.0/km^{2}). The racial makeup of Antioch was 28.4% White, 20.9% African American, 1.5% Native American, 13.0% Asian, 1.3% Pacific Islander, 20.8% from other races, and 14.1% from two or more races. Hispanic or Latino of any race were 36.4% of the population.

The census reported that 99.4% of the population lived in households, 0.4% lived in non-institutionalized group quarters, and 0.2% were institutionalized.

There were 35,548 households, out of which 39.7% included children under the age of 18, 48.9% were married-couple households, 7.3% were cohabiting couple households, 27.4% had a female householder with no partner present, and 16.4% had a male householder with no partner present. 17.0% of households were one person, and 7.2% were one person aged 65 or older. The average household size was 3.22. There were 27,524 families (77.4% of all households).

The age distribution was 24.3% under the age of 18, 10.0% aged 18 to 24, 26.7% aged 25 to 44, 26.0% aged 45 to 64, and 13.0% who were 65 years of age or older. The median age was 36.2 years. For every 100 females, there were 94.8 males.

There were 36,749 housing units at an average density of 1,259.8 units per square mile (486.4 units/km^{2}), of which 35,548 (96.7%) were occupied. Of these, 60.3% were owner-occupied, and 39.7% were occupied by renters.

In 2023, the US Census Bureau estimated that 23.8% of the population were foreign-born. Of all people aged 5 or older, 62.8% spoke only English at home, 23.8% spoke Spanish, 3.6% spoke other Indo-European languages, 9.1% spoke Asian or Pacific Islander languages, and 0.7% spoke other languages. Of those aged 25 or older, 85.2% were high school graduates and 23.9% had a bachelor's degree.

The median household income in 2023 was $94,256, and the per capita income was $40,337. About 8.4% of families and 11.2% of the population were below the poverty line.

=== 2010 ===
The 2010 United States census reported that Antioch had a population of 102,372. The population density was 3,520.0 inhabitants per square mile (1,359.1/km^{2}). The racial makeup of Antioch was 50,083 (48.9%) White, 17,667 (17.3%) African American, 887 (0.9%) Native American, 10,709 (10.5%) Asian (5.7% Filipino, 1.4% Chinese, 0.9% Indian, 0.7% Vietnamese, 0.2% Korean, 0.2% Japanese, 0.1% Laotian, 0.1% Pakistani, 0.1% Cambodian), 817 (0.8%) Pacific Islander, 14,310 (14.0%) from other races, and 7,899 (7.7%) from two or more races. Hispanic or Latino of any race were 32,436 persons (31.7%); 22.6% of Antioch is Mexican, 2.2% Salvadoran, 1.2% Nicaraguan, 1.2% Puerto Rican, 0.7% Peruvian, 0.4% Guatemalan, and 0.2% Cuban.

The Census reported that 101,708 people (99.4% of the population) lived in households, 404 (0.4%) lived in non-institutionalized group quarters, and 260 (0.3%) were institutionalized.

There were 32,252 households, out of which 14,664 (45.5%) had children under the age of 18 living in them, 17,010 (52.7%) were opposite-sex married couples living together, 5,718 (17.7%) had a female householder with no husband present, 2,295 (7.1%) had a male householder with no wife present. There were 2,384 (7.4%) unmarried opposite-sex partnerships, and 306 (0.9%) same-sex married couples or partnerships. 5,296 households (16.4%) were made up of individuals, and 1,781 (5.5%) had someone living alone who was 65 years of age or older. The average household size was 3.15. There were 25,023 families (77.6% of all households); the average family size was 3.52.

The population was spread out, with 28,807 people (28.1%) under the age of 18, 10,593 people (10.3%) aged 18 to 24, 27,459 people (26.8%) aged 25 to 44, 26,515 people (25.9%) aged 45 to 64, and 8,998 people (8.8%) who were 65 years of age or older. The median age was 33.8 years. For every 100 females, there were 94.8 males. For every 100 females age 18 and over, there were 91.7 males.

There were 34,849 housing units at an average density of 1,198.3 units per square mile (462.7 units/km^{2}), of which 32,252 were occupied, of which 20,751 (64.3%) were owner-occupied, and 11,501 (35.7%) were occupied by renters. The homeowner vacancy rate was 2.7%; the rental vacancy rate was 8.2%. 64,284 people (62.8% of the population) lived in owner-occupied housing units and 37,424 people (36.6%) lived in rental housing units.

== Economy ==
=== Top employers ===
According to the city's 2024 Annual Comprehensive Financial Report, the top employers in the city are:

#	Employer	# of Employees
1	Kaiser Permanente	2,720
2	Antioch Unified School District	2,190
3	Sutter Delta Medical Center	972
4	City of Antioch	316
5	Costco	292
6	Walmart	225
7	Target	220
8	Contra Costa County Social Services	220
9	Antioch Auto Center	213
10	Safeway	123

== Arts and culture ==
Antioch has four Historic Places or Buildings on the National Register of Historic Places: the Black Diamond Mines, Roswell Butler Hard House, Riverview Union High School Building and the Shannon-Williamson Ranch.

El Campanil Theatre

The historic El Campanil Theatre opened on November 1, 1928, in downtown Antioch. It now presents a wide variety of entertainment opportunities, including classic films, live theatre, concerts, symphony, ballet, comedy and is host to numerous local dance and community-based organizations, such as the Antioch Rivertown Theatre Group.

The Arts & Cultural Foundation of Antioch organizes education in graphic arts, sculpture, pottery, and performance arts for various age groups. It also hosts the Saturday Summer Concert Series, Delta Blues Festival, and Holiday De Lights, along with other community events.

Run by the Antioch Historical Society, the Antioch Historical Society Museum is in the Riverview Union High School Building. This high school was the first high school constructed in Contra Costa County.

The Lynn House Gallery houses exhibits throughout the year, with an emphasis on providing opportunities for local artists.

Rivertown Art Center is housed in a historic bank building built in 1923. It is administered by the Arts & Cultural Foundation of Antioch and was created to allow local artists additional opportunities to exhibit their art and to conduct art classes.

The ESPACE Academy is located within Deer Valley High School and includes a planetarium.

The Contra Costa County Fairgrounds are located in Antioch. The fairgrounds hosted the first two editions of the Genesis Super Smash Bros. tournament.

== Parks and recreation ==
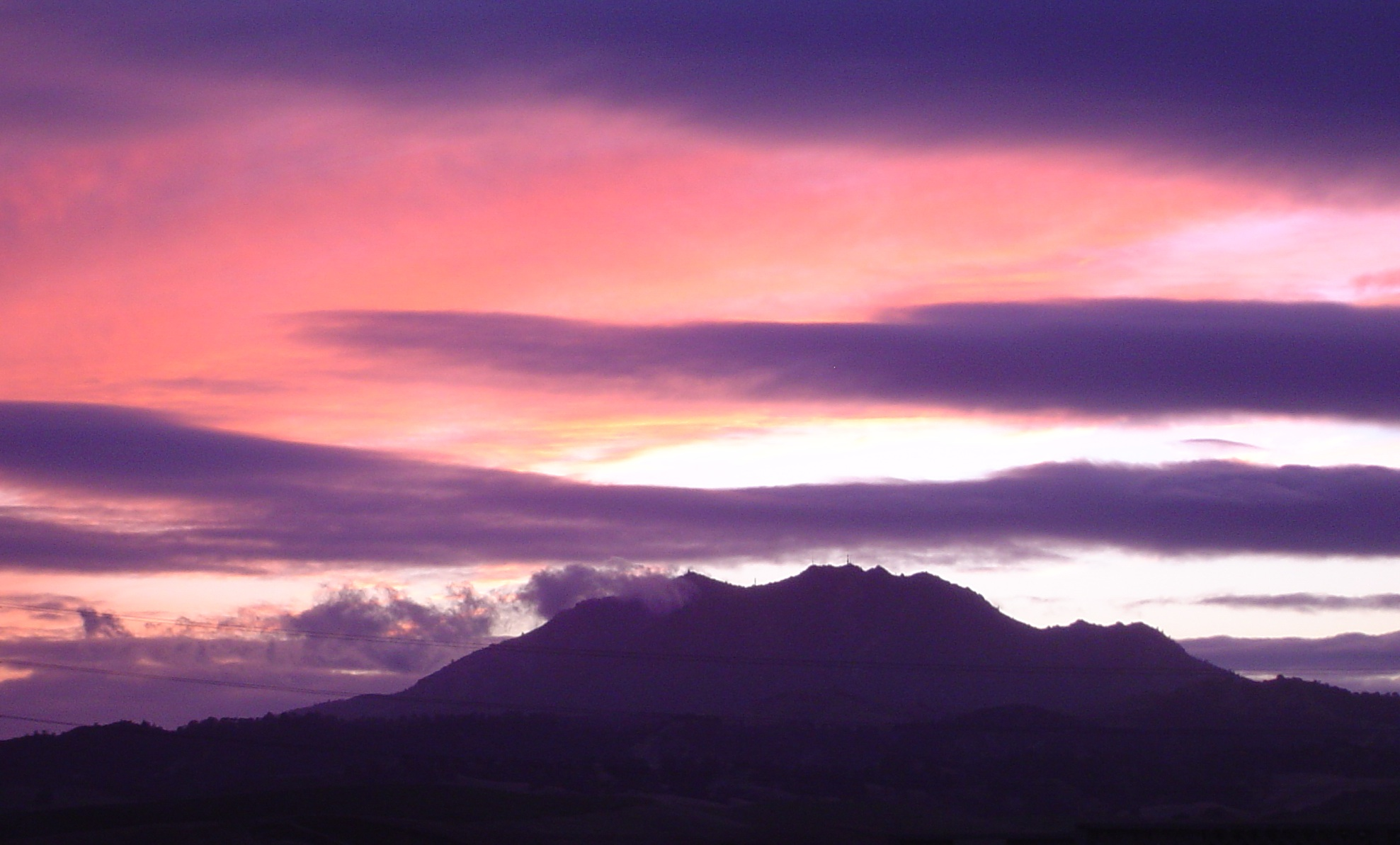
Sunset over Mt. Diablo as seen from Antioch

=== Parks and trails ===
Antioch is home to 31 parks covering a total of 310 acres (130 ha) with an additional 600 acres (240 ha) of city-owned open space. It also has 11 miles (18 km) of walking paths connecting communities to parks and schools.

Within its boundaries it has Contra Loma Regional Park, the Antioch/Oakley Regional Shoreline and Black Diamond Mines Regional Park, and the Mokelumne Coast to Crest Trail and Delta de Anza Regional Trail. According to the East Bay Regional Parks District, these three parks take up 6,493 acres (2,628 ha), approximately 38% of Antioch's total land area. Just outside Antioch city limits is the 2,024-acre (819 ha) Round Valley Regional Preserve.

Established in 1980, Antioch Dunes National Wildlife Refuge was the first national wildlife refuge in the country established for the purpose of protecting endangered plants and insects, specifically the Apodemia mormo langei known by the common name Lange's metalmark butterfly, Antioch Dunes evening primrose, and Contra Costa wallflower. It is located on the south shore of the San Joaquin River in Antioch. The refuge and a few acres of surrounding lands contain most of the remaining habitat for these three species and are all that remain of a 5.6-mile stretch (9 km) of sand dunes formed during glaciation periods.

The city has a municipal marina, along with other private marinas, boatyards, and yacht clubs. There is a public fishing pier in town, and another on the San Joaquin River along the Antioch/Oakley Regional Shoreline out near the Antioch Bridge.

=== Burrowing owl protection ===
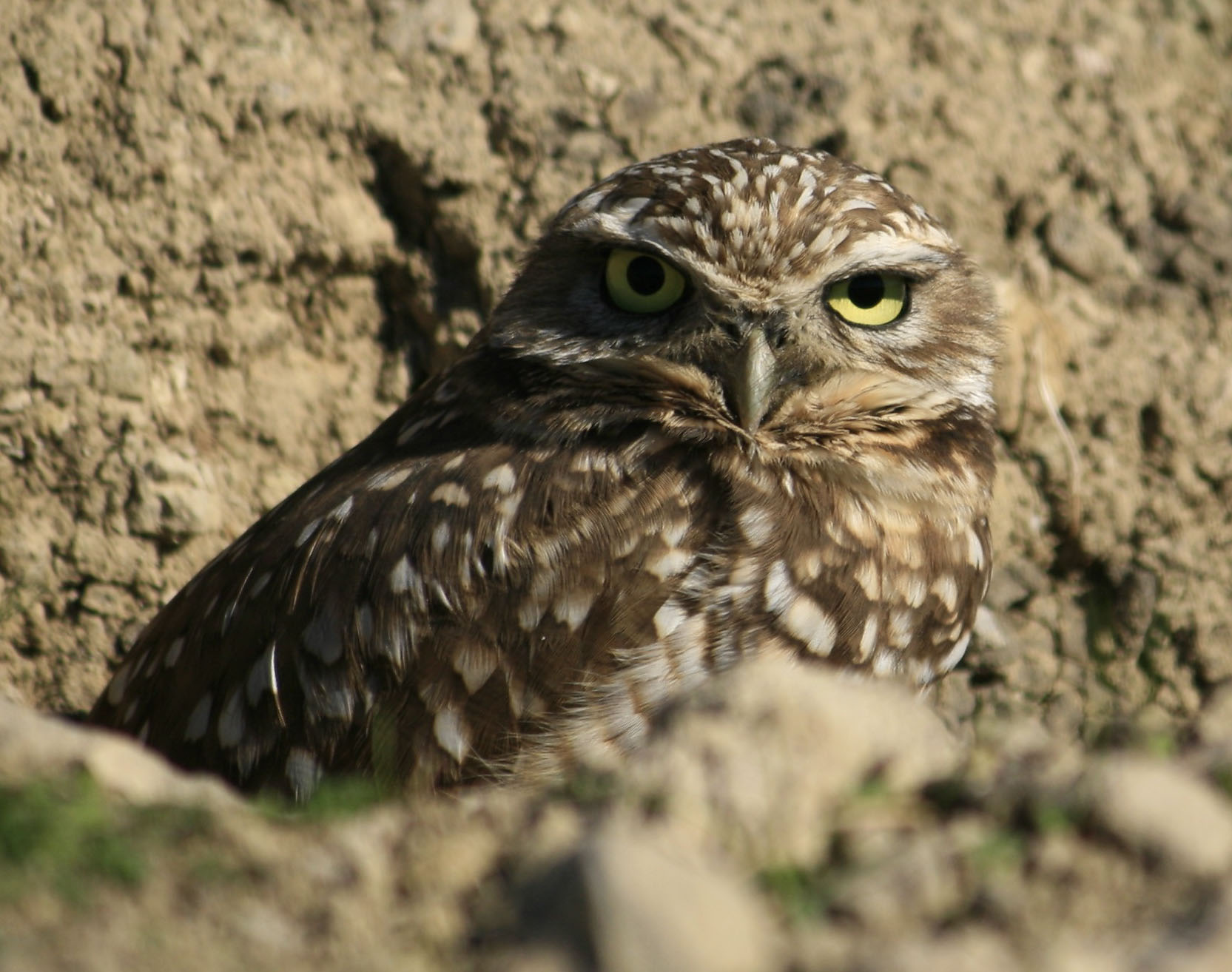
Threatened burrowing owl in Antioch

In late 2008, western burrowing owls (Athene cunicularia) moved into a 25-acre (10 ha) housing development slated for construction. In November 2009 the California Department of Fish & Game gave the developer permission to evict the owls before nesting season begins in February 2010. The birds regularly reuse burrows for years, and there is no requirement that suitable new habitat be found for the owls. Despite being listed as a Species of Special Concern (a pre-listing category under the Endangered Species Act) by the California Department of Fish and Game in 1979, California's population declined 60 percent from the 1980s to the early 1990s, and continues to decline at roughly 8 percent per year. In 1994, the U.S. Fish and Wildlife Service nominated the western burrowing owl as a federal Category 2 candidate for listing as endangered or threatened, but loss of habitat continues due to development of the flat, grassy lands used by the owl. According to The Institute for Bird Populations, there has been a 50 percent decline in burrowing owl populations in the Bay Area in the last 10 to 15 years. Their status protects them from disturbance during nesting season or killing at any time, but does not guarantee them a permanent home, as outside of breeding season, owls can be removed. In November 2009, a local resident tallied 11 owls in the area, including four pairs. Antioch is the first East Bay city to designate habitat protected by deed for burrowing owls, since residents pushed for protections for those displaced by the community center at Prewett Park. Despite organized protests at Kiper Homes' Blue Ridge property by Friends of East Bay Owls, one-way doors were installed in the birds' burrows so that the owl families could not return to their nests. A 1992–1993 survey reported no breeding burrowing owls in Napa, Marin, and San Francisco counties, and only a few in San Mateo and Sonoma. The Santa Clara County population is declining and restricted to a few breeding locations, leaving only Alameda, Contra Costa, and Solano counties as the remnant breeding range. To assist the displaced Antioch owls in finding new homes a group of local residents and the environmental group Friends of Marsh Creek Watershed constructed six artificial burrows at a designated burrowing owl habitat preserve in the hills north of Prewett Water Park.

== Government ==
=== City Council ===
As of 2025, Antioch's City Council consists of:

- Mayor (at-large) Ron Bernal
- District 1: Tamisha Torres-Walker
- District 2: Louie Rocha (Mayor pro tempore)
- District 3: Don Freitas
- District 4: Monica E. Wilson

The following people have been elected Mayor of Antioch since the city's incorporation:

	James Donlon	1920–1938
	William "Bill" R. Beasley Jr.	1950–1954
	Ruben R. Reimche	1955–1958
	Jack C. Smith	1959–1960
	Pete Lopez	1967–1968
	Louise Giersch	1970–1971
	Nick Rodriguez Jr.	1971–1972
	Barney Parsons	1973–1974
	Fred Kline	1974–1975
	Louise Giersch	1975
	Verne Roberts	1976–1978
	Joel Keller	1984–1994
	Len Herendeen	1995–1996
	Mary Helen Rocha	1996–2000
	Don P. Freitas	2000–2008
	James D. Davis	2008–2012
	Wade Harper	2012–2016
	Sean Wright	2016–2020
	Lamar Thorpe	2020–2024
Ron Bernal, Mayor of Antioch	Ron Bernal	2025–present

Antioch maintains a council–manager form of government with a Mayor elected at-large, who serves as chair of the council and is elected in years divisible by four, and four Councilmembers elected in district elections. Districts 1 and 4 elect their Councilmembers in years divisible by four, while districts 2 and 3 elect their Councilmembers in even-numbered years not divisible by four. Antioch historically elected its Councilmembers in at-large elections, but in response to threats of a lawsuit alleging violations of state law and underrepresentation of people of color, the Antioch City Council voted to switch to district elections in 2018, holding the first such elections in 2020.

=== Public safety ===
The city is protected by Contra Costa Fire and the Antioch Police Department.

=== Politics ===
According to the California Secretary of State, as of February 10, 2019, Antioch has 54,528 registered voters. Of those, 28,773 (52.8%) are registered Democrats, 8,096 (14.8%) are registered Republicans, and 15,012 (27.5%) have declined to state a political party.

== Education ==
=== Public schools ===
Antioch Unified School District covers the vast majority of the city limits. Antioch USD consists of three high schools, four middle schools, and numerous elementary schools that follow a single-track schedule, with school starting in late August or early September, and concluding in June.

The three high schools are:

- Antioch High School
- Deer Valley High School
- Dozier-Libbey Medical High School

The four middle schools are:

- Antioch Middle School
- Park Middle School
- Black Diamond Middle School
- Dallas Ranch Middle School

Small sections are in the Brentwood Union Elementary School District and the Liberty Union High School District.

=== Private schools ===
The private schools are primarily religious. The private high schools are:

- Heritage Baptist Academy (K-12)
- Cornerstone Christian School (K-12)

The private primary and middle schools are:

- Holy Rosary Elementary School
- Hilltop Christian School
- Kinder Care Learning Center
- Antioch Christian School
- Golden Hills Christian School
- Great Beginnings Elementary School

The charter schools are: Antioch Charter Academy (est. 1998) Antioch Charter Academy II (est. 2007)

Antioch is also home to Western Career College, located on Lone Tree Way.

=== Public libraries ===
The Prewett Library of the Contra Costa County Library system serves Antioch and is located inside the Antioch Community Center, across the street from Deer Valley High School.

== Media ==
Antioch is served by the Antioch Press, published by Brentwood Press & Publishing Corporation. Antioch Press is a weekly newspaper that is published every Friday. The current circulation is just over 4,000.

The Antioch Ledger was first issued on March 10, 1870. To commemorate the paper's formation, a copy of its first issue has been framed and hangs over the desk of the present editor. The sole news item is a report with editorial comment on a women's suffrage meeting that had just been held in the town. The Ledger later merged with the Contra Costa Times and printed its last issue in 2005. The Times' weekly publication, the Antioch News, which is an expansion of the Brentwood News is published each Friday.

The Antioch Press published its first issue in January 2001, direct mailing newspapers to all homes and businesses in the city twice monthly, and then weekly from September 2005 until the 2008 economic crash. It continued to publish and distribute only in racks and stacks throughout town until June 2012. It was then only published online until 2020 when it was combined with the Brentwood Press, Oakley Press, and Discovery Bay Press into one paper, distributed in stacks and racks throughout the city as The Press. The Antioch Herald was first launched online in October 2010 and then expanded to print in May 2011, mailing to homes and businesses in Antioch each month. As of 2021, due to the impacts on businesses from the COVID-19-related government health orders, the Herald is only available online. A strictly online news source, East County Today was launched online in July 2012 covering Antioch and the other three cities and five unincorporated communities in eastern Contra Costa County.

== Infrastructure ==
=== Transportation ===
==== Roads ====
Antioch's primary surface transportation link is via the freeway State Route 4, both westward a half-hour's drive to Interstate 80 and the road network of the Bay Area, or alternatively eastward to connect with Interstate 5 at the Central Valley city of Stockton, California. State Route 160 leads north from Highway 4, crossing the San Joaquin River via the Antioch Bridge and through the Delta to Sacramento.

Antioch has been involved in long-term roadway redevelopment efforts connected to California's expansion of bicycle infrastructure. A 2025 report noted that some projects in Antioch have remained under development since the early 2000s amid broader statewide concerns about safety oversight and implementation timelines.

==== Public Transit ====
Antioch is served by both the Antioch-Pittsburg Amtrak station, and access to Bay Area Rapid Transit (BART) is available at the Antioch eBART Station. Although public transportation agency Tri-Delta Transit is the predominant provider of public transportation in the Antioch area, County Connection bus #93X also serves Antioch going to John Muir Medical Center, Mitchell Park n' Ride, Railroad Castlewood, Delta Fair Sommersville and Hillcrest Park 'n Ride. At one time the city had a 50-cent-per-ride senior shuttle. However, due to budget cuts in 2011 a proposal was made to eliminate the $275,000 subsidy for this program. Currently the senior and paratransit system still operates on call service for $2.75 per fare.

==== Airports ====
Antioch's closest airport with commercial service is Buchanan Field Airport, though its sole airline is JSX and only flies to Las Vegas, Burbank and Orange County. Through BART, Antioch is directly connected to San Francisco International Airport, though through the use of BART transfers, Antioch is also connected to Oakland Airport and through VTA, San Jose Airport.

Antioch is also equidistant from Oakland Airport to Stockton Metropolitan Airport, though no transit services connects Stockton and Antioch.

Antioch Airport was closed in 1989.

=== Water ===
The Sacramento–San Joaquin River Delta has been a large source of fresh water for the city but increasing salinity levels have reduced the city's ability to use the river intake. In response, the city is building the first surface-water desalination plant in the Bay Area.

== Notable people ==
=== Sports ===
- Joey Aguilar, college football quarterback for the Tennessee Volunteers
- Frank Beede, former offensive lineman for the Seattle Seahawks, now a coach at Freedom High School
- Paul Blackburn, pitcher for the Oakland Athletics
- Mark Bryant, soccer player and coach
- T. J. Carrie, professional football player currently playing for the Indianapolis Colts
- David Douglas, professional mixed martial artist
- Najee Harris, professional football player for the Los Angeles Chargers
- Taiwan Jones, football cornerback and running back for the Buffalo Bills
- Maurice Jones-Drew, former running back for the Jacksonville Jaguars
- Mike Lucky, former tight end for the Dallas Cowboys
- Gino Marchetti, former All-American for the Baltimore Colts
- Aaron Miles, retired Oakland A's second baseman
- Sterling Moore, football cornerback who played for the Dallas Cowboys
- Jeremy Newberry, former center for the San Francisco 49ers and San Diego Chargers
- John Olenchalk, Antioch High School 1973, Stanford 1977, played for the Montreal Alouettes and the Kansas City Chiefs.
- Jeff Pico, pitching coach for the Cincinnati Reds and former Chicago Cubs pitcher
- Evan Pilgrim, former offensive guard in the National Football League
- Ron Pritchard, former football linebacker and professional wrestler, played nine seasons with the Houston Oilers and the Cincinnati Bengals
- Alex Sanchez, MLB pitcher for the Toronto Blue Jays in 1989 and All-Pac-10 standout at UCLA
- Gary Sheide, a former football quarterback for Brigham Young University
- Larry Silveira, a professional golfer who played on the PGA Tour and the Nationwide Tour
- T. J. Ward, former football strong safety for the Denver Broncos

=== Miscellaneous ===
- Chuck Billy, lead singer of metal band Testament
- Johnny Burke, lyricist
- Ty Carter, United States Marine Corps and United States Army veteran and Medal of Honor recipient
- Donovan Cook, film director and animator famous for creating 2 Stupid Dogs
- Mario "Mars" Delgado, national hip-hop recording artist, actor and entrepreneur known for his brand of horrorcore rap music.
- Carmen Dragon, conductor, composer and arranger; father of Daryl Dragon of the 1970s pop music duo Captain & Tennille
- Anthony C. Ferrante, film director, producer, and writer most famous for the Sharknado film series
- Wade Harper, first African-American mayor of Antioch
- Leah Laviano, Miss Mississippi USA in 2008
- Ronald O. Loveridge, former mayor of Riverside, California
- John Marsh, Builder of Marsh's Landing and instrumental in achieving California statehood
- Lori McCreary, film producer and President of the Producers Guild of America
- Mitchell brothers, Jim & Artie, strip club and pornography business owners until Jim was convicted of killing Artie in 1991
- Kevin Pereira, former co-host of G4's Attack of the Show! and Let's Ask America
- Mark L. Schneider, the 15th director of Peace Corps (1999–2001)
- Tom Torlakson, California Superintendent of Public Education
- Jerome R. Waldie, former United States Representative
- Ryan Mitchell Wood, rapper
- Mike Sherm, rapper

== Sister cities ==
- Chichibu, Saitama, Japan, since September 16, 1967
- Lázaro Cárdenas, Michoacán, Mexico

== See also ==
- List of sundown towns in the United States
