= Bebe Patten =

Founder of Patten University (1913–2004)

- Born: Willa Bebe Harrison; September 13, 1913
- Died: January 25, 2004 (aged 90)
- Occupations: Evangelist, Pastor, Patten University President and University Chancellor
- Spouses: Alton Bowman (m. 1932; div. 1933); C. Thomas Patten (m. 1935; died 1958)

Academic background
- Education: L.I.F.E. Bible College; Temple Hall College and Seminary PhD

Bebe Patten (September 13, 1913 – January 25, 2004) was the founder of Patten University (formerly Oakland Bible Institute), Patten Academy, Christian Cathedral and the Christian Evangelical Churches of America, Inc. denomination.

Bebe Patten had three children: identical twins Rebecca and Priscilla in 1950 and Thomas Patten Jr. in 1954.

For her achievements in education and religion, Patten received resolutions from the California State Senate (1978, 1994, and 2003) and Elihu Harris (1994).

== Early life ==
Born Willa "Willie" Bebe Harrison on September 13, 1913 to Newton and Matricia Priscilla Harrison, she began attending L.I.F.E. Bible College at seventeen, and upon graduation from L.I.F.E., became the Tennessee State Evangelist of the International Church of the Foursquare Gospel.

In the summer of 1932 Bebe married Alton Bowman but the couple was divorced at the end of 1933. Bebe conducted revival campaigns as a "girl evangelist" first with Lettie Harper and later with Mabel Lawson. Both of these co-workers were also graduates of L.I.F.E. Bible College.

C. Thomas Patten's father was convicted of bootlegging 3 times in Kentucky. C. Thomas Patten was expelled from high school at age 17 for making whisky in the high school basement. He was convicted in Florida of transporting a stolen car across state lines when he was 21. At that time, he listed his occupation as bootlegger.

In 1935, Bebe Harrison married C. Thomas Patten, who worked with her during her evangelistic crusades and her Oakland revival services. Bebe and Carl were ordained by the Fundamental Ministerial and Layman Association (FMLA - current name: Association of Fundamental Ministers and Churches) on July 6, 1937. The Temple Lighthouse Church in Cleveland, Ohio, the church of which Bebe and Carl were pastors, was also a FMLA-member church. Bebe and Carl left the FMLA in 1943 and were ordained by the International Ministerial Foundation, Inc. of Fresno, California.

== Education ==
Bebe Patten received a Ph.D. from Temple Hall College and Seminary, a mail order college run by Denver Scott Swain. Swain was a convicted swindler. C. Thomas Patten also received a degree from Temple Hall. In 1947, the Pattens purchased Temple Hall College and Seminary. Bebe Patten graduated from Aimee Semple McPherson's Lighthouse of International Four Square Evangelism. (L.I.F.E. Bible College)

== Oakland ==
Patten became a national evangelist, arrived in Oakland, California, in 1944 and began an evangelistic crusade there. The meetings continued nightly for nineteen weeks, in which as many as 5,000 people a night attended in the Oakland Auditorium Arena.

This crusade led in 1944 to the founding of the Oakland Bible Institute. The Pattens purchased the Lake Hotel in Oakland, with plans to remodel it for the Oakland Bible Institute and Church. In 1944, the Pattens purchased the City Club Building in Oakland. The Pattens founded the Oakland Bible, the Patten College and Seminary, and Academy of Christian Education. The Pattens frequently used the name Oakland Bible Institute to refer to all of the organizations.

In 1947, C. Thomas Patten attempted to get an FCC license for a radio station. He falsely claimed that the Oakland Bible School and Academy of Christian Education were accredited to the University of California. He also stated that the Oakland Bible Institute and Academy of Christian Education were run at a loss. The FCC license was denied.

An Oakland Tribune advertisement in September, 1947, refers to Bebe Patten as the educational director of Oakland Bible Institute, Academy of Christian Education, Patten College & Seminary.

In 1949, the Pattens moved their Bible school out of Piedmont and into Oakland, at the old Masonic Temple at 3365 East 14th Street, Oakland. Their lawyer stated that the Pattens would use the Piedmont property as their residence.

By 1948, the Pattens owned property in Walnut Creek, California, the former site of the Macedo Dairy. The property had four fires in 1948. Some of the fires were believed to the arson. After the third fire, the property was offered for sale. In March, 1949, the Pattens' Piedmont home burned, causing $50,000 in damage. Arson was suspected.

In October, 1948, the Pattens were sued twice. Once for failing to pay rent for a property in Berkeley. And a second time for failing to pay a contractor for alterations for their home at 30 La Salle, Piedmont, California. In November, Patten was sued by KWBR radio station for failing to pay for time used in previous 2 years.

In 1948, the Patten's school continued to be referred to as Patten College and Seminary. The Veterans Administration had approved the Patten School, but withdrew that approval in 1948.

Oakland Bible Institute was later renamed Patten University. The Pattens also founded the Academy of Christian Education high school (now Patten Academy of Christian Education: K-12), Christian Temple (now Christian Cathedral), and the Oakland Bible Church (now Christian Evangelical Churches of America, Inc.) C.

On June 29, 1950, C. Thomas Patten was convicted of grand theft, fraud, embezzlement, and obtaining money under false pretenses. He spent 3 years in San Quentin for stealing money from his congregation. One condition of his parole was that he not take up a collection. He died on May 11, 1958, in Chula Vista, California. He had previously sought treatment for narcotics addiction as a morphine user.

== Media appearances ==
Patten revival was broadcast on KLS (AM) starting in January, 1944. In 1947, Patten College was broadcast on KWBR (AM); KLS call letters changed to KWBR in 1945. KWBR also broadcast Patten Revival in 1947.

The Shepherd Hour, a daily 30-minute radio program was broadcast from 1951 to 1987. Her telecast, The Bebe Patten Hour, aired from 1976 to the 2004, and her periodical The Trumpet Call was published from 1952 to 2004.

== Jewish community work ==
Patten was an outspoken supporter of Israel. Beginning in 1962 she took her church congregation and students of Patten University on more than 25 trips to Israel. In 1975, she was named Christian Honoree of the Year by the San Francisco chapter of the Jewish National Fund, and she received several honors and awards from Israel, including the State of Israel Medallion in 1969.

She interviewed Prime Minister David Ben-Gurion in 1972 and later Prime Minister Menachem Begin. She also had audiences with Yitzhak Shamir, Yitzhak Rabin, and Ariel Sharon.

In 1975 and 1977, Patten University planted two forests of 10,000 trees in the Negev region of Israel. In 1981, Bar-Ilan University honored her with the Bebe Patten Chair of Social Action and appointed her a member of the university’s international board in 1991.

== Racial and social issues ==
Patten was also known for promoting racial equality in all the institutions she founded. Patten University was recognized as a “model of diversity,” but her influence began much earlier.

During the mid-1930s and 1940s two of her revivals burned her revivalist tent to the ground after she preached against racism, segregation and social injustices that took place in the South.

She attended the funeral of the Rev. Martin Luther King Jr. and personally offered her condolences to Coretta Scott King, his widow.

== Death and legacy ==
Patten died at 90 years of age on January 25, 2004, after a long illness.

Patten’s second husband, C. Thomas Patten, died in 1958, and two of her children predeceased her, Thomas Patten Jr. in 1989 and Priscilla Benham in 2000. She was survived by her daughter Rebecca Skaggs and one grandchild, Charmaine Benham.

Her biography, Winning the Race: Dr. Bebe Patten, Her Life and Ministry, written by Glenn Kunkel, was released in 2000. At the time of publication, Kunkel was described as a "50-year follower of Dr. Patten's ministries and professor of English emeritus of Patten College".

A second biography, No Room For Doubt: The Life and Ministry of Bebe Patten, written by Dr. Abraham Ruelas, was published by Seymour Press in 2012. In 2012, Ruelas was on the faculty of Patten University.
