= Riverview Union High School Building =

Historic school district in California, United States

- U.S. National Register of Historic Places
- U.S. Historic district
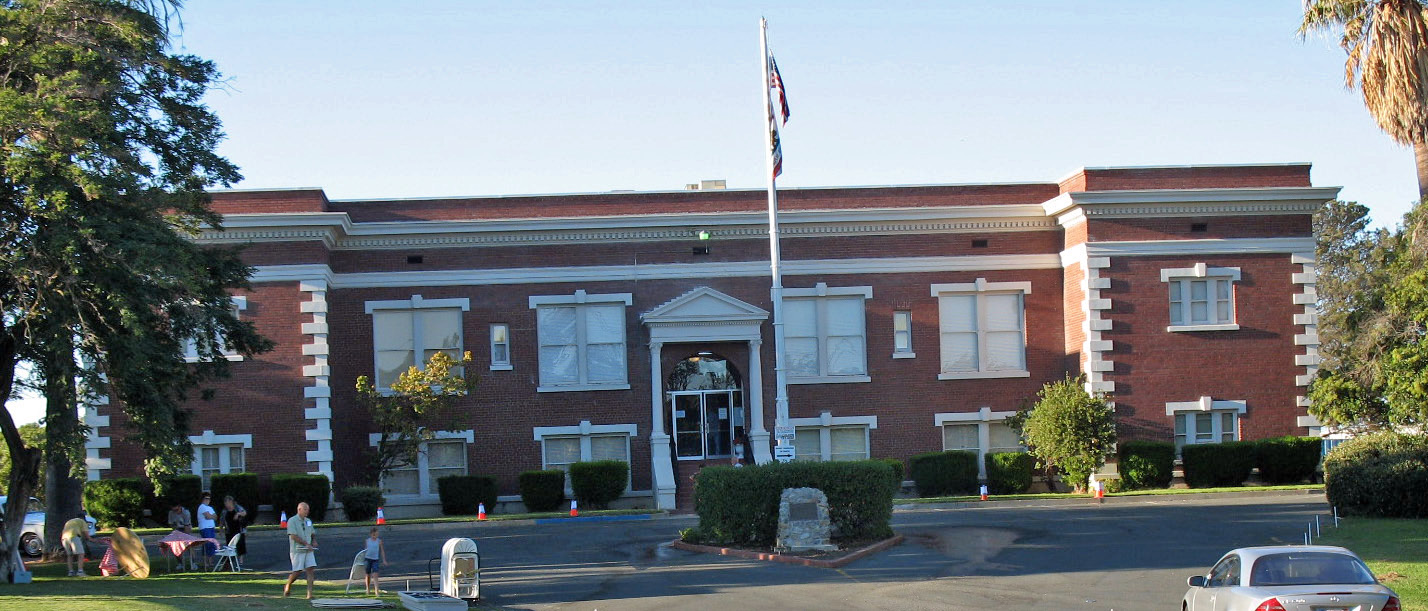

- Location within California Location within the United States
- Location: 1500 W. 4th St., Antioch, California
- Coordinates: 38°0′58.71″N 121°49′35.66″W
- Area: 2.8 acres (1.1 ha)
- Architectural style: Late 19th and 20th Century Revival
- NRHP reference No.: 98001243
- Added to NRHP: October 14, 1998

The Riverview Union High School was the first high school built in Contra Costa County. Located at 1500 W First Street in Antioch, California. Charles Appleton Hooper donated the land to end a dispute between Antioch and Pittsburg over land that was used for the school. The school opened November 4, 1911. Students from as far away as Oakley and Pittsburg attended this high school. The last class that graduated from the high school was in 1931. A new high school replaced this one located on D Street in Antioch. The building was then occupied by the Bureau of Reclamation during the design and construction of the Central Valley Project. In 1947, the Fibreboard Corporation bought the building for its research. The Riverview Fire Protection District acquired the building in 1965 for its headquarters, until leaving it unused in 1994. The Antioch Historical Society bought the property in 1999, and they now use it as their main headquarters.

== See also ==
- National Register of Historic Places listings in Contra Costa County, California
