= Briones =

Briones may refer to:

== People ==
- Abel Briones Ruiz (born 1973), Mexican business owner and suspected drug lord
- Agustín Briones (born 1988), Argentinian football player
- Alice Briones, American physician
- Ana Briones Alonso (born 1972), Spanish scientist
- Beatriz Briones (born 1999), Mexican sprint kayaker
- Brandon Briones (born 2001), American artistic gymnast
- Cecilia Ansaldo (born 1949), Ecuadorian professor, essayist, and literary critic
- David Briones (born 1943), American judge
- Enrique Briones (born 1962), Spanish rower
- Fernando Briones Carmona (1905–1988), Spanish painter
- Félipe Briones (born 1950), Chilean skier
- Heidi Briones, American politician
- Henry Briones, Mexican mixed martial artist
- Ignacio Briones (born 1972), Chilean economist, academic and politician
- Inti Briones (born 1971), Chilean cinematographer
- Isa Briones (born 1999), American actor and singer
- Jon Jon Briones, Filipino-American actor
- Jose Briones (1916–unknown), Filipino lawyer and politician
- José Antonio Lacayo de Briones y Palacios (1679–1756), Spanish politician
- José Luis Briones Briseño (born 1963), Mexican politician
- Juan Ignacio Briones (born 1986), Argentinian football player
- Juana Briones de Miranda (1802–1889)
- Julio Briones (born 1975), Ecuadorian football player
- Leo Rodríguez (baseball) (1929–2011), baseball player
- Leonor Briones (born 1940), Filipino academician, economist, and civil servant
- Luis María Balanzat de Orvay y Briones (1775–1843), Spanish soldier, engineer and writer
- Manuel Briones (1893–1957), Filipino judge and politician
- Marcelo Fernan (1927–1999), Filipino politicianr
- Patricia Briones (born 1962), Ecuadorian politician
- Philippe Briones (born 1970), French animator, author and comic book artist
- Ramón Briones Luco (1872–1949), Chilean politician
- Ramón Castroviejo (1904–1987), Spanish-American eye surgeon
- Rocío Briones (born 1976), Spanish politician
- Rosario Briones (born 1953), Mexican gymnast

== Places ==
- Briones, Kalibo, Philippines
- Briones, La Rioja, Spain

=== Contra Costa County, California, United States ===
- Briones Hills, United States
- Briones Regional Park, United States
- Briones Reservoir, United States
- Briones Sandstone, United States
- Briones Valley, United States
