= Pinole Creek =

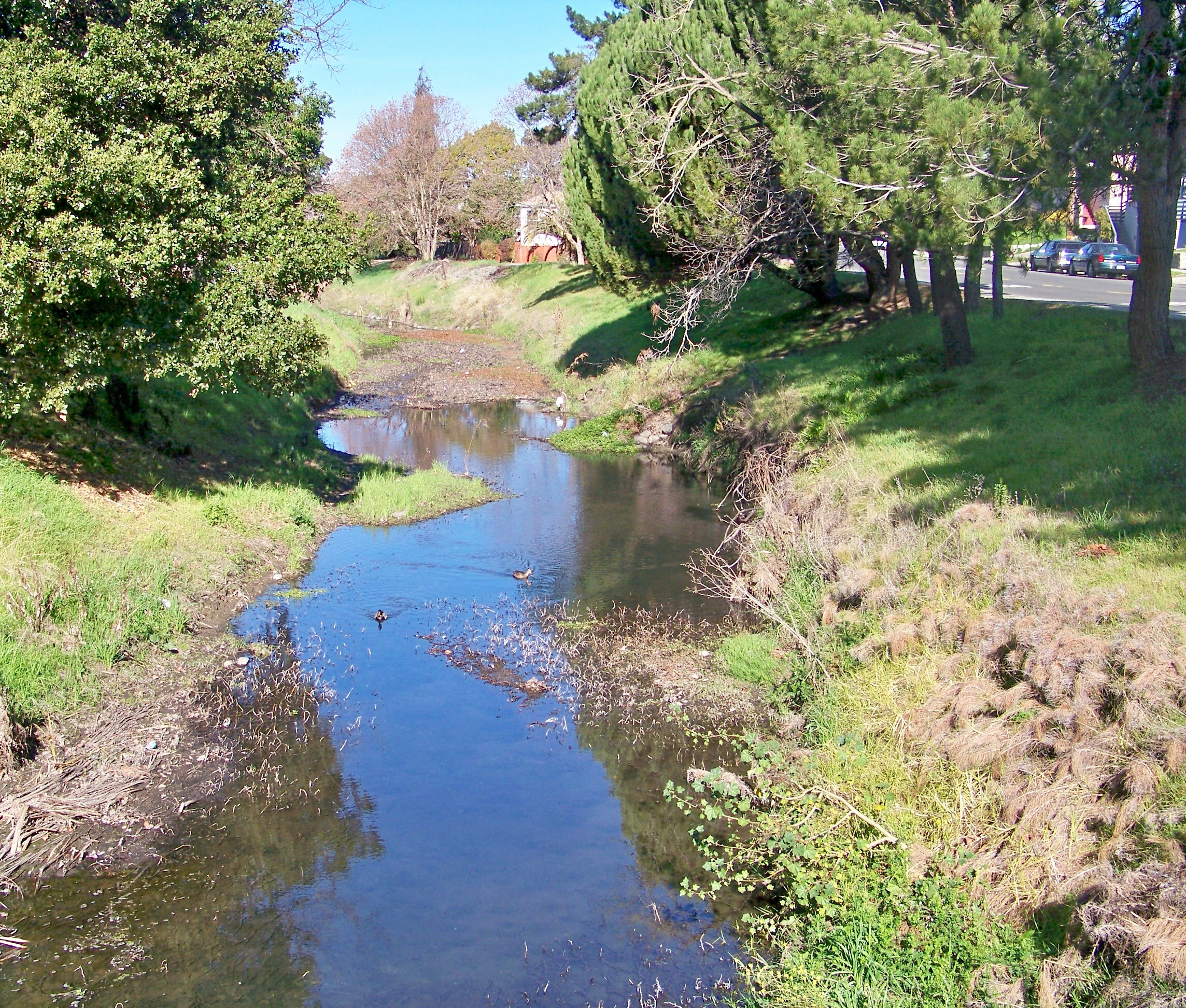

Location
- Country: United States
- State: California
- Region: Contra Costa County
- City: Pinole, California

Physical characteristics
- Source: Briones Hills
  - location: 6 mi (10 km) west of Pleasant Hill, California
  - coordinates: 37°57′3″N 122°9′34″W
  - elevation: 1,090 ft (330 m)
- Mouth: Chelsea Wetlands, San Pablo Bay
  - location: Hercules
  - coordinates: 38°0′51″N 122°17′48″W
  - elevation: 7 ft (2.1 m)

Basin features
- Tributaries
  - left: Duncan Creek
  - right: North Creek, Fana Creek

Pinole Creek is a stream in western Contra Costa County, in the East Bay region of the San Francisco Bay Area, California.

The creek has one of the last primarily undeveloped watersheds in the Bay Area.

== Course ==
The headwaters of Pinole Creek are in the Briones Hills on Costa Peak, within the western area of Briones Regional Park. It flows 10 miles (16 km) westerly through the towns of Pinole and El Sobrante, to its river mouth at the Chelsea Wetlands in Hercules on San Pablo Bay. Its mouth is 4 miles (6.4 km) east of Point Pinole.

== History ==
The name Pinole is from the Spanish term for "parched corn", which the Mexicans ground for eating. In 1823, a Mexican land grant for 17,000 acres (69 km^{2}) that included Pinole Creek was granted to Don Ignacio Martinez, a Commandant of the San Francisco Presidio. The land grant was initially known as El Rancho de La Nuestra Sonora de Merced, and later renamed Rancho El Pinole. Martinez built the first adobe in Pinole Valley and brought his family to settle the property with livestock and orchards.

== Watershed ==
The upper watershed contains large areas of open space and managed grazing lands, with ranching and agricultural activities, and residential equestrian properties. The lower watershed contains the historic Old Town District of Pinole, and suburban neighborhoods in Pinole, El Sobrante, and Hercules. The watershed follows the regional geologic northwest–southeast orientation, similar to the orientation of the Berkeley Hills, and is located just northeast of the Sobrante Ridge.

The watershed is approximately 39.6 square miles (103 km^{2}) in area, extending from headwaters on Costa and Duarte Peaks in the Briones Hills, northwest to the San Pablo Bay just east of Wilson Point. The average annual rainfall for the Pinole Creek watershed is 610 mm (24 in), with 90% falling between November and April. There are twelve minor, locally named tributaries and the gradient is 1%.

In 1965, the Army Corps of Engineers armored the creek channel between Interstate 80 and San Pablo Bay for flood control. However, this removed riparian zone vegetation and tree cover needed for food, shelter, and shade for fish and other wildlife.

== Ecology ==
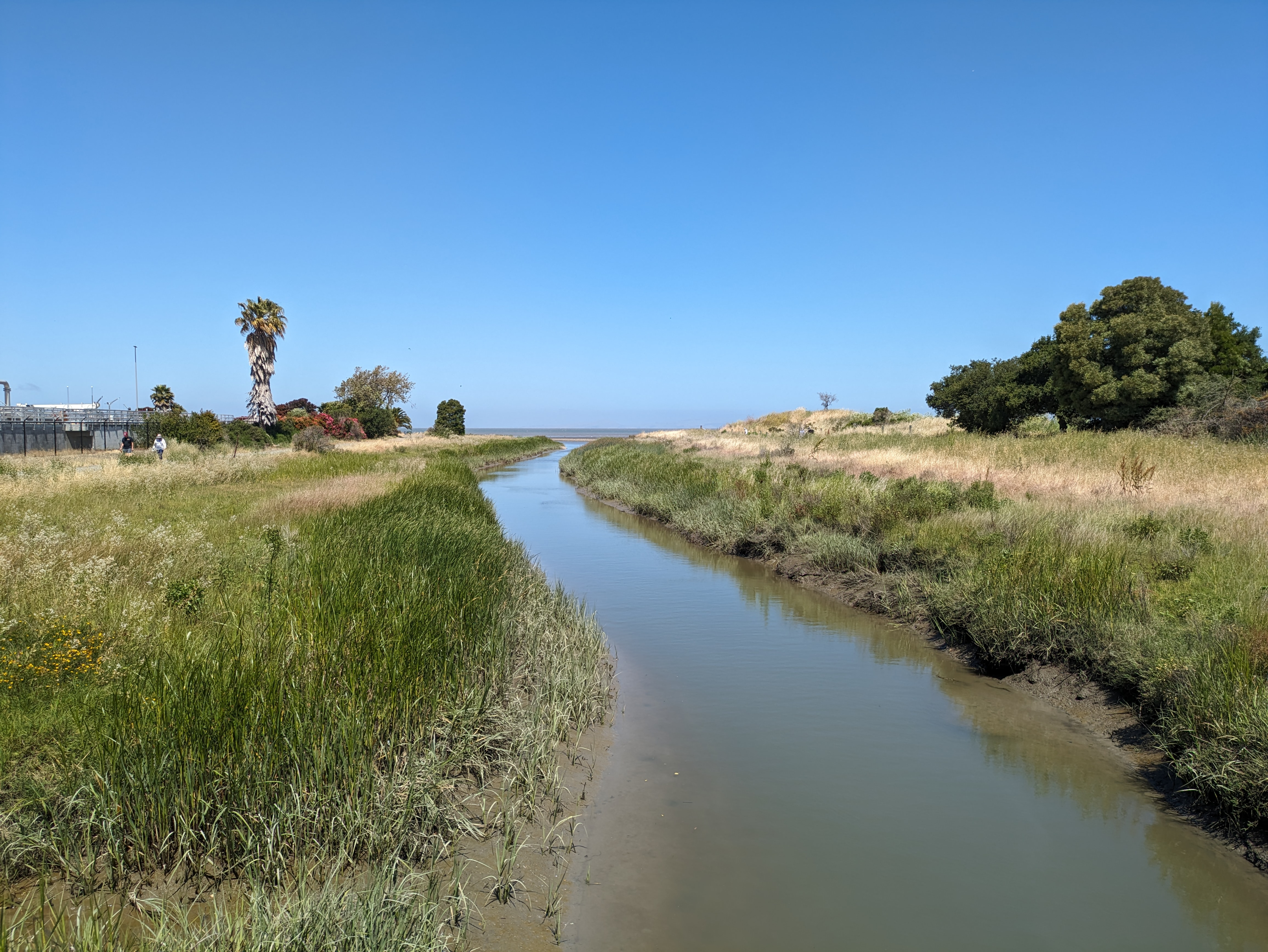
Near the mouth of the creek at San Pablo Bay

=== Fauna ===
Biologists from the East Bay Municipal Utility District (EBMUD) have observed Steelhead trout (Oncorhyncus mykiss) in the Pinole Creek watershed of multiple ages. Genetic studies by EBMUD in 1999 suggest that the trout are native Central California stock and not introduced. Perennial flows are jeopardized by water usage in the upper watershed but the creek may have the best trout restoration potential in the East Bay because large portions of the watershed are in open space. However, the I-80 crossing may be a significant obstacle to upstream trout migration.

Pinole Creek supports a mostly native fish assemblage including rainbow/steelhead trout, California roach (Lavinia symmetricus), Sacramento sucker (Catostomus occidentalis), Threespine stickleback (Gasterosteus aculeatus), Prickly sculpin (Cottus asper). Mosquitofish (Gambusia affinis) and Common carp (Cyprinus carpio) are nonnative fishes found predominantly in the lower section of Pinole Creek, below Interstate 80.

=== Flora ===
Native plants are species of the California chaparral and woodlands and riparian forest habitats. Invasive plant species such as Giant reed (Arundo donax), Scotch broom (Cytisus scoparius), Yellow star thistle (Centaurea solstitialis), Himalayan blackberry (Rubus discolor) and many others are established along riparian zone sections of Pinole Creek.

== See also ==
- List of watercourses in the San Francisco Bay Area
