= Rancho Cañada del Hambre y Las Bolsas =

Mexican land grant in what is now Contra Costa County, California

Coordinates: 37.940°N 122.100°W

Rancho Cañada del Hambre y Las Bolsas was a 13,354-acre (54.04 km^{2}) Mexican land grant in present day northwestern Contra Costa County, California.

It was given in 1842 by Governor Juan Alvarado to Teodora Soto. The grant consisted of "Cañada del Hambre" which means "Valley of Hunger" in Spanish, and "Las Bolsas del Hambre" which refers to "pockets" of land.

The rancho extended from present day Crockett to Martinez and south to Lafayette.

== History ==
The grant to Teodora Soto was "sobrante", being a remainder after the four square league Ygnacio Martinez Rancho El Pinole on the west and the three square league William Welch Rancho Las Juntas on the east were accounted for. It was estimated that the sobrante would contain three square leagues of land. Teodora Soto was married to Desiderio Briones.

With the cession of California to the United States following the Mexican-American War, the 1848 Treaty of Guadalupe Hidalgo provided that the land grants would be honored. As required by the Land Act of 1851, a claim for Rancho Cañada del Hambre y Las Bolsas was filed with the Public Land Commission in 1852, and the grant was patented to Teodora Soto in 1866.

In 1860, Soto sold an undivided half of the rancho to William Adam Piper and the other half to J.B. Crockett and Lucy Page. Joseph Bryant Crockett (1809–1884) was an Associate Justice of the California Supreme Court, for whom the town of Crockett is named. Lucy B. Page was the wife of Crockett's law partner Gwyn Page. Piper was also a business partner of Crockett. Later Crockett and Page sold a portion of the rancho to Ira J. True. Although the rancho was patented to Soto in 1866, the exact boundaries were not determined until the boundaries of Rancho El Pinole and Rancho Las Juntas were fixed. This led to several lawsuits over the property. Thomas Edwards purchased 1,800 acres (7.3 km^{2}) from Crockett in 1867.

== Historic sites of the Rancho ==
- The Old Homestead. The first American home in Crockett, constructed in 1867 by Thomas Edwards, on land purchased from J. B. Crockett.

== See also ==
- Ranchos of Contra Costa County, California
- List of California Ranchos
