= Rancho Boca de la Cañada del Pinole =

Mexican land grant in California

Coordinates: 37.940°N 122.160°W

Rancho Boca de la Cañada del Pinole was a 13,316-acre (53.89 km^{2}) Mexican land grant in present-day Contra Costa County, California given in 1842 by Governor Juan Alvarado to María Manuela Valencia. The name means "Mouth of the Pinole Valley" in Spanish. The rancho located between present-day Martinez, Pleasant Hill, Orinda, and Lafayette.

== History ==
Felipe Santiago Briones (1790 -1840) was a soldier at the San Francisco Presidio. He married Maria Manuela Valencia in 1810. Maria Manuela Valencia's brother, Candelario Valencia, was the grantee of Rancho Acalanes. In 1829, Briones and his family settled on the El Pinole lands, built a home (near what is now the Bear Creek Staging area), and in 1839, petitioned for a grant of El Pinole. When Felipe Briones was killed in 1840, his widow, Maria Manuela Valencia de Briones, petitioned for the land grant in her name. In 1842, Governor Alvarado, made a three square league grant of Rancho Boca de la Cañada del Pinole to María Manuela Valencia and a four square league grant of Rancho El Pinole to Ygnacio Martinez.

With the cession of California to the United States following the Mexican-American War, the 1848 Treaty of Guadalupe Hidalgo provided that the land grants would be honored. As required by the Land Act of 1851, a claim was filed with the Public Land Commission in 1852, and the grant was patented to María Manuela Valencia in 1878.

In 1870, the Briones family sold their lands to Simon and Elias Blum who developed orchards and cultivated fruit.

In 1909, the Peoples' Water Company, the precursor to the East Bay Municipal Utility District, purchased the land for the watershed. The nearby Briones Reservoir was constructed in 1964. The East Bay Regional Parks District later acquired Briones and opened the 6,117-acre (24.75 km^{2}) Briones Regional Park in 1967.

== See also ==
- Ranchos of Contra Costa County, California
