= Oleum, California =

Unincorporated community in California, United States

Oleum
- Unincorporated community
- Location in California
- Coordinates: 38°02′41″N 122°14′54″W
- Country: United States
- State: California
- County: Contra Costa
- Elevation: 203 ft (62 m)
- GNIS ID: 1659298
- FIPS code: 06-53658

Oleum was an unincorporated community in Contra Costa County, California, United States, located between the unincorporated town of Rodeo and Tormey. It was a small company town, with housing for Union Oil company workers, hence the name, derived from "petroleum". The refinery still exists. The site is located on the Mexican land grant Rancho El Pinole made to Ygnacio Martinez. A post office operated at Oleum from 1910 to 1951.
