= Alhambra Springs =

Water source in California

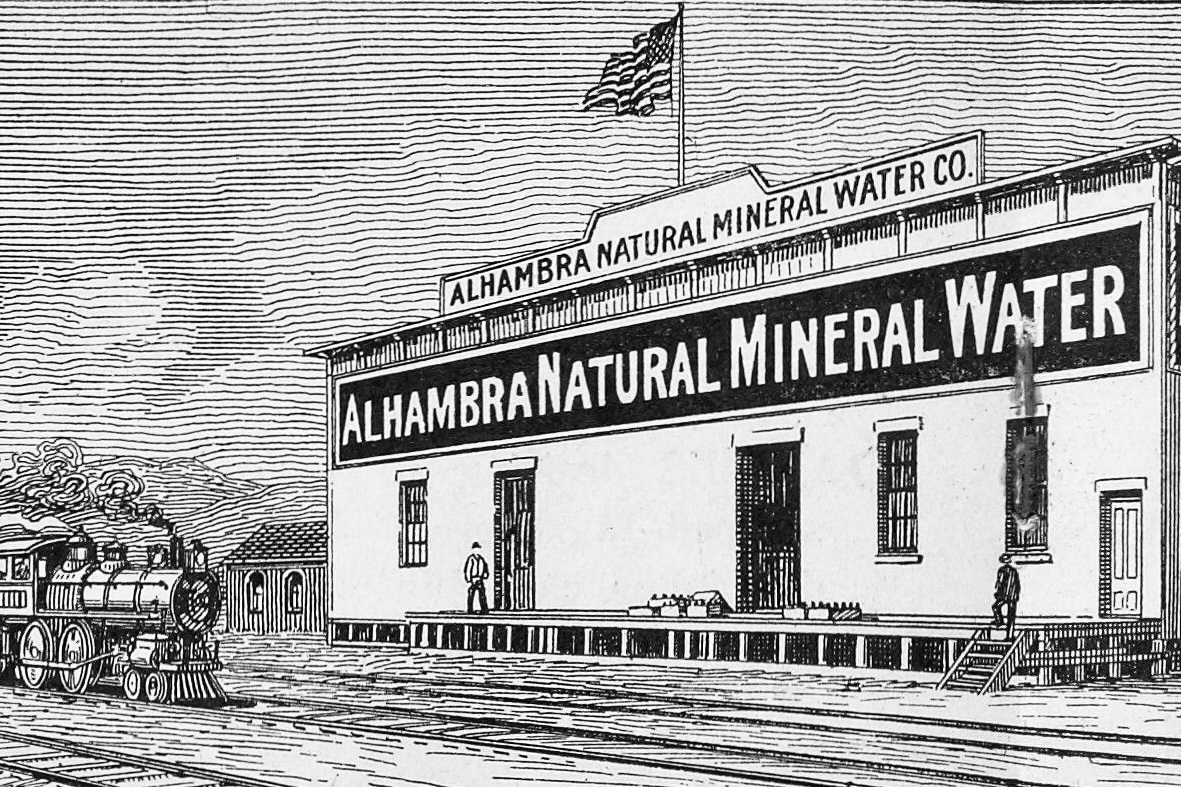
- Location: Near Martinez, Contra Costa County, California, U.S.

Alhambra Springs is or was a group of natural springs in the hills of Contra Costa County, California, United States. The six spring vents were located on a hillside south of Martinez, above Alhambra Creek in the vicinity of Briones Regional Park. In the 20th century, Alhambra Springs was a popular locally bottled water in Northern California. The springs are no longer commercialized, but Alhambra remains a brand name, and as of 2008 there was still a "trickle" of water at Alhambra Springs.

== History ==
According to a 1907 account, a drive from Oakland of an hour and a half or a train ride on the Southern Pacific Railroad would deliver you to the vicinity of the springs, which were "situated at the head of the picturesque Alhambra Valley...and the property of which they form a part consists of one hundred and ninety acres of beautifully wooded country diversified by hills and ferny cañons." Alhambra Springs are in the vicinity of what is now Briones Regional Park.

The Smith family had opened the Alhambra Springs Resort in the 1890s. In 1895 the springs were advertised "for rent", and in 1897 they were for sale, at which time there were six rental cottages on the 109-acre (44 ha) property. Bottling of the water for sale began around 1898. During this period, a "shrewd businessman" named Loron M. Lasell ran a general store and a hardware store in Martinez, and he "allowed customers from his general store to shop on credit. A generous year often went by before he attempted collecting on past due accounts. If you couldn't pay in cash you could pay with an acre or two of land." According to his grandson, between 1894 and 1921 Lasell acquired almost 300 acres "from Elam Smith, F. M. Smith, John Zurfluh, Gertrude Upham...including that property known as Alhambra Springs."

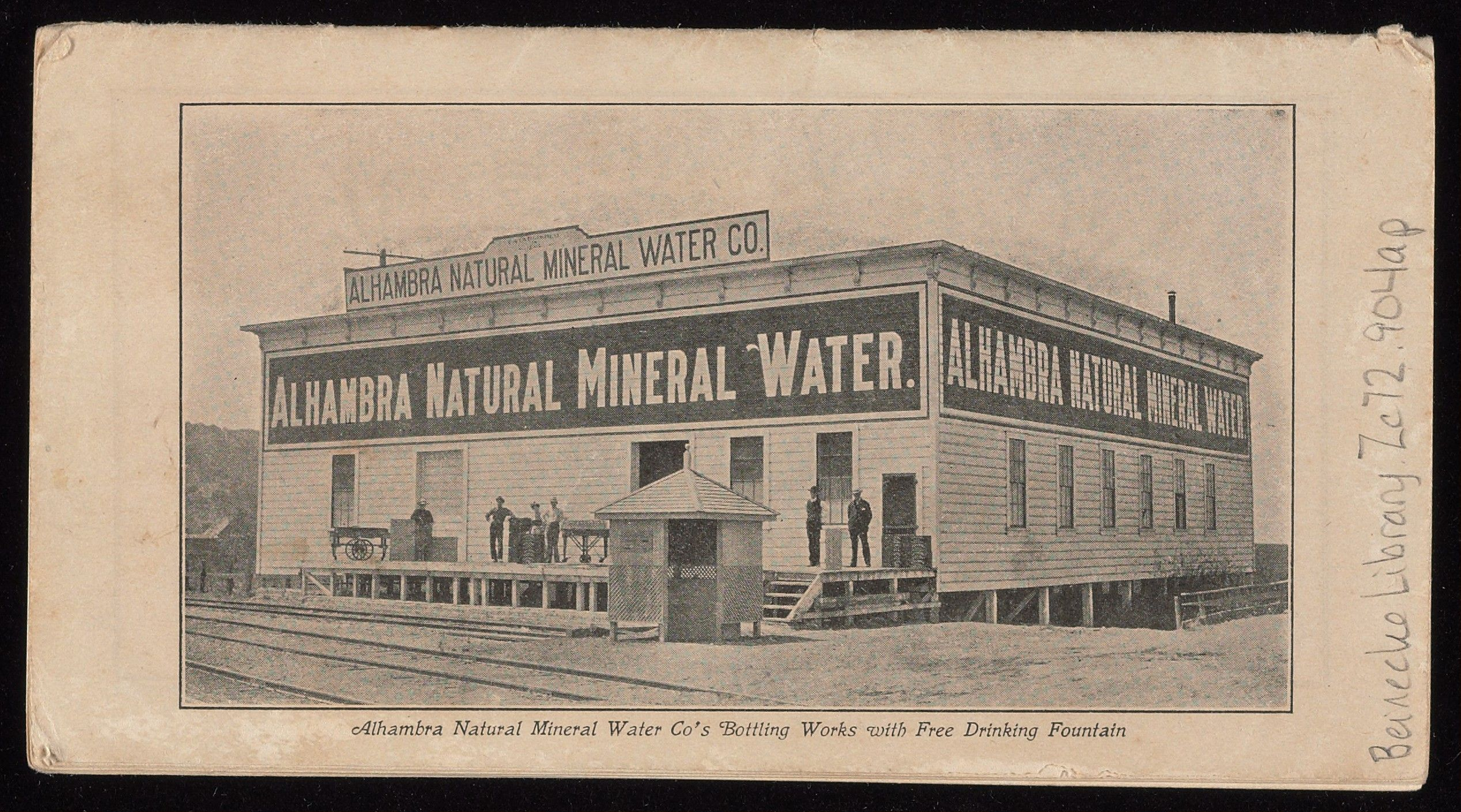
Bottling plant c. 1904

Lasell, who also claimed to be a skilled dowser, soon established Alhambra Springs Water Company. The founding date was said to be 1902, per a radio jingle that ran for many years: "Alhambra water is good for you since 1902". Around 1905 Lasell ran a two-inch-diameter galvanized steel pipe 8 miles (13 km) from the spring to a bottling plant in town with easy access to the railroad and nearby docks. At one time the company ran up to 33 delivery trucks, and had distribution centers in San Francisco and Oakland. Alhambra water was shipped throughout California, as well as to Arizona, Mexico, and the Hawaiian Islands. At one point Lasell was offered a Coca-Cola distributorship, but turned it down because Alhambra had its own line of "carbonated root beer, ginger ale, and creme soda". The business was profitable enough that Lasell was able to expand supply by purchasing Big Bear Mountain Springs in the Oakland Hills. In the 1940s a five-gallon water bottle was sold for 50 cents. The Lasell brothers sold out in the 1950s, to either the National Ice Company of San Francisco in 1951, or Foremost-McKesson in 1952. In 1956, a catastrophic fire at the bottling plant on Marina Vista in Martinez destroyed the old building.

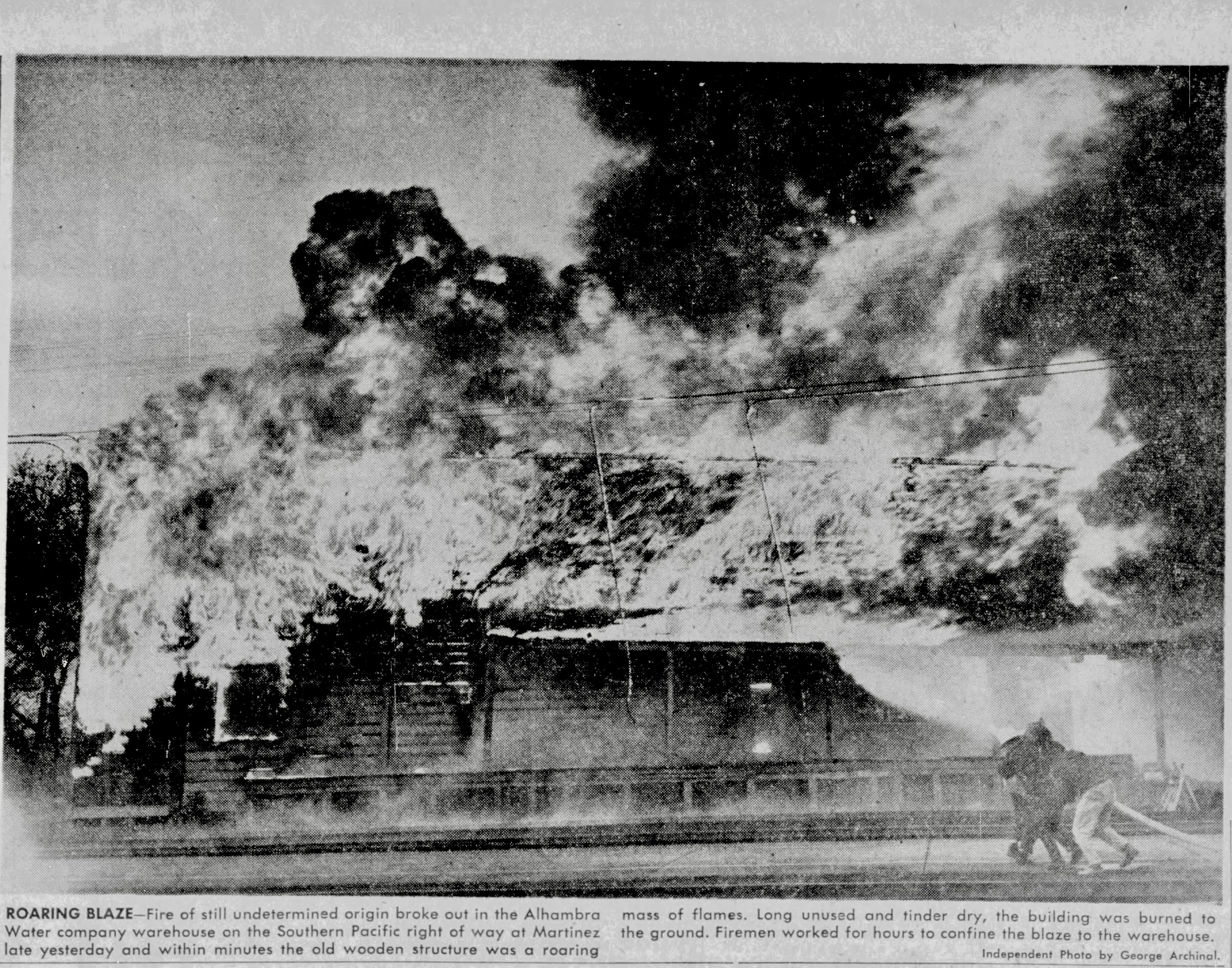
George Archinal photograph of the 1956 Alhambra bottling plant fire, for the Independent of Richmond, California

According Ernest Lasell in 1976, "The business has been sold several times since then and still maintains the name Alhambra Water although they do not use water from Alhambra Springs." The Alhambra brand was advertised up until the 1980s with commercials that featured "a smiling Alhambra water deliveryman, with a 5-gallon jug slung over his shoulder, striding up a walkway of a suburban home singing, 'Me and Alhambra water makin' friends.'" Alhambra brand water is still delivered as of 2024.

The springs property remained in the hands of five Lasell cousins as of 1976. By 1990 a newspaper account had it that "the area now is in the midst of development." In 2008 the 83-acre (34 ha) property where the springs emerge was being listed for sale for $2.5 million. At that time a "stream of water" still "trickled from a roadside spot".

== Legacy ==
- A mural of the history of Martinez created in 2011 included an image of the Alhambra Springs bottling plant.
- Vintage glass Alhambra Springs water bottles are, like many old bottles, a collector's item.

== Water profile ==
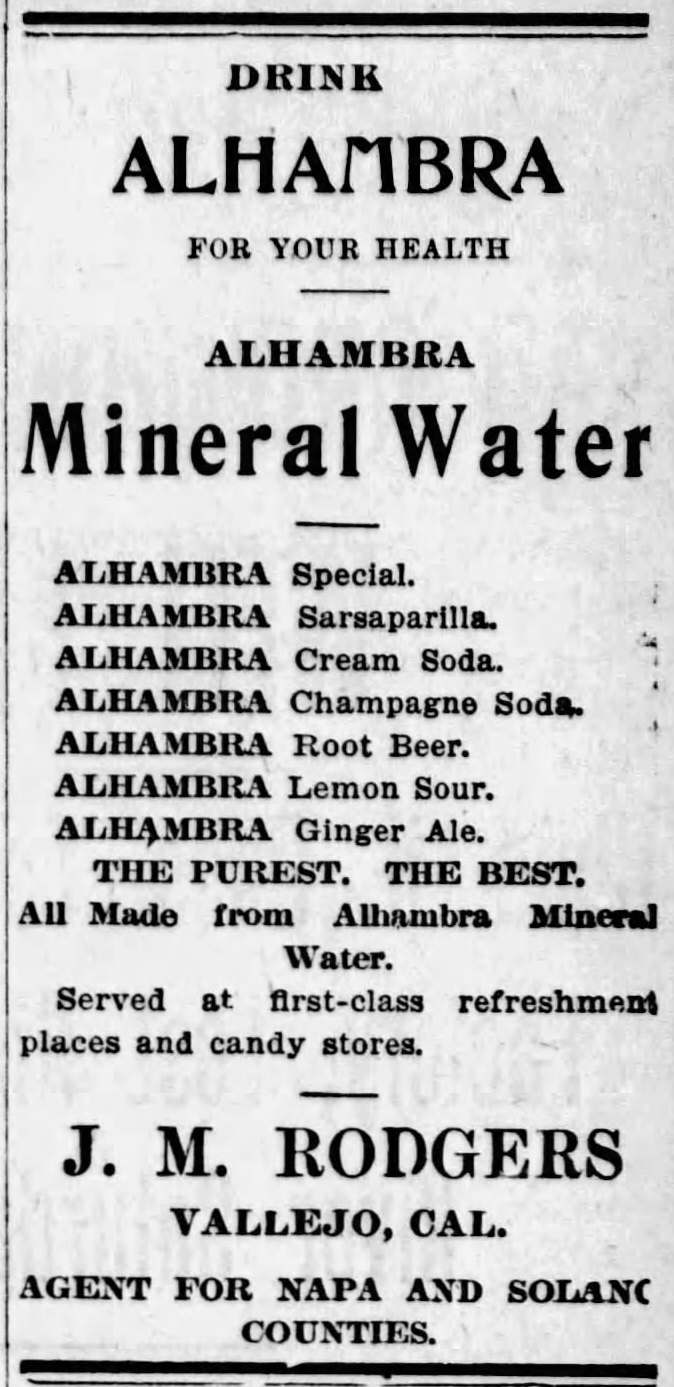
"Drink Alhambra Mineral Water" Napa Journal, July 4, 1909

A 1907 article about California springs written by regional boosters claimed that Alhambra water had a "natural supply of bicarbonates, which adds agreeably to its pleasant taste, and it is sold both in its natural state and also charged with additional carbonic-acid gas. The minerals in the water have a soothing effect upon the lining of the digestive organs, and it is a valuable remedy for rheumatism and disorders of the stomach."

In 1915, U.S. government geologist Gerald A. Waring classified Alhambra as one of the "saline springs" of California, writing that they were "small saline and sulphated springs whose waters have been bottled for medicinal use...the principal springs contain large amounts of sodium and chlorine...Of the three principal springs on the [Alhambra] property, one which is known as No. 1, fills a housed-in pool six feet square and a foot deep, on the eastern bank of the ravine; its water tastes strongly saline and sulphated...A fourth spring has a flow of a little over half a gallon a minute and is designated in the table of analyses as 'Alhambra'...the water of Spring No. 2 is less strongly mineralized than that of the others and is characterized chiefly by secondary alkahnity...The rocks near Alhambra Springs are of the same character as those at Ferndale Springs half a mile to the northwest, which have been described among the carbonated springs..."

A 1916 report had it that the bottled water from the specific spring called Alhambra "contains the salts of Sodium, Magnesium and traces of Iron and Aluminum." California geologists reported in 1921 that "A group of 6 more or less mineralized springs are situated in a narrow cañon 6 miles south of Martinez in section 2, T. 1N., R. 3W. Three of the springs have been developed, but of these only two are utilized. The principal spring, known as No. 1, fills a housed-in pool 6 feet square on the eastern bank of the ravine. It is strongly saline, as shown in the analysis below. No. 2 spring rises in a cement-covered joint on the western edge of the stream channel several hundred yards south of No. 1. The waters of No. 2 are less strongly mineralized."

== Additional images ==
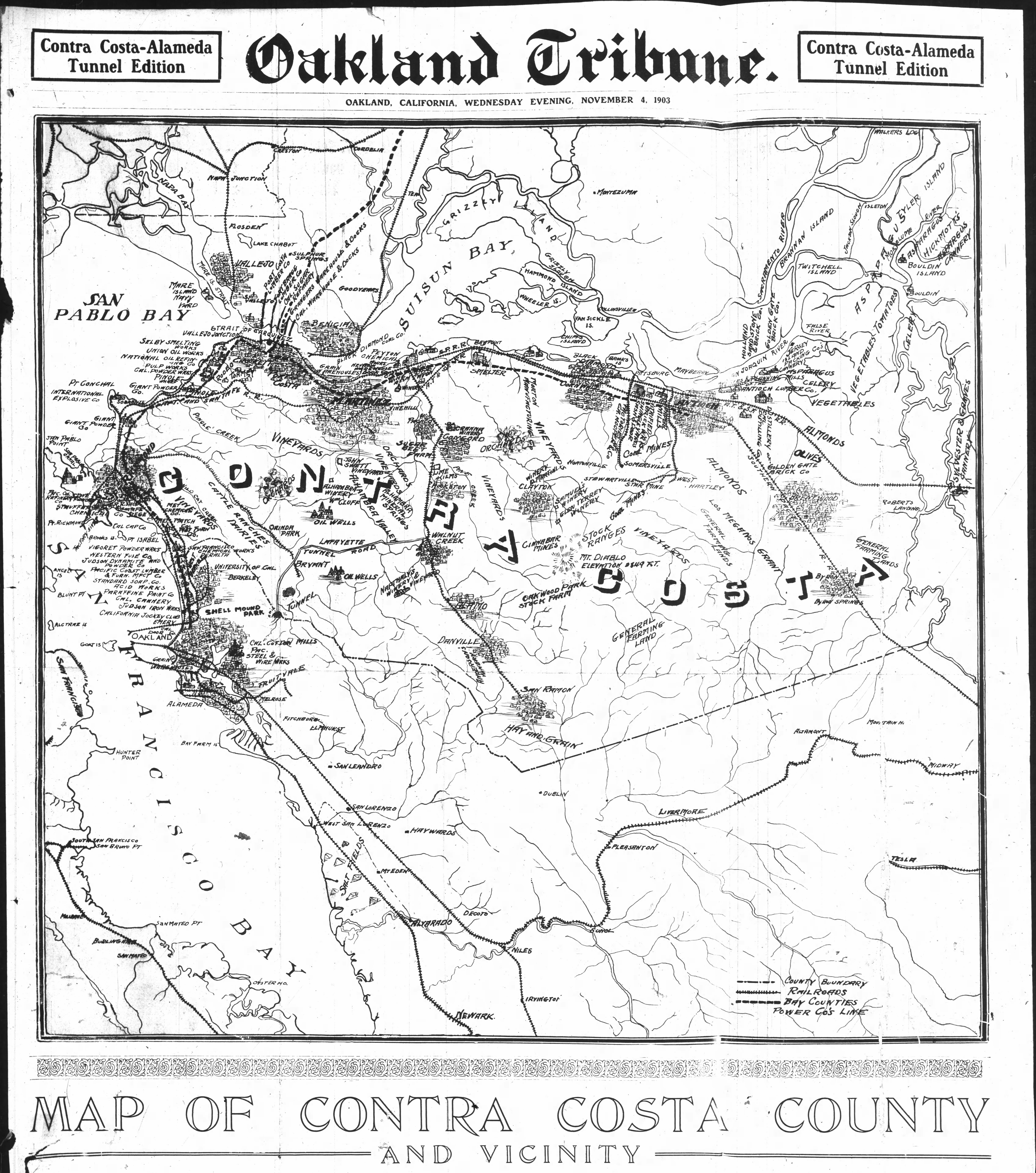
Alhambra Springs visible just south of Martinez below Suisun Bay on "Map of Contra Costa and Vicinity" Oakland Tribune, November 4, 1903

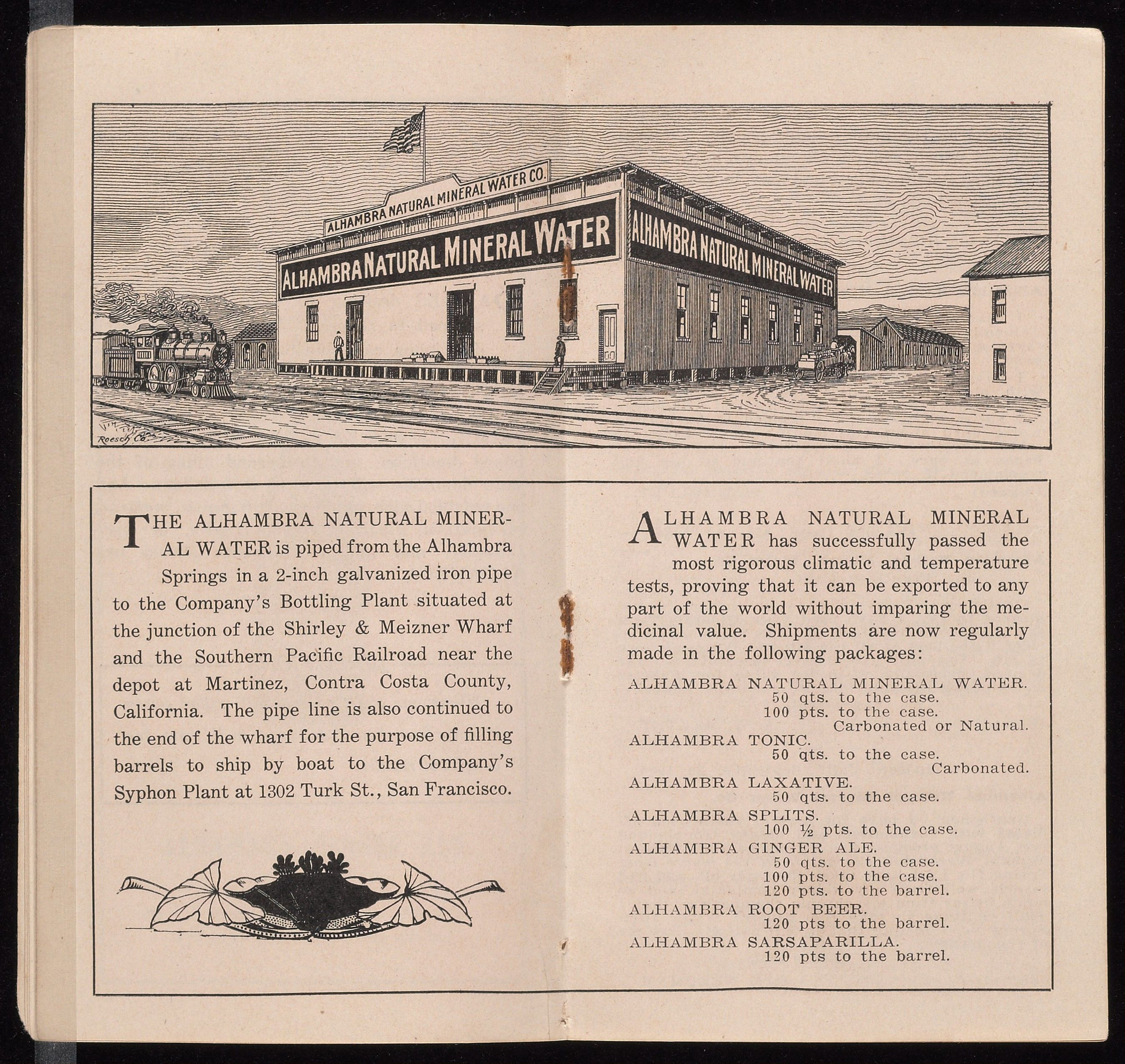
Pamphlet from the Beinecke collection at Yale

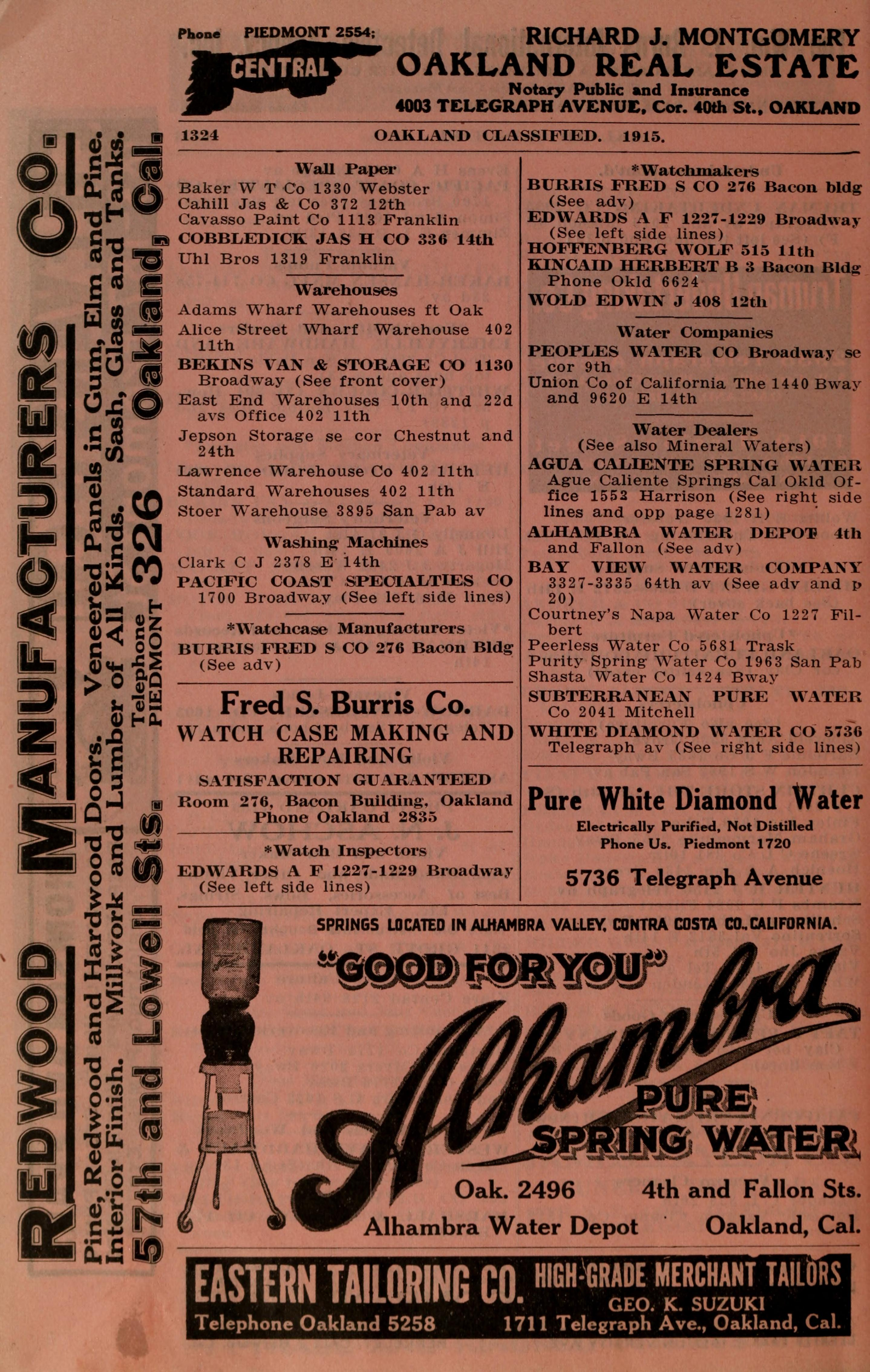
Polk-Husted Directory Co.'s Oakland, Berkeley and Alameda Directory (1915)

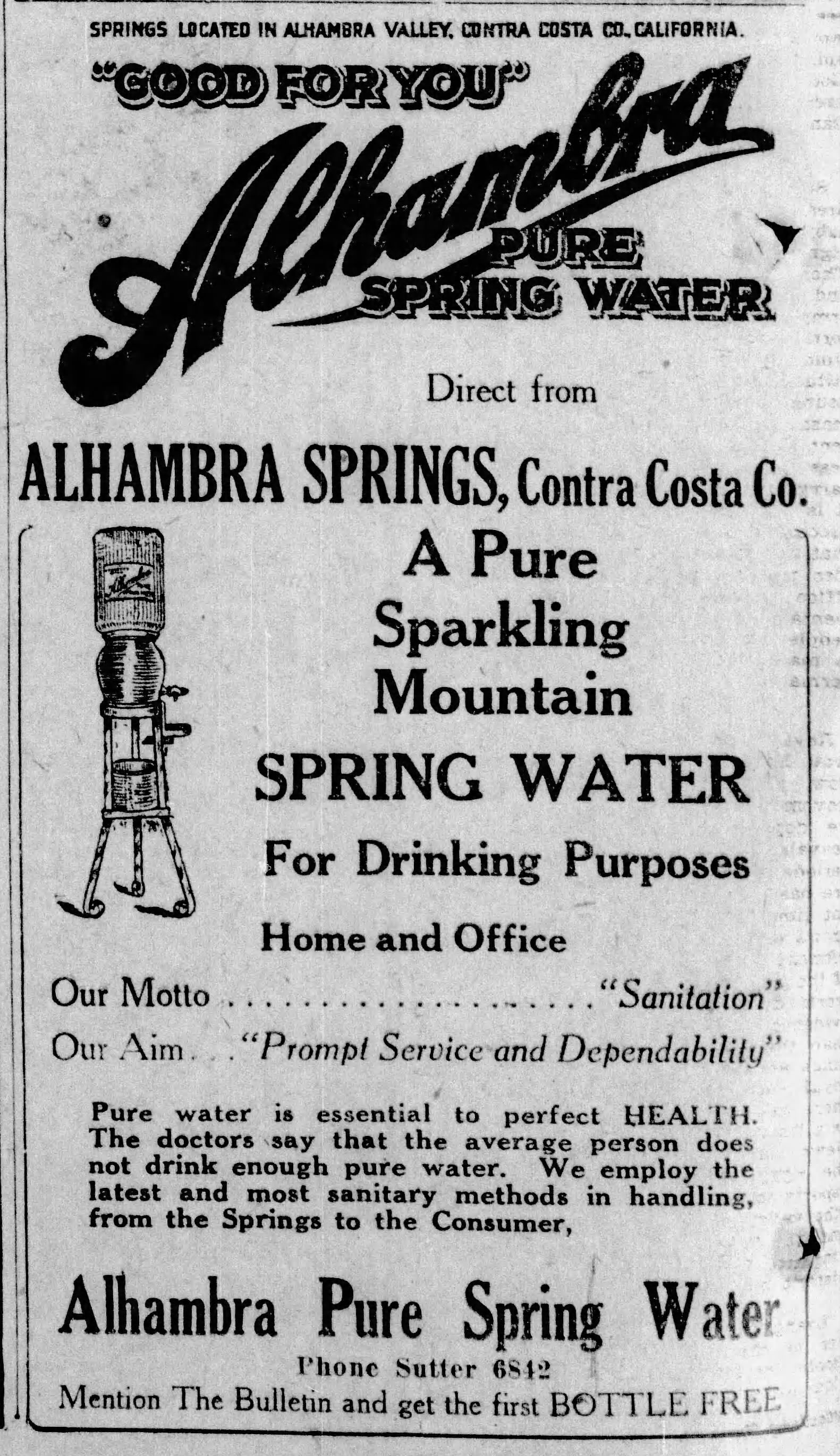
San Francisco Bulletin, Dec. 4, 1922

== See also ==
- Contra Costa County § History
