= Alhambra Creek =

Alhambra Creek Arroyo del Hambre
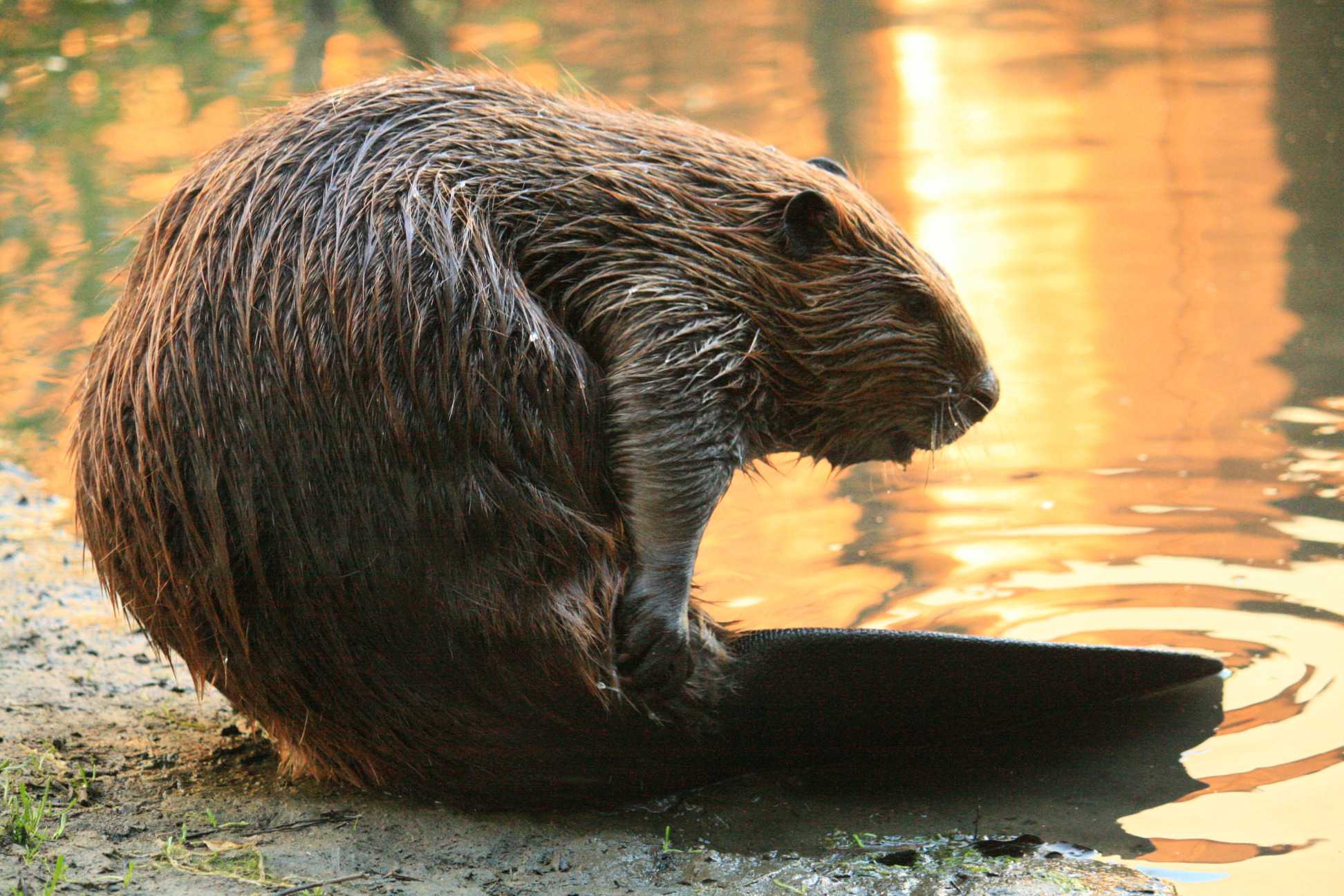
- Beaver yearling on Alhambra Creek in downtown Martinez

- Location of the mouth in California

Location
- Country: United States
- State: California
- Region: Contra Costa County
- City: Martinez

Physical characteristics
- Source: Briones Hills
  - location: 4 mi (6 km) west of Pleasant Hill, California
  - coordinates: 37°56′22″N 122°7′43″W
  - elevation: 1,034 ft (315 m)
- Mouth: Arroyo del Hambre
  - location: Martinez, California
  - coordinates: 37°58′24″N 122°7′34″W
  - elevation: 203 ft (62 m)

Basin features
- Tributaries
  - left: Franklin Creek, Arroya del Hambre Creek

Alhambra Creek is a stream in Contra Costa County, in the East Bay region of the San Francisco Bay Area in northern California.

== Geography ==
The creek drains into the Carquinez Strait at Martinez, via the historical Arroyo del Hambre. Alhambra Creek and its valley take their name from Cañada del Hambre, Spanish for "valley of hunger", apparently because of some unknown incident involving starving Spanish soldiers. The name appears on diseños repeatedly and appears on an 1842 land grant, Rancho Cañada del Hambre y Las Bolsas. Although technically Alhambra Creek only refers to the upper section of 2 miles (3 km), and the United States Board on Geographic Names in 1943 confirmed Arroyo del Hambre as the name for the lower creek, Mrs. John Strentzel, John Muir's' mother-in-law, did not like the name and renamed the lower creek also as Alhambra Creek. Currently the entire creek is commonly called the Alhambra Creek, and Arroyo del Hambre Creek and Franklin Creek are considered its two tributaries.

The Alhambra Creek Watershed covers approximately 16.5 square miles (43 km^{2}) in north central Contra Costa County, and encompasses a portion of the city of Martinez. The combined branches flow through Briones Valley, valleys containing open space, wildlife habitat, residential and commercial areas, through downtown Martinez and then discharge into the Carquinez Straits through a tidal wetland at the Martinez Regional Shoreline.

=== Course ===
Alhambra Creek originates in the Briones Hills, within Briones Regional Park. The water flows from a tunnel in the side of the hill. This tunnel was made years ago to try to tap into what the speculators thought was a vast underground river that came from the Sierras. The thought was that the lagoons on Briones Crest represented a vast underground store of water. This “aqueous mother lode” turned out to be illusory, so the tunnel was abandoned.

The linear distance from the source to the mouth of Alhambra Creek is about 6 miles (10 km). For the first 2 miles (3 km), Alhambra creek descends from about 1,100 feet (300 m) elevation to 200 feet (60 m). At this point, it is joined by Arroyo del Hambre Creek, which comes from a source at an elevation of about 900 feet (300 m), 3 miles (5 km) to the west. Arroyo del Hambre Creek is joined by several tributaries, among them Vaca Creek, on its way to join Alhambra Creek. Franklin Creek joins Alhambra Creek about 2 miles (3 km) below the confluence of Alhambra and Arroyo del Hambre Creeks. Franklin Creek drains a subwatershed of roughly the same size as the combined Upper Alhambra and del Hambre basins. It originates about 3 miles (5 km) northwest of its confluence with Alhambra and flows southeast through Franklin Canyon then bends to the north to flow through the John Muir National Historic Site and joins Alhambra Creek between Walnut Avenue and Alhambra Way. There are no reservoirs and no heavy industry in the watershed. An oil refinery is located just over the ridge to the east, and two railroads and a freeway cross the watershed.

== Human history and development ==
Beginning some 8,000 years ago, Native Americans (Miwok and Costanoan), hunted, fished and gathered food in the interior rolling hills and wetlands associated with Alhambra Creek. The use of intentionally set wildland fires became a common practice to maximize the land's productivity for hunting and seed gathering. However, by the late 18th century this way of life began to fade as the first waves of Spanish settlers moved into the Bay Area. This was the beginning of 200 years of rapid change, as the entire Bay Area transformed from a sparsely populated native landscape to a highly manipulated, densely populated urbanized setting. Arroyo del Hambre (Alhambra Creek) and its tributaries lie within the boundaries of two large Mexican Land Grants that were established in the early to mid-19th century. The city of Martinez at the mouth of the watershed was part of Rancho Pinole owned by the Martinez family. A large tidal wetland at the mouth of the creek still exists today although it is significantly reduced in size. The city was founded in 1849 on 120 acres (0.49 km^{2}) along the creek's floodplain and it has experienced numerous mild to severe seasonal flooding events ever since. Further up the watershed, the Briones family owned the Briones Valley Rancho (1852 land grant) a portion of which in modern times became the Briones Regional Park of 5,200 acres (21 km^{2}). Cattle ranching was the predominant land use in the watershed during the early years of settlement followed by establishment of orchards and vineyards in the richer soils of Alhambra Valley. By 1920, an average of 150 carloads of pears, 30 cars of grapes and 20 cars of apricots and plums were sent out annually, making Alhambra Valley one of the largest commercial pear orchards of its time.

The John Muir National Historic Site, located in Martinez, California, preserves the 14-room mansion where the naturalist and writer John Muir lived, as well as a nearby 325 acres (1.3 km^{2}) tract of oak woodland and grassland historically owned by the Muir family. The main site is on the edge of town, in the shadow of State Route 4, also known as the "John Muir Parkway". The mansion was built in 1883 by prominent physician and horticulturalist Dr. John Strentzel, Muir's father-in-law, with whom Muir went into partnership, managing his fruit ranch of 2,600 acres (11 km^{2}).

The Alhambra Springs in the upper watershed was the original source for the Alhambra Bottled Water Company. Circa 1897, Loren M. Lasell bought 300 acres (1.2 km^{2}) in Vaca Canyon on upper Alhambra Valley Road. There were hot sulfur springs, clear springs and a small resort. In 1902, Mr. Lasell built a 2-inch galvanized pipe from the spring to a bottling plant in downtown Martinez across from the train station, approximately 6 miles (10 km). The Alhambra Water Company was born. As the business grew, glass-lined railcars were used to carry water to bottling plants in Oakland and San Francisco. Today, Alhambra Water comes from elsewhere.

Residential development has spread from downtown Martinez up the watershed: in the 1920s, it reached up the valley to Highway 4, in the 1960s it spread south of Highway 4 and up into Alhambra Valley, and in the 1980s and 1990s it moved into the hills in the upper watershed.

== Geology ==
The geology of the Alhambra Creek watershed has shaped and continues to shape the landscape. The bedrock of the area was originally deposited as layers of sand and mud in the deep ocean. Over time, from nearly 100 million years ago to 10 million years ago, layers of sediment accumulated, were buried, compressed and turned to rock. Later, these rocks were folded and faulted and the east bay hills uplifted. As the hills rose, erosion cut away at the rocks, carving valleys in the soft shales and leaving the harder sandstones as hills. The Briones Formation and several other geologic units have common seashell fossils, telling us they began as layers of sand in a shallow sea. The Martinez formation is named for the town. The Hambre formation is named for Arroyo del Hambre Creek. Probably the most dramatic man-made geologic change is the extension of the stream floodplain into the bay, creating virtually all of the land now north of Main Street. This was built up of huge volumes of sediment coming down the Sacramento River as a result of hydraulic mining in the Sierra Nevada during the California Gold Rush, and probably increasing run-off from Alhambra Creek itself. Maps from 1850 show the shoreline meandering between Main and Escobar Streets. Along Alhambra Creek at Escobar Street in 1998, runoff eroded the stream bank revealing fresh, unweathered sand and silt about 10 feet (3 m) thick, probably reflecting gold rush era sedimentation. The entire area to the north is similarly new land deposited at the mouth of the stream.

== Habitat and conservation ==
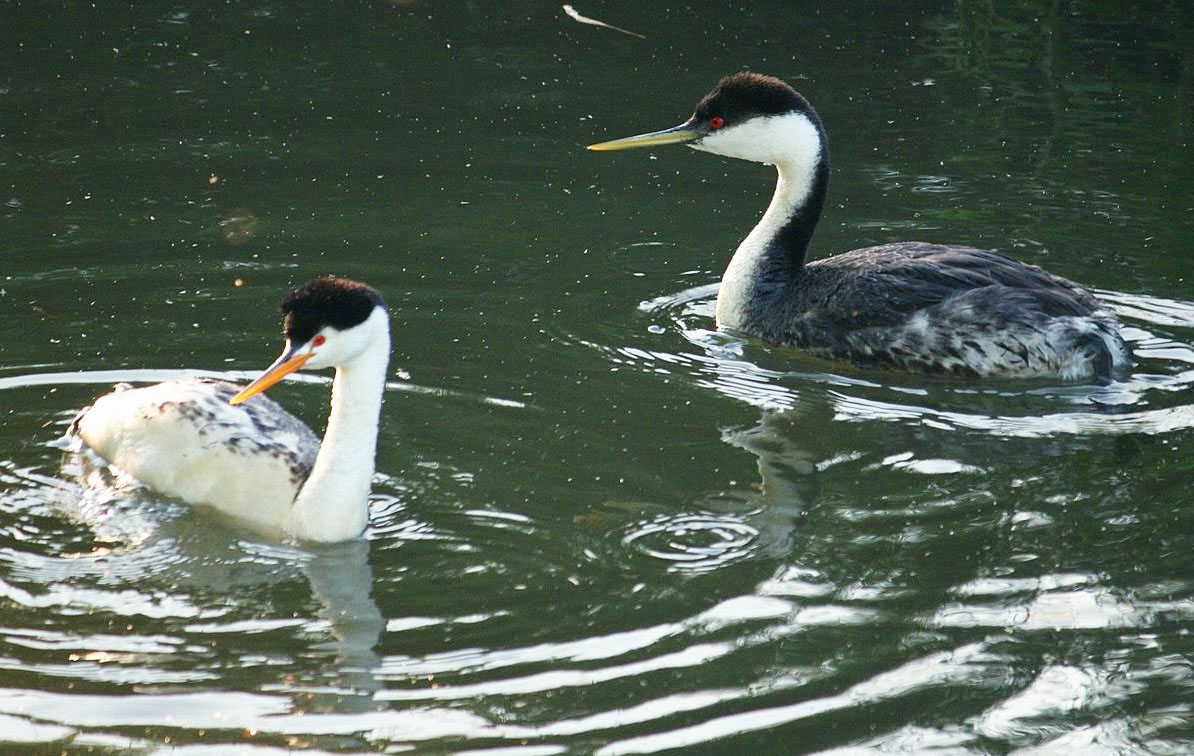
Western grebe (right) and Clark's grebe (left) swimming in beaver pond

Two plant communities each comprise about half of the Alhambra Creek watershed, coastal oak woodlands on north and east facing slopes and California annual grassland on drier high ridges and west and south facing slopes. The most common trees found in the oak woodlands are coast live oak, blue oak, valley oak, California bay laurel, toyon, and buckeye. In these woodlands, a wide variety of other plants grow beneath the trees, forming an understory. These plants include a variety of native and introduced grasses, herbaceous forbs, and small shrubs. Among the more common native understory plants are purple needle grass, soft chess grass, California yarrow, and poison oak. Native grasses that evolved over millions of years once dominated the grasslands of California. But changes in the fire frequency and intensity, the introduction of competitive grasses from the lands surrounding the Mediterranean Sea, and changes in the way the grasslands were grazed by animals led to a complete conversion in the species make-up of our grasslands. Now annual grasses introduced from Europe dominate California's grasslands, while the native grasses cover only a minor fraction of the grassland area. The grasslands of the Alhambra Creek watershed support a wide array of wildflowers as well. Many of these wildflowers grow best when grazed moderately by wildlife and livestock.

Deer use the dense woodlands for forage, cover and shade. Coyotes and mountain lions prey on the deer. A huge number of bird species utilize the trees and shrubs for food, cover, and nesting habitat. Skunks and raccoons also live in the coast live oak woodlands, feeding on small mammals (like mice), insects, and vegetation. The coast live oak woodland of the Alhambra Creek watershed also supports at least one mountain lion, which feeds upon the deer that live there. One frequently used feeding spot is located near Carquinez Scenic Drive, just west of the watershed boundary. The ground squirrel is a keystone species in the annual grasslands, serving as an important food source for the coyote, red-tailed hawk, kestrel, and golden eagle.

Along Alhambra Creek's riparian corridor, trees like willows, cottonwoods, sycamores, big-leaf maples and valley oaks dominate riparian areas. Growing underneath the trees are a variety of shrubs including elderberry, California blackberry, and California rose. The American beaver has recently recolonized Alhambra Creek and is a keystone species as its ponds support steelhead trout and other fish, birds, otter and mink. Historically, Alhambra Creek likely supported a population of salmon and steelhead, as was typical of free flowing Bay Area streams. The Martinez Packing Company was established in 1882 and canned and shipped about 350 cases of salmon per day. The local commercial fishery thrived on huge runs of salmon up the Sacramento/San Joaquin River system.

Coastal marsh is another type of plant community found at the mouth of Alhambra Creek. Above the mudflats salt grass and pickleweed dominate the marsh. The salt marsh harvest mouse, a state and federally listed species, lives in these areas. A number of shore birds also nest in the coastal marsh community. They build their nests on the ground since no trees can survive in the salty soils. That is why dogs are not allowed in the Martinez Regional Shoreline at the mouth of Alhambra Creek.

The area was formerly roamed by the California grizzly bear (Ursus arctos horribilis, subspecies: californicus) and the black bear (Ursus americanus). The sighting of black bears in the upper watershed area near Bear Creek Road was a common occurrence up to the 1930s and 1940s. By the 1950s however, it was generally assumed that the bears had all disappeared from the region. In 1965 however, a bear was hit by a car and killed on San Pablo Dam Road. The memory of this last bear in Contra Costa is now preserved as a bearskin rug on the floor of a ranch house in the area.

In 1997, watershed conservation began in earnest when the Alhambra Creek Watershed Council was established to produce the Alhambra Creek Watershed Management Plan (2001). The group's mission is to protect and enhance the health of the Alhambra Creek Watershed by educating the public about the watershed, acting as a community resource, and providing a forum for new ideas and projects. By representing diverse stakeholder interests and promoting healthy natural systems, AWC seeks the health and vitality of the entire watershed community. The county, Friends of Alhambra Creek, National Park Service, Muir Heritage Land Trust, residents, Martinez Planning Commission, and Alhambra Valley Improvement Association are all active participants.

=== Beavers ===
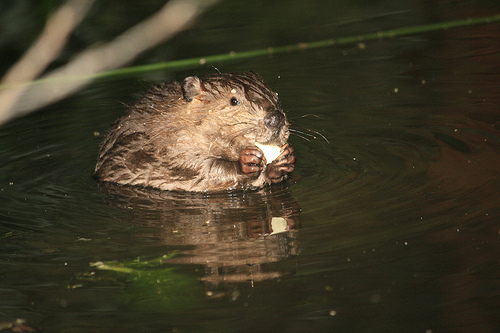
Three-week-old beaver kit swimming in Alhambra Creek c.June, 2010

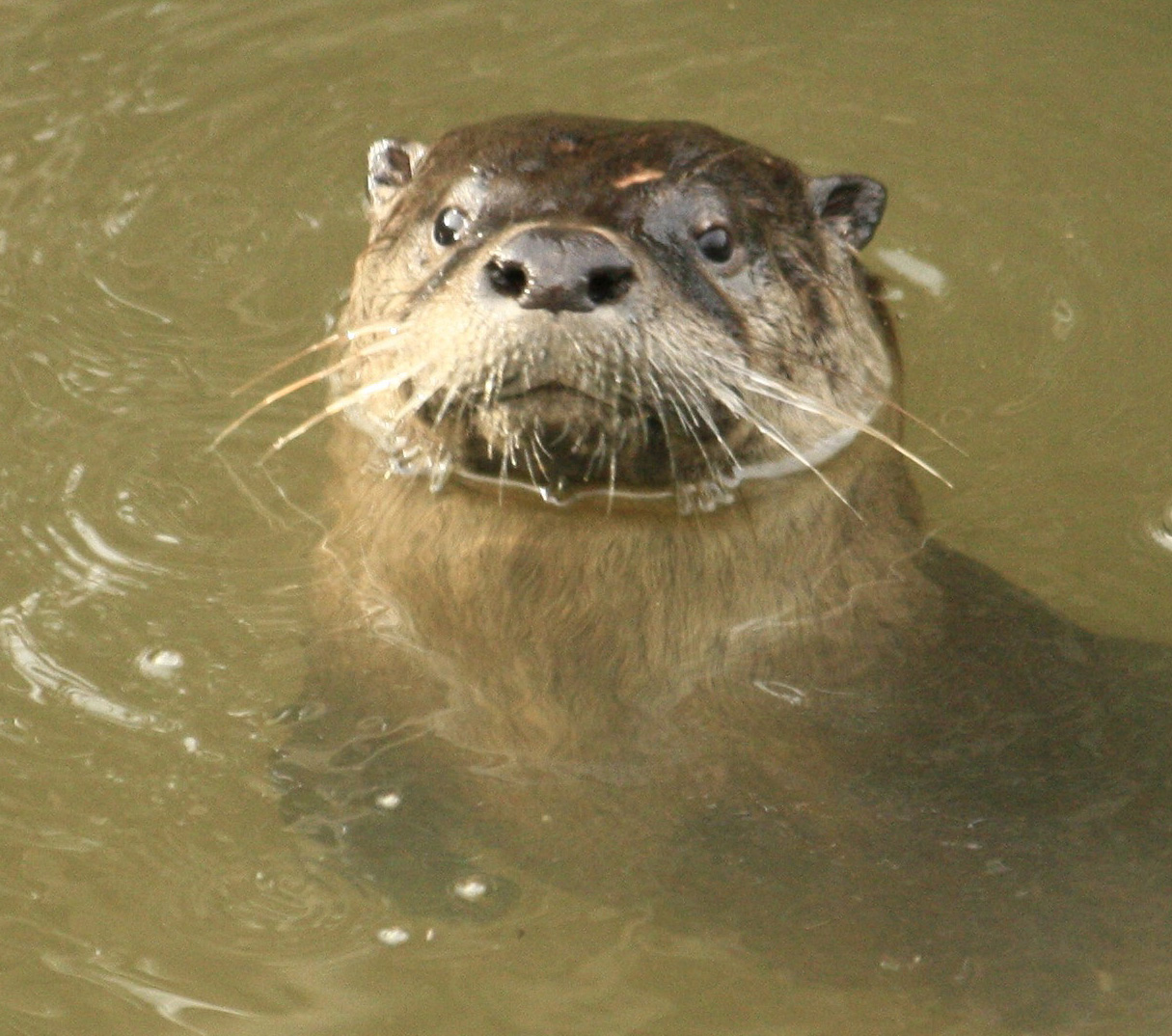
River otter returns to beaver pond c.2008

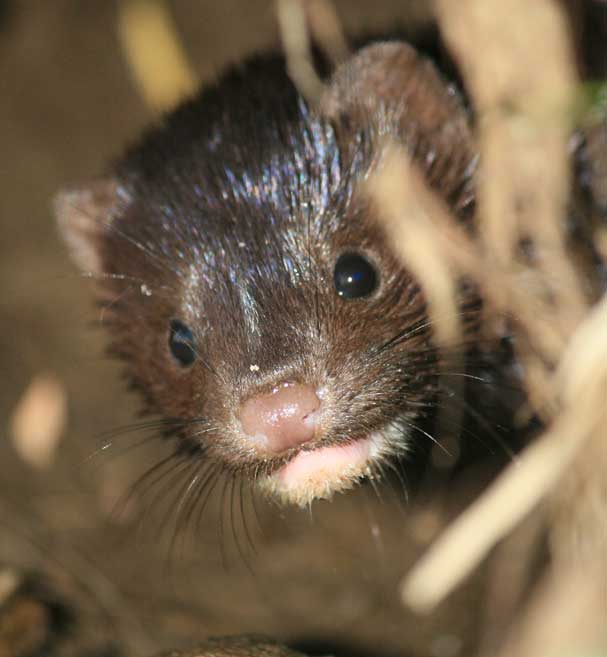
Mink returns to beaver pond c.2009

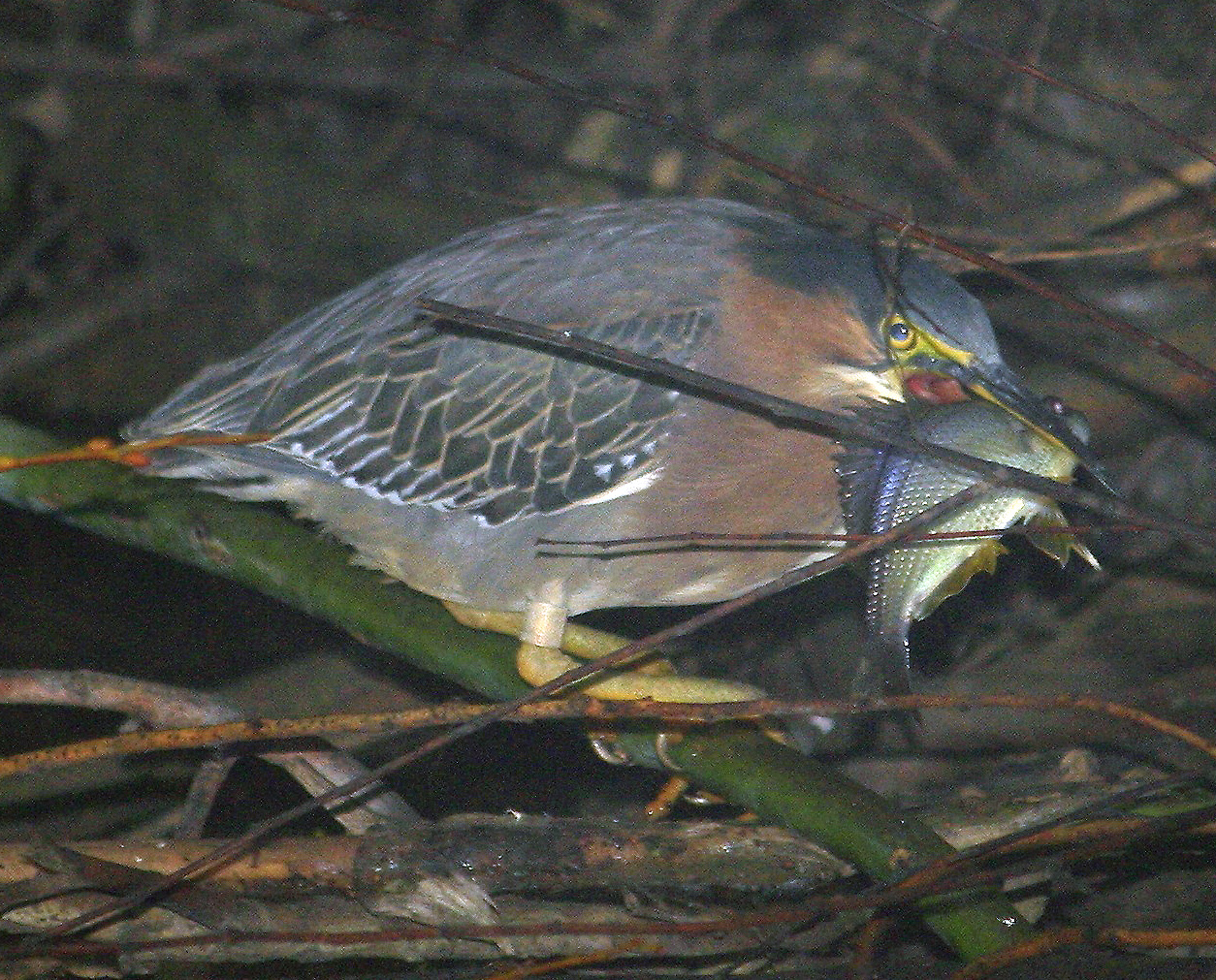
Green heron eating first recorded Sacramento splittail c.2010

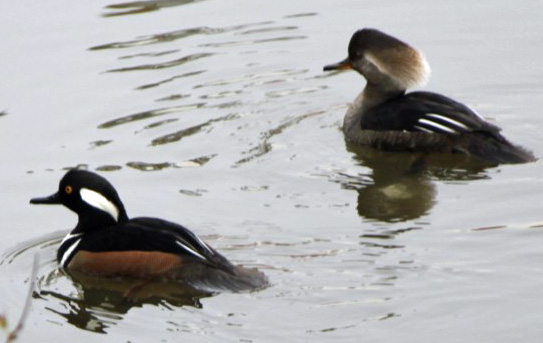
Hooded mergansers return to beaver pond December 2010

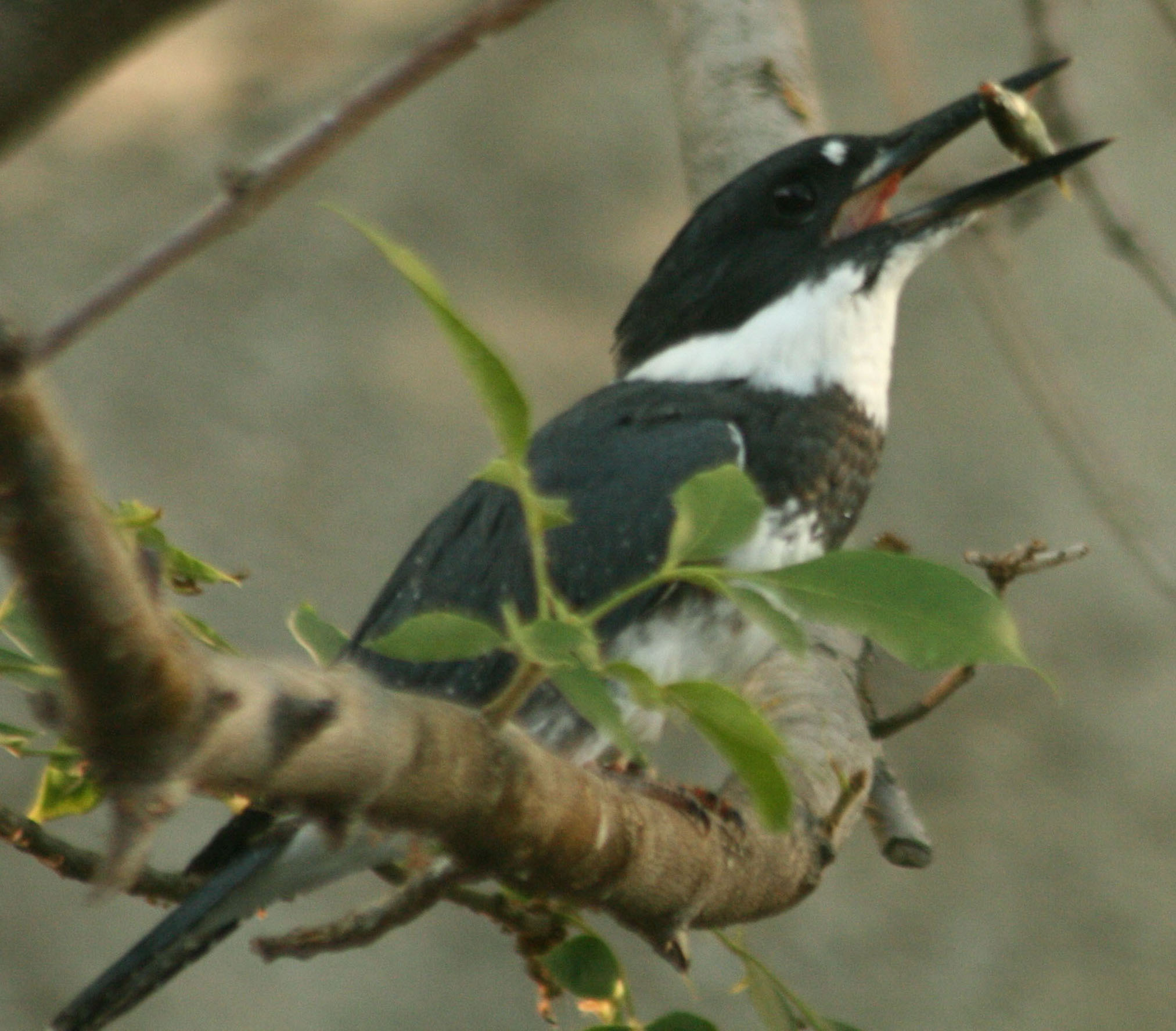
Belted kingfisher eating fish above beaver pond

In 2006, a male and female California golden beaver arrived in Alhambra Creek in downtown Martinez. The beavers built a dam 30 feet (9 m) wide and at one time 6 feet (2 m) high, and chewed through half the willows and other creekside landscaping the city planted as part of its US$9.7 million 1999 flood-improvement project. The City Council wanted to remove the beavers because of fears of flooding, ironically, as the worst flood since the flood control project was in 2005, two years before the beavers came. Local residents organized to protect them, forming an organization called Worth a Dam. Resolution included installing a flow device pipe through the beaver dam so that the pond's water level could not become excessive. Now protected, the beaver have transformed Alhambra Creek from a trickle into multiple dams and beaver ponds, which in turn, led to the return of numerous birds, steelhead trout (Oncorhynchus mykiss) and river otter (Lontra canadensis) in 2008, and mink (Neogale vison) in 2009. Examples of the impact of the beaver as a keystone species in 2010, include a green heron (Butorides virescens) catching a Sacramento splittail (Pogonichthys macrolepidotus), the first recorded sighting of the splittail fish in Alhambra Creek and the December arrival of a pair of hooded mergansers (Lophodytes cucullatus) (see photos). The beaver parents have produced babies every year since their 2006 arrival. However, in June, 2010, after birthing and successfully weaning triplets this year (and quadruplets the previous three years), "Mom Beaver" died of natural causes.

In November, 2009 the Martinez City Council approved the placement of an 81 tile wildlife mural on the Escobar Street bridge. The mural was created by schoolchildren and donated by Worth a Dam to memorialize the beavers and other fauna in Alhambra Creek.

The Martinez beavers probably originated from the Sacramento-San Joaquin River Delta. Historically, before the California Fur Rush of the late 18th and early 19th centuries, the Delta probably held the largest concentration of beaver in North America. It was California's early fur trade, more than any other single factor, that opened up the West, and the San Francisco Bay Area in particular, to world trade. The Spanish, French, English, Russians and Americans engaged in the California fur trade before 1825, harvesting prodigious quantities of beaver, river otter, marten, fisher, mink, fox, weasel, harbor and fur seals and sea otter. When the coastal and oceanic fur industry began to decline, the focus shifted to California's inland fur resources. Between 1826 and 1845 the Hudson's Bay Company sent parties out annually from Fort Astoria and Fort Vancouver into the Sacramento and the San Joaquin valleys as far south as French Camp on the San Joaquin River. These trapping expeditions must have been extremely profitable to justify the long overland trip each year. It appears that the golden beaver (castor canadensis, subspecies: subauratus) was one of the most valued of the animals taken, and apparently was found in great abundance. Thomas McKay reported that in one year the Hudson's Bay Company took 4,000 beaver skins on the shores of San Francisco Bay. At the time, these pelts sold for US$2.50 a pound or about US$4.00 each. The Delta area incidentally, is probably where McKay was so successful, rather than the Bay itself. In 1840, explorer Captain Thomas Farnham wrote that beaver were very numerous near the mouths of the Sacramento and San Joaquin rivers and on the hundreds of small "rushcovered" islands. Farnham, who had travelled extensively in North America, said: "There is probably no spot of equal extent in the whole continent of America which contains so many of these muchsought animals."

== See also ==
- List of watercourses in the San Francisco Bay Area
- Martinez beavers
- Martinez, California
