= Selby, California =

Unincorporated community in California, United States

Selby
- Unincorporated community
- Location in California
- Coordinates: 38°03′24″N 122°14′38″W
- Country: United States
- State: California
- County: Contra Costa
- Elevation: 20 ft (6 m)
- GNIS ID: 1659623
- FIPS code: 06-70868

Selby is an unincorporated community in Contra Costa County, in the East Bay region of the San Francisco Bay Area in northern California, United States.

== Geography ==
The town is located on the Carquinez Strait where its enters San Pablo Bay, across from Vallejo. The town at an elevation of 20 feet (6 m).

It is next to Rodeo, on the Southern Pacific Railroad, and 6.5 miles (10.5 km) west-northwest of Martinez.

== History ==
Selby is located on the 19th century Mexican land grant Rancho El Pinole site, that was made to Ygnacio Martinez.

A post office operated at Selby from 1886 to 1967. The name honors Prentiss Selby, its first postmaster.

Al Zampa, a bridge construction worker who played an integral role in the construction of numerous San Francisco Bay Area bridges, was born here in 1905. The suspension bridge unit of the twin Carquinez Bridge is officially called the Alfred Zampa Memorial Bridge, completed in 2003 to the east of town.
