= Cañada del Cierbo =

Stream in California, US

Cañada del Cierbo Creek Arroyo de Pescadero
- Location of mouth

Location
- Country: United States
- State: California
- Region: Contra Costa County

Physical characteristics
- Source: Crockett Hills Regional Park, in the northwest Berkeley Hills
  - location: 1.5 mi (2 km) south of Crockett
  - coordinates: 38°01′46″N 122°12′44″W
  - elevation: 600 ft (180 m)
- Mouth: Eastern San Pablo Bay38°03'10.3"N 122°15'08.2"W
  - location: San Pablo Bay at Tormey
  - coordinates: 38°03′10″N 122°15′08″W
  - elevation: 0 ft (0 m)
- Length: 9 mi (14 km)

Canada del Cierbo is a valley and 2.5-mile-long (4.0 km) northwestward-flowing stream originating in the Crockett Hills Regional Park and flowing to eastern San Pablo Bay near the Carquinez Strait at Tormey, Contra Costa County, California.

== History ==
"Cierbo" is derived from the Spanish word 'Ciervo' for 'Elk' (Cervus canadensis), the creek apparently named for elk herds native to the area.

== Watershed and Course ==
Cañada del Cierbo Creek is a 2.5 miles (4.0 km) stream beginning in Crockett Hills Regional Park in the extreme northwest Berkeley Hills. It flows northwest to San Pablo Bay, with its mouth at Tormey, California, 6.5 miles (10.5 km) west northwest of Martinez, California. There are no named tributaries. The lower reach of Cañada del Cierbo Creek downstream of Interstate 80 is diverted underneath refinery properties.
