= Alhambra Valley, California =

Alhambra Valley
- census-designated place
- Position in California.
- Coordinates: 37°58′07″N 122°08′11″W
- Country: United States
- State: California
- County: Contra Costa (Briones Hills)

Area
  - Total: 1.61 sq mi (4.18 km^{2})
  - Land: 1.61 sq mi (4.18 km^{2})
  - Water: 0 sq mi (0.00 km^{2}) 0%
- Elevation: 525 ft (160 m)

Population (2020)
  - Total: 805
  - Density: 498.6/sq mi (192.51/km^{2})
- Time zone: UTC-8 (Pacific (PST))
  - Summer (DST): UTC-7 (PDT)
- FIPS code: 06-00898
- GNIS feature ID: 2582930

Alhambra Valley (/ɑːlˈhɑːmbrə/, Spanish: [aˈlambɾa]) is a census-designated place in the Briones Hills of central Contra Costa County, California, United States. Alhambra Valley sits at an elevation of 525 feet (160 m). The 2020 United States census reported that Alhambra Valley's population was 805. The Spanish name of the valley was Cañada del Hambre "Valley of Hunger"; it was adapted into English with obvious influence from "Alhambra".

== Geography ==
According to the United States Census Bureau, the CDP has a total area of 1.61 square miles (4.18 km^{2}), all land.

== Demographics ==
Historical population
Census	Pop.	Note	%±
2010	924		—
2020	805		−12.9%
U.S. Decennial Census; 1860–1870 1880-1890; 1900 1910 1920; 1930 1940 1950; 1960 1970 1980; 1990 2000 2010

Alhambra Valley first appeared as a census designated place in the 2010 U.S. census.

=== 2020 census ===
As of the 2020 census, Alhambra Valley had a population of 805, with a population density of 498.8 inhabitants per square mile (192.6/km^{2}). The median age was 53.1 years. The age distribution was 17.6% under the age of 18, 6.6% aged 18 to 24, 16.6% aged 25 to 44, 31.4% aged 45 to 64, and 27.7% who were 65 years of age or older. For every 100 females there were 95.4 males, and for every 100 females age 18 and over there were 96.2 males age 18 and over.

The census reported that 100% of the population lived in households. 84.6% of residents lived in urban areas, while 15.4% lived in rural areas.

There were 308 households, of which 23.1% had children under the age of 18 living in them. Of all households, 66.9% were married-couple households, 3.9% were cohabiting couple households, 11.4% had a male householder with no partner present, and 17.9% had a female householder with no partner present. About 15.9% of all households were made up of individuals, and 11.0% had someone living alone who was 65 years of age or older. The average household size was 2.61. There were 252 families (81.8% of all households).

There were 319 housing units at an average density of 197.6 units per square mile (76.3 units/km^{2}), of which 308 (96.6%) were occupied. Of these, 93.2% were owner-occupied, and 6.8% were occupied by renters. Of all housing units, 3.4% were vacant; the homeowner vacancy rate was 0.7% and the rental vacancy rate was 19.2%.

Racial composition as of the 2020 census
Race	Number	Percent
White	631	78.4%
Black or African American	11	1.4%
American Indian and Alaska Native	3	0.4%
Asian	28	3.5%
Native Hawaiian and Other Pacific Islander	3	0.4%
Some other race	32	4.0%
Two or more races	97	12.0%
Hispanic or Latino (of any race)	100	12.4%

== Education ==
The CDP is served by Martinez Unified School District.
