= Rodeo, California =

- Census-designated place
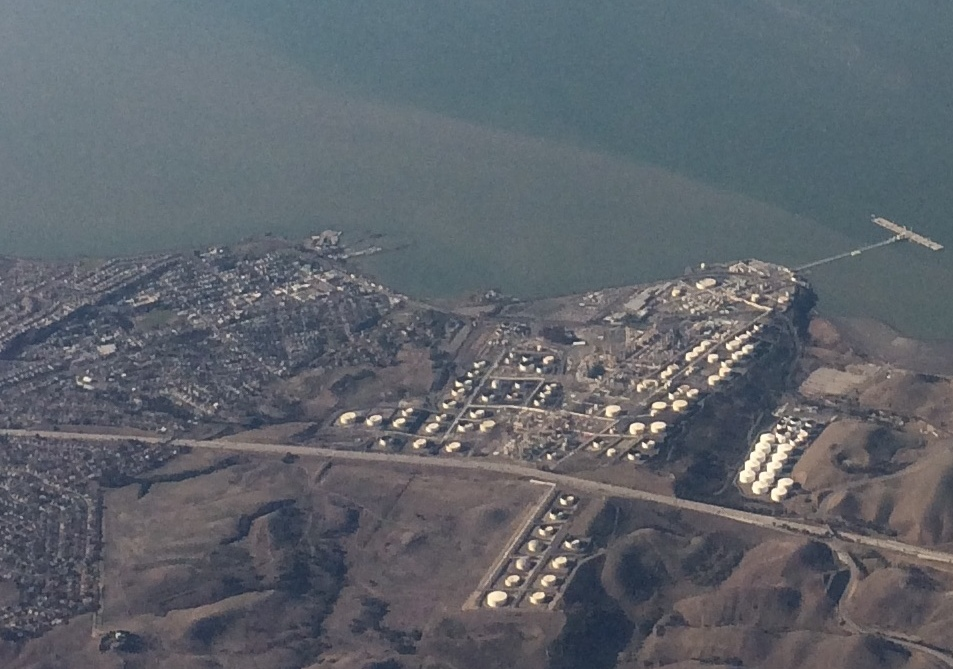
- Aerial view of Rodeo

- Location in Contra Costa County and the state of California
- Coordinates: 38°01′59″N 122°16′01″W
- Country: United States
- State: California
- County: Contra Costa

Government
  - State Senate: Jesse Arreguín (D)
  - State Assembly: Buffy Wicks (D)
  - U. S. Congress: John Garamendi (D)

Area
  - Total: 4.644 sq mi (12.03 km^{2})
  - Land: 3.761 sq mi (9.74 km^{2})
  - Water: 0.883 sq mi (2.29 km^{2}) 19.0%
- Elevation: 16 ft (4.9 m)

Population (2020)
  - Total: 9,653
  - Density: 2,567/sq mi (991.0/km^{2})
- Time zone: UTC-8 (PST)
  - Summer (DST): UTC-7 (PDT)
- ZIP codes: 94547, 94572
- Area codes: 510, 341
- FIPS code: 06-62490
- GNIS feature IDs: 1659538, 2409201

Rodeo (/roʊˈdeɪ.oʊ/; Spanish for "Cattle roundup") is a census-designated place (CDP) located in Contra Costa County, California, United States, in the East Bay sub-region of the San Francisco Bay Area, on the eastern shore of San Pablo Bay, 25 miles northeast of San Francisco. The population was 9,653 at the 2020 census. The place is named for the rodeos common in the late 19th century. Cattle from the surrounding hills were regularly driven down through the old town district to a loading dock on the shoreline of San Pablo Bay for shipment to slaughterhouses, a practice which continued through the early 20th century. Rodeo is served by the Interstate 80 freeway and State Route 4 and was formerly served by the first transcontinental railroad, which still passes through Rodeo. Rodeo has not been a stop on the railroad since the 1950s.

== History ==
Rodeo is located on tracts of land that were purchased by ranchers and businessmen John and Patrick Tormey from the Ygnacio Martinez Rancho El Pinole estate in 1865 and 1867.

In partnership with the Union Stockyard Co. in 1890, Patrick Tormey (for whom the nearby town of Tormey is named) sold some of the land to them and began to lay out plans and make large investments for the stockyard facilities for a meatpacking and canning industry. Eventually, streets were graded and lots were prepared for homesteads, creating the town of Rodeo.

Patrick Tormey also sold land in the nearby town of Oleum to the California Lumber Co. for use as a lumberyard (which eventually would be sold to the Union Oil Co. for an oil refinery site). He also sold land in nearby Selby, which was used by the Selby Smelting & Lead Co. He funded the meatpacking plant, corrals and the Rodeo Hotel.

The first post office opened in 1892.

After recession in 1893, Patrick Tormey struggled to keep finances going as business began to close, culminating with the bankruptcy of the Union Stockyard Co. Patrick Tormey was plagued with lawsuits over the bankruptcy for the remainder of his life. Residents were able to find work in nearby towns of Crockett (C&H Sugar), Vallejo (the Mare Island Naval Shipyard), Hercules (Hercules Powder Co.), and Union Oil Co. in Oleum.

Rodeo as a community managed to continue, but was devastated in the 1906 San Francisco earthquake. In the aftermath, the town would rebuild much like other communities around the San Francisco Bay area. There is a large oil refinery in Rodeo, built in 1896 and currently operated by Phillips 66.

== Geography ==
According to the United States Census Bureau, the CDP has a total area of 4.6 square miles (12 km^{2}), of which 81% is land and 19% is water.

== Demographics ==
Historical population
| Census | Pop. | Note | %± |
|---|---|---|---|
| 1970 | 5,356 | | — |
| 1980 | 8,286 | | 54.7% |
| 1990 | 7,589 | | −8.4% |
| 2000 | 8,717 | | 14.9% |
| 2010 | 8,679 | | −0.4% |
| 2020 | 9,653 | | 11.2% |
U.S. Decennial Census; 1860–1870 1880-1890; 1900 1910 1920; 1930 1940 1950; 1960 1970 1980; 1990 2000 2010; 2020

Rodeo first appeared as an unincorporated community in the 1970 U.S. census; and as a census-designated place in the 1980 United States census.

=== Racial and ethnic composition ===
Rodeo CDP, California – Racial and ethnic composition Note: the US Census treats Hispanic/Latino as an ethnic category. This table excludes Latinos from the racial categories and assigns them to a separate category. Hispanics/Latinos may be of any race.
| Race / Ethnicity (NH = Non-Hispanic) | Pop 2000 | Pop 2010 | Pop 2020 | % 2000 | % 2010 | % 2020 |
|---|---|---|---|---|---|---|
| White alone (NH) | 3,936 | 2,890 | 2,363 | 45.15% | 33.30% | 24.48% |
| Black or African American alone (NH) | 1,384 | 1,370 | 1,400 | 15.88% | 15.79% | 14.50% |
| Native American or Alaska Native alone (NH) | 50 | 31 | 30 | 0.57% | 0.36% | 0.31% |
| Asian alone (NH) | 1,389 | 1,727 | 2,265 | 15.93% | 19.90% | 23.46% |
| Native Hawaiian or Pacific Islander alone (NH) | 41 | 62 | 70 | 0.47% | 0.71% | 0.73% |
| Other race alone (NH) | 28 | 20 | 94 | 0.32% | 0.23% | 0.97% |
| Mixed race or Multiracial (NH) | 400 | 445 | 572 | 4.59% | 5.13% | 5.93% |
| Hispanic or Latino (any race) | 1,489 | 2,134 | 2,859 | 17.08% | 24.59% | 29.62% |
| Total | 8,717 | 8,679 | 9,653 | 100.00% | 100.00% | 100.00% |

=== 2020 census ===
As of the 2020 census, Rodeo had a population of 9,653. The population density was 2,566.6 inhabitants per square mile (991.0/km^{2}). The median age was 39.3 years. 22.1% of residents were under the age of 18 and 16.2% were 65 years of age or older. For every 100 females, there were 95.3 males, and for every 100 females age 18 and over, there were 92.4 males age 18 and over.

The census reported that 98.1% of the population lived in households, 1.8% lived in noninstitutionalized group quarters, and 0.1% were institutionalized. 99.8% of residents lived in urban areas, while 0.2% lived in rural areas.

There were 3,120 households, out of which 35.1% had children under the age of 18 living in them. Of all households, 47.9% were married-couple households, 5.8% were cohabiting couple households, 28.6% had a female householder with no spouse or partner present, and 17.7% had a male householder with no spouse or partner present. 21.2% of households were one person, and 9.3% were one person aged 65 or older. The average household size was 3.04. There were 2,280 families (73.1% of all households).

There were 3,202 housing units at an average density of 851.4 units per square mile (328.7 units/km^{2}), of which 3,120 (97.4%) were occupied and 82 (2.6%) were vacant. Of occupied units, 62.4% were owner-occupied and 37.6% were occupied by renters. The homeowner vacancy rate was 0.7% and the rental vacancy rate was 2.2%.

=== Demographic estimates ===
In 2023, the US Census Bureau estimated that 22.7% of the population were foreign-born. Of all people aged 5 or older, 66.2% spoke only English at home, 15.8% spoke Spanish, 4.9% spoke other Indo-European languages, 11.5% spoke Asian or Pacific Islander languages, and 1.7% spoke other languages. Of those aged 25 or older, 84.3% were high school graduates and 27.0% had a bachelor's degree.

=== Income and poverty ===
The median household income was $88,819, and the per capita income was $38,287. About 8.4% of families and 10.2% of the population were below the poverty line.

== Education ==
Rodeo is in the John Swett Unified School District.

The Rodeo Library of the Contra Costa County Library is located in Rodeo.

== Notable people ==
Rodeo is the hometown of the following:

- Billie Joe Armstrong (guitar, lead vocals) and Mike Dirnt (bass, backing vocals) of punk rock band Green Day
- Lefty Gomez, Hall of Fame pitcher for the New York Yankees (active 1930–1943)
- Eric the Actor of The Howard Stern Show
- Sabrina Rogers – Two-time Grammy winner, trumpet player with the Mariachi Divas de Cindy Shea
