= Rancho El Pinole =

Mexican land grant in California

Coordinates: 38.020°N 122.260°W

Rancho El Pinole was a 17,761-acre (71.88 km^{2}) Mexican land grant along Carquinez Strait in present-day Contra Costa County, California.

It was given in 1842 by Governor Juan Alvarado to Ygnacio Martinez, a Californio military commander and politician. Rancho El Pinole extended over land that today includes most of the Franklin Ridge and towns of Crockett, Hercules, Martinez, Oleum, Pinole, Rodeo, Selby and Tormey.

== History ==
Ygnacio Martínez (1774–1848) was commandant of the Presidio of San Francisco from 1822–1827, and again from 1828–1832. He was a member of the town council in 1824 and 1827. Martinez retired in 1831.

In 1834 Martinez appealed to Mexican authorities, saying that he had lost his title papers for a land grant made to him by Governor Luís Antonio Argüello in 1823 for his military service. He said the grant was known as Pinole y Cañada del Hambre. Record evidence was not found to support his claim, and he was required to petition anew, which he did in 1837. While proceedings were pending upon the Martinez petition, Felipe Briones in 1839, also petitioned for a grant of El Pinole. In 1842, Governor Alvarado, made a four square-league grant of Rancho El Pinole to Ygnacio Martinez, and a three square-league grant of Rancho Boca de la Cañada del Pinole to Briones.

Martínez did not move his family to the rancho until 1836, living until that time at the Pueblo of San José. To fulfill the requirements upon which grants were made by the government, he proceeded to build a home and other homes of adobe in the valley of Pinole about two and half miles from San Pablo Bay. Martinez occupied and cultivated a large portion of the land, including setting up a vineyard and fruit orchards.

When Martinez died in 1848, his eleven children inherited his property. His daughter, Maria A. Martinez, was married to William A. Richardson. Martinez's daughter, Susana, was married to Colonel William M. Smith.

Following the Mexican-American War and the cession of California to the United States, the 1848 Treaty of Guadalupe Hidalgo provided that the existing Mexican land grants would be honored by the United States. Grantees were required to file claims for their properties under the Land Act of 1851. The Martinez descendants did so with the Public Land Commission in 1852, and the grant was patented to María Antonia Martínez de Richardson et al. in 1868.

In 1849, William M. Smith established the town site of Martinez on 120 acres (0.5 km^{2}) of the family land grant. Later the heirs of William Welch of the adjacent Rancho Las Juntas, who owned the property on the east side of Arroyo del Hambre (Alhambra Creek), contributed another 500 acres (2.0 km^{2}) to be included in the new town.

In 1865, John Tormey purchased 2,000 acres (8.1 km^{2}) of the Rancho El Pinole from some of the Martinez heirs. Two years later in 1867, John Tormey and his brother Patrick purchased an additional 7,000 acres (28.3 km^{2}) from the Martinez heirs.

The Tormey brothers divided their purchase into two portions. John Tormey took the western half, which encompassed Pinole and additional parts of the Pinole and Briones valleys. Patrick Tormey's share to the north and east included the Rodeo Valley and what would eventually become the towns of Rodeo, Oleum, Selby and Tormey.

== Historic sites ==
- Vicente Martinez Adobe. A two-story adobe ranch house built in 1849 by Ygnacio Martinez's son Vicente J. Martínez. In 1853, Vicente sold the adobe to settler Edward Franklin. The canyon where the house was located was named Franklin Canyon after him. The historic house became known as the Franklin Canyon Adobe.
- Samuel Tennent House. The 1851 home of Dr. Samuel J. Tennent, an early Anglo-American settler in Contra Costa County, who married Ygnacio Martinez’s daughter Rafaela. Through his wife Rafaela's inheritance of part of the land grant, Tennent came to own and control much of the land in the area.
- Fernandez Mansion. This was constructed by Bernardo Fernandez, a Portuguese immigrant who succeeded with his trading facility in the 1850s and built this mansion.
