= Chelsea Wetlands =

Marsh and wetland in Contra Costa County, California

Coordinates: 38.0143°N 122.295°W

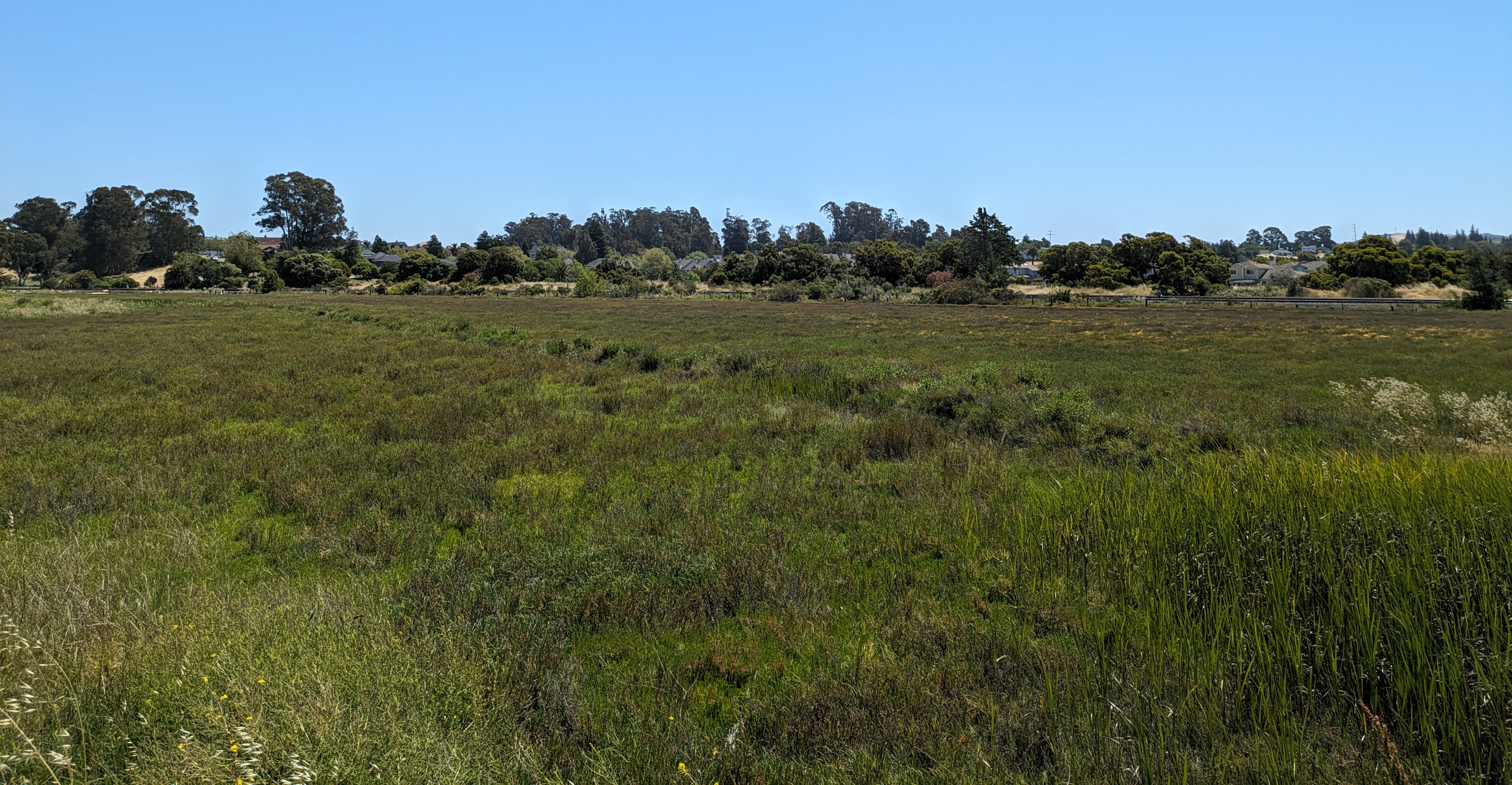
Chelsea Wetlands

Chelsea Wetlands is a riparian marsh on lower Pinole Creek and a tidal wetland at its mouth on San Pablo Bay, in Contra Costa County, northern California. It is located in the Hercules/Pinole area, in the East Bay region of the San Francisco Bay Area.

== History ==
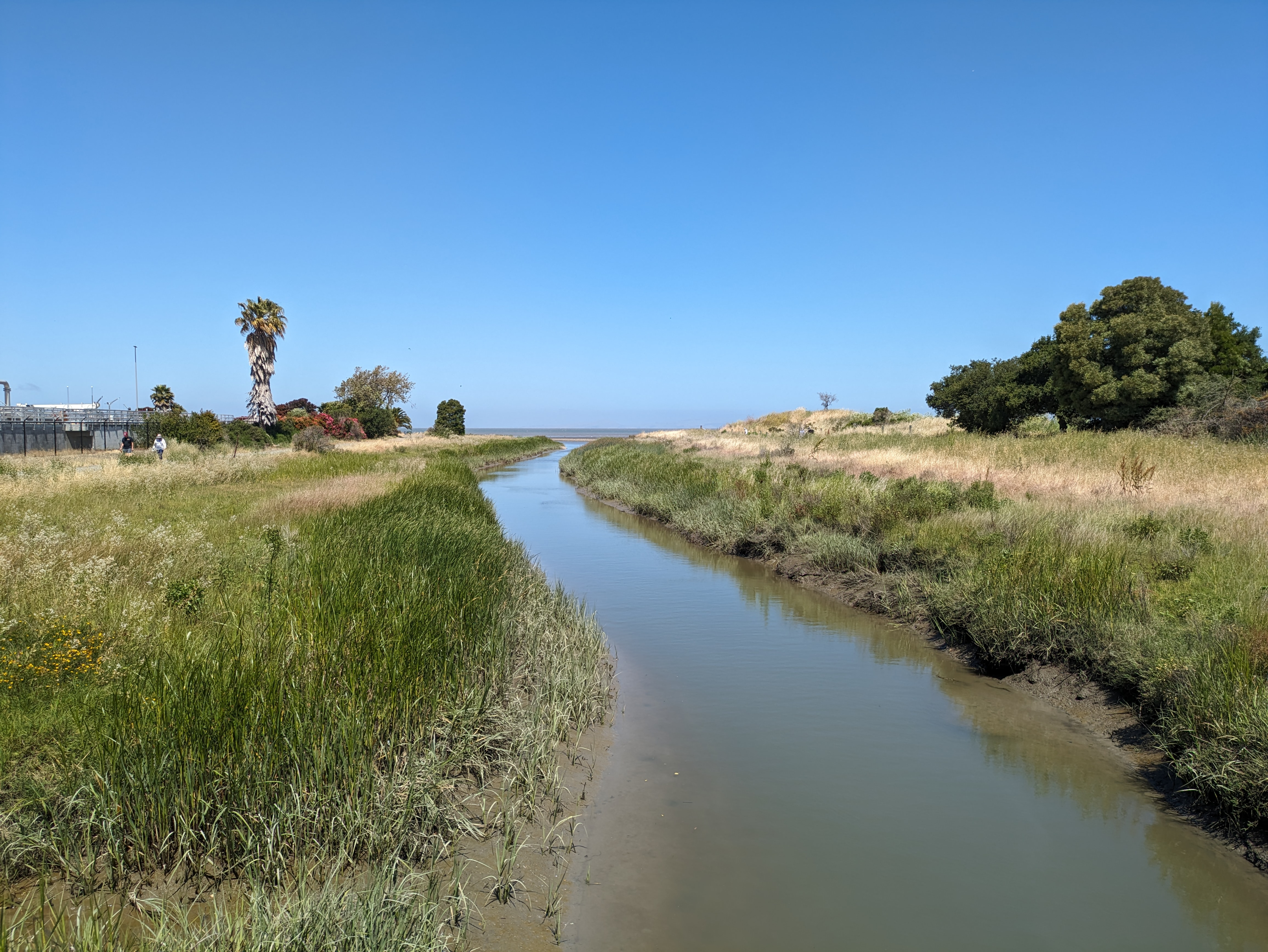
Lower Pinole Creek

Originally part of a much larger tidal marsh complex that fringed San Pablo Bay, including along the shoreline of West Contra Costa County. The Chelsea wetlands are the remaining 12 acres (4.9 ha) of undeveloped coastal marsh between Hercules and Pinole. The seasonal marsh was diked off and a large portion of it filled sometime in the late 19th/early 20th century during the development of the Pinole/Hercules area. It has been further degraded by the dumping of soil from more recent surrounding construction projects.

== Ecology ==
The Chelsea Wetlands remains crucial habitat to wildlife including endangered species such as the California clapper rail and salt marsh common yellowthroat. It was once home to egrets.

Hercules was seeking to restore funds for habitat restoration of lower Pinole Creek in 2012, to protect against flooding into the adjacent city neighborhood, and to restore tidal marsh, floodplain storage, and floodplain habitat functions — to support the flora and fauna native to the Chelsea Wetlands in the riparian zone and the bottom land tidal flood plain.

The San Francisco Bay Trail goes through the area along San Pablo Bay.

== See also ==
- Wetlands of the San Francisco Bay Area
