= Alice Briones =

American osteopathic physician

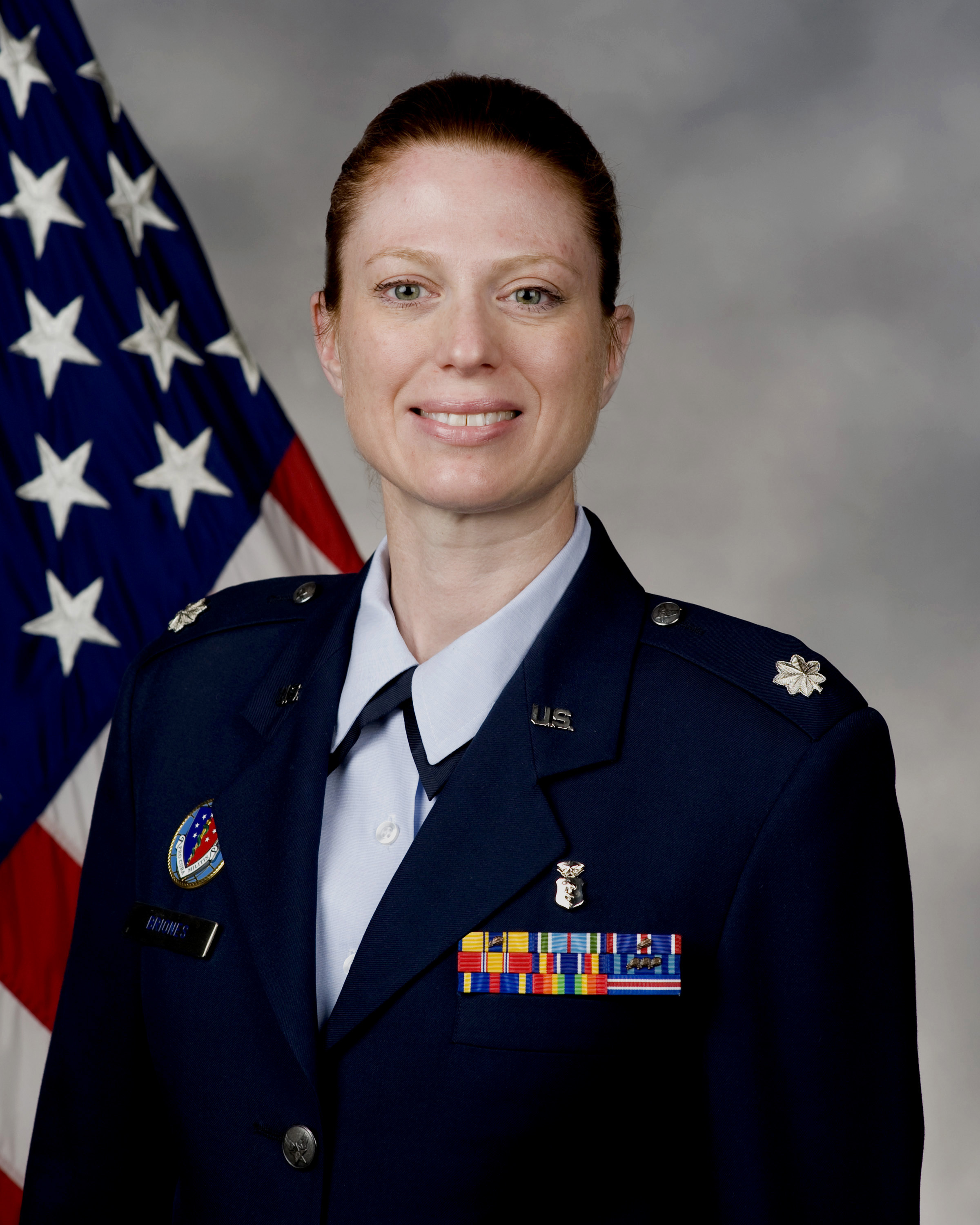
- Briones in 2017
- Education: University of Maine; Lake Erie College of Osteopathic Medicine
- Scientific career
- Fields: Osteopathic medicine, forensic pathology
- Workplaces: United States Air Force

Alice J. Briones is an American osteopathic physician serving as the chief medical examiner of Maine since 2024. She is a retired U.S. Air Force colonel who was director of the Armed Forces Medical Examiner System.

== Life ==
Briones is from Hampden, Maine. She enlisted in the U.S. Army as a combat medic in 1990 and completed basic training at Fort Jackson. She attended the University of Maine, earning a B.A. in clinical laboratory medicine in 1994 and earned certification as a medical technologist. In 1995, Briones was commissioned in the United States Air Force as a biomedical sciences corps laboratory officer.

Briones was an assistant chief of lab operations and squadron section commander at Luke Air Force Base and chief of lab operations at Hanscom Air Force Base. She received the Health Profession Scholarship Program from the Air Force and attended the Lake Erie College of Osteopathic Medicine, and graduated with a Doctor of Osteopathic Medicine in 2005. She completed a residency in clinical and anatomic pathology at the Strong Memorial Hospital from 2005 to 2009 and completed a forensic pathology fellowship with the Office of the Medical Examiner in Albuquerque, New Mexico, from 2009 to 2010.

Briones joined the Armed Forces Medical Examiner System (AFMES) as deputy medical examiner in Rockville, Maryland, in 2010, and Dover Air Force Base, and was appointed director of the DoD DNA Registry in 2014, coordinating services in both the Armed Forces Repository of Specimen Storage for Identification of Remains and the Armed Forces DNA Identification Laboratory. Briones became the AFMES deputy director in April 2017. She was named director of AFMES, effective February 21, 2020, making her the first female director. She succeeded Louis Finelli. She retired from the U.S. Air Force as a colonel. In April 2024, Briones was appointed by Maine governor, Janet Mills, as the state's chief medical examiner, succeeding Mark Flomenbaum.
