= Tormey, California =

Unincorporated community in California, United States

Tormey
- Unincorporated community
- Location in California
- Coordinates: 38°03′02″N 122°14′57″W
- Country: United States
- State: California
- County: Contra Costa
- Elevation: 20 ft (6 m)
- GNIS ID: 1660016
- FIPS code: 06-79058

Tormey, formerly known as El Cierbo from the (Spanish word 'Ciervo' for 'Elk' (Cervus canadensis), is an unincorporated community in Contra Costa County, California, United States. It is located between Rodeo and Crockett on the edge of the ConocoPhillips oil refinery in Rodeo. It is 6.5 miles (10 km) west-northwest of Martinez, at an elevation of 20 feet (6 m). The community is home to less than a dozen homes and the former offices of the John Swett Unified School District.

== History ==
Originally a company town for management and refinery workers at the Selby Smelter, American Smelting and Refining Company. Tormey is located astride old U.S. Route 40, now San Pablo Avenue. Old County Road offshoots from it and at the end there is a water reservoir. The former Southern Pacific Railroad and now its new owner since 1996, the Union Pacific Railroad, skirts the bayshore side of Tormey. In the 1940s and 1950s the Tormey Store served many of the grocery needs of the residents. The Hogg family managed the store, with its single gasoline pump, for many years. The town is named for Patrick Tormey, who purchased the property from the Ygnacio Martinez Rancho El Pinole estate.

A post office operated at Tormey from 1891 to 1892.

== Geography ==
Although the area is unincorporated, many times it is referred to as being in the Crockett hills. It is considered as part of Crockett. The ZIP Code is 94525. The community is inside area code 510. The mouth of Cañada del Cierbo Creek is located in Tormey.
