= Rancho Las Juntas =

Mexican land grant in California

Coordinates: 37.970°N 122.090°W

Rancho Las Juntas was a 13,293-acre (53.79 km^{2}) Mexican land grant in present day Contra Costa County, California given in 1844 by Governor Manuel Micheltorena to William Welch. The name Las Juntas translates as "the Crossroads". The grant was located between Ygnacio Martinez’ Rancho El Pinole and Salvio Pacheco’s Rancho Monte del Diablo, and included northwestern Walnut Creek, all of Pleasant Hill, and the eastern portion of Martinez. The original borders of the claim were defined as the straits to the north, "Las Juntas" (a junction of streams) to the south, the Walnut creek to the east, the Reliz ridge to the west, and, to the northwest, the Alhambra creek.

== History ==
William Welch (1798–1846) was born in Ireland, jumped ship in Northern California in 1821, and went to Los Angeles. After two years, he went north to the Pueblo of San Jose where he became a naturalized citizen (land case documents identify him as Guillermo Welch). He married in 1826, Maria Antonia Galindo, daughter of Juan Crisostomo Galindo of the Pueblo of San José. Her brother, Francisco Galindo married Maria Dolores Manuela Pacheco of Rancho Monte del Diablo, and later became one of the founders of Concord.

The three square league Rancho Las Juntas grant was made in 1844. About 1845 the Welch family decided to move permanently from San Jose to the Rancho. The oldest son was sent to build a home near the ruins of the adobe that had been burned by the Indians several years previously. But in 1846, before any improvements could be made, William Welch died. Welch's widow and children moved to the Rancho to join the oldest son.

With the cession of California to the United States following the Mexican-American War, the 1848 Treaty of Guadalupe Hidalgo provided that the land grants would be honored. As required by the Land Act of 1851, a claim for Rancho Las Juntas was filed by James Swansen, administrator of Welch's estate, with the Public Land Commission in 1852, and the grant was patented to the heirs of William Welch in 1870.

In 1852 Henry Bush purchased Welch land, approximately 600 acres along the eastern bank of Alhambra Creek and going south from approximately Brown Street in Martinez. He was the brother of Obadiah Bush, the ancestor of two US Presidents. His wife joined him soon after, bringing their family from the East Coast. In 1879 the widow Bush sold the northern 70 acres of their ranch to the Christian Brothers, where they built their seminary and grew grapes for wine production. In 1930, their land was sold for residential development.

In 1855 David and Martha Boss owned over 1,000 acres (4.0 km^{2}) in what is now Pleasant Hill. Judge F. M. Warmcastle had a farm of 300 acres (1.2 km^{2}), Colonel Lathrop had 945 acres (3.8 km^{2}) and Colonel Gift had 733 acres (3.0 km^{2}). William Hook (1805-1882), a Martinez businessman, bought his first land in 1854 and continued to add to his holdings until, in 1879, he owned 1,700 acres (6.9 km^{2}).

== See also ==
- Ranchos of Contra Costa County, California
