= Rocío Briones =

Spanish politician (born 1976)

Member of the Senate
- Incumbent
- Assumed office 28 July 2023
- Appointed by: Corts Valencianes

Personal details
- Born: 24 November 1976 (age 49)
- Party: Spanish Socialist Workers' Party

Rocío Briones Morales (born 24 November 1976) is a Spanish politician serving as a member of the Senate since 2023. From 2015 to 2023, she served as director general of the Valencian Employment and Training Service.
