= Briones Hills =

Location in the San Francisco Bay Area, California, United States

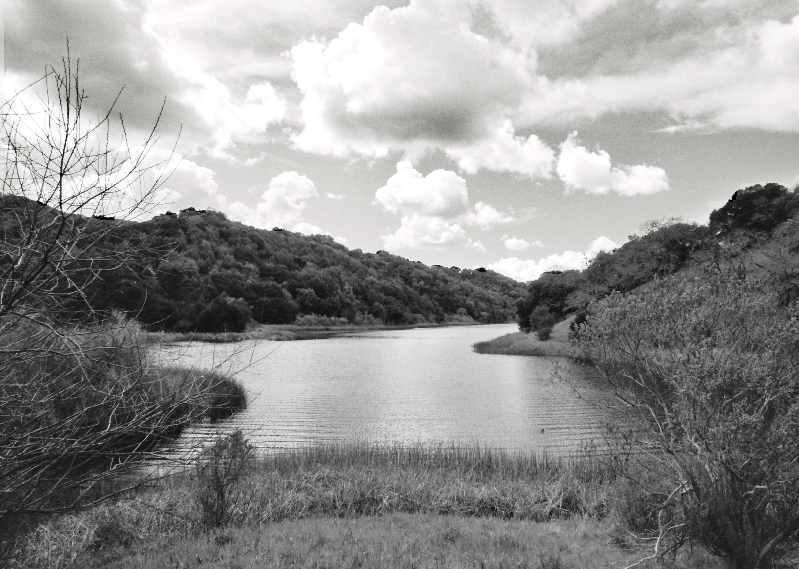
- Briones Reservoir in the Briones Hills

Highest point
- Elevation: 430 m (1,410 ft)

Geography
- Location within California Location within the United States
- Country: United States
- State: California
- District: Contra Costa County
- Range coordinates: 37°56′34.725″N 122°8′47.876″W
- Topo map: USGS Briones Valley

Geology
- Rock type(s): Inner Coast Ranges, California Coast Ranges System

The Briones Hills form a low mountain range in western Contra Costa County, in the East Bay region of the San Francisco Bay Area, California, United States. The Briones Hills are the northernmost portion of the East Bay Hills, which refers geologically to all of the ranges east of the Bay from the Hayward Fault in the west to the Calaveras Fault in the east. The United States Geological Survey (USGS) Geographic Names Information System, however, includes the Briones Hills as part of the Diablo Range in its list of GPS coordinates for the latter.

== Geography ==
The hills are in the Southern Inner Coast Ranges group of the California Coast Ranges System.

Cities and towns adjacent to or in the foothills of the range include: Briones, Lafayette, Martinez, Orinda, Pleasant Hill, Alhambra Valley, and Walnut Creek.

=== Features ===
Briones Regional Park, in the East Bay Regional Park District System, provides hiking trails for access. It also protects some of the range's California oak woodland, chaparral, and riparian habitats.

Briones Reservoir, of the East Bay Municipal Utility District (EBMUD), is located in the western area. It is impounded by Briones Dam on Bear Creek.

The headwaters of Pinole Creek are in the Briones Hills, on the western slope of Costa Peak. The headwaters of Alhambra Creek are in the hills within Briones Regional Park.

The privately owned enclave along Pinole Creek is also known simply as Briones.

== See also ==
- Mountain ranges of the San Francisco Bay Area
- Natural history of the California Coast Ranges
