= Patricia Briones =

Ecuadorian politician

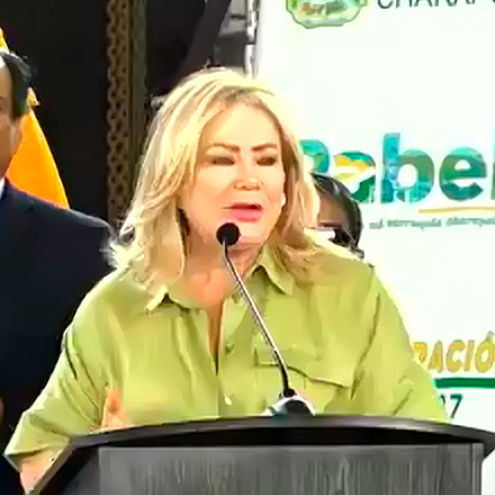

Mayor of Portoviejo
- In office 2005–2009
- Preceded by: Alberto Lara
- Succeeded by: Humberto Guillem

National Congress of Ecuador For Manabí
- In office 2002–2004

Personal details
- Born: Patricia Ignacia Briones Fernández; 18 October 1962 (age 63) Portoviejo
- Occupation: Politician

Patricia Ignacia Briones Fernández (born 18 August 1962) is an Ecuadorian politician. She was the first female mayor of Portoviejo.

== Political career ==
Briones was born in Portoviejo, Ecuador on 18 August 1962.

Briones entered public conscious as a beauty queen in 1976. Two years later, she was crowned the National Queen of Coffee. In the 2002 legislative election, Briones was elected an alternate deputy to Simón Bustamante, representing the Social Christian Party. She presented herself as a candidate for the office of Mayor of Portoviejo in the 2004 provincial elections, again for the Social Christian Party. With 31.71% of the vote, becoming the first woman to be the mayor of Portoviejo.

In early July 2005, Briones led a general strike of the city government to demand aid from the central government for aid with city projects. The strike ended when government ministers Rafael Correa and Wellington Sandoval agreed to grant the City of Portoviejo 62 million dollars for its projects. The city was paralysed for five days, costing six billion dollars and preventing entrance into the city via 25 barricades, making it the longest strike in the history of Manabí Province.

In the 2013 legislative election, Briones ran unsuccessfully for a seat in the National Assembly for the Avanza party.

In 2023 Briones was the president of the Civic Front of Manabí.
