= Briones Reservoir =

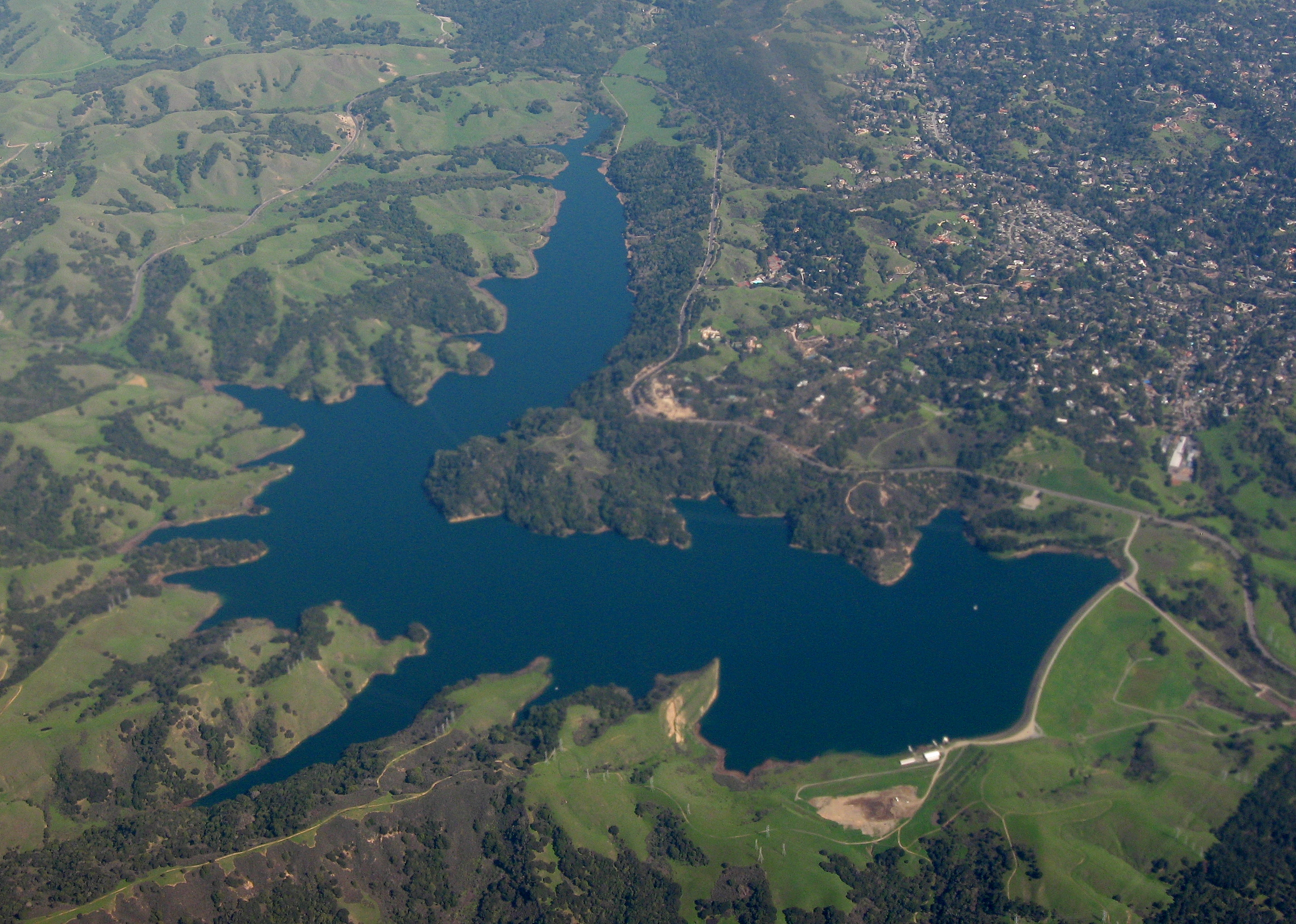

- Location within California Location within the United States
- Location: Briones Hills, Contra Costa County, California
- Coordinates: 37.915°N 122.205°W
- Lake type: Reservoir
- Primary outflows: Terminal (evaporation)
- Catchment area: 22 km^{2} (8.5 sq mi)
- Basin countries: United States
- Water volume: 60,510 acre⋅ft (74,640,000 m^{3})

Briones Reservoir is an open cut terminal water storage reservoir located in western Contra Costa County, in the East Bay region of the San Francisco Bay Area, California.

It is owned and operated by the East Bay Municipal Utility District (EBMUD).

== Geography ==
The reservoir is in the Briones Hills, on the west side of Briones Regional Park and northeast of Orinda. It is impounded by Briones Dam, an earthen dam completed in 1964 (62 years ago). The reservoir is the largest of EBMUD's five East Bay terminal reservoirs, with a total capacity of 60,510 acre⋅ft (74,640,000 m^{3}), and it has a total watershed of 8.59 square miles (22 km^{2}).

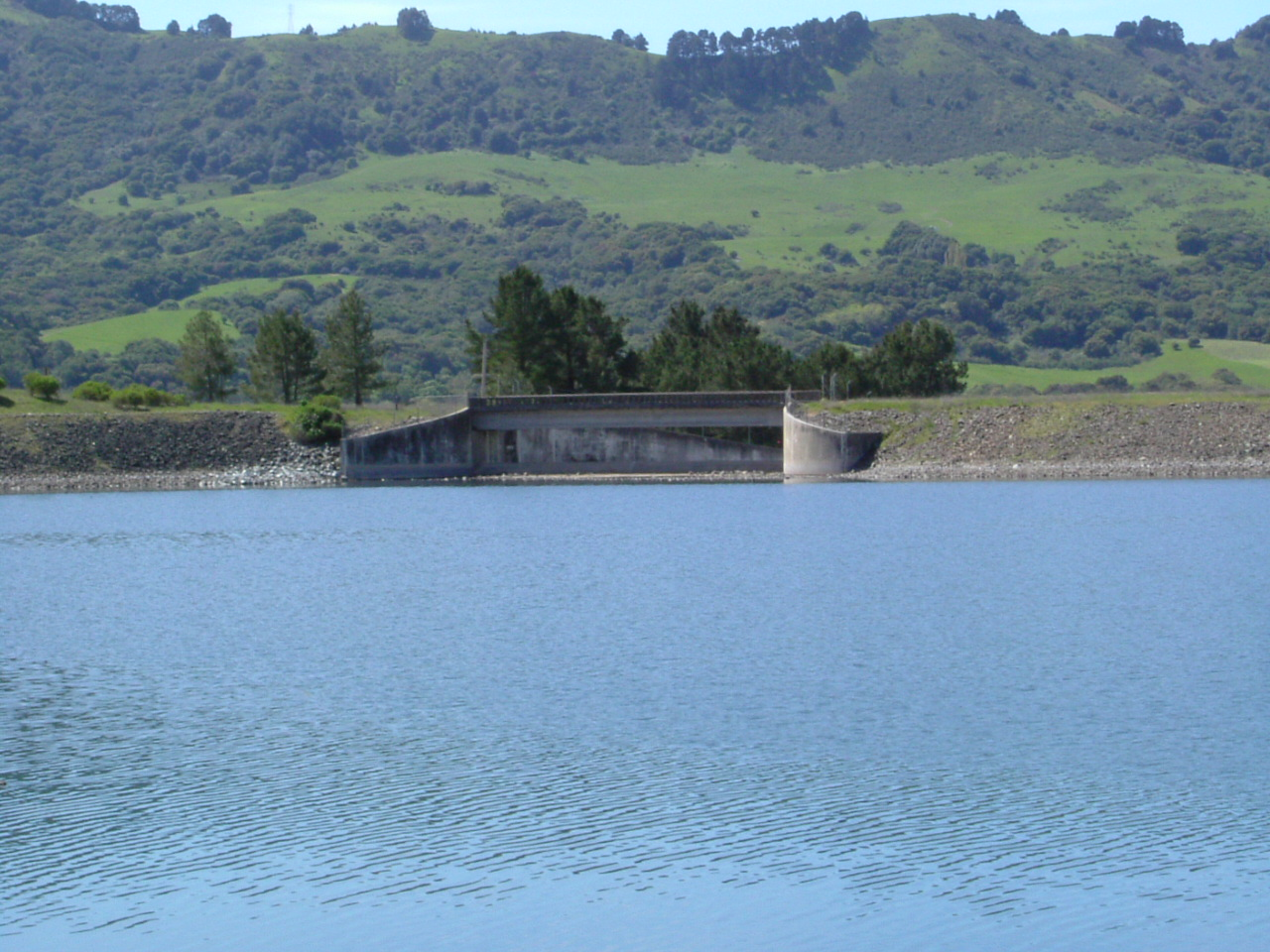
Briones Reservoir and Briones Dam in the Briones Hills.

== Water Source ==
The Briones Reservoir has two sources for its water, one local and one imported.

Its watershed of 22 km^{2} includes the Bear Creek drainage. Bear Creek formerly flowed down the valley, which the reservoir partially submerges, and still enters from the eastern section.

The major water source into the Briones Reservoir is imported from the Briones Diversion Works near Orinda. It is delivered through the Briones Aqueduct, a 7-foot, 6-inch steel pipe, operated by four pumps that can deliver up to 60 million gallons a day. This is water imported from EDMUD's biggest water source, the Mokelumne River in the San Joaquin Valley.

Water then leaves Briones Reservoir and flows to the lower part of the valley and into San Pablo Reservoir. From there, the water is distributed by a pumping plant in Kensington.

== Recreation ==
Because the water in the reservoir is mainly for human potable water uses, EBMUD is very strict about recreational activities. Fishing, swimming, and wading are not allowed. However, college rowing teams from Mills College, UC Berkeley and Saint Mary's College have permission to use the lake under certain rules, such as the inspection of all boats before use on the lake in order to prevent contamination.

Two trails, the Bear Creek Trail and the Oursan Trail, together form a 14-mile (23 km) hiking trail loop that circumnavigates the reservoir. The trailhead is at the Bear Creek Staging Area, which is within Briones Regional Park. A Trail Use Permit issued by EBMUD is required for all hikers, which can be obtained online at the EBMUD website for $10. No mountain biking is permitted on the trail. Horseback riding is allowed. Dogs are allowed on the Oursan Trail segment only, and must be leashed.

== See also ==
- List of dams and reservoirs in California
- List of lakes in the San Francisco Bay Area
