= Briones Valley =

Valley in California, United States

Coordinates: 37°54′50″N 122°12′30″W

The Briones Valley is a geological feature of Contra Costa County, California and runs between San Pablo Dam Road, to the west, and Reliez Valley Road, to the east. It is the seat of many riparian watersheds, especially of Alhambra Creek.
