= Briones Regional Park =

Park in California, United States

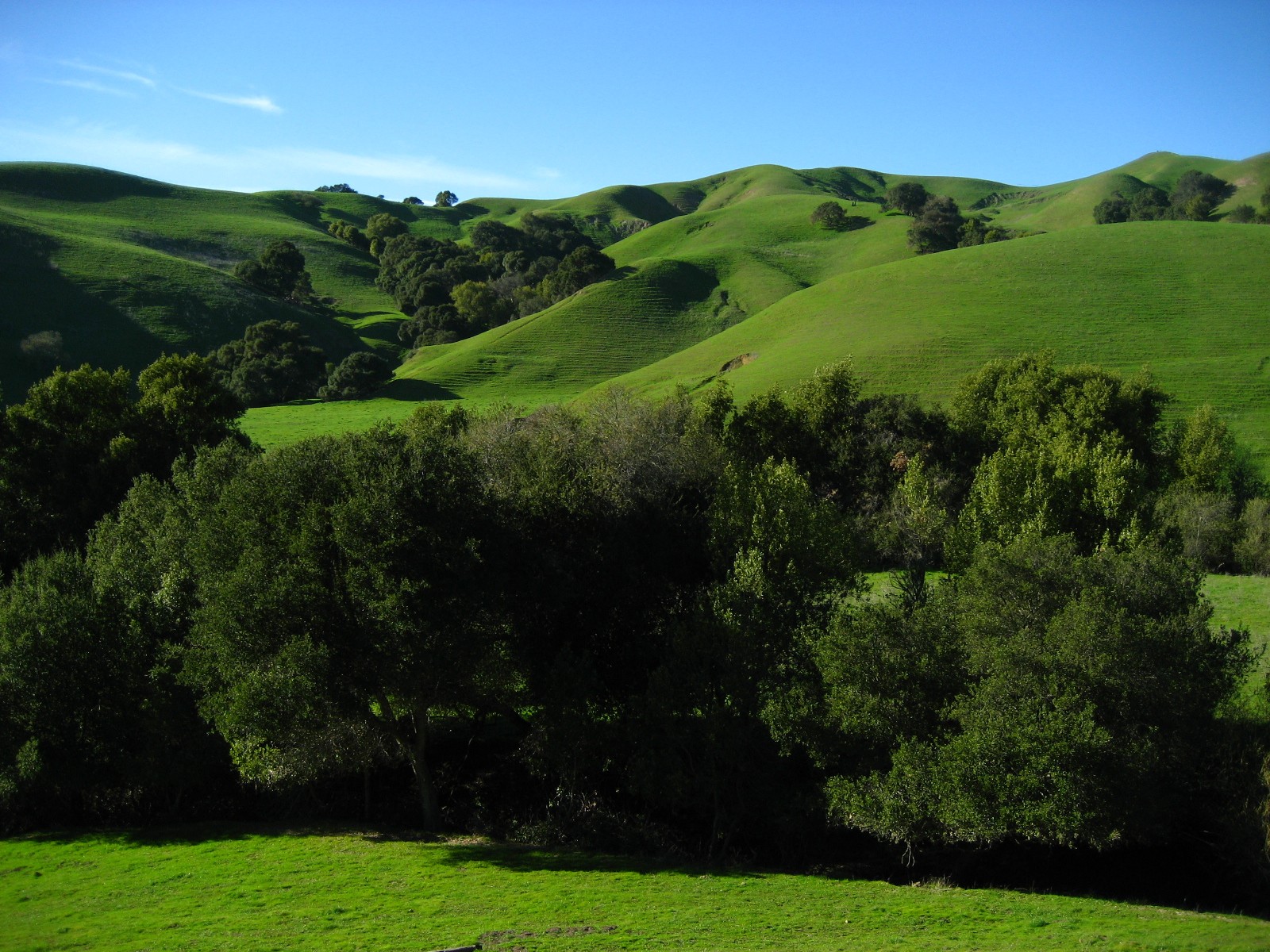
- Briones Hills in Briones Regional Park

- Location within Oakland, California Location within California Location within the United States
- Location: Briones Hills, Contra Costa County
- Coordinates: 37.935804°N 122.137413°W
- Area: 6,117-acre (24.75 km^{2})

Briones Regional Park is a 6,117-acre (24.75 km^{2}) regional park in the East Bay Regional Park District (EBRPD) system, located in the Briones Hills of central Contra Costa County of the San Francisco Bay Area in California.

== Geography ==
The park is located in rolling hills of the East Bay region, near Martinez, Lafayette, Walnut Creek, and Pleasant Hill. The western end of Briones Regional Park is adjacent to the Briones Reservoir, operated by EBMUD across Bear Creek Road.

Briones Peak is the highest point in the park with an elevation of 1483 ft (452 m), and offers panoramic views of Mount Diablo and the Diablo Valley to the east, the Sacramento River to the north, and the Berkeley Hills and Mount Tamalpais to the west.

The park is also home to many animals and birds, such as turkey vultures, black-tailed deer, cougars, coyotes, squirrels, and redtailed hawks. Cattle, sheep, and goat ranchers still use portions of the park for grazing purposes and hold a one hundred-year lease that is effective until the 2060s.

=== Lafayette Ridge ===
Lafayette Ridge is within Briones Park, and runs parallel to the city of Lafayette. The Lafayette Ridge Trail is approximately 2 miles (3.2 km) long. It begins at the parking lot of Springhill Elementary School and reaches the summit of Russel Peak at 1357 ft (414 m) in elevation, where it divides into the Russel Peak Trail and Briones Crest Trail. Several other trails branch off of the Lafayette Ridge Trail, most notably the Springhill and Buckeye Ranch Trails. The ridge's trails offer terrain for mountain biking, with periodic gains/descents of up to 200 ft (61 m) elevation.

== History ==
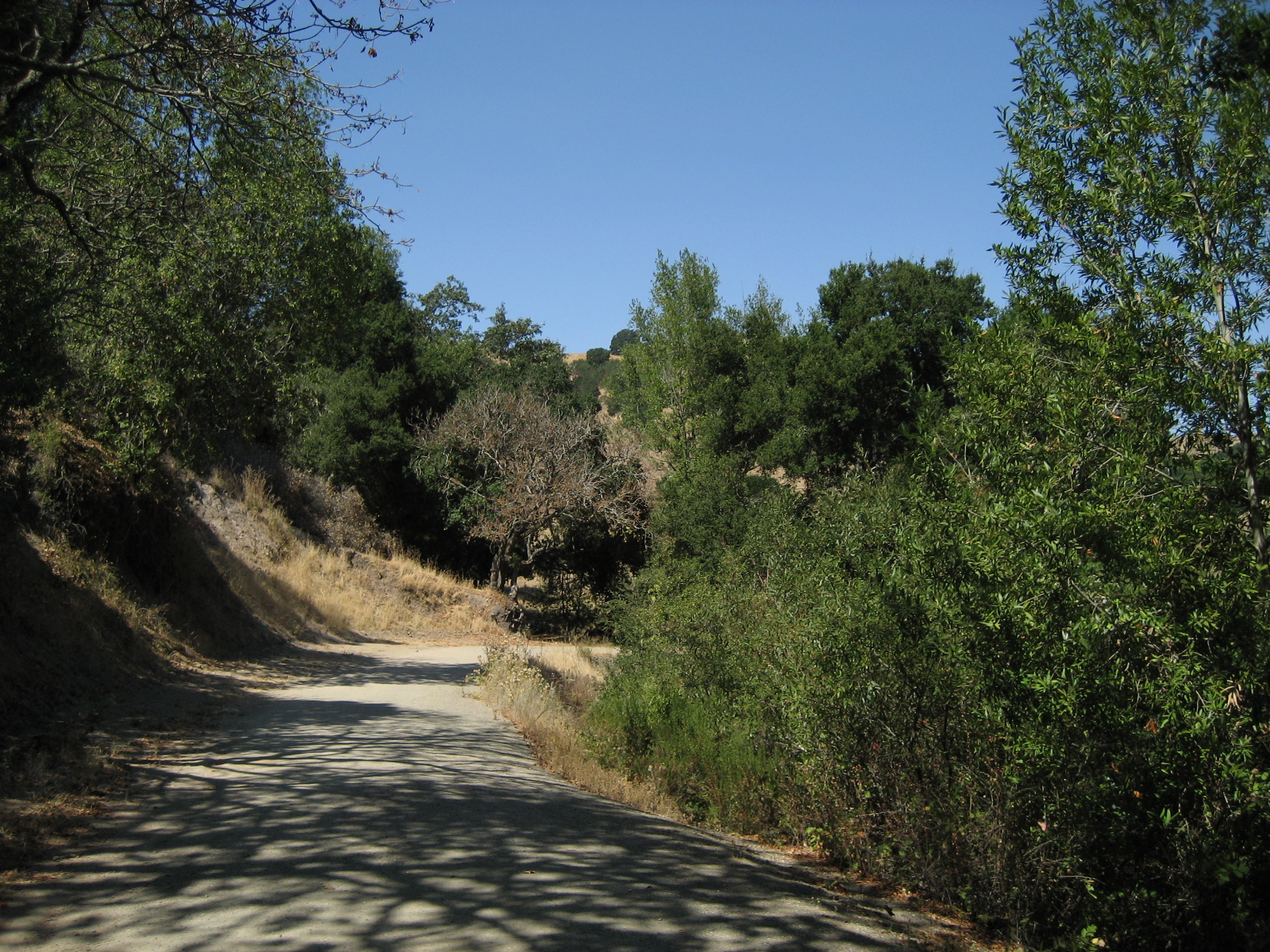
View from Old Briones Trail at Briones Regional Park.

The area which includes present day Briones Park and the Russell Reservation were part of the 1842 Mexican land grant of Rancho Boca de la Canada del Pinole granted to the widow of Felipe Briones. The Briones began cattle ranching in the area, which continues to the present day. In 1870, the Briones family sold the rancho.

By 1850, Happy Valley Road, which runs along the edge of Briones Regional Park, was the main thoroughfare from Martinez south to the Pueblo of San José, and then up to San Francisco.

In 1909, the Peoples' Water Company, the precursor to the East Bay Municipal Utility District purchased the land for watershed protection.

Since 1966 the University of California has maintained a 283-acre (1.15 km^{2}) parcel of land in the Briones Hills, known as the Russell Reservation, as a research center.

Briones Regional Park was established in October 1967 by the East Bay Regional Park District.

== See also ==
- Parks in Contra Costa County, California
