= Walnut Creek Open Space =

Collection of parks in Walnut Creek, CA

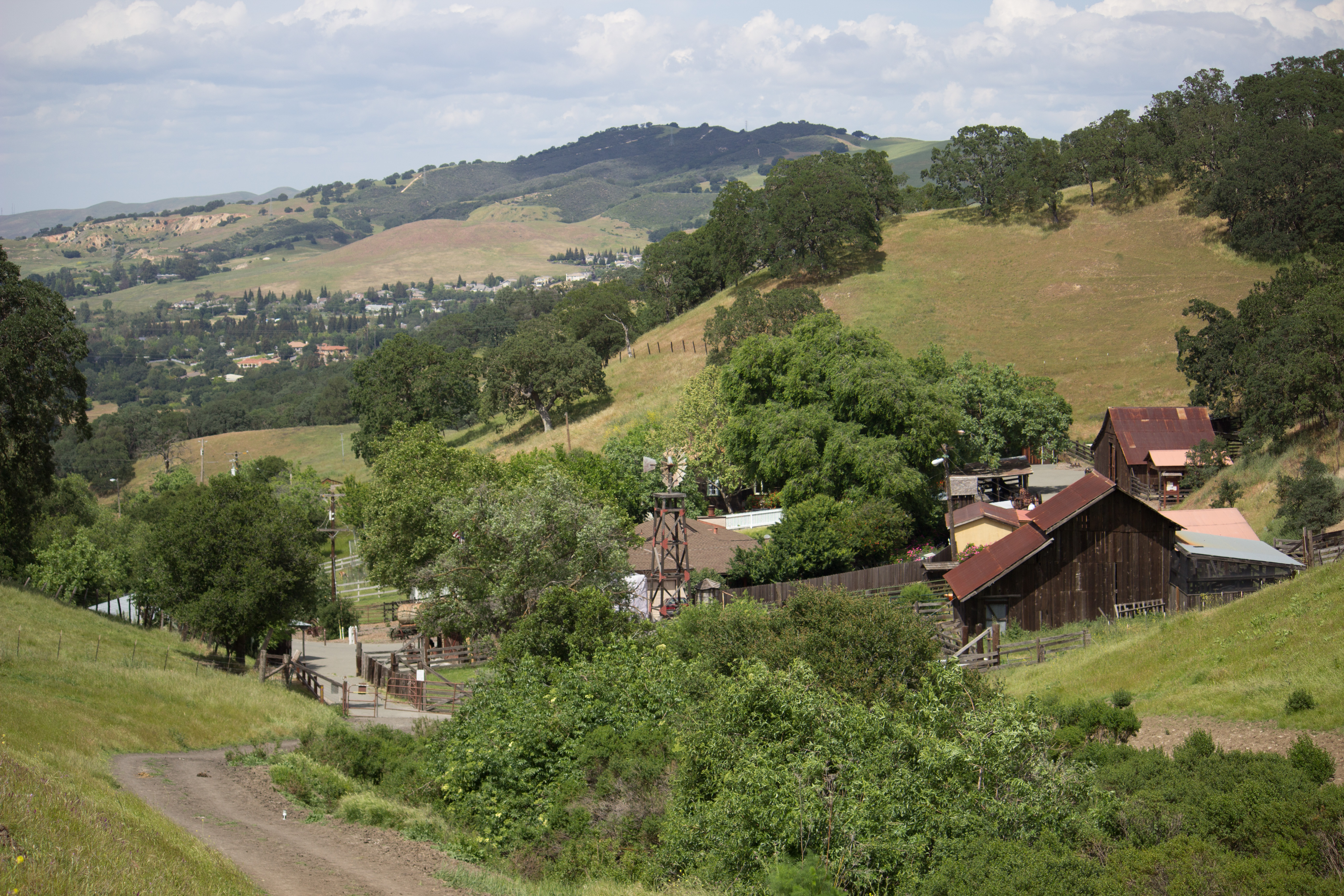
- View of Old Borges Ranch
- Location: Walnut Creek, California
- Website: https://www.walnut-creek.org/departments/open-space

Walnut Creek Open Space is a collection of parks and land owned by the city of Walnut Creek. It consists of four main areas: Shell Ridge, Lime Ridge, Acalanes Ridge, and Sugarloaf. Part of the natural area is old-growth forest and recognized by Old-Growth Forest Network.

== History ==
In the early 1970s, further Walnut Creek housing developments were proposed in the Mount Diablo foothills. Local activists worked with Walnut Creek City Council to get a bond measure for the city to purchase and preserve land put on the ballot of the June 1974 election, which voters approved.

== List of parks ==
These areas are part of Walnut Creek Open Space:

=== Shell Ridge ===
Shell Ridge is 1,420 acres and has 31 miles of trails. It is the largest parcel of Walnut Creek Open Space, and features the ridge, foothills, and rock outcroppings. It is connected to Mount Diablo State Park via the Briones-Mount Diablo Trail, and shares borders with the Diablo Foothills Regional Park and Castle Rock Regional Recreation Area.

Included in Shell Ridge are:

- Old Borges Ranch
- Howe Homestead Park

=== Lime Ridge ===
Lime Ridge is 1,226 acres and has 25 miles of trails. It is situated between Walnut Creek and Concord, adjacent to Mount Diablo State Park. Limestone was quarried at this site from 1905 to 1946. Botanist Mary Bowerman found Mount Diablo buckwheat at this location.

=== Acalanes Ridge ===
Acalanes Ridge is 201 acres and has 4 miles of trails. Its peak is the site of large concrete arrows once used by the Transcontinental Airway System.

=== Sugarloaf ===
Sugarloaf is 177 acres and has 3 miles of trails. It includes a ridge-top trail, black walnut grove, picnic area, bathrooms, ranger station.

== Walnut Creek Open Space Foundation ==
The Walnut Creek Open Space Foundation is a nonprofit organization tasked with restoring and maintaining the open space land. Projects have included planting native oak trees and native grasses, and restoring California quail habitat.
