= Contra Costa County, California =

County in California, United States

Coordinates: 37.93°N 121.95°W

Contra Costa County
- County
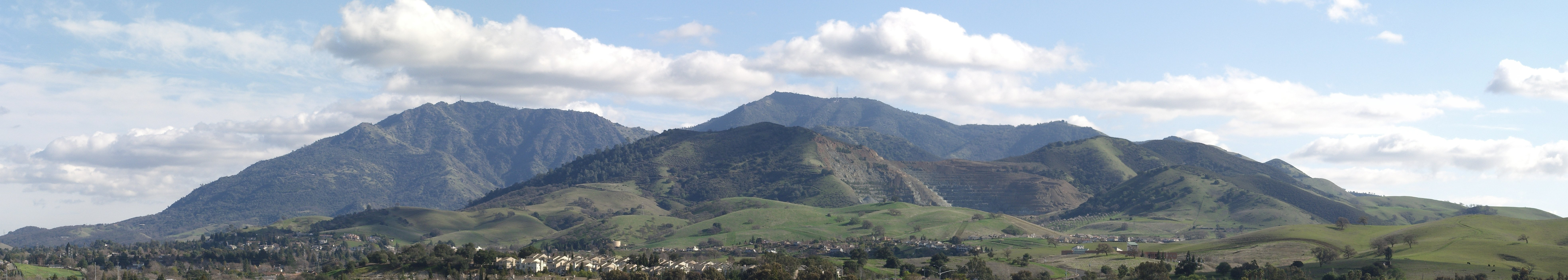
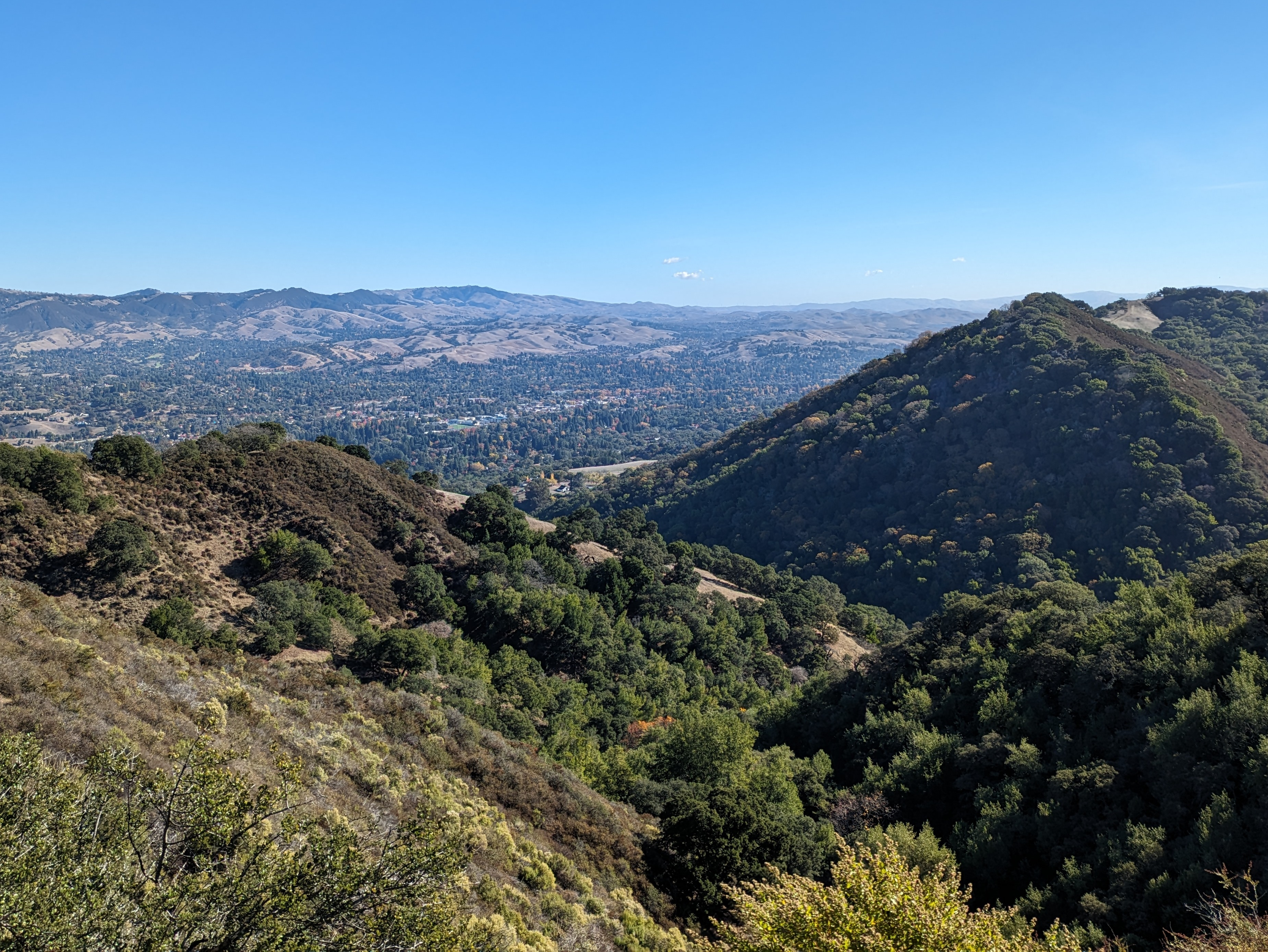
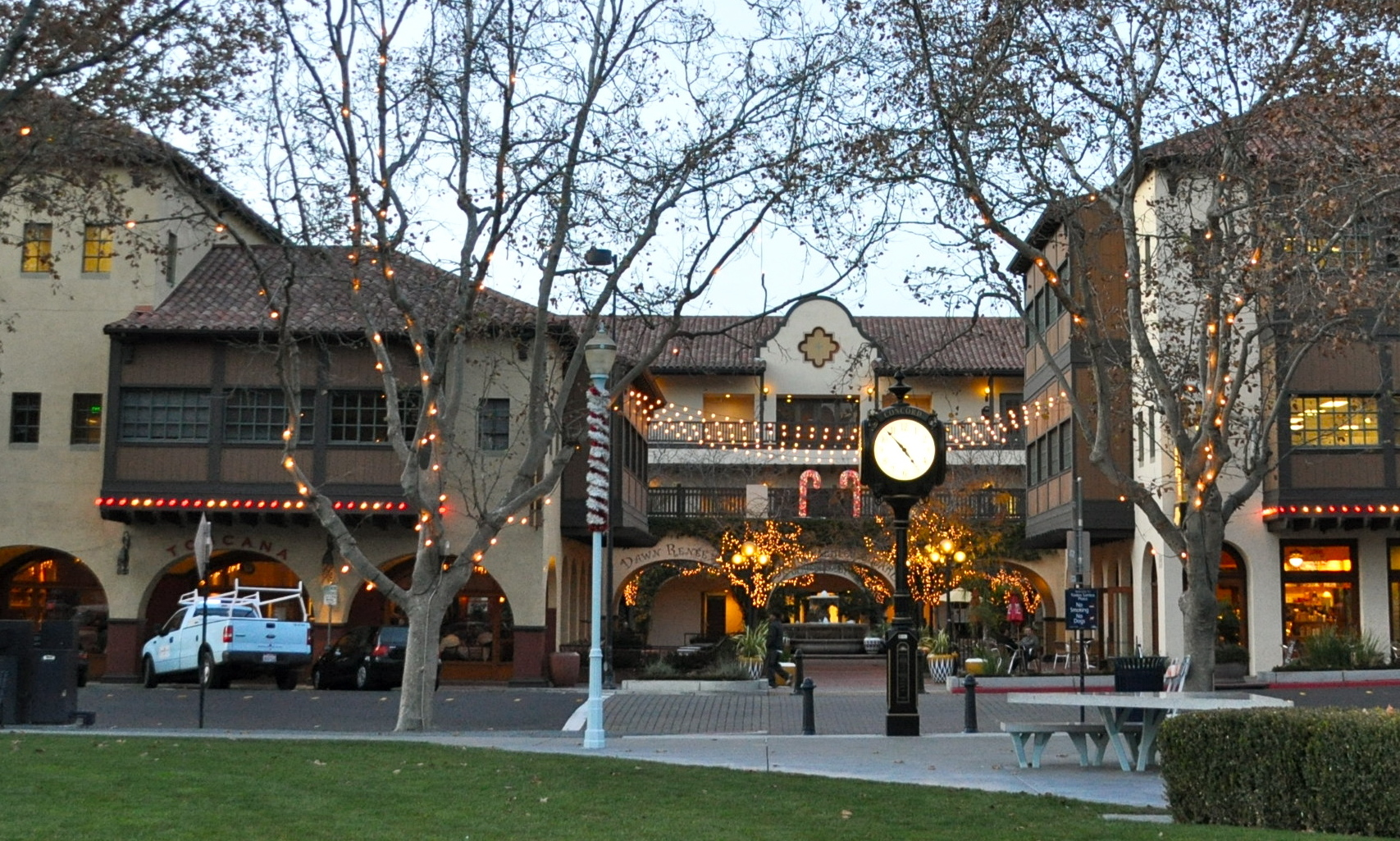
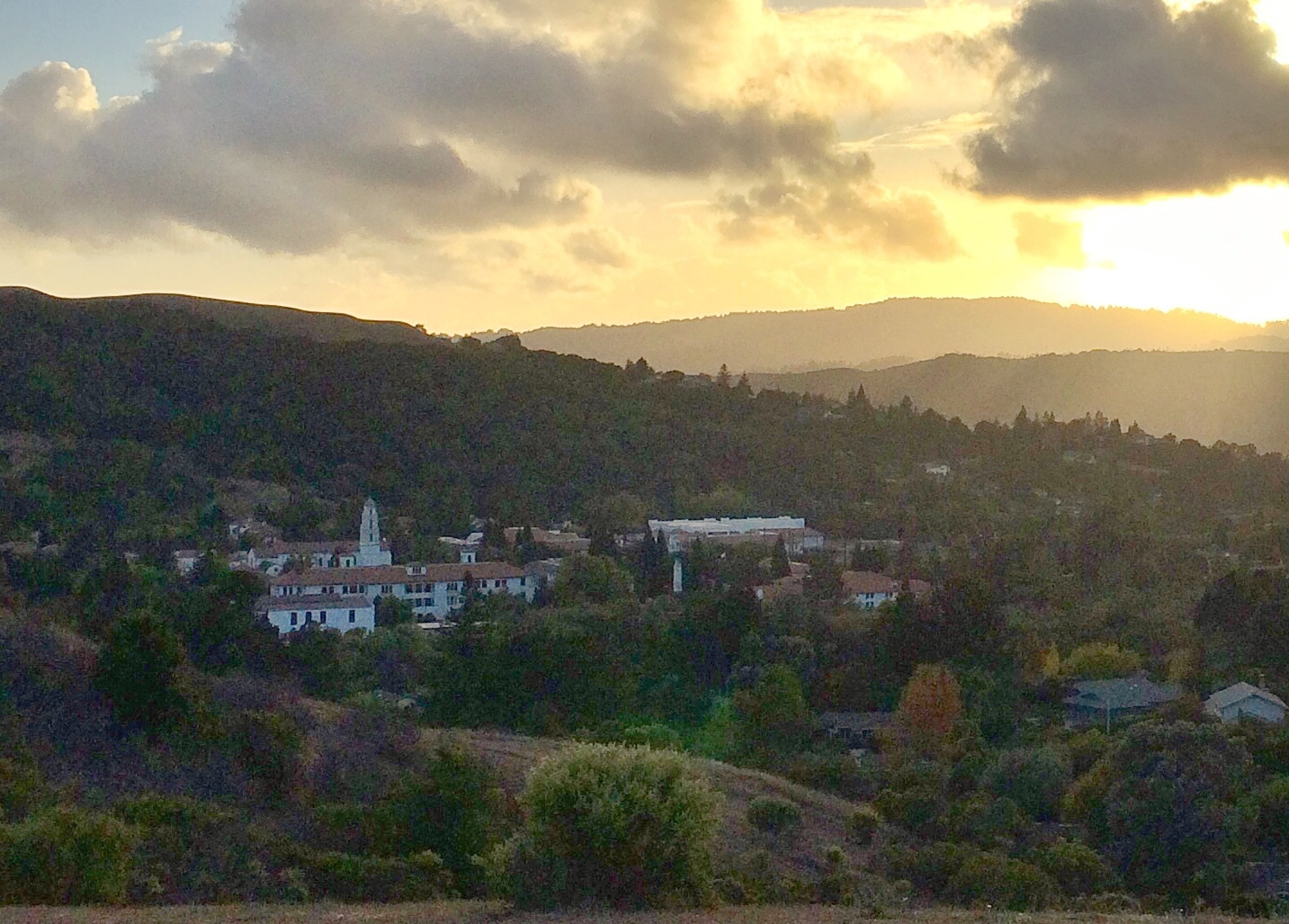
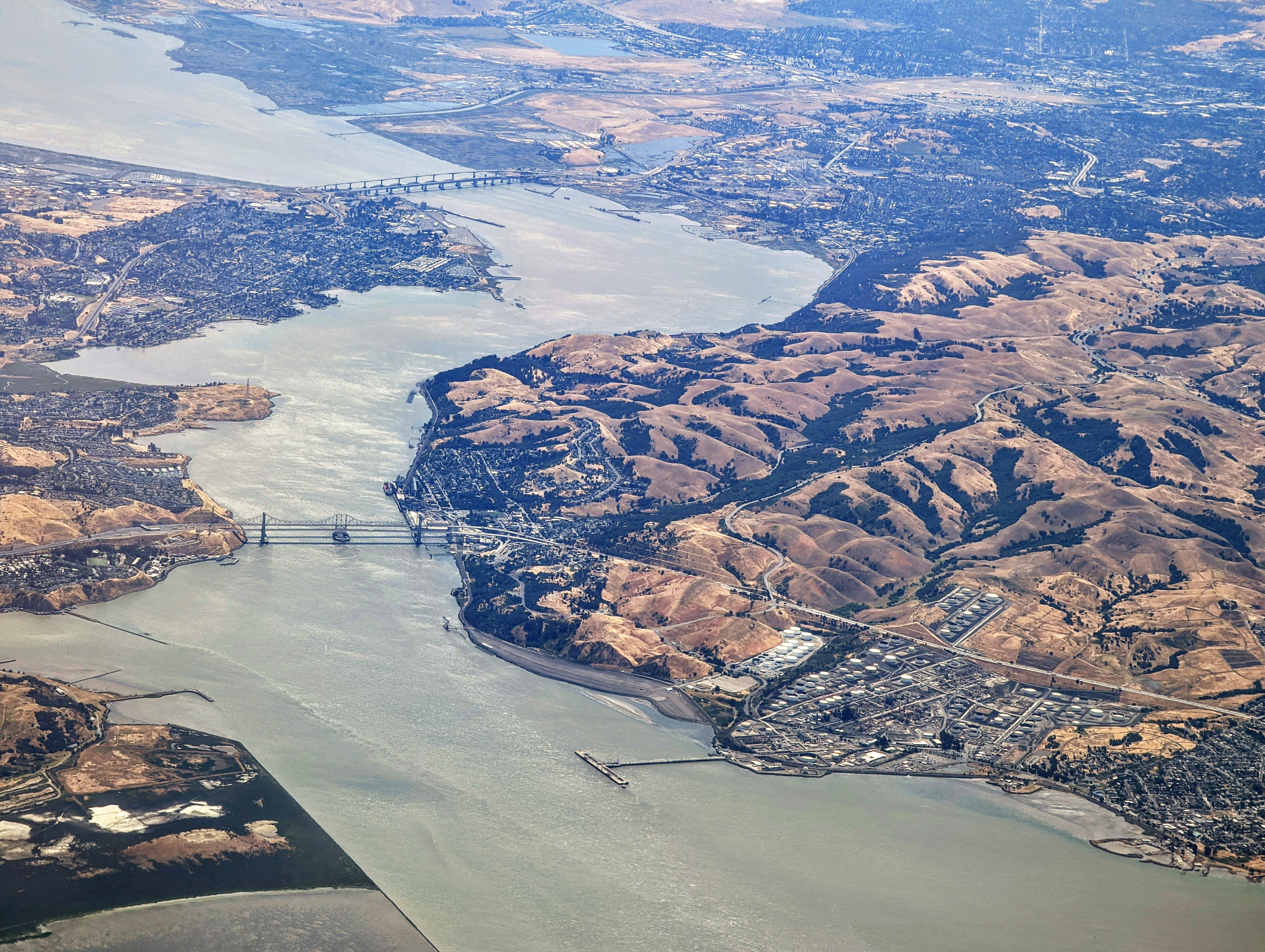
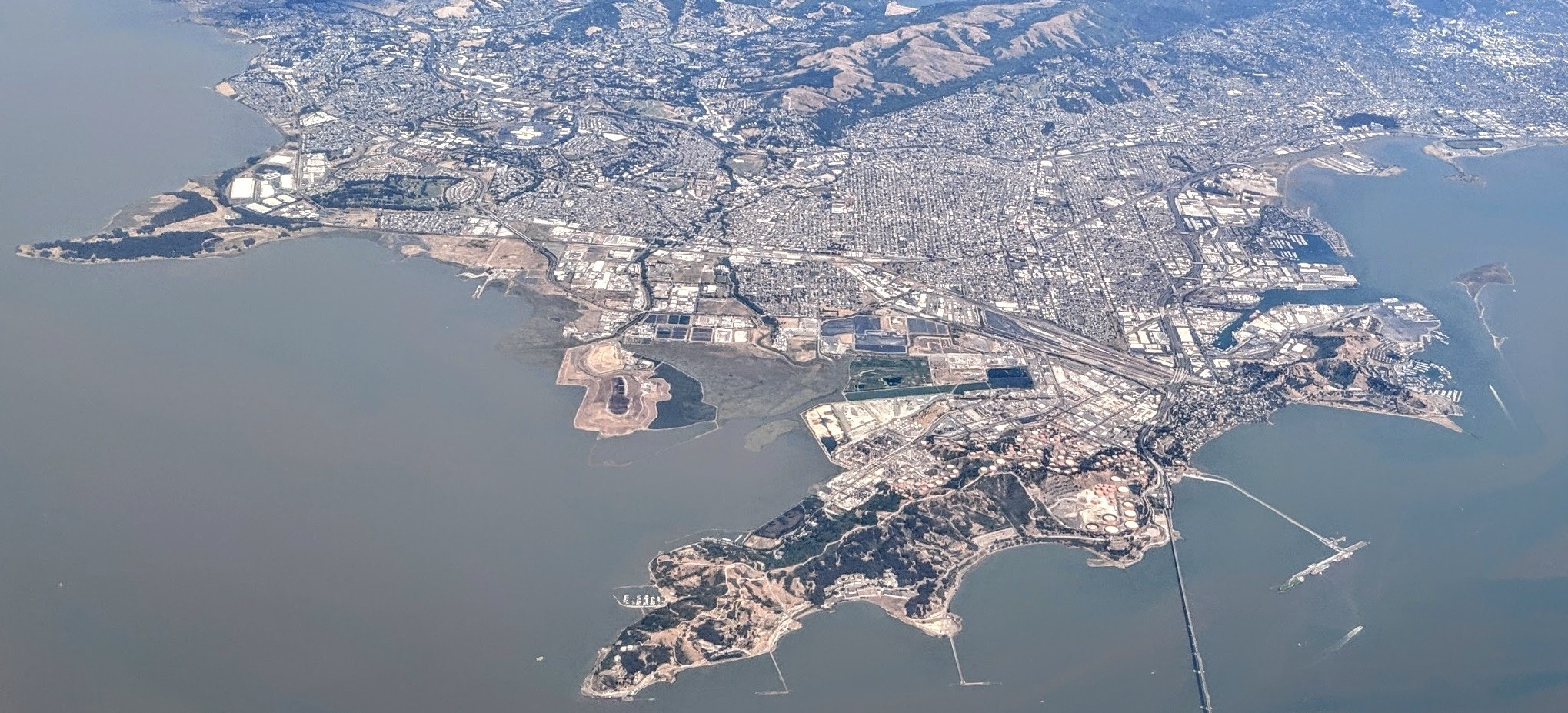
- Mount Diablo Las Trampas Regional Wilderness Concord Moraga Carquinez Strait Richmond and San Pablo

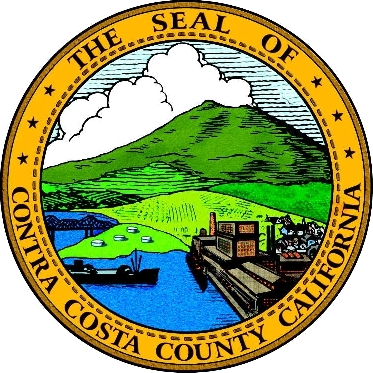
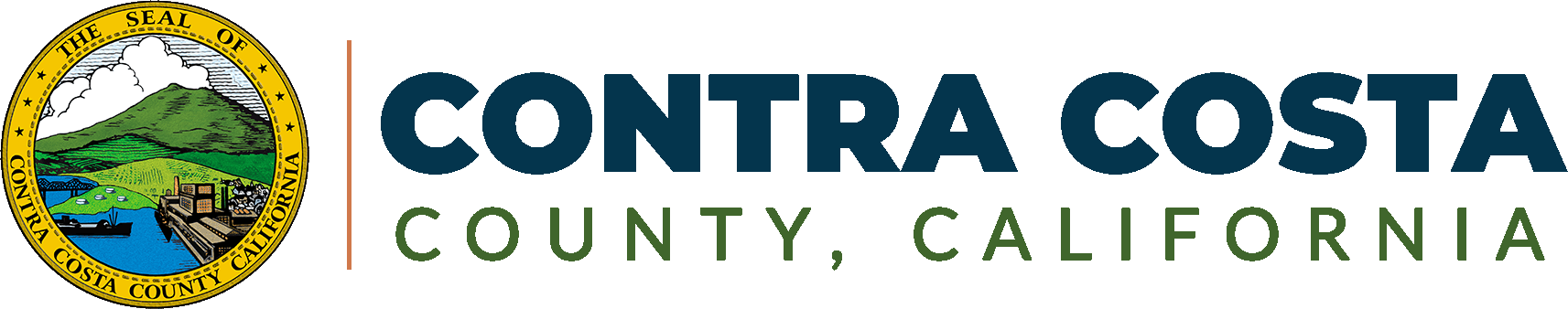
- Seal Coat of arms Wordmark

- Location in the state of California
- Interactive map of Contra Costa County
- Country: United States
- State: California
- Region: Bay Area
- Incorporated: February 18, 1850
- Named for: "Opposite coast" (Spanish: Contra costa) of the San Francisco Bay
- County seat: Martinez
- Largest city: Concord (population and land area); Richmond (total area)

Government
  - Type: Council–CAO
  - Body: Board of Supervisors
  - Chair: Diane Burgis
  - Vice Chair: Ken Carlson
  - Board of Supervisors: Supervisors: John Gioia; Candace Andersen; Diane Burgis; Ken Carlson; Shanelle Scales-Preston
  - County Administrator Office: Monica Nino

Area
  - Total: 804 sq mi (2,080 km^{2})
  - Land: 715.94 sq mi (1,854.3 km^{2})
  - Water: 81 sq mi (210 km^{2})
- Highest elevation: 3,852 ft (1,174 m)

Population (2020 United States census)
  - Total: 1,165,927
  - Estimate (2025): 1,170,070 ▲
  - Density: 1,628.5/sq mi (628.78/km^{2})

GDP
  - Total: $94.802 billion (2022)
- Time zone: UTC−8 (Pacific Time Zone)
  - Summer (DST): UTC−7 (Pacific Daylight Time)
- Area code: 510, 341, 925
- FIPS code: 06-013
- GNIS feature ID: 1675903
- Congressional districts: 8th, 9th, 10th
- Website: contracosta.ca.gov

Contra Costa County (/ˌkɒntrə ˈkɒstə/; Contra Costa, Spanish for 'Opposite Coast') is a northern county in the U.S. state of California, in the East Bay of the San Francisco Bay Area. As of the 2020 United States census, the population was 1,165,927. The county seat is Martinez.

It occupies the northern portion of the East Bay region of the San Francisco Bay Area and is primarily suburban. The county's name refers to its position on the other side of the bay from San Francisco. Contra Costa County is included in the San Francisco–Oakland–Fremont, CA metropolitan statistical area and the San Jose–San Francisco–Oakland, CA combined statistical area.

== History ==
=== Pre-human ===
In prehistoric times, particularly the Miocene epoch, portions of the landforms now in the area (then marshy and grassy savanna) were populated by a wide range of now extinct mammals, known in modern times by the fossil remains excavated in the southern part of the county. In the northern part of the county, significant coal and sand deposits were formed in even earlier geologic eras. Other areas of the county have ridges exposing ancient but intact (not fossilized) seashells, embedded in sandstone layers alternating with limestone. Layers of volcanic ash ejected from geologically recent but now extinct volcanoes, compacted and now tilted by compressive forces, may be seen at the site of some road excavations. This county is an agglomeration of several distinct geologic terranes, as is most of the greater San Francisco Bay Area, which is one of the most geologically complex regions in the world. The great local mountain Mount Diablo has been formed and continues to be elevated by compressive forces resulting from the action of plate tectonics and at its upper reaches presents ancient seabed rocks scraped from distant oceanic sedimentation locations and accumulated and lifted by these great forces. Younger deposits at middle altitudes include pillow lavas, the product of undersea volcanic eruptions.

=== Native American period ===
The Bay Miwok, Yokut and Ohlone people lived in the area now known as Contra Costa County before the arrival of Spanish colonists. The Volvon triblet of the Miwok lived on Tuyshtak (Mount Diablo near present-day Walnut Creek) until they were forcibly moved from their land into the Spanish missions in the early 1800s.

The Saklan tribe lived between Moraga, along San Leandro Creek, to Lafayette. Beginning in 1772, expeditions of Spanish missionaries and soldiers from Mission San José entered the San Ramon Valley. Early contact was fleeting and mostly peaceful, however, in the late 1700s, Spanish cattle were grazed the territory of the Saklan and their neighbors. The Saklans were one of the few groups who mounted resistance against the efforts of the Spanish to convert them to Christianity. Christian natives were sent to the Saklans to convince them to give up their culture and come to Mission San Jose; they were killed by the Saklans who wanted nothing to do with the Spanish way of life. A punitive expedition was sent to the area in 1797 to repress the Saklans, and a battle was fought in modern-day Lafayette. In the early 1800s, many Saklan fled to the mission as a result of societal collapse from disease. By the 1810s the Saklan's tribal range was essentially devoid of inhabitants.

=== Spanish colonial ===
Early interaction of these Native Americans with Europeans came with the Spanish colonization via the establishment of missions in this area, with the missions in San Jose, Sonoma, and San Francisco and particularly the establishment of a Presidio (a military establishment) in 1776. Although there were no missions established within this county, Spanish influence here was direct and extensive, through the establishment of land grants from the King of Spain to favored settlers.

=== Mexican land grants ===
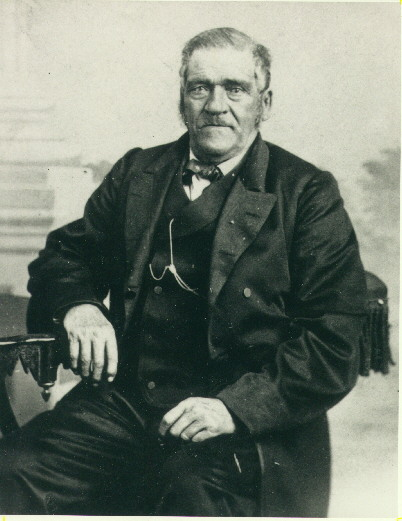
Don Salvio Pacheco

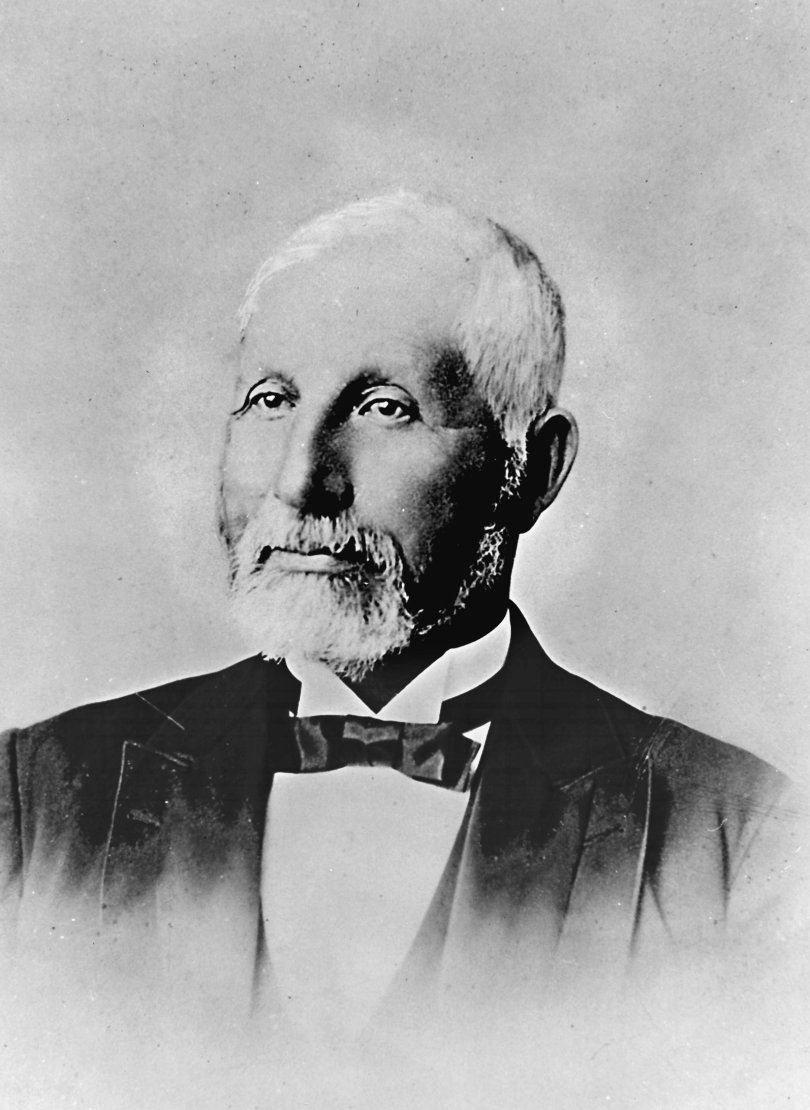
Don Víctor Castro

In 1821 Mexico gained independence from Spain. While little changed in ranchero life, the Mexican War of Independence resulted in the secularization of the missions with the re-distribution of their lands, and a new system of land grants under the Mexican Federal Law of 1824. Mission lands extended throughout the Bay Area, including portions of Contra Costa County. Between 1836 and 1846, during the era when California was a province of independent Mexico, the following 15 land grants were made in Contra Costa County.

- Acalanes
- Arroyo de Las Nueces y Bolbones
- Boca de la Cañada del Pinole
- Cañada del Hambre y Las Bolsas
- Cañada de los Vaqueros
- Laguna de los Palos Colorados
- Las Juntas
- Los Medanos
- Los Meganos
- Rancho Monte del Diablo was granted to Don Salvio Pacheco in 1834. He founded Concord. Nearby Pacheco is named after him.
- El Pinole
- San Pablo was granted to Don Víctor Castro in 1834 and Rancho El Sobrante in 1841.
- San Ramon (Amador)
- San Ramon (Pacheco-Castro)
- El Sobrante

The smallest unit was one square league, or about seven square miles, or 4,400 acres (17.8 square kilometers), maximum to one individual was eleven leagues, or 48,400 acres (195.9 km^{2}), including no more than 4,428 acres (17.9 km^{2}) of irrigable land. Rough surveying was based on a map, or diseño, measured by streams, shorelines, and/or horseman who marked it with rope and stakes. Lands outside rancho grants were designated el sobrante, as in surplus or excess, and considered common lands. The law required the construction of a house within a year. Fences were not required and were forbidden where they might interfere with roads or trails. Locally a large family required roughly 2000 head of cattle and two square leagues of land (fourteen square miles) to live comfortably. Foreign entrepreneurs came to the area to provide goods that Mexico could not, and trading ships were taxed. (Note: For a collection of observations of the Mexican provincial culture and trading practice (most notably in the acquisition of cattle hides for eastern U.S. shoe manufacturies) see portions of Two Years Before the Mast, a first-person narrative of a seaman's voyage to California starting in 1834.)

- Rancho Cañada de los Vaqueros was granted to Francisco Alviso, Antonio Higuera, and Manuel Miranda (26,660 acres (107.9 km^{2}) confirmed in 1889 to heirs of Robert Livermore).
- Two ranchos, both called Rancho San Ramon, were granted by the Mexican government in the San Ramon Valley. In 1833, Bartolomé Pacheco (southern San Ramon Valley) and Mariano Castro (northern San Ramon Valley) shared the two square league Rancho San Ramon. José María Amador was granted a four square league Rancho San Ramon in 1834.
- In 1834 Rancho Monte del Diablo (present day Concord, California) was confirmed with 17,921 acres (72.5 km^{2}) to Salvio Pacheco (born July 15, 1793, died 1876). The Pacheco family settled at the Rancho in 1846 (between the Pacheco shipping port townsite and Clayton area, and including much of Lime Ridge). The boundary lines were designated with stone markers. Clayton was later located on El Sobrante's lands just east of Rancho Monte del Diablo (Mount Diablo).
- In 1834, Rancho Arroyo de Las Nueces y Bolbones, aka Rancho San Miguel (present day Walnut Creek), was granted to Juana Sanchez de Pacheco, in recognition of the service of Corporal Miguel Pacheco 37 years earlier (confirmed 1853, patented to heirs 1866); the grant was for two leagues, but drawn free hand on the diseño/map, and reading "two leagues, more or less" as indicated in the diseño, but actually including and confirmed for nearly four leagues or nearly 18,000 acres (72.8 km^{2}), but only 10,000 acres (40.5 km^{2}) were ever shown as having once belonged to Juana Sanchez.
- 'Meganos' means 'sand dunes.' A "paraje que llaman los Méganos" 'place called the sand dunes' (with a variant spelling) is mentioned in Durán's diary on May 24, 1817. Two Los Meganos Ranchos were granted, later differentiated as Rancho Los Meganos (1835, three leagues or at least 13,285 acres (53.8 km^{2})) in what is now the Brentwood area, to Jose Noriega then acquired by John Marsh; and Rancho Los Medanos (to Jose Antonio Mesa and Jose Miguel Garcia, Pittsburg area, dated November 26, 1839).

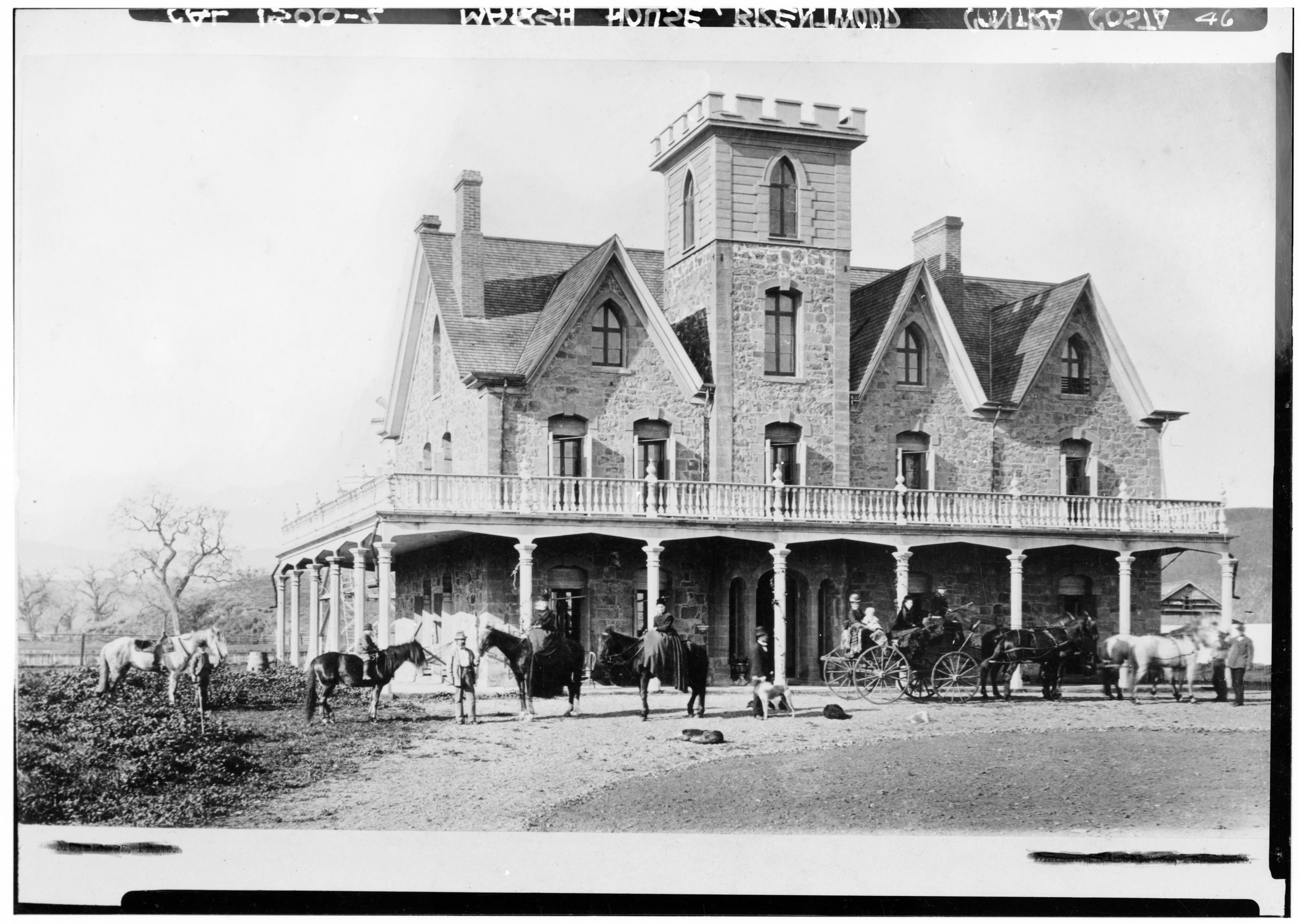
Much of Rancho Los Meganos is now part of Marsh Creek State Park. The John Marsh Stone House still stands, but is in need of restoration.

=== Bear Flag Republic and statehood ===
The exclusive land ownership in California by Hispanics in California would soon end. John Marsh, owner of Rancho Los Meganos in Contra Costa County, sent letters to influential people in the eastern United States extolling the climate, soil, and potential for agriculture in California, with the purpose of encouraging Americans to immigrate to California and lead to its becoming part of the United States. His letters were published in newspapers throughout the East which started the first wagon trains to California. He invited the settlers to stay on his ranch, and Rancho Los Meganos became the terminus of the California trail.

This led to the Bear Flag Revolt in 1846 when about 30 settlers originally from the United States declared a republic in June 1846 and were enlisted and fighting under the U.S. flag by July 1846. Following the Mexican–American War of 1846–48, California was controlled by U.S. settlers organized under the California Battalion and the U.S. Navy's Pacific Squadron. After some minor skirmishes, California was under U.S. control by January 1847 and formally annexed and paid for by the U.S. in 1848. By 1850, California's population of over 100,000 was rapidly growing due to the gold rush and the large amount of gold being exported east, which gave California enough clout to choose its own boundaries, write its own constitution, and be admitted to the Union as a free state in 1850 without going through territorial status as required for most other states.

In 1850 California had a non-Indian population of over 100,000. The number of Indians living in California in 1850 has been estimated to be from 60,000 to 100,000. By 1850 the Mission Indian populations had largely succumbed to disease and abuse and only numbered a few thousand. California's 1852 state Census gives 31,266 Indian residents, but this is an under-count since there was little incentive and much difficulty in getting it more correct.

=== County creation ===
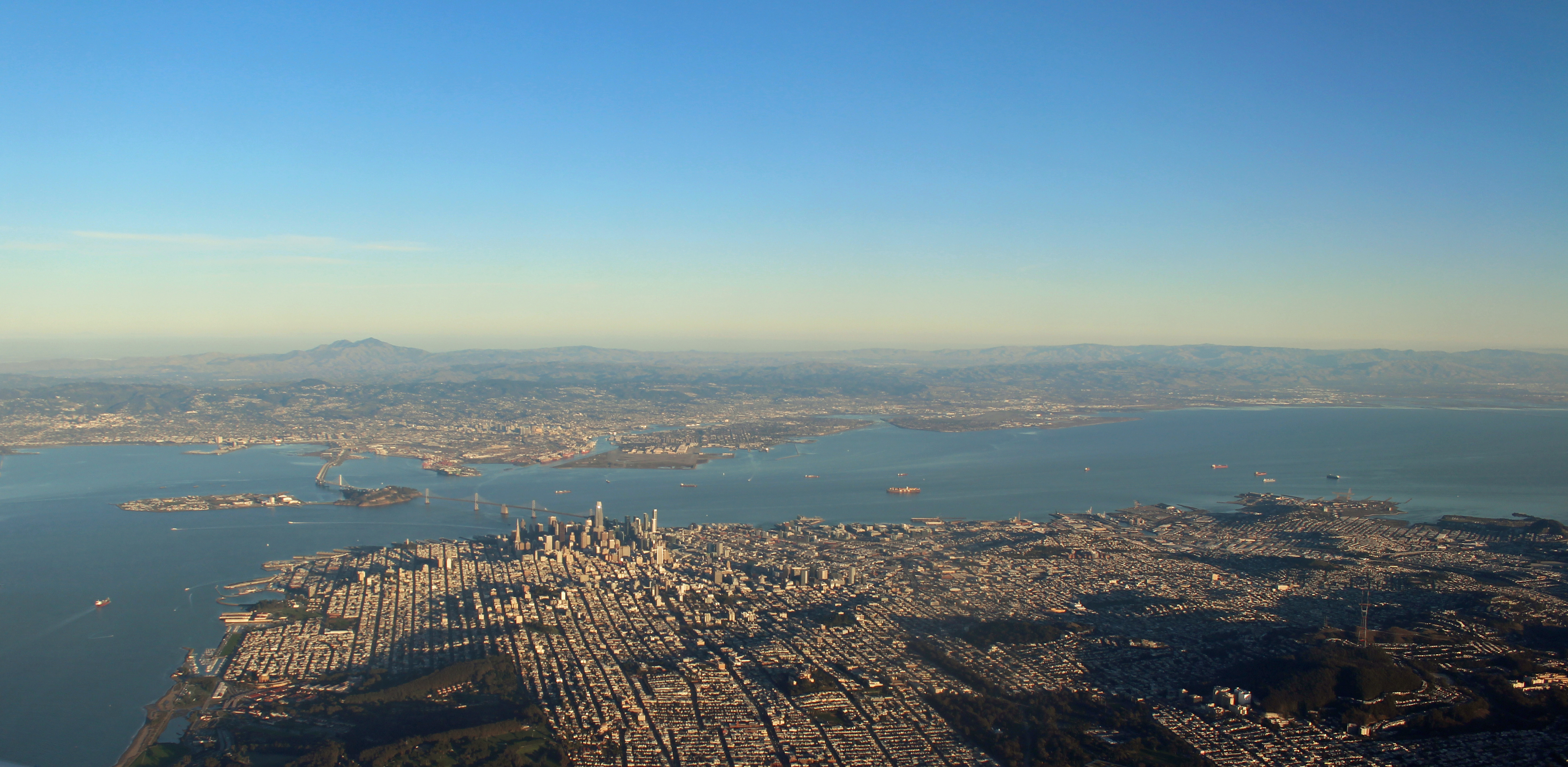
Alameda and Contra Costa counties on the eastern shore of San Francisco Bay, opposite San Francisco in the foreground.

Contra Costa County was one of the original 27 counties of California, created in 1850 at the time of statehood. The county was originally to be called Mt. Diablo County, but the name was changed prior to incorporation as a county. The county's Spanish language name means opposite coast, because of its location opposite San Francisco, in an easterly direction, on San Francisco Bay. Southern portions of the county's territory, including all of the bayside portions opposite San Francisco and northern portions of Santa Clara County, were given up to form Alameda County effective March 25, 1853.

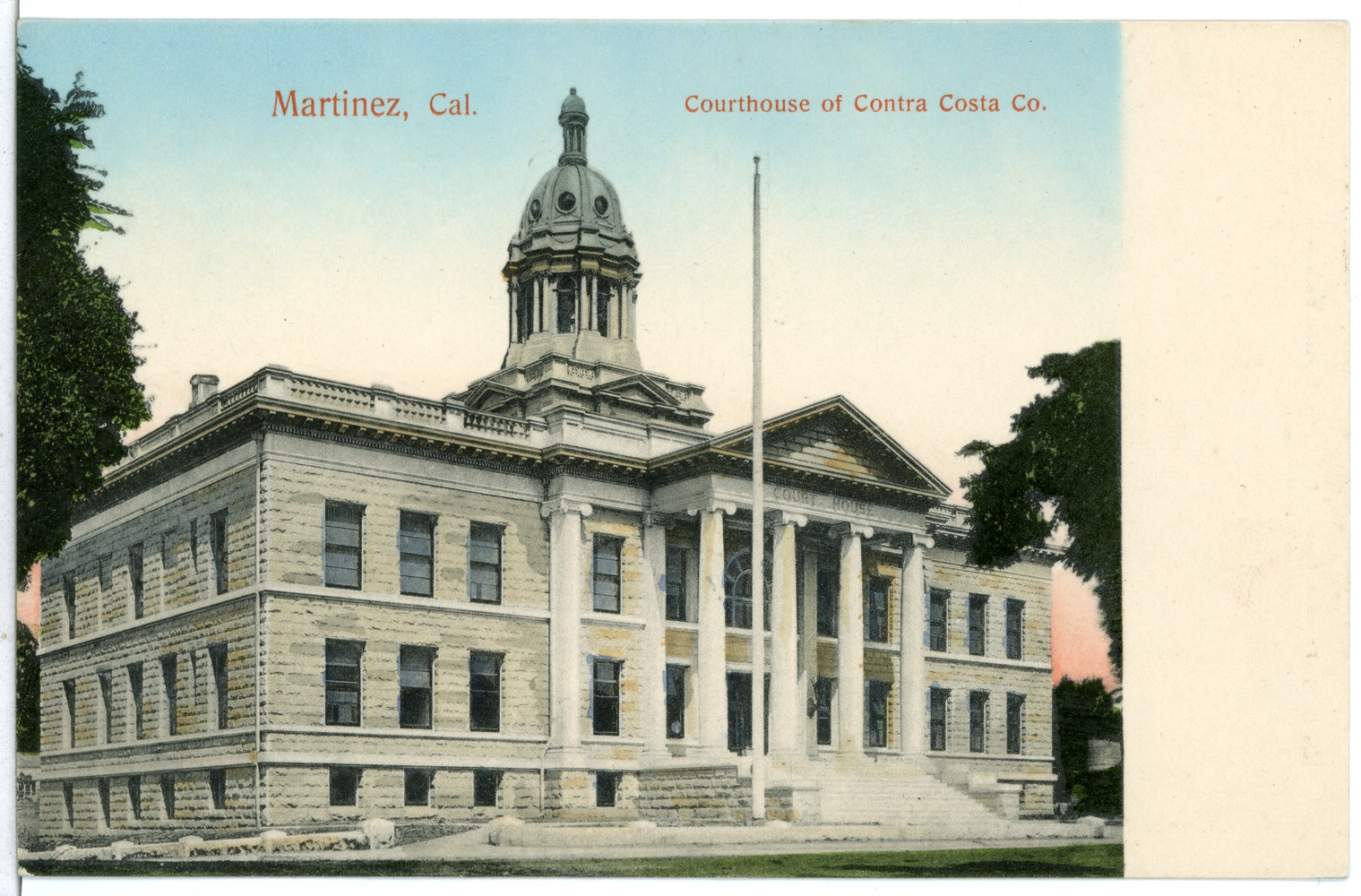
Postcard showing the Contra Costa County Courthouse in 1906.

The land titles in Contra Costa County may be traced to multiple subdivisions of a few original land grants. The grantee's family names live on in a few city and town names such as Martinez, Pacheco and Moraga and in the names of streets, residential subdivisions, and business parks. A few mansions from the more prosperous farms have been preserved as museums and cultural centers and one of the more rustic examples has been preserved as a working demonstration ranch, Borges Ranch.

In the 1860 United States Census, Contra Costa County had a population of 4,381.

=== 1941–1945 ===
During World War II, Richmond hosted one of the two Bay Area sites of Kaiser Shipyards and wartime pilots were trained at what is now Concord/Buchanan Field Airport. Additionally, a large Naval Weapons Depot and munitions ship loading facilities at Port Chicago remain active to this day, but with the inland storage facilities recently declared surplus, extensive redevelopment is being planned for this last large central-county tract. The loading docks were the site of a devastating explosion in 1944. Port Chicago was bought out and demolished by the Federal Government to form a safety zone near the Naval Weapons Station loading docks. At one time the Atlas Powder Company (subsequently closed) produced gunpowder and dynamite. The site of the former Atlas Powder Company is located at Point Pinole Regional Shoreline, part of the East Bay Regional Parks District.

=== 1945-present day ===
With the postwar baby boom and the desire for suburban living, large tract housing developers would purchase large central county farmsteads and develop them with roads, utilities and housing. Once mostly rural walnut orchards and cattle ranches, the area was first developed as low-cost, large-lot suburbs, with a typical low-cost home being placed on a "quarter-acre" (1,000 m^{2}) lot — actually a little less at 10,000 square feet (930 square metres). Some of the expansion of these suburban areas was clearly attributable to white flight from decaying areas of Alameda County and the consolidated city-county of San Francisco, but much was due to the postwar baby boom of the era creating demand for three- and four-bedroom houses with large yards that were unaffordable or unavailable in the established bayside cities.

A number of large companies followed their employees to the suburbs, filling large business parks. The establishment of a large, prosperous population in turn fostered the development of large shopping centers and created demand for an extensive supporting infrastructure including roads, schools, libraries, police, firefighting, water, sewage, and flood control.

The establishment of the Bay Area Rapid Transit (BART) system, the modernization of Highway 24, and the addition of a fourth Caldecott Tunnel bore all served to reinforce the demographic and economic trends in the Diablo Valley area, with cities such as Walnut Creek and Concord becoming edge cities.

The central county cities have in turn spawned their own suburbs within the county, extending east along the county's estuarine north shore; with the older development areas of Bay Point and Pittsburg being augmented by extensive development in Antioch, Oakley, and Brentwood.

The effects of the housing value crash (2008–2011) varied widely throughout the county. Values of houses in prosperous areas with good schools declined only modestly in value, while houses recently built in outlying suburbs in the eastern part of the county experienced severe reductions in value, accelerated by high unemployment and consequent mortgage foreclosures, owner strategic walk-aways, and the too-rapid conversion of neighborhoods from owner-occupancy to rentals. Home values rebounded as the economy recovered from the recession.

== Geography ==
According to the U.S. Census Bureau, the county has a total area of 804 square miles (2,080 km^{2}), of which 716 square miles (1,850 km^{2}) is land and 88 square miles (230 km^{2}) (11%) is water.

Contra Costa County's physical geography is dominated by the bayside alluvial plain, the Oakland Hills–Berkeley Hills, several inland valleys, and Mount Diablo, an isolated 3,849-foot (1,173 m) upthrust peak at the north end of the Diablo Range of hills. The summit of Mount Diablo is the origin of the Mount Diablo Meridian and Base Line, on which the surveys of much of California and western Nevada are based.

The Hayward Fault Zone runs through the western portion of the county, from Kensington to Richmond. The Calaveras Fault runs in the south-central portion of the county, from Alamo to San Ramon. The Concord Fault runs through part of Concord and Pacheco, and the Clayton-Marsh Creek-Greenville Fault runs from Clayton at its north end to near Livermore. These strike-slip faults and the Diablo thrust fault near Danville are all considered capable of significantly destructive earthquakes and many lesser related faults are present in the area that cross critical infrastructure such as water, natural gas, and petroleum product pipelines, roads, highways, railroads, and BART rail transit.

=== Sub-areas ===
Contra Costa County is broadly divided into three sub-areas:

- West County, including of the cities of El Cerrito, Richmond, San Pablo, Pinole, and Hercules, as well as the unincorporated communities of Kensington, El Sobrante, North Richmond, Rodeo, Crockett, and Port Costa.
- Central County, which is itself further divided into three areas:
  - Lamorinda, including of the cities of Lafayette, Moraga, and Orinda (the name being a portmanteau of the three cities' names), as well as the unincorporated area of Canyon.
  - North Central County, including of the cities of Walnut Creek, Pleasant Hill, Concord, Clayton, and Martinez, as well as the unincorporated areas of Pacheco, Vine Hill, Clyde, the Pleasant Hill BART station, and Saranap.
  - San Ramon Valley, including the cities of Danville and San Ramon, and the unincorporated communities of Alamo, Blackhawk, and Tassajara.
- East County, on the western edge of the Central Valley, including of the cities of Pittsburg, Antioch, Oakley, and Brentwood, as well as the unincorporated communities of Bay Point, Bethel Island, Knightsen, Discovery Bay, and Byron.

=== Adjacent counties ===
- Solano County - north
- Sacramento County - northeast
- San Joaquin County - east
- Alameda County - south

=== National protected areas ===
- Antioch Dunes National Wildlife Refuge
- Eugene O'Neill National Historic Site
- John Muir National Historic Site
- Port Chicago Naval Magazine National Memorial
- Rosie the Riveter/World War II Home Front National Historical Park

=== Mount Diablo ===
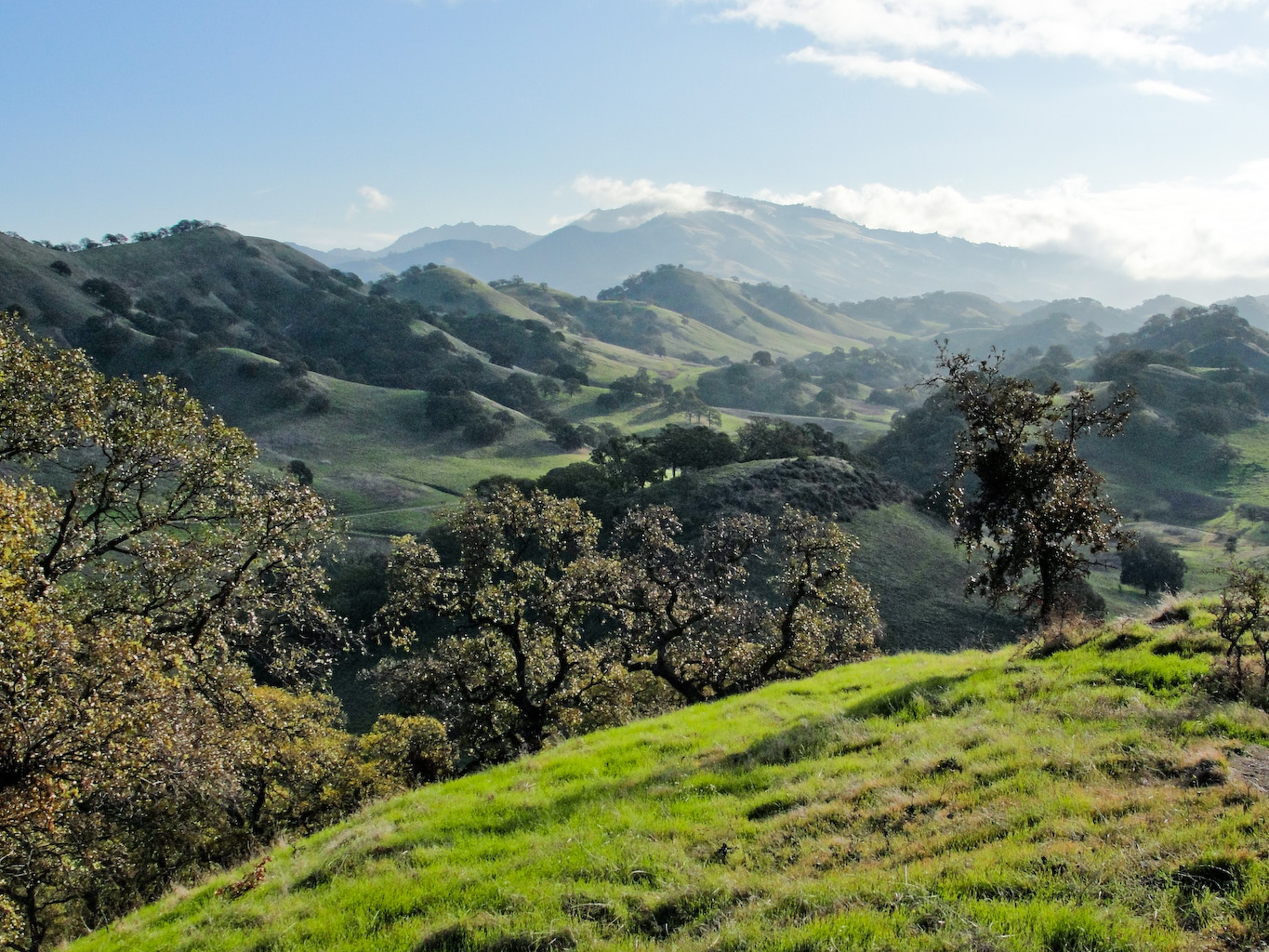
Mount Diablo from Shell Ridge Open Space

The most notable natural landmark in the county is the 3,849-foot (1,173 m) Mount Diablo, at the northerly end of the Diablo Range. Mount Diablo and its neighboring North Peak are the centerpiece of Mt. Diablo State Park (MDSP), created legislatively in 1921 and rededicated in 1931 after land acquisitions had been completed. At the time this park comprised a very small portion of the mountain.

In the 1960s, suburban development expanding from the surrounding valleys began to threaten the open space of the mountain. In 1971, MDSP consisted of 6,788 acres (27.5 km^{2}). That year, concerned residents formed the non-profit organization Save Mount Diablo to raise funds and awareness to protect more open space. In addition to encouraging acquisition by the state and local authorities, SMD started fundraising and acquiring properties to transfer to the park. MDSP was the first of twenty-nine Diablo-area parks and preserves that have been created around the peaks; today these preserves protect more than 89,000 acres (360 km^{2}).

These Diablo public lands stretch southeast and include the Concord Naval Weapons Station, Shell Ridge Open Space and Lime Ridge Open Spaces near Walnut Creek, to the State Park, and east to the Los Vaqueros Reservoir watershed and four surrounding East Bay Regional Park District preserves, including Morgan Territory Regional Preserve, Brushy Peak Regional Preserve, Vasco Caves Regional Preserve, and Round Valley Regional Preserve. The new Marsh Creek State Park, formerly known as Cowell Ranch State Park, and Black Diamond Mines Regional Preserve, are among the open spaces that stretch to the north. The open spaces controlled by cities, the East Bay Regional Park District, Mount Diablo State Park, and various regional preserves now adjoin and protect most of the elevated regions of the mountain.

The name Mount Diablo is said to originate from an incident involving Spanish soldiers who christened a thicket as Monte del Diablo when natives they were pursuing apparently disappeared into the thicket. Anglo settlers later misunderstood the use of the word 'monte' (which can mean 'mountain', or 'thicket'), and applied the name to the most obvious local landmark.

According to the Contra Costa Times, in 2011, there were rumors that Contra Costa County was going to rename the mountain as "Mt. Ronald Reagan" or "Mt. Reagan", after the former US president and California governor. Residents have generated multiple petitions to change the name of the mountain, one in 2005 and another in 2011, but these were not successful.

== Demographics ==
Historical population
| Census | Pop. | Note | %± |
|---|---|---|---|
| 1860 | 5,328 | | — |
| 1870 | 8,461 | | 58.8% |
| 1880 | 12,525 | | 48.0% |
| 1890 | 13,515 | | 7.9% |
| 1900 | 18,046 | | 33.5% |
| 1910 | 31,674 | | 75.5% |
| 1920 | 53,889 | | 70.1% |
| 1930 | 78,608 | | 45.9% |
| 1940 | 100,450 | | 27.8% |
| 1950 | 298,984 | | 197.6% |
| 1960 | 409,030 | | 36.8% |
| 1970 | 558,389 | | 36.5% |
| 1980 | 656,380 | | 17.5% |
| 1990 | 803,732 | | 22.4% |
| 2000 | 948,816 | | 18.1% |
| 2010 | 1,049,025 | | 10.6% |
| 2020 | 1,165,927 | | 11.1% |
| 2025 (est.) | 1,172,015 | ▲ | 0.5% |
U.S. Decennial Census; 1790–1960 1900–1990; 1990–2000 2010 2020

=== 2020 census ===
As of the 2020 census, Contra Costa County had a population of 1,165,927, and the median age was 40.1 years. 22.6% of residents were under the age of 18 and 16.5% were 65 years of age or older. For every 100 females there were 95.0 males, and for every 100 females age 18 and over there were 92.4 males age 18 and over.

The racial makeup of the county was 43.0% White, 8.7% Black or African American, 1.0% American Indian and Alaska Native, 18.7% Asian, 0.5% Native Hawaiian and Pacific Islander, 14.9% from some other race, and 13.2% from two or more races. Hispanic or Latino residents of any race comprised 27.0% of the population.

99.0% of residents lived in urban areas, while 1.0% lived in rural areas.

There were 407,029 households in the county, of which 35.4% had children under the age of 18 living with them and 25.4% had a female householder with no spouse or partner present. About 21.5% of all households were made up of individuals and 10.4% had someone living alone who was 65 years of age or older.

There were 423,342 housing units, of which 3.9% were vacant. Among occupied housing units, 65.6% were owner-occupied and 34.4% were renter-occupied. The homeowner vacancy rate was 0.7% and the rental vacancy rate was 4.3%.

=== Racial and ethnic composition ===
Contra Costa County, California – Racial and ethnic composition Note: the US Census treats Hispanic/Latino as an ethnic category. This table excludes Latinos from the racial categories and assigns them to a separate category. Hispanics/Latinos may be of any race.
| Race / Ethnicity (NH = Non-Hispanic) | Pop 1980 | Pop 1990 | Pop 2000 | Pop 2010 | Pop 2020 | % 1980 | % 1990 | % 2000 | % 2010 | % 2020 |
|---|---|---|---|---|---|---|---|---|---|---|
| White alone (NH) | 503,978 | 560,146 | 549,409 | 500,923 | 455,421 | 76.78% | 69.69% | 57.90% | 47.75% | 39.06% |
| Black or African American alone (NH) | 59,498 | 72,799 | 86,851 | 93,604 | 97,994 | 9.06% | 9.06% | 9.15% | 8.92% | 8.40% |
| Native American or Alaska Native alone (NH) | 3,890 | 4,441 | 3,648 | 2,984 | 2,553 | 0.59% | 0.55% | 0.38% | 0.28% | 0.22% |
| Asian alone (NH) | 30,563 | 73,810 | 102,681 | 148,881 | 214,520 | 4.66% | 9.18% | 10.82% | 14.19% | 18.40% |
| Native Hawaiian or Pacific Islander alone (NH) | x | x | 3,157 | 4,382 | 5,720 | x | x | 0.33% | 0.42% | 0.49% |
| Other race alone (NH) | 2,631 | 1,254 | 2,636 | 3,122 | 8,366 | 0.40% | 0.16% | 0.28% | 0.30% | 0.72% |
| Mixed race or Multiracial (NH) | x | x | 32,658 | 39,569 | 66,453 | x | x | 3.44% | 3.77% | 5.70% |
| Hispanic or Latino (any race) | 55,820 | 91,282 | 167,776 | 255,560 | 314,900 | 8.50% | 11.36% | 17.68% | 24.36% | 27.01% |
| Total | 656,380 | 803,732 | 948,816 | 1,049,025 | 1,165,927 | 100.00% | 100.00% | 100.00% | 100.00% | 100.00% |

=== American Community Survey 2025 data ===
The United States Census Bureau estimated that in 2025, Contra Costa County’s population was 1.170.070. It was also estimated that the county's population was 35,90% Non-Hispanic White, 28,68% Hispanic or Latino, 8,16% Non-Hispanic Black, 21,28% Asian, 0,23% Native American, 0,52% Pacific Islander, and 5,24% Multiracial.

| Total | Population | Percentage |
|---|---|---|
| Non-Hispanic White | 420.079 | 35,90% |
| Hispanic or Latino | 335.538 | 28,68% |
| Non-Hispanic Black | 95.429 | 8,16% |
| Asian | 248.988 | 21,28% |
| Native American | 2.662 | 0,23% |
| Pacific Islander | 6.055 | 0,52% |
| Non-Hispanic Multiracial | 61.319 | 5,24% |

=== 2010 Census ===
The 2010 United States census reported that Contra Costa County had a population of 1,049,025. The racial makeup of Contra Costa County was 614,512 (58.6%) White; 97,161 (9.3%) African American; 6,122 (0.6%) Native American; 151,469 (14.4%) Asian (4.6% Filipino, 3.8% Chinese, 2.1% Indian); 4,845 (0.5%) Pacific Islander; 112,691 (10.7%) from other races; and 62,225 (5.9%) from two or more races. There were 255,560 people (24.4%) of Hispanic or Latino ancestry, of any race; 17.1% of Contra Costa County's population was of Mexican ancestry, while 1.9% was of Salvadoran heritage.

| Demographic profile | 2010 |
|---|---|
| Total Population | 1,049,025 - 100.0% |
| One Race | 986,800 - 94.1% |
| Not Hispanic or Latino | 793,465 - 75.6% |
| White alone | 500,923 - 47.8% |
| Black or African American alone | 93,604 - 8.9% |
| American Indian and Alaska Native alone | 2,984 - 0.3% |
| Asian alone | 148,881 - 14.2% |
| Native Hawaiian and Other Pacific Islander alone | 4,382 - 0.4% |
| Some other race alone | 3,122 - 0.3% |
| Two or more races alone | 39,569 - 3.8% |
| Hispanic or Latino (of any race) | 255,560 - 24.4% |

Population reported at 2010 United States census
| The County | Total; Population | White | African; American | Native; American | Asian | Pacific; Islander | other races | two or more races | Hispanic or Latino (of any race) |
| Contra Costa County | 1,049,025 | 614,512 | 97,161 | 6,122 | 151,469 | 4,845 | 112,691 | 62,225 | 255,560 |
| Incorporated cities and towns | Total; Population | White | African; American | Native; American | Asian | Pacific; Islander | other races | two or more races | Hispanic or Latino (of any race) |
| Antioch | 102,372 | 50,083 | 17,667 | 887 | 10,709 | 817 | 14,310 | 7,899 | 32,436 |
| Brentwood | 51,481 | 34,969 | 3,389 | 333 | 4,051 | 202 | 4,964 | 3,573 | 13,779 |
| Clayton | 10,897 | 9,273 | 146 | 34 | 717 | 16 | 234 | 477 | 982 |
| Concord | 122,067 | 78,767 | 4,371 | 852 | 13,538 | 816 | 15,969 | 7,754 | 37,311 |
| Danville | 42,039 | 34,942 | 372 | 67 | 4,417 | 68 | 509 | 1,664 | 2,879 |
| El Cerrito | 23,549 | 12,543 | 1,819 | 107 | 6,439 | 37 | 1,079 | 1,525 | 2,621 |
| Hercules | 24,060 | 5,302 | 4,547 | 102 | 10,956 | 101 | 1,564 | 1,488 | 3,508 |
| Lafayette | 23,893 | 20,232 | 166 | 66 | 2,162 | 27 | 240 | 1,000 | 1,388 |
| Martinez | 35,824 | 27,603 | 1,303 | 255 | 2,876 | 121 | 1,425 | 2,241 | 5,258 |
| Moraga | 16,016 | 12,201 | 277 | 31 | 2,393 | 25 | 281 | 808 | 1,123 |
| Oakley | 35,432 | 22,641 | 2,582 | 314 | 2,236 | 142 | 4,998 | 2,519 | 12,364 |
| Orinda | 17,643 | 14,533 | 149 | 22 | 2,016 | 24 | 122 | 777 | 807 |
| Pinole | 18,390 | 8,488 | 2,458 | 147 | 4,220 | 64 | 1,741 | 1,272 | 4,005 |
| Pittsburg | 63,264 | 23,106 | 11,187 | 517 | 9,891 | 645 | 13,270 | 4,648 | 26,841 |
| Pleasant Hill | 33,152 | 24,846 | 686 | 127 | 4,516 | 66 | 1,079 | 1,832 | 4,009 |
| Richmond | 103,701 | 32,590 | 27,542 | 662 | 13,984 | 537 | 22,573 | 5,813 | 40,921 |
| San Pablo | 29,139 | 9,391 | 4,600 | 244 | 4,353 | 172 | 8,812 | 1,567 | 16,462 |
| San Ramon | 72,148 | 38,639 | 2,043 | 205 | 25,713 | 156 | 1,536 | 3,856 | 6,250 |
| Walnut Creek | 64,173 | 50,487 | 1,035 | 155 | 8,027 | 125 | 1,624 | 2,720 | 5,540 |
| Census-designated places | Total; Population | White | African; American | Native; American | Asian | Pacific; Islander | other races | two or more races | Hispanic or Latino (of any race) |
| Acalanes Ridge | 1,137 | 951 | 5 | 8 | 126 | 2 | 8 | 37 | 50 |
| Alamo | 14,570 | 12,662 | 73 | 18 | 1,190 | 22 | 126 | 479 | 839 |
| Alhambra Valley | 924 | 838 | 3 | 0 | 42 | 5 | 17 | 19 | 81 |
| Bay Point | 21,349 | 8,848 | 2,469 | 225 | 2,121 | 147 | 6,154 | 1,385 | 11,730 |
| Bayview | 1,754 | 871 | 186 | 18 | 369 | 9 | 179 | 122 | 521 |
| Bethel Island | 2,137 | 1,843 | 40 | 15 | 46 | 4 | 119 | 70 | 280 |
| Blackhawk | 9,354 | 6,882 | 172 | 15 | 1,801 | 8 | 75 | 401 | 464 |
| Byron | 1,277 | 911 | 61 | 11 | 4 | 11 | 224 | 55 | 503 |
| Camino Tassajara | 2,197 | 876 | 53 | 4 | 1,117 | 1 | 33 | 113 | 138 |
| Castle Hill | 1,299 | 1,112 | 29 | 1 | 110 | 2 | 9 | 36 | 78 |
| Clyde | 678 | 530 | 11 | 4 | 58 | 3 | 25 | 47 | 99 |
| Contra Costa Centre | 5,364 | 3,488 | 216 | 18 | 1,155 | 17 | 171 | 299 | 560 |
| Crockett | 3,094 | 2,468 | 146 | 31 | 108 | 24 | 123 | 194 | 490 |
| Diablo | 1,158 | 1,065 | 1 | 2 | 55 | 0 | 5 | 30 | 39 |
| Discovery Bay | 13,352 | 10,909 | 550 | 86 | 522 | 51 | 468 | 766 | 2,074 |
| East Richmond Heights | 3,280 | 1,995 | 395 | 13 | 407 | 8 | 187 | 275 | 465 |
| El Sobrante | 12,669 | 6,405 | 1,673 | 127 | 1,986 | 113 | 1,384 | 981 | 3,036 |
| Kensington | 5,077 | 3,963 | 131 | 15 | 610 | 2 | 58 | 298 | 263 |
| Knightsen | 1,568 | 1,268 | 14 | 8 | 28 | 3 | 162 | 85 | 454 |
| Montalvin Manor | 2,876 | 1,295 | 222 | 36 | 306 | 27 | 855 | 135 | 1,800 |
| Mountain View | 2,372 | 1,896 | 60 | 30 | 70 | 20 | 155 | 141 | 524 |
| Norris Canyon | 957 | 476 | 41 | 1 | 372 | 1 | 28 | 38 | 42 |
| North Gate | 679 | 566 | 1 | 0 | 65 | 0 | 19 | 28 | 56 |
| North Richmond | 3,717 | 634 | 1,239 | 23 | 431 | 18 | 1,191 | 181 | 1,862 |
| Pacheco | 3,685 | 2,814 | 78 | 27 | 366 | 11 | 201 | 188 | 619 |
| Port Costa | 190 | 172 | 2 | 2 | 7 | 0 | 0 | 7 | 10 |
| Reliez Valley | 3,101 | 2,693 | 31 | 4 | 233 | 2 | 30 | 108 | 192 |
| Rodeo | 8,679 | 3,823 | 1,410 | 53 | 1,762 | 62 | 885 | 684 | 2,134 |
| Rollingwood | 2,969 | 1,130 | 220 | 28 | 534 | 22 | 907 | 128 | 1,836 |
| San Miguel | 3,392 | 2,986 | 31 | 3 | 190 | 3 | 38 | 141 | 200 |
| Saranap | 5,202 | 4,275 | 70 | 15 | 451 | 10 | 113 | 268 | 437 |
| Shell Ridge | 959 | 821 | 5 | 2 | 73 | 6 | 8 | 44 | 59 |
| Tara Hills | 5,126 | 2,212 | 682 | 31 | 869 | 18 | 1,018 | 296 | 1,947 |
| Vine Hill | 3,761 | 2,568 | 111 | 33 | 196 | 35 | 561 | 257 | 1,169 |
| Other unincorporated areas | Total; Population | White | African; American | Native; American | Asian | Pacific; Islander | other races | two or more races | Hispanic or Latino (of any race) |
| All others not CDPs (combined) | 9,882 | 7,630 | 391 | 88 | 475 | 17 | 825 | 456 | 2,025 |

=== 2000 ===
As of the census of 2000, there were 948,816 people, 344,129 households, and 242,266 families residing in the county. The population density was 1,318 inhabitants per square mile (509/km^{2}). There were 354,577 housing units at an average density of 492 units per square mile (190 units/km^{2}).

Of residents who identified with European ethnicities, 9.0% were German, 7.7% Irish, 7.3% English, and 6.5% Italian ancestry according to Census 2000. 74.1% spoke English, 13.1% Spanish, and 2.6% Tagalog.

By 2005, 53.2% of Contra Costa County's population were non-Hispanic whites. African Americans made up 9.6% of the population, while ethnic Asians constituted 13.1%. Latinos, representing people of Spanish, Portuguese, indigenous and mestizo populations of the Western hemisphere, comprised 21.1% of the county population.

In 2000, there were 344,129 households, out of which 35.4% had children under the age of 18 living with them, 54.5% were married couples living together, 11.5% had a female householder with no husband present, and 29.6% were non-families. 22.9% of all households were made up of individuals, and 8.00% had someone living alone who was 65 years of age or older. The average household size was 2.72 and the average family size was 3.23.

In the county, the population was spread out, with:

- 26.5% under the age of 18
- 7.7% from 18 to 24
- 30.6% from 25 to 44
- 23.9% from 45 to 64
- 11.3% who were 65 years of age or older.

The median age was 36 years. For every 100 females there were 95.4 males. For every 100 females age 18 and over, there were 92.2 males.

The median income for a household in the county was $63,675, and the median income for a family was $73,039 (these figures had risen to $75,483 and $87,435 respectively as of a 2007 estimate).

Males had a median income of $52,670 versus $38,630 for females. The per capita income for the county was $30,615. About 5.4% of families and 7.6% of the population were below the poverty line, including 9.8% of those under age 18 and 6.0% of those age 65 or over.

In 2000, the largest denominational groups were Catholics (with 204,070 adherents) and Evangelical Protestants (with 74,449 adherents). The largest religious bodies were the Catholic Church (with 204,070 members) and The Baptist General Conference (with 24,803 members). The Rohr Jewish Learning Institute teaches courses in the county.

== Government policing and politics ==
The government of Contra Costa County operates as a general law county, defined and authorized under the California Constitution and law. It does not have a county charter. The county is governed by a five member board of supervisors who are elected by district to serve alternating four year terms. The county government provides countywide services such as elections and voter registration, law enforcement, jails, vital records, property records, tax collection, public health, and social services. In addition the County serves as the local government for all unincorporated areas.

Since 1932, Contra Costa County has been a Democratic stronghold in presidential elections. It temporarily leaned toward the Republican Party in the 1970s and 1980s, with successive presidential wins by Richard Nixon in 1972, Gerald Ford in 1976, and Ronald Reagan in 1980 and 1984. Reagan was the last Republican presidential candidate to win the county.

United States presidential election results for Contra Costa County, California
| Year | Republican | | Democratic | | Third party(ies) | |
| Year | No. | % | No. | % | No. | % |
|---|---|---|---|---|---|---|
| 1880 | 1,302 | 56.31% | 1,010 | 43.69% | 0 | 0.00% |
| 1884 | 1,496 | 55.86% | 1,114 | 41.60% | 68 | 2.54% |
| 1888 | 1,518 | 55.04% | 1,177 | 42.68% | 63 | 2.28% |
| 1892 | 1,631 | 51.79% | 1,332 | 42.30% | 186 | 5.91% |
| 1896 | 1,834 | 56.10% | 1,381 | 42.25% | 54 | 1.65% |
| 1900 | 2,165 | 57.02% | 1,549 | 40.80% | 83 | 2.19% |
| 1904 | 2,833 | 62.55% | 1,257 | 27.75% | 439 | 9.69% |
| 1908 | 3,336 | 60.61% | 1,599 | 29.05% | 569 | 10.34% |
| 1912 | 40 | 0.48% | 3,290 | 39.40% | 5,020 | 60.12% |
| 1916 | 5,731 | 44.05% | 6,092 | 46.82% | 1,188 | 9.13% |
| 1920 | 9,041 | 63.75% | 3,483 | 24.56% | 1,658 | 11.69% |
| 1924 | 9,061 | 54.67% | 1,114 | 6.72% | 6,398 | 38.60% |
| 1928 | 13,495 | 60.38% | 8,573 | 38.36% | 281 | 1.26% |
| 1932 | 10,907 | 37.33% | 17,218 | 58.94% | 1,089 | 3.73% |
| 1936 | 9,604 | 26.70% | 26,007 | 72.29% | 364 | 1.01% |
| 1940 | 18,627 | 37.22% | 30,900 | 61.75% | 513 | 1.03% |
| 1944 | 26,816 | 35.86% | 47,831 | 63.96% | 138 | 0.18% |
| 1948 | 36,958 | 40.45% | 50,277 | 55.02% | 4,141 | 4.53% |
| 1952 | 70,094 | 49.61% | 70,416 | 49.84% | 786 | 0.56% |
| 1956 | 74,971 | 50.98% | 71,733 | 48.78% | 347 | 0.24% |
| 1960 | 82,922 | 46.82% | 93,622 | 52.86% | 579 | 0.33% |
| 1964 | 65,011 | 36.47% | 113,071 | 63.44% | 163 | 0.09% |
| 1968 | 97,486 | 44.53% | 101,668 | 46.44% | 19,763 | 9.03% |
| 1972 | 139,044 | 54.13% | 111,718 | 43.49% | 6,122 | 2.38% |
| 1976 | 126,598 | 49.35% | 123,742 | 48.24% | 6,194 | 2.41% |
| 1980 | 144,112 | 50.12% | 107,398 | 37.35% | 36,035 | 12.53% |
| 1984 | 172,331 | 54.48% | 140,994 | 44.57% | 2,993 | 0.95% |
| 1988 | 158,652 | 47.86% | 169,411 | 51.10% | 3,448 | 1.04% |
| 1992 | 112,965 | 29.51% | 194,960 | 50.93% | 74,898 | 19.56% |
| 1996 | 123,954 | 35.15% | 196,512 | 55.73% | 32,136 | 9.11% |
| 2000 | 141,373 | 37.06% | 224,338 | 58.81% | 15,767 | 4.13% |
| 2004 | 150,608 | 36.46% | 257,254 | 62.28% | 5,166 | 1.25% |
| 2008 | 136,436 | 30.21% | 306,983 | 67.97% | 8,231 | 1.82% |
| 2012 | 136,517 | 31.15% | 290,824 | 66.36% | 10,885 | 2.48% |
| 2016 | 115,956 | 24.87% | 319,287 | 68.49% | 30,932 | 6.64% |
| 2020 | 152,877 | 26.30% | 416,386 | 71.63% | 12,053 | 2.07% |
| 2024 | 155,308 | 29.36% | 356,008 | 67.30% | 17,671 | 3.34% |

In the United States House of Representatives, Contra Costa County is split among three congressional districts:

- California's 8th congressional district, represented by Democrat John Garamendi
- California's 9th congressional district, represented by Democrat Josh Harder
- California's 10th congressional district, represented by Democrat Mark DeSaulnier

In the State Assembly, Contra Costa County is split among four districts:

- the 11th Assembly district, represented by Democrat Lori Wilson
- the 14th Assembly district, represented by Democrat Buffy Wicks
- the 15th Assembly district, represented by Democrat Anamarie Avila Farias
- the 16th Assembly district, represented by Democrat Rebecca Bauer-Kahan

In the State Senate, the county is split among three districts:

- the 3rd senatorial district, represented by Democrat Christopher Cabaldon
- the 7th senatorial district, represented by Democrat Jesse Arreguín
- the 9th senatorial district, represented by Democrat Tim Grayson

Democrats hold wide advantages in voter registration numbers in all political subdivisions in Contra Costa County. The Democrats' largest registration advantage in Contra Costa is in the cities of Richmond, where there is a 60.3% registration advantage with 3,192 Republicans (6.2%) out of 51,395 registered voters compared to 34,159 Democrats (66.5%) and 12,095 voters who have no party preference (23.5%); El Cerrito, where there is a 59.0% registration advantage with 1,169 Republicans (7.4%) out of 15,877 registered voters compared to 10,543 Democrats (67.6%) and 3,654 voters who have no party preference (23.0%); and San Pablo, where there is a 58.3% registration advantage with 641 Republicans (6.1%) out of 10,550 registered voters compared to 6,793 Democrats (64.4%) and 2,746 voters who have no party preference (26.0%).

=== Voter registration statistics ===
Population and registered voters
| Total eligible population | 803,842 | |
| Registered voters (Note: Percentage of registered voters with respect to total population. Percentages of party members with respect to registered voters follow.) | 701,969 | 87.3% |
| Democratic | 377,431 | 53.7% |
| Republican | 127,353 | 18.1% |
| Democratic–Republican spread | +250,078 | +35.6% |
| American Independent | 24,325 | 3.4% |
| Libertarian | 6,412 | 0.9% |
| Green | 3,064 | 0.4% |
| Peace and Freedom | 3,219 | 0.4% |
| Unknown | 2,787 | 0.3% |
| Other | 1,462 | 0.2% |
| No party preference | 155,916 | 22.2% |

==== Cities by population and voter registration ====
Cities by population and voter registration
| City | Population | Registered Voters | Democratic | Republican | D–R Spread | Other | No Party Preference |
|---|---|---|---|---|---|---|---|
| Antioch | 111,502 | 54,528 (48.9%) | 28,784 (52.8%) | 8,096 (14.8%) | +38.0% | 2,647 (4.9%) | 15,012 (27.5%) |
| Brentwood | 64,474 | 34,774 (53.9%) | 13,974 (40.2%) | 9,710 (27.9%) | +12.3% | 1,714 (4.9%) | 9,376 (27.0%) |
| Clayton | 12,265 | 8,078 (65.9%) | 3,128 (38.7%) | 2,685 (33.2%) | +5.3% | 377 (4.7%) | 1,888 (23.4%) |
| Concord | 129,295 | 66,218 (51.2%) | 31,054 (46.9%) | 13,277 (20.0%) | +26.9% | 3,433 (5.2%) | 18,454 (27.9%) |
| Danville | 44,510 | 30,076 (67.6%) | 10,412 (34.6%) | 10,381 (34.5%) | +0.1% | 1,320 (4.6%) | 7,963 (26.5%) |
| El Cerrito | 25,508 | 16,304 (63.9%) | 10,560 (64.8%) | 1,020 (6.3%) | +58.5% | 568 (3.5%) | 4,156 (25.5%) |
| Hercules | 26,276 | 14,871 (56.6%) | 8,291 (55.7%) | 1,646 (11.1%) | +44.6% | 490 (3.3%) | 4,444 (29.9%) |
| Lafayette | 26,638 | 18,087 (67.9%) | 8,492 (47.0%) | 4,198 (23.2%) | +23.8% | 723 (4.0%) | 4,674 (25.8%) |
| Martinez | 38,297 | 24,261 (63.3%) | 11,712 (48.3%) | 5,020 (20.7%) | +27.6% | 1,335 (5.5%) | 6,194 (25.5%) |
| Moraga | 17,783 | 11,024 (62.0%) | 4,737 (43.0%) | 2,766 (25.1%) | +17.9% | 416 (3.7%) | 3,105 (28.2%) |
| Oakley | 42,543 | 21,468 (50.5%) | 9,868 (46.0%) | 4,743 (22.1%) | +23.9% | 1045 (4.8%) | 5,812 (27.1%) |
| Orinda | 19,926 | 14,020 (70.4%) | 6,692 (47.7%) | 3,176 (22.7%) | +25.0% | 490 (3.5%) | 3,662 (26.1%) |
| Pinole | 19,250 | 11,347 (58.9%) | 6,365 (56.1%) | 1,525 (13.4%) | +42.7% | 464 (4.1%) | 2,993 (26.4%) |
| Pittsburg | 72,588 | 33,751 (46.5%) | 18,644 (55.2%) | 3,817 (11.3%) | +43.9% | 1,402 (4.2%) | 9,888 (29.3%) |
| Pleasant Hill | 34,839 | 21,697 (62.3%) | 10,345 (47.7%) | 4,274 (19.7%) | +28.0% | 1104 (5.1%) | 5,974 (27.5%) |
| Richmond | 110,567 | 52,364 (47.4%) | 33,166 (63.3%) | 2,979 (5.7%) | +57.6% | 2,111 (4.1%) | 14,108 (26.9%) |
| San Pablo | 30,990 | 11,121 (35.9%) | 6,756 (60.7%) | 626 (5.6%) | +55.1% | 458 (4.2%) | 3,281 (29.5%) |
| San Ramon | 75,995 | 41,872 (55.1%) | 16,518 (39.4%) | 8,908 (21.3%) | +18.1% | 1,388 (3.5%) | 12,267 (30.8%) |
| Walnut Creek | 70,166 | 46,149 (65.8%) | 21,391 (46.4%) | 10,708 (23.2%) | +23.2% | 1,903 (4.1%) | 12,147 (26.3%) |
| Unincorporated Areas | 180,114 | 99,030 (55.0%) | 44,972 (45.4%) | 22,810 (23.0%) | +22.4% | 4,595 (4.6%) | 26,653 (26.9%) |
| TOTAL | 1,153,526 | 631,040 (54.7%) | 305,850 (48.5%) | 122,364 (19.4%) | +29.1% | 28,140 (4.4%) | 174,686 (27.7%) |

== Crime ==
The following table includes the number of incidents reported and the rate per 1,000 persons for each type of offense.

Population and crime rates
| Population | 1,037,817 | |
| Violent crime | 4,257 | 4.10 |
| Homicide | 89 | 0.09 |
| Forcible rape | 200 | 0.19 |
| Robbery | 1,733 | 1.67 |
| Aggravated assault | 2,235 | 2.15 |
| Property crime | 19,843 | 19.12 |
| Burglary | 7,361 | 7.09 |
| Larceny-theft | 17,212 | 16.58 |
| Motor vehicle theft | 6,492 | 6.26 |
| Arson | 213 | 0.21 |

=== Cities by population and crime rates (2019) ===
Cities by population and crime rates (2019)
| City | Population | Violent crimes | Violent crime rate per 1,000 persons | Property crimes | Property crime rate per 1,000 persons |
|---|---|---|---|---|---|
| Antioch | 112,641 | 648 | 5.75 | 3,199 | 28.4 |
| Brentwood | 65,483 | 166 | 2.54 | 1,335 | 20.39 |
| Clayton | 12,356 | 1 | 0.08 | 155 | 12.54 |
| Concord | 130,615 | 541 | 4.14 | 4,560 | 34.91 |
| Danville | 44,997 | 23 | 0.51 | 296 | 6.58 |
| El Cerrito | 25,857 | 152 | 5.88 | 1,300 | 50.28 |
| Hercules | 25,789 | 31 | 1.2 | 341 | 13.22 |
| Lafayette | 26,872 | 4 | 0.15 | 358 | 13.32 |
| Martinez | 38,692 | 83 | 2.15 | 570 | 14.73 |
| Moraga | 17,908 | 23 | 1.28 | 124 | 6.92 |
| Oakley | 43,014 | 51 | 1.19 | 497 | 11.55 |
| Orinda | 20,071 | 17 | 0.85 | 195 | 9.72 |
| Pinole | 19,439 | 59 | 3.04 | 866 | 44.55 |
| Pittsburg | 73,637 | 446 | 6.06 | 1,660 | 22.54 |
| Pleasant Hill | 35,125 | 88 | 2.51 | 1,484 | 42.25 |
| Richmond | 110,988 | 1,034 | 9.32 | 4,188 | 37.73 |
| San Pablo | 31,336 | 194 | 6.19 | 1,009 | 32.2 |
| San Ramon | 84,605 | 58 | 0.69 | 1,099 | 12.99 |
| Walnut Creek | 70,546 | 120 | 1.7 | 2,496 | 35.38 |

== Economy ==
=== Agriculture ===
The great rancheros of the Spanish period were divided and sold for agricultural uses, with intensively irrigated farming made possible in some areas by the development of canals that brought water from the eastern riverside portions of the county to the central portion. Other areas could use the more limited water available from local creeks and from wells. Orchards dominated where such water was available, while other, seasonally dry areas were used for cattle ranching. In central parts of the county walnuts were an especially attractive orchard crop, using the thin-shelled English Walnut branches grafted to the hardy and disease-resistant American Walnut root stock. In the Moraga region, pears dominated, and many old (but untended) roadside trees are still picked seasonally by passers-by. In eastern county, stone fruit, especially cherries, is still grown commercially, with seasonal opportunities for people to pick their own fruit for a modest fee.

=== Irrigation canals ===
The Contra Costa Canal, a concrete-lined and fenced irrigation canal still makes a loop through central county and provided industrial and agricultural grade water to farms and industry. While no longer used for extensive irrigation, it is still possible for adjoining landowners (now large suburban lot owners) to obtain pumping permits. Most of this water is destined for the heavy industry near Martinez. As with the railroad rights of way there is now an extensive public trail system along these canals.

=== Commuter railroads ===
The development of commuter railroads proceeded together with the subdivision of farms into parcels. In some cases, such as the development of Saranap, the same developer controlled both the railroad (Sacramento Northern) and the development. These early suburbanization developments were an extension of the earlier development of trolley car suburbs in what are now considered the highly urban environments of the near East Bay.

=== Heavy industry ===
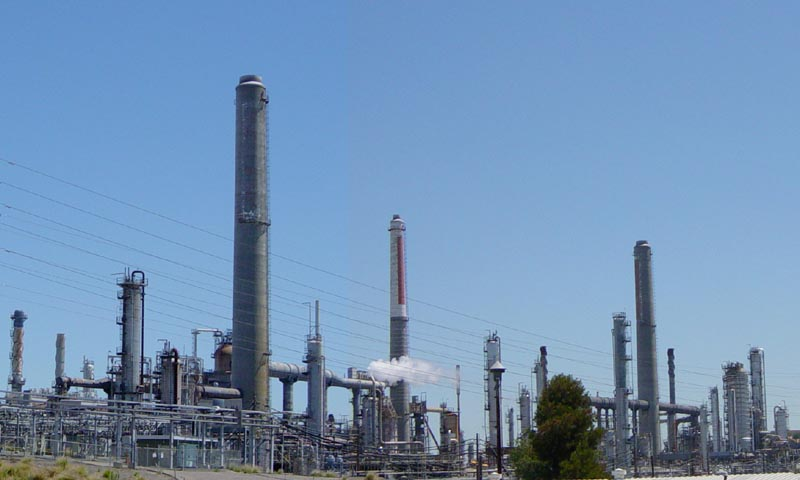
View of the Shell Martinez oil refinery

Owing to its extensive waterfront on San Francisco, San Pablo, and Suisun bays the northwestern and northern segments have long been sites for heavy industry, including a number of still active oil refineries (particularly Chevron in Richmond, Phillips 66 in Rodeo, Shell Oil (now PBF) and Tesoro (now Marathon)- in Martinez), chemical plants (Dow Chemical) and a once substantial integrated steel plant, United States Steel, now reduced to secondary production of strip sheet and wire. The San Joaquin River forms a continuation of the northern boundary turns southward to form the eastern boundary of the county. Some substantial Sacramento-San Joaquin Delta "islands" (actually leveed former marshes) are included in this corner of the county.

=== Housing ===
==== West County ====
The West County is the area near or on San Francisco and San Pablo bays. The housing stock in the region was extensively developed after the great San Francisco earthquake of 1906. Much of the housing stock in these areas is becoming quite expensive. As an alternative to moving to either the expensive central county, or the too-distant East County, this area is becoming gentrified, with a mix of races and income levels — a character actively sought by some housing purchasers. The downside of this is a corresponding lack of affordable housing for those working lower-paying service jobs — a problem endemic throughout the region. There has recently been a housing boom or tract housing in Richmond and also in the Hercules areas. These gentrifying areas are the most diverse in Contra Costa County.

==== Central county ====
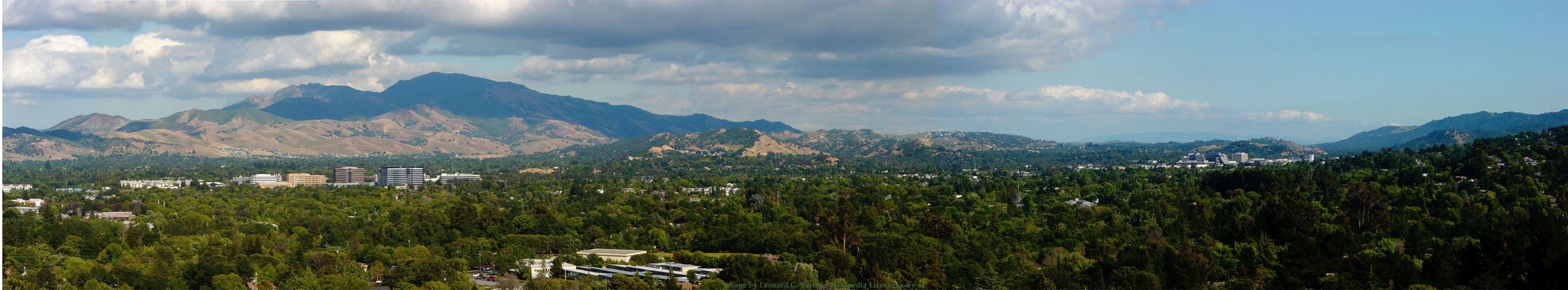
Central county scene — Mount Diablo, Concord, Pleasant Hill, and Walnut Creek

The central part of the county is a valley traversed by Interstate 680 and Highway 24. The towns east of the hills, on or near Highway 24 and their surrounding areas (Lafayette, Moraga and Orinda) are collectively known as Lamorinda. The major central county cities along Interstate 680 are Martinez, Concord, Pleasant Hill, Walnut Creek, Danville, San Ramon, and unincorporated Alamo. Owing to the high quality of its public schools (due largely to both demographics and added support from prosperous parents), this area has become a magnet for well–off families with children. During the real estate boom, housing prices were driven to astounding levels. From 2007, home prices in the region have seen substantial decreases and the affordability rate has risen. During the real estate boom, the high price of homes and scarcity of land resulted in many speculators purchasing older, smaller homes and partially or completely tearing them down to construct larger homes.

In this way the central county region has become a mix of older suburbs, newer developments, small lot "infill" developments, and extensive shopping areas.

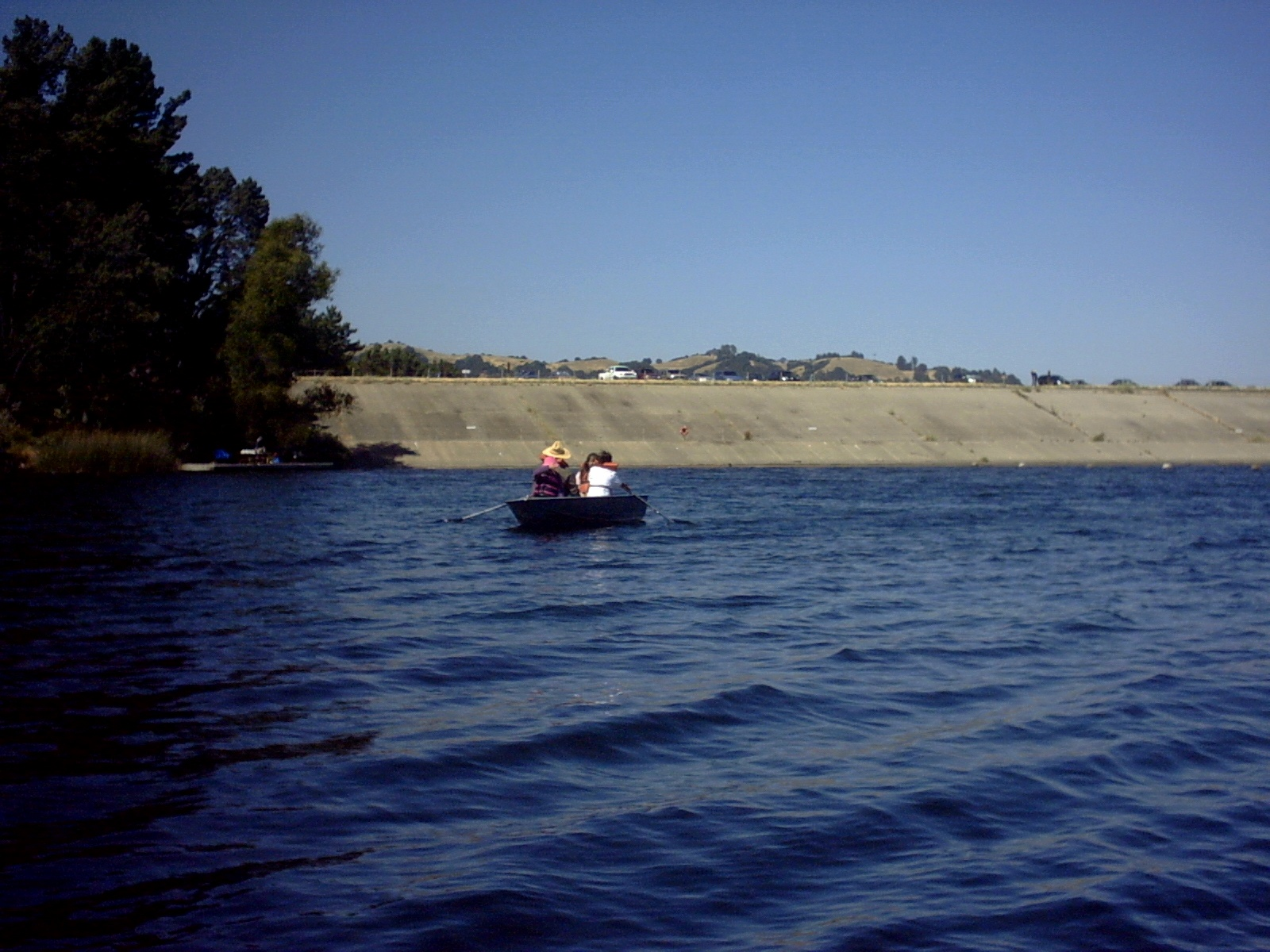
Lafayette Reservoir

==== East County ====
Lower cost modern tract developments continue along Suisun Bay in the "East County" towns of Pittsburg, Antioch, and Oakley - new "bedroom" communities" to serve the now "edge cities". The median income of a family in the two relatively affluent East County towns of Brentwood and Discovery Bay is approaching $100k/yr. placing them in the top fifteen percent of affluent towns in the United States. California Distinguished Schools, golf courses, vineyards, and upscale homes are found in Brentwood and Discovery Bay. Discovery Bay is based on a waterfront community of 3,500+ homes with private docks with access to the Sacramento-San Joaquin River Delta. Discovery Bay also features gated and non-gated "off-water" communities with homes from 1,400 square feet (130 square metres) up to 4,700 square feet (440 square metres).

From 2010 to 2018 Highway 4 underwent multimillion-dollar improvements from that added lanes through Brentwood, Antioch and Pittsburg to reduce driving time between East County and Concord/Walnut Creek, as this commute at one time was the 10th worst in the nation. Vasco Road is also an important link between East County/Brentwood and Livermore. Additionally, a county road from Brentwood to Tracy has received Federal Funds to be upgraded to a highway link between the areas.

=== County budget problems ===
Across 30 years, two forces combined to create county budget problems, peaking in 2008. First, rather than compensate police, medical, and firefighting personnel directly, health and retirement benefits were granted without proper actuarial examination, leading to unexpected but predictable high costs as personnel aged and ultimately retired with continued "first class" health and retirement benefits. Second, the collapse of the "housing bubble" enabled purchasers of distressed properties — many of which were owned by banks and other mortgage holders — to petition for lower property assessments, in many cases reducing by half the revenue to the county for specific parcels. Continuing downturns in employment prospects further increased the needs for various social services. These deficits and demands, combined with a lack of support from a similarly stressed California state government and the United States Federal government, required county supervisors and service providers to allocate limited resources in a time of increasing demand. The projected budget deficit was $45 million as of early 2011. Perhaps more significantly, the total unfunded liability for retiree benefits is $2.4 billion.

=== Corporate headquarters ===
By the early 1990s, 22 million square feet of office space had been built along the 680 corridor, that segment of Interstate Highway 680 that extends from Concord in the north to San Ramon in the south, continuing into inland Alameda County from Dublin to Pleasanton. During the 1980s and early 1990s, many corporations that were formerly housed in the more central metropolitan area followed their employees by moving to these large suburban and edge city office areas and office parks.

=== Redevelopment ===
There are currently political fights over the potential redevelopment of the county seat (Martinez), with long-term residents and many elsewhere in the county concerned that it will lose its remaining small-town charm and utility in an effort to become more like the county's major recreational shopping center of Walnut Creek.

The inland portions of the Concord Naval Weapons Station have been declared surplus by the Federal government and this area is expected to provide what is likely the last opportunity to plan and build city-sized development within the central county. This area will become a portion of the city of Concord, and planners expect that development will be confined to the lower and flatter portions of the depot, with the remainder becoming a substantial addition to the county's open space. Much of the land to be developed is relatively flat grassland and the most prominent structures are ammunition bunkers that will be removed, so future uses of the property are largely unconstrained by previous uses.

== Education ==
The Contra Costa Community College District is a community college district that encompasses three community colleges: Contra Costa College, Diablo Valley College, and Los Medanos College.

The Contra Costa County Library is the county's library system.

K-12 school districts in the county:

- Antioch Unified School District
- John Swett Unified School District
- Livermore Valley Joint Unified School District
- Martinez Unified School District
- Mount Diablo Unified School District
- Pittsburg Unified School District
- San Ramon Valley Unified School District
- West Contra Costa Unified School District

Secondary school districts in the county:

- Acalanes Union High School District
- Liberty Union High School District

Elementary school districts in the county:

- Brentwood Union Elementary School District
- Byron Union Elementary School District
- Canyon Elementary School District
- Knightsen Elementary School District
- Lafayette Elementary School District
- Moraga Elementary School District
- Oakley Union Elementary School District
- Orinda Union Elementary School District
- Walnut Creek Elementary School District

== Media ==
Contra Costa County receives media from the rest of the Bay Area.

The City of Concord is served by the daily newspaper, the East Bay Times published by the Bay Area News Group-East Bay (part of the Media News Group, Denver, Colorado), with offices in Walnut Creek. The paper was originally a paper run and owned by the Lesher family. Since the death of Dean Lesher in 1993, the paper has had several owners. The publisher also issues weekly local papers, such as the Concord Transcript, which is the local paper for Concord and nearby Clayton.

In December 2019, there was a flurry of reports from reliable sources including the Associated Press and the San Francisco Chronicle that the 161-year-old Martinez News-Gazette, one of the longest-running newspapers in California, may have to cease publication. But as of late May 2020, the threatened cessation did not materialize and the newspaper appears to have weathered that storm. The newspaper did cease publication of a print edition effective April 2, 2020, but this was characterized as a temporary measure arising from a lack of advertising revenue. Since March 2020, this in turn arose as many local businesses were forced to suspended operations or even ceased to exist, when the area was under shelter-in-place regulations arising from COVID-19 pandemic. The newspaper plans to resume a full print edition when the local shelter-in-place restrictions are lifted.

== Transportation ==
Prior to 1903, most travel to central Contra Costa County was by boat or rail to Martinez on the northern waterfront and from there to the industrial areas east along the waterfront as well as farming regions to the south.

In 1903, the first tunnel through the Oakland hills (now Old Tunnel Road) was built, principally as a means of bringing hay by horse-, mule-, or ox-drawn wagons from central and eastern agricultural areas to feed the draft animals that provided the power to public and private transportation in the East Bay at the time. The tunnel exited in the hills high above the crossroads of Orinda with the road continuing on to Lafayette, Walnut Creek, and Danville. The road was just wide enough for one car in each direction and had no shoulders.

In 1937, the two-bore Caldecott Tunnel for road vehicles was completed, making interior Contra Costa County much more accessible. After World War II, the tunnels allowed waves of development to proceed, oriented toward Oakland rather than the northern shoreline, and the northern shoreline cities began to decline. The tunnel has since been augmented with a third bore, completed in 1964, and a fourth, completed in 2013.

=== Major highways ===
- I-80
- I-580
- I-680
- SR 4
- SR 24
- SR 123 – former US 40
- SR 160
- SR 242

=== Mass transit ===
- Amtrak runs its Gold Runner line to Southern California and its Capitol Corridor line to Sacramento and San Jose through stations in Richmond, Martinez, and Antioch-Pittsburg.
- BART, a high-speed commuter rail system, functions as the Bay Area's metro system.
  - eBART (East Contra Costa County BART extension) is designed to bring rapid transit services along the Highway 4 corridor.
- AC Transit provides local service in West County and in Orinda, in addition to western Alameda County, Transbay commuter services to San Francisco, bus rapid transit lines and the bulk of All Nighter service for the East Bay.
- County Connection provides local service in Central C.C. County and connecting services to Dublin and Pittsburg.
- Tri-Delta Transit provides local bus service in East C.C. County and connecting regional services to Martinez, Livermore, and Stockton.
- WestCAT provides local bus service in northern West C.C. County with connecting service to BART and transbay service to the city (San Francisco).
- Golden Gate Transit provides connecting transbay service between Marin County and Richmond and El Cerrito del Norte BART stations via the Richmond-San Rafael Bridge.
- Vallejo Transit and Fairfield and Suisun Transit provide regional feeder service to El Cerrito del Norte BART from Solano County.
- Benicia Transit provides commuter service between the Vallejo Ferry Terminal and BART in Concord through Benicia in Solano County.

=== Airports ===
The county has two general aviation airports:

- Buchanan Field Airport, located in Concord
- Byron Airport, located two miles (3.2 km) south of Byron

JetSuiteX provides four times weekly service from Concord Airport (CCR) to Las Vegas, Burbank, and Santa Ana.

=== Railroads ===
The western termini of several original transcontinental railroad routes have been located in Oakland, in Alameda County, including Union Pacific, Southern Pacific, and Santa Fe railroads. From Oakland, there are two primary routes east:

- The former Southern Pacific (originally Central Pacific Railroad) line north through Richmond, closely hugging the San Pablo Bay coastline to Martinez, where it crosses Suisun Bay on a drawbridge before proceeding to Sacramento and the crossing of the Sierra Nevada via Donner
- The former Western Pacific Railroad line, which runs east through Niles Canyon, Livermore and over Altamont Pass, en route in a north-easterly direction to Sacramento and the Feather River canyon/Beckwourth Pass crossing of the Sierra Nevada

Formed in 1909, the Oakland Antioch Railway was renamed the Oakland Antioch & Eastern Railway in 1911. It extended through a 3,400-foot (1,000 m) tunnel in the Oakland Hills, from Oakland to Walnut Creek, Concord and on to Bay Point.

The current owner of the Santa Fe Railroad's assets, BNSF Railway, has the terminus of its transcontinental route in Richmond. Originally built by the San Francisco and San Joaquin Valley Railroad in 1896, the line was purchased by the Atchison, Topeka and Santa Fe Railway shortly thereafter. The line leaves Richmond through industrial and residential parts of West County before striking due east through Franklin Canyon and Martinez on its way to Stockton, Bakersfield, and Barstow.

These railroads spurred the development of industry in the county throughout the late 19th and early 20th centuries, particularly driving development of the Standard Oil (now Chevron) refinery and port complex in Richmond.

There were a large number of short lines in the county between the late 19th century and the early 20th century. The rights of way of a number of these railroads also served as utility rights of way, particularly for water service, and so were preserved and in the late 20th century enhanced as walking, jogging, and bicycle riding trails in the central portion of the county.

== Attractions ==
- Black Diamond Mines Regional Preserve
- Blackhawk Museum (This site also contains a paleontological museum of the University of California, Berkeley)
- John Marsh House (not open to the public)
- Eugene O'Neill National Historic Site
- John Muir National Historic Site
- Lindsay Wildlife Museum
- Don Francisco Galindo House
- Don Salvio Pacheco Adobe
- Martinez Adobe
- San Ramon Valley Museum
- Borges Ranch
- Richmond Museum of History
- Rosie the Riveter/World War II Home Front National Historical Park
- Vasco Caves Regional Preserve

== Parks and recreation ==
- Briones Regional Park
- Diablo Foothills
- Howe Homestead Park
- Marsh Creek State Park - not open to the public
- Mount Diablo State Park
- Las Trampas Regional Wilderness
- Shell Ridge Open Space
- Lime Ridge Open Space
- San Pablo Recreation Area (San Pablo Dam Reservoir)
- Sugarloaf Open Space
- Acalanes Ridge Open Space
- Point Isabel Regional Shoreline in Richmond is the largest dog park in the country.
- Adjoining or nearby these parks are lands of the East Bay Municipal Utility District. These require special annual permits for hiking, bicycle riding and horse riding, available for a small fee. At least one member of a party traversing these areas must have such a permit.

=== Trails ===
- Iron Horse Regional Trail
- California State Riding and Hiking Trail
- Contra Costa Canal Regional Trail
- Delta de Anza Regional Trail
- Briones-Mount Diablo Regional Trail
- Lafayette-Moraga Regional Trail
- Marsh Creek Regional Trail
- American Discovery Trail
- Hiking trails in Contra Costa County

== Utilities ==
- Central Contra Costa Sanitary District
- Contra Costa Water District
- East Bay Municipal Utility District

== Communities ==
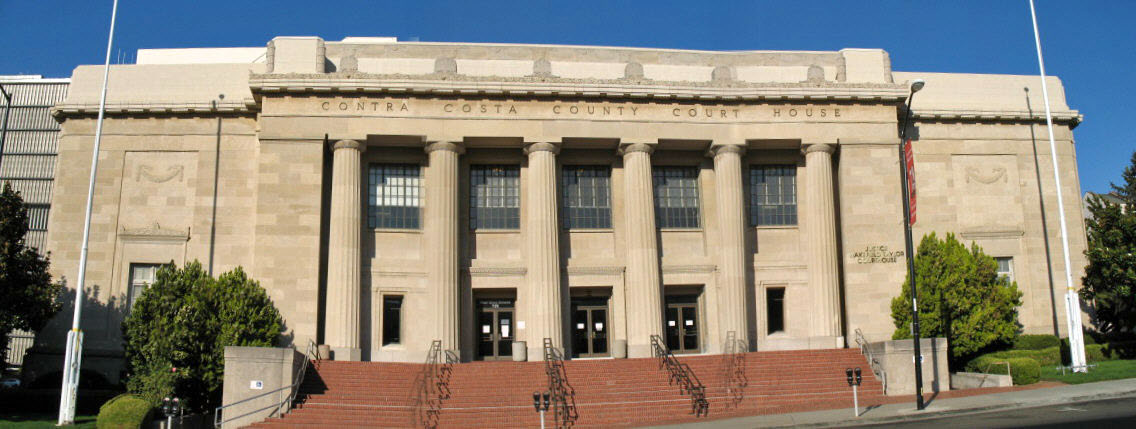
Martinez Court House

=== Cities ===
- Antioch
- Brentwood
- Clayton
- Concord
- El Cerrito
- Hercules
- Lafayette
- Martinez (county seat)
- Oakley
- Orinda
- Pinole
- Pittsburg
- Pleasant Hill
- Richmond
- San Pablo
- San Ramon
- Walnut Creek

=== Towns ===
- Danville
- Moraga

=== Census-designated places ===
- Acalanes Ridge
- Alamo
- Alhambra Valley
- Bay Point
- Bayview
- Bethel Island
- Blackhawk
- Byron
- Camino Tassajara
- Castle Hill
- Clyde
- Contra Costa Centre
- Crockett
- Diablo
- Discovery Bay
- East Richmond Heights
- El Sobrante
- Kensington
- Knightsen
- Montalvin Manor
- Mountain View
- Norris Canyon
- North Gate
- North Richmond
- Pacheco
- Port Costa
- Reliez Valley
- Rodeo
- Rollingwood
- Saranap
- San Miguel
- Shell Ridge
- Tara Hills
- Vine Hill

=== Unincorporated communities ===
- Canyon
- Hasford Heights

=== Former communities ===
- Bayview-Montalvin
- Port Chicago

Ohmer was a rail station located on the Oakland, Antioch and Eastern Railroad 6 miles (9.7 km) east of Martinez, which still appeared on maps as of 1947. Though primarily just a rail station, it was sometimes referred to as a community.

=== Ghost towns ===
- Judsonville
- Nortonville
- Point of Timber Landing
- Somersville
- Stewartville
- West Hartley

=== Other places ===
- Byron Hot Springs, 1941-1945 as Camp Tracy, for Japanese and German POWs
- Livorna
- Rossmoor - a senior development incorporated into Walnut Creek (not to be confused with the Southern California Rossmoor).

=== Population ranking ===
The population ranking of the following table is based on the 2020 census of Contra Costa County.

† county seat

| Rank | City/Town/etc. | Municipal type | Population (2020 Census) |
|---|---|---|---|
| 1 | Concord | City | 125,410 |
| 2 | Richmond | City | 116,448 |
| 3 | Antioch | City | 115,291 |
| 4 | San Ramon | City | 84,605 |
| 5 | Pittsburg | City | 76,416 |
| 6 | Walnut Creek | City | 70,127 |
| 7 | Brentwood | City | 64,292 |
| 8 | Danville | Town | 43,582 |
| 9 | Oakley | City | 43,357 |
| 10 | † Martinez | City | 37,287 |
| 11 | Pleasant Hill | City | 34,613 |
| 12 | San Pablo | City | 32,127 |
| 13 | Hercules | City | 26,016 |
| 14 | El Cerrito | City | 25,962 |
| 15 | Lafayette | City | 25,391 |
| 16 | Bay Point | CDP | 23,896 |
| 17 | Orinda | City | 19,514 |
| 18 | Pinole | City | 19,022 |
| 19 | Moraga | Town | 16,870 |
| 20 | El Sobrante | CDP | 15,524 |
| 21 | Discovery Bay | CDP | 15,358 |
| 22 | Alamo | CDP | 15,314 |
| 23 | Clayton | City | 11,070 |
| 24 | Rodeo | CDP | 9,653 |
| 25 | Blackhawk | CDP | 9,637 |
| 26 | Contra Costa Centre | CDP | 6,808 |
| 27 | Saranap | CDP | 5,830 |
| 28 | Kensington | CDP | 5,428 |
| 29 | Tara Hills | CDP | 5,364 |
| 30 | Camino Tassajara | CDP | 4,951 |
| 31 | Vine Hill | CDP | 4,323 |
| 32 | Pacheco | CDP | 4,183 |
| 33 | North Richmond | CDP | 4,175 |
| 34 | San Miguel | CDP | 3,591 |
| 35 | East Richmond Heights | CDP | 3,460 |
| 36 | Reliez Valley | CDP | 3,354 |
| 37 | Crockett | CDP | 3,242 |
| 38 | Montalvin Manor | CDP | 3,099 |
| 39 | Rollingwood | CDP | 3,015 |
| 40 | Mountain View | CDP | 2,622 |
| 41 | Bethel Island | CDP | 2,131 |
| 42 | Bayview | CDP | 1,782 |
| 43 | Knightsen | CDP | 1,596 |
| 44 | Castle Hill | CDP | 1,271 |
| 45 | Diablo | CDP | 1,255 |
| 46 | Byron | CDP | 1,140 |
| 47 | Acalanes Ridge | CDP | 1,285 |
| 48 | Shell Ridge | CDP | 1,014 |
| 49 | Norris Canyon | CDP | 1,313 |
| 50 | Alhambra Valley | CDP | 805 |
| 51 | North Gate | CDP | 667 |
| 52 | Clyde | CDP | 729 |
| 53 | Port Costa | CDP | 190 |

== See also ==
- National Register of Historic Places listings in Contra Costa County, California
- List of museums in San Francisco Bay Area, California
- Stege, California, former unincorporated area within the county
