= North Gate, California =

Census-designated place in United States

North Gate
- Census-designated place
- Position in California.
- Coordinates: 37°54′22″N 121°59′53″W
- Country: United States
- State: California
- County: Contra Costa

Area
  - Total: 0.735 sq mi (1.90 km^{2})
  - Land: 0.735 sq mi (1.90 km^{2})
  - Water: 0 sq mi (0 km^{2}) 0%
- Elevation: 253 ft (77 m)

Population (2020)
  - Total: 667
  - Density: 907/sq mi (350/km^{2})
- Time zone: UTC-8 (Pacific (PST))
  - Summer (DST): UTC-7 (PDT)
- ZIP code: 94598
- Area code: 925
- FIPS code: 06-51890
- GNIS feature ID: 2583095

North Gate is a census-designated place in Contra Costa County, California, United States. North Gate sits at an elevation of 253 feet (77 m). The 2020 United States census reported North Gate's population was 667.

== Geography ==
According to the United States Census Bureau, the CDP has a total area of 0.735 square mile (1.90 km^{2}), all land.

== Demographics ==
Historical population
Census	Pop.	Note	%±
2010	679		—
2020	667		−1.8%
U.S. Decennial Census; 2010

North Gate first appeared as a census designated place in the 2010 U.S. census formed from part of the Alamo CDP and additional area.

The 2020 United States census reported that North Gate had a population of 667. The population density was 907.5 inhabitants per square mile (350.4/km^{2}). The racial makeup of North Gate was 73.6% White, 0.3% African American, 0.0% Native American, 10.8% Asian, 0.0% Pacific Islander, 2.4% from other races, and 12.9% from two or more races. Hispanic or Latino of any race were 10.2% of the population.

The whole population lived in households, no one lived in non-institutionalized group quarters and no one was institutionalized.

There were 251 households, out of which 30.3% included children under the age of 18, 66.1% were married-couple households, 4.0% were cohabiting couple households, 21.1% had a female householder with no partner present, and 8.8% had a male householder with no partner present. 17.1% of households were one person, and 9.6% were one person aged 65 or older. The average household size was 2.66. There were 199 families (79.3% of all households).

The age distribution was 17.1% under the age of 18, 6.3% aged 18 to 24, 15.4% aged 25 to 44, 37.6% aged 45 to 64, and 23.5% who were 65 years of age or older. The median age was 53.6 years. For every 100 females, there were 90.0 males.

There were 260 housing units at an average density of 353.7 units per square mile (136.6 units/km^{2}), of which 251 (96.5%) were occupied. Of these, 90.8% were owner-occupied, and 9.2% were occupied by renters.

== Education ==
It is in the Mount Diablo Unified School District.
