= Eriogonum truncatum =

Mount Diablo buckwheat

Conservation status
- Critically Imperiled (NatureServe)

Scientific classification
- Kingdom: Plantae
- Clade: Tracheophytes
- Clade: Angiosperms
- Clade: Eudicots
- Order: Caryophyllales
- Family: Polygonaceae
- Genus: Eriogonum
- Species: E. truncatum

Binomial name
- Eriogonum truncatum (Torr.) A. Gray

Species of wild buckwheat

Eriogonum truncatum, the Mount Diablo buckwheat, is a small pink wildflower, believed to have been extinct since 1936 until its rediscovery in 2005. The species is only known to live on Mount Diablo in Contra Costa County, northern California.

== Habitat ==
It has been found on the edge of chaparral but may be a refugee there, squeezed out of more open areas by exotics. Since its rediscovery seeds have been collected for controlled propagation and preservation.

== Description ==
Mt. Diablo buckwheat is an annual plant growing between 150–750 millimetres (5.9 in – 2 ft 5.5 in) high. It blooms with several dozen pinkish flowers, having a maroon line down the center of each petal. The flower stalks branch upward in a wishbone pattern, with flowers blooming at the joint and ends of the wishbone.

== History ==
The first recorded sighting of Mt. Diablo buckwheat was by William H. Brewer, the first Chair of Agriculture at the Yale University Sheffield Scientific School. He was Principal Assistant for botany on the Josiah Whitney-led California Geological Survey from 1860–1864. Brewer first recorded the Mt. Diablo buckwheat at John Marsh's Rancho Los Meganos at the northeast corner of Mt. Diablo, on May 29, 1862. Marsh was the first American settler in Contra Costa County (the present-day San Francisco East Bay) and a proponent of increased American emigration. Approximately 4,000 acres (16 km²) of the Marsh Ranch have been preserved around Marsh's stone house in the new Cowell Ranch State Park. From 1862–1936 the Mount Diablo buckwheat was found just a handful of times, for a total of seven historic records.

In 1936 Mary Leolin Bowerman, a graduate student at the University of California, Berkeley and who later co-founded the Save Mount Diablo organization in 1971, recorded the last sighting of Mt. Diablo buckwheat. Bowerman made two of the seven historic records, on opposite sides of Mt. Diablo, Contra Costa County, California during her floristic study between 1930 and 1936. Her 1936 Ph.D. was followed in 1944 by publication of The Flowering Plants and Ferns of Mt. Diablo, California. Much of Mt. Diablo has been preserved in the years since Bowerman's study was completed, as well as areas where other buckwheat records were established. However, the eastern areas of the plant's range are threatened by development pressure.

Until 2005 numerous botanical survey trips were unsuccessful in locating the buckwheat.

=== 2005 rediscovery ===
On May 10, 2005, Michael Park, a University of California, Berkeley graduate student, was conducting a floristic study on Mt. Diablo. While more thoroughly searching promising areas on the mountain that hadn't gotten enough attention, he realized he was surrounded by early blooming buckwheat. Once he realized that it was Mount Diablo buckwheat he was so shocked that: "I pretended it wasn't there and continued with my other work."

A week after the rediscovery, a collaboration of organizations including the California Department of Parks & Recreation, Save Mount Diablo, and the University of California at Berkeley announced the rediscovery of the Mt. Diablo buckwheat. Coming soon after the announcement of the potential rediscovery of the ivory-billed woodpecker, the news traveled around the world in just a few days and appeared in thousands of media outlets including print, radio and television.

==== Propagation ====
Seeds were collected from wild plants in 2005. On June 7, 2006, members of the Mt. Diablo Buckwheat Working Group announced that the plant had survived and increased in the wild and that twelve plants had been propagated at the U.C. Botanical Garden at Berkeley. Seeds were again collected in the wild and from propagated plants in 2006 and 2007. 2006 seed yield from propagated plants included more than 40,000 seeds. 2007 seed yield from propagated plants included more than 145,000 seeds.

==== Restoration ====
The plant, an annual wildflower which dies after flowering and which is found at just one site, is still considered critically threatened. In December 2007 the Working Group seeded additional plots near the wild site.

=== 2016 rediscovery ===
It was reported in September 2016, that two botanists performing a wildflower survey in May 2016, at the Black Diamond Regional Preserve, a park near Mount Diablo, had unexpectedly found over a million Mount Diablo buckwheat specimens blooming on a hillside inside the preserve. Four organizations collaborated to withhold announcement of the discovery until the specimens had finished blooming and could produce seeds.
