= Rancho San Miguel =

Coordinates: 37°54′49″N 122°01′59″W

Rancho San Miguel is a neighborhood in Walnut Creek, California. It is named after the Alta California Rancho Rancho Arroyo de Las Nueces y Bolbones which was also referred to as Rancho San Miguel. Until the mid-1950s the area consisted largely of walnut orchards, until developer Joseph Eichler built a subdivision north of Shell Ridge and Ygnacio Valley Road.
