= Mountain View, Contra Costa County, California =

Mountain View
- Unincorporated Community; Census Designated Place
- Location in Contra Costa County and the state of California

- Location in the United States
- Coordinates: 38°00′32″N 122°07′03″W
- Country: United States
- State: California
- County: Contra Costa

Government
  - State senator: Tim Grayson (D)
  - Assemblymember: Anamarie Avila Farias (D)
  - U. S. rep.: Mark DeSaulnier (D)

Area
  - Total: 0.3 sq mi (0.78 km^{2})
  - Land: 0.3 sq mi (0.78 km^{2})
  - Water: 0 sq mi (0 km^{2}) 0%
- Elevation: 112 ft (34 m)

Population (2020)
  - Total: 2,622
  - Density: 8,700/sq mi (3,400/km^{2})
- Time zone: UTC-8 (Pacific)
  - Summer (DST): UTC-7 (PDT)
- ZIP code: 94553
- Area code: 510, 341
- FIPS code: 06-49651

Mountain View is a census designated place (CDP) in Contra Costa County, California, United States. The population was 2,622 at the 2020 census.

== Geography ==
According to the United States Census Bureau, the CDP has a total area of 0.3 square miles (0.75 km^{2}), all land.

== Demographics ==
Historical population
Census	Pop.	Note	%±
2000	2,468		—
2010	2,372		−3.9%
2020	2,622		10.5%
U.S. Decennial Census; 1860–1870 1880-1890; 1900 1910 1920; 1930 1940 1950; 1960 1970 1980; 1990 2000 2010

Mountain View first appeared as a census designated place in the 2000 U.S. census.

=== 2020 ===
Mountain View CDP, California – Racial and ethnic composition Note: the US Census treats Hispanic/Latino as an ethnic category. This table excludes Latinos from the racial categories and assigns them to a separate category. Hispanics/Latinos may be of any race.
Race / Ethnicity (NH = Non-Hispanic)	Pop 2000	Pop 2010	Pop 2020	% 2000	% 2010	% 2020
White alone (NH)	1,897	1,620	1,528	76.86%	68.30%	58.28%
Black or African American alone (NH)	47	48	65	1.90%	2.02%	2.48%
Native American or Alaska Native alone (NH)	24	13	22	0.97%	0.55%	0.84%
Asian alone (NH)	42	66	136	1.70%	2.78%	5.19%
Native Hawaiian or Pacific Islander alone (NH)	5	20	7	0.20%	0.84%	0.27%
Other race alone (NH)	2	5	21	0.08%	0.21%	0.80%
Mixed race or Multiracial (NH)	93	76	174	3.77%	3.20%	6.64%
Hispanic or Latino (any race)	358	524	669	14.51%	22.09%	25.51%
Total	2,468	2,372	2,622	100.00%	100.00%	100.00%

As of the 2020 census, there were 2,622 people living in 864 households in Mountain View. The population density was 8,740 inhabitants per square mile (3,370/km^{2}). The racial makeup of the CDP was 63.7% White, 2.7% African American, 1.4% Native American, 5.3% Asian, 0.3% Pacific Islander, 10.4% from other races, and 15.8% from two or more races. 25.5% of the population were Hispanic or Latino of any race.

In 2023, the US Census Bureau estimated that the median household income was $84,818, and the per capita income was $51,054. About 5.5% of families and 7.3% of the population were below the poverty line.

=== 2010 ===
The 2010 United States census reported that Mountain View had a population of 2,372. The population density was 8,182.2 inhabitants per square mile (3,159.2/km^{2}). The racial makeup of Mountain View was 1,896 (79.9%) White, 60 (2.5%) African American, 30 (1.3%) Native American, 70 (3.0%) Asian, 20 (0.8%) Pacific Islander, 155 (6.5%) from other races, and 141 (5.9%) from two or more races. Hispanic or Latino of any race were 524 persons (22.1%).

The Census reported that 2,344 people (98.8% of the population) lived in households, 28 (1.2%) lived in non-institutionalized group quarters, and 0 (0%) were institutionalized.

There were 939 households, out of which 295 (31.4%) had children under the age of 18 living in them, 369 (39.3%) were opposite-sex married couples living together, 138 (14.7%) had a female householder with no husband present, 71 (7.6%) had a male householder with no wife present. There were 89 (9.5%) unmarried opposite-sex partnerships, and 11 (1.2%) same-sex married couples or partnerships. 241 households (25.7%) were made up of individuals, and 44 (4.7%) had someone living alone who was 65 years of age or older. The average household size was 2.50. There were 578 families (61.6% of all households); the average family size was 2.99.

The age distribution was 480 people (20.2%) under the age of 18, 253 people (10.7%) aged 18 to 24, 708 people (29.8%) aged 25 to 44, 749 people (31.6%) aged 45 to 64, and 182 people (7.7%) who were 65 years of age or older. The median age was 36.5 years. For every 100 females, there were 99.8 males. For every 100 females age 18 and over, there were 102.1 males.

There were 1,013 housing units at an average density of 3,494.3 units per square mile (1,349.2 units/km^{2}), of which 939 were occupied, of which 572 (60.9%) were owner-occupied, and 367 (39.1%) were occupied by renters. The homeowner vacancy rate was 3.9%; the rental vacancy rate was 6.6%. 1,446 people (61.0% of the population) lived in owner-occupied housing units and 898 people (37.9%) lived in rental housing units.
