= Norris Canyon, California =

Norris Canyon
- Census-designated place
- Position in California.
- Coordinates: 37°44′46″N 121°59′20″W
- Country: United States
- State: California
- County: Contra Costa

Area
  - Total: 3.61 sq mi (9.35 km^{2})
  - Land: 3.61 sq mi (9.35 km^{2})
  - Water: 0 sq mi (0 km^{2}) 0%
- Elevation: 1,063 ft (324 m)

Population (2020)
  - Total: 1,313
  - Density: 364/sq mi (140/km^{2})
- Time zone: UTC-8 (Pacific (PST))
  - Summer (DST): UTC-7 (PDT)
- GNIS feature ID: 2583094

Norris Canyon is a census-designated place in Contra Costa County, California,United States. Norris Canyon sits at an elevation of 1063 feet (324 m). The 2020 United States census reported Norris Canyon's population as 1,313.

== Geography ==
According to the United States Census Bureau, the CDP has a total area of 3.61 square miles (9.35 km^{2}), all land.

== Demographics ==
Historical population
Census	Pop.	Note	%±
2010	957		—
2020	1,313		37.2%
U.S. Decennial Census; 2010

Norris Canyon first appeared as a census designated place in the 2010 U.S. census.

=== 2020 census ===
As of the 2020 census, Norris Canyon had a population of 1,313. The population density was 363.7 inhabitants per square mile (140.4/km^{2}). The median age was 42.8 years. The age distribution was 27.3% under the age of 18, 9.6% aged 18 to 24, 15.7% aged 25 to 44, 36.7% aged 45 to 64, and 10.7% who were 65 years of age or older. For every 100 females, there were 105.8 males, and for every 100 females age 18 and over, there were 102.3 males age 18 and over.

The census reported that 100% of the population lived in households. There were 360 households, of which 55.3% had children under the age of 18 living in them. Of all households, 88.1% were married-couple households, 0.8% were cohabiting couple households, 4.7% were households with a male householder and no spouse or partner present, and 6.4% were households with a female householder and no spouse or partner present. About 2.8% of all households were made up of individuals and 0.9% had someone living alone who was 65 years of age or older. The average household size was 3.65. There were 343 families (95.3% of all households).

There were 385 housing units at an average density of 106.6 units per square mile (41.2 units/km^{2}), of which 360 (93.5%) were occupied and 6.5% were vacant. Of occupied units, 95.0% were owner-occupied and 5.0% were occupied by renters. The homeowner vacancy rate was 0.3% and the rental vacancy rate was 12.0%.

0.0% of residents lived in urban areas, while 100.0% lived in rural areas.

Racial composition as of the 2020 census
Race	Number	Percent
White	319	24.3%
Black or African American	25	1.9%
American Indian and Alaska Native	5	0.4%
Asian	880	67.0%
Native Hawaiian and Other Pacific Islander	0	0.0%
Some other race	21	1.6%
Two or more races	63	4.8%
Hispanic or Latino (of any race)	43	3.3%

== Education ==
The CDP is served by San Ramon Valley Unified School District.
