= Camino Tassajara, California =

Camino Tassajara
- Census-designated place
- Position in California.
- Coordinates: 37°47′24″N 121°53′08″W
- Country: United States
- State: California
- County: Contra Costa

Area
  - Total: 1.28 sq mi (3.31 km^{2})
  - Land: 1.28 sq mi (3.31 km^{2})
  - Water: 0 sq mi (0.00 km^{2}) 0%
- Elevation: 814 ft (248 m)

Population (2020)
  - Total: 4,951
  - Density: 3,879.8/sq mi (1,498.01/km^{2})
- Time zone: UTC-8 (Pacific (PST))
  - Summer (DST): UTC-7 (PDT)
- ZIP code: 94506
- Area code: 925
- FIPS code: 06-10301
- GNIS feature IDs: 2583160, 2633171

Camino Tassajara (Spanish for "Path of Carne Seca") is a census-designated place in Contra Costa County, California, United States. Camino Tassajara sits at an elevation of 814 feet (248 m). The 2020 United States census reported Camino Tassajara's population was 4,951.

== Geography ==
According to the United States Census Bureau, the CDP has a total area of 1.261 square miles (3.265 km^{2}), all land.

== Demographics ==
Historical population
Census	Pop.	Note	%±
2010	2,197		—
2020	4,951		125.4%
U.S. Decennial Census; 2010 2020

=== Racial and ethnic composition ===
Camino Tassajara CDP, California – Racial and ethnic composition Note: the US Census treats Hispanic/Latino as an ethnic category. This table excludes Latinos from the racial categories and assigns them to a separate category. Hispanics/Latinos may be of any race.
Race / Ethnicity (NH = Non-Hispanic)	Pop 2010	Pop 2020	% 2010	% 2020
White alone (NH)	791	1,386	36.00%	27.99%
Black or African American alone (NH)	51	103	2.32%	2.08%
Native American or Alaska Native alone (NH)	1	6	0.05%	0.12%
Asian alone (NH)	1,111	2,845	50.57%	57.46%
Pacific Islander alone (NH)	1	3	0.05%	0.06%
Other Race alone (NH)	4	41	0.18%	0.83%
Mixed Race or Multi-Racial (NH)	100	285	4.55%	5.76%
Hispanic or Latino (any race)	138	282	6.28%	5.70%
Total	2,197	4,951	0.00%	0.00%

=== 2020 census ===
As of the 2020 census, Camino Tassajara had a population of 4,951. The population density was 3,880.1 inhabitants per square mile (1,498.1/km^{2}). The median age was 40.8 years. 32.6% of residents were under the age of 18 and 10.1% were 65 years of age or older.

For every 100 females, there were 93.9 males. For every 100 females age 18 and over, there were 88.1 males age 18 and over. 100.0% of residents lived in urban areas, while 0.0% lived in rural areas.

The whole population lived in households. There were 1,439 households, out of which 61.6% included children under the age of 18. Of all households, 77.3% were married-couple households, 1.9% were cohabiting couple households, 14.5% had a female householder with no partner present, and 6.2% had a male householder with no partner present. About 9.9% of households were one person, and 4.8% were one person aged 65 or older. The average household size was 3.44. There were 1,269 families (88.2% of all households).

There were 1,491 housing units at an average density of 1,168.5 units per square mile (451.2 units/km^{2}); 96.5% were occupied and 3.5% were vacant. Of occupied units, 81.4% were owner-occupied and 18.6% were occupied by renters. The homeowner vacancy rate was 0.3% and the rental vacancy rate was 7.3%.

=== 2010 census ===
Camino Tassajara first appeared as a census designated place in the 2010 U.S. census. It contains no area from the Blackhawk-Camino Tassajara CDP (since renamed Blackhawk CDP).

== Education ==
The CDP is served by San Ramon Valley Unified School District.
