= Rancho Arroyo de Las Nueces y Bolbones =

Mexican land grant in Contra Costa County, California

Coordinates: 37.920°N 122.020°W

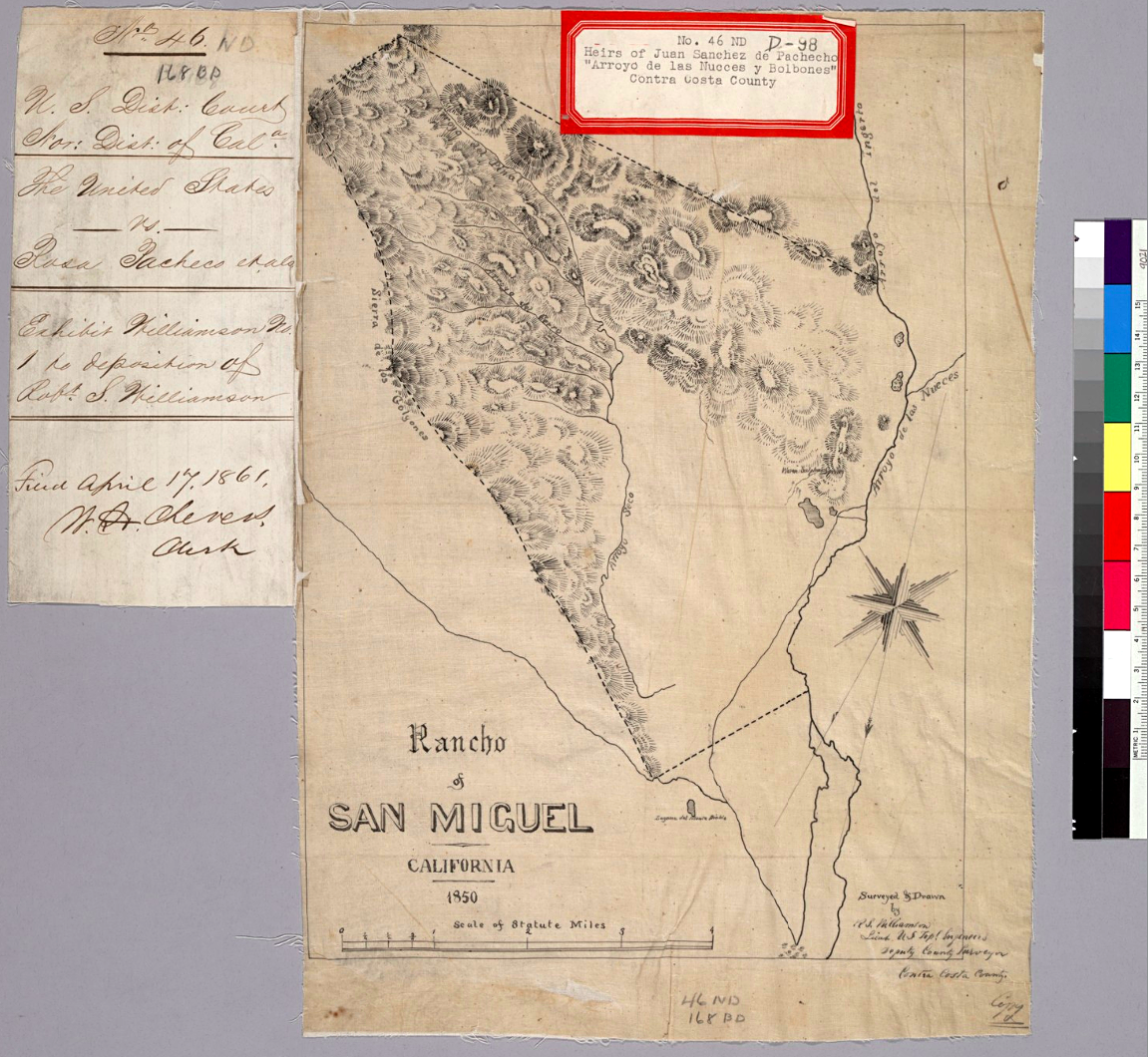
1850 map of the rancho (Mt. Diablo at upper left, with north at lower left)

Rancho Arroyo de Las Nueces y Bolbones (also called "San Miguel") was a 17,782-acre (71.96 km^{2}) Mexican land grant in present-day Contra Costa County, California given in 1834 by Governor José Figueroa to Juana Sanchez de Pacheco.

The grant was named after the principal waterway, Arroyo de las Nueces (Walnut Creek), and for the local group of indigenous Americans (known as Bolbones in Spanish, also known as Volvon). The grant was on the western slope of Mount Diablo and includes the area of the present-day city of Walnut Creek. Approximately a quarter of the original rancho has been protected since the early 20th century within the boundaries of Mt. Diablo State Park.

== History ==
Juana Lorenza Sanchez de Pacheco (1776–1853) was the widow of Miguel Antonio Pacheco (1745–1829), a soldier. He was the son of Juan Salvio Pacheco (1729–1777) and Maria Carmen del Valle, who came to San Francisco in 1776 with the De Anza Expedition. He was a cousin of Salvio Pacheco, founder of Concord, California. The Pacheco family used its land for grazing cattle, but did not settle on the rancho.

With the cession of California to the United States following its victory in the Mexican-American War, the 1848 Treaty of Guadalupe Hidalgo provided that the historic Spanish and Mexican land grants would be honored. As required by the Land Act of 1851, descendants of the Pacheco family filed a claim for Rancho Arroyo de Las Nueces y Bolbones with the Public Land Commission in 1852, and the grant was patented in 1866 to the heirs of Juana Lorenza Sanchez de Pacheco. The grant was for two leagues (approx. 8857 acres; see Spanish customary units), but was confirmed for nearly four leagues (approx. 17,714 acres or 28 square miles).

Rosa Maria Pacheco, daughter of Miguel Antonio Pacheco, married Jose Maria Sibrian (1798 - ). Their two sons, Jose Ysidro Sibrian (1821 - ) and Jose Ygnacio Sibrian (1822 - ), inherited the rancho. Ygnacio Sibrian built the first roofed residence in the valley around 1850 and was the namesake of the Ygnacio Valley. Shortly before American pioneer John Marsh of Rancho Los Meganos died in 1856, he and Ygnacio Sibrian were involved in a bitter court trial.

== Historic sites of the Rancho ==
- Old Borges Ranch. The former ranch of American pioneer Frank Borges, who was associated with Walnut Creek.
- Shadelands Ranch. Developed by Hiram Penniman, an American who arrived in California in 1853. In 1856 he purchased 500 acres (2.0 km^{2}) of land from Encarnación Pacheco, daughter of Juana Sanchez de Pacheco. Shadelands Ranch House is listed on the National Register of Historic Places for Contra Costa County.
