= Mary Bowerman =

American botanist (1908–2005)

Mary Leolin Bowerman (January 25, 1908 – August 21, 2005) was an American botanist, co-author of The Flowering Plants and Ferns of Mount Diablo, California; Their Distribution and Association into Plant Communities, and the co-founder of Save Mount Diablo. She helped to preserve tens of thousands of acres of Mount Diablo in the San Francisco East Bay before dying at age 97. In 1936 she was the last person to record the Mount Diablo buckwheat Eriogonum truncatum, until it was rediscovered nearly seventy years later on May 10, 2005. In 1978 the manzanita Arctostaphylos bowermaniae was named in her honor.

== Life and work ==
Mary Leolin "Leo" Bowerman, the daughter of Lindley H. Bowerman and Ada Sarah Wesson Bowerman, co-founded the activist group Save Mount Diablo in 1971 and served on its board of directors until her death. Born in Toronto, Ontario, Canada, and educated in England, Bowerman eventually became a resident of Pasadena, California during her teenage years. From 1928 to 1954, Berkeley, California was her home. She ultimately settled in Lafayette, California.

A botanist and student of the flora of Mount Diablo for over seventy-five years, she received her undergraduate degree in 1930 and her Ph.D. in 1936 from U.C. Berkeley. Her doctoral advisor was famed California botanist Willis Linn Jepson; she was his last surviving student. It was as a student that she began a project on Mt. Diablo. She later said, "Little did I know 65 years ago that my senior project would become my life's work."

Beginning in 1930, her botanical research pre-dated the creation of Mt. Diablo State Park and became a basis for preservation there. She expanded her 1936 doctorate into The Flowering Plants and Ferns of Mount Diablo, California; Their Distribution and Association into Plant Communities, The Gillick Press, 1944. In 2002 the book was updated and republished by Bowerman and Barbara Ertter, Curator of Western North American Flora at the U.C. Berkeley's Jepson Herbarium. Her other area of expertise was the flora of southern British Columbia.

Through "Save Mount Diablo," she worked toward her dream: "that the whole of Mount Diablo, including its foothills, should remain open space...that the visual and natural integrity will be sustained." Bowerman was involved in the expansion of public lands on Mt. Diablo from 6,788 acres (27 km²) in 1971 to more than 87,000 acres (350 km²) in 2005, including the tripling in size of Mt. Diablo State Park to 20,000 acres (80 km²). At Mt. Diablo she was directly involved in preservation of Blackhawk Ridge, the Blackhills; Sycamore, Mitchell, Back, and Donner Canyons; and North Peak.

== Honors ==
Mt. Diablo State Park's summit Fire Interpretive Trail was dedicated in her honor in 1982 and renamed for her in 2007. She was further honored by East Bay Regional Park District in 2001 when the crest of Highland Ridge, in Morgan Territory Regional Preserve, was renamed Founders Ridge in honor of Save Mount Diablo's founders. In 1978 James B. Roof, director of the East Bay Regional Park District's Botanic Garden named in her honor the manzanita Arctostaphylos bowermaniae, a variant found at Black Diamond Mines Regional Preserve near Antioch, California.

She received many awards for her Diablo preservation efforts including a State of California Golden Bear award, John Muir Memorial Association's John Muir Conservation Award (1980), the Chevron Times Mirror Magazine National Conservation Award (1996), Contra Costa County Women of Achievement Hall of Fame Award (1998), Diablo Magazine's Threads of Hope Volunteer Award for Lifetime Achievement (2000), and the Daughters of the American Revolution's National Conservation Medal. She was the subject of interviews, news articles, and editorials including in photographer Galen Rowell's book Bay Area Wild, 1997. She was recognized in the Sept. 9, 1998 Congressional Record.
