= East Bay =

Eastern region of the San Francisco Bay Area, California, US

Coordinates: 37.7°N 122°W

- Region
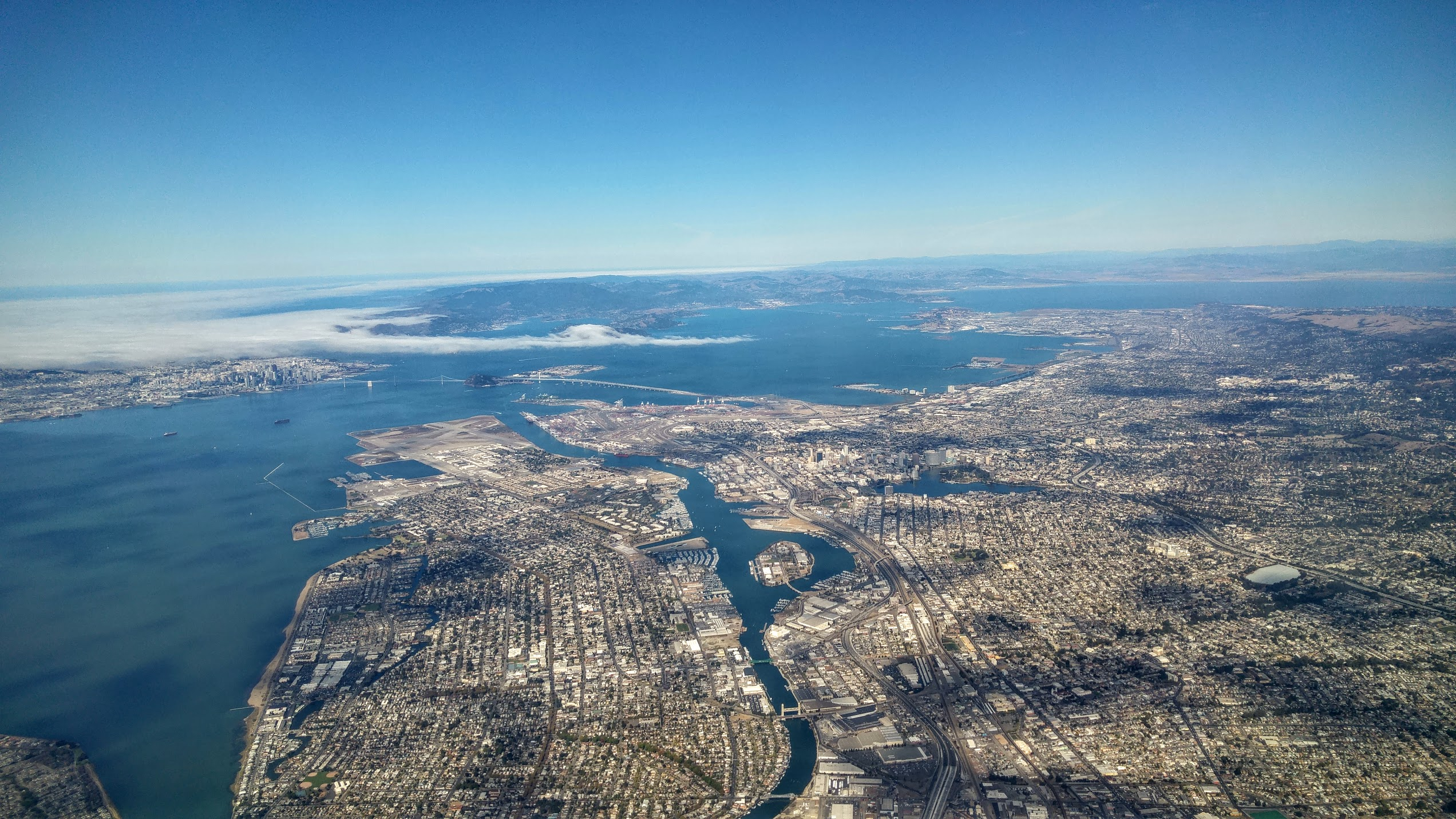
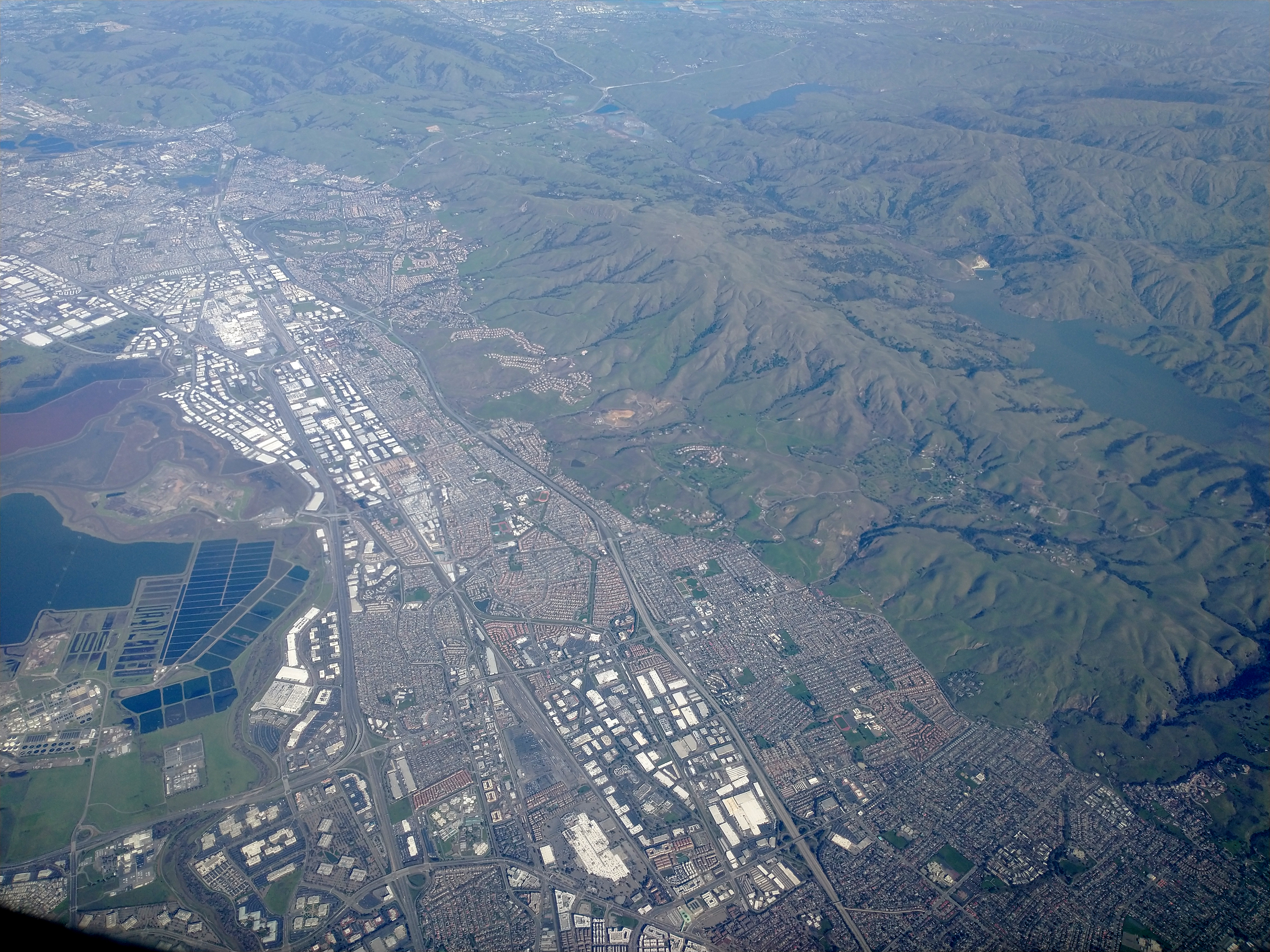
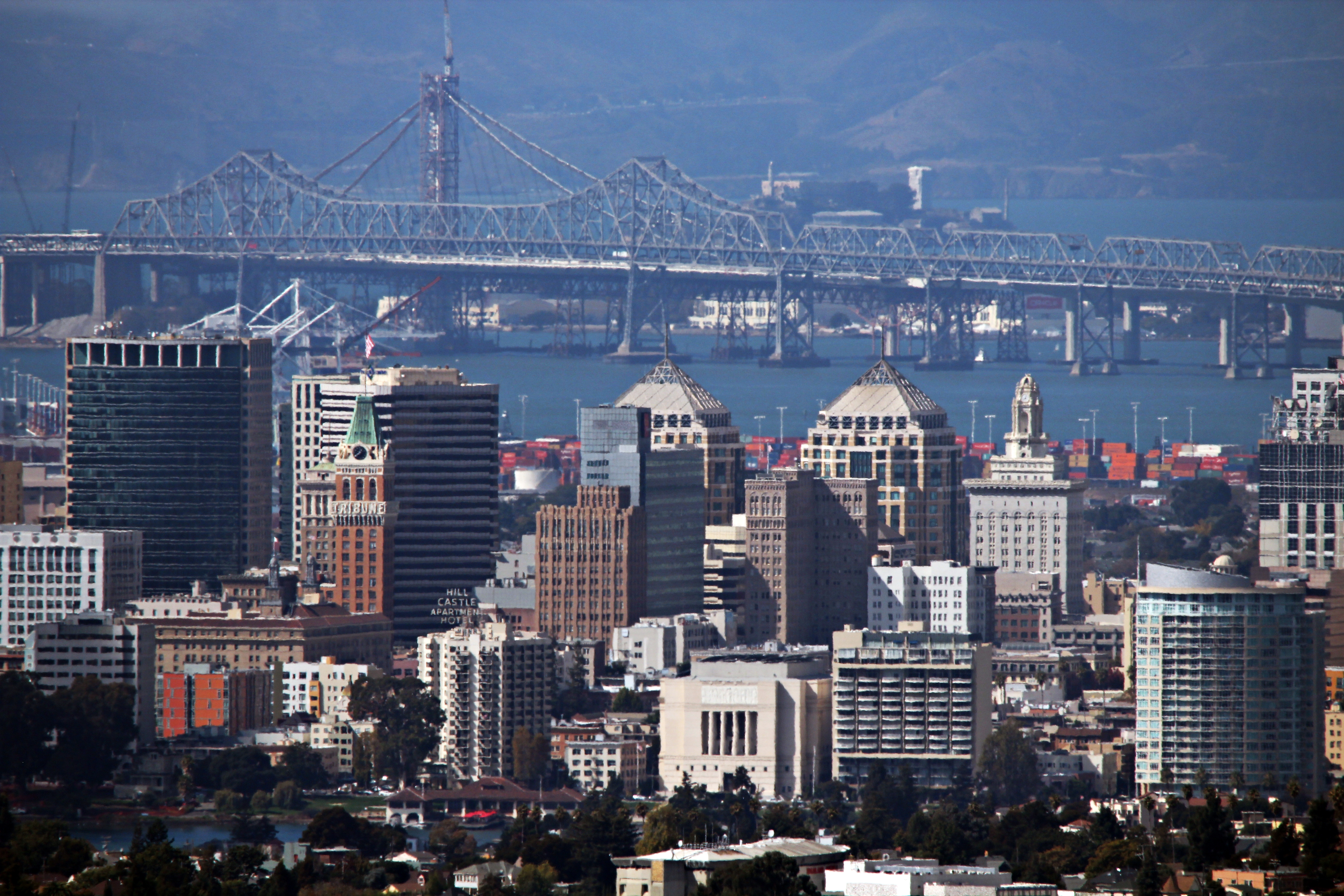
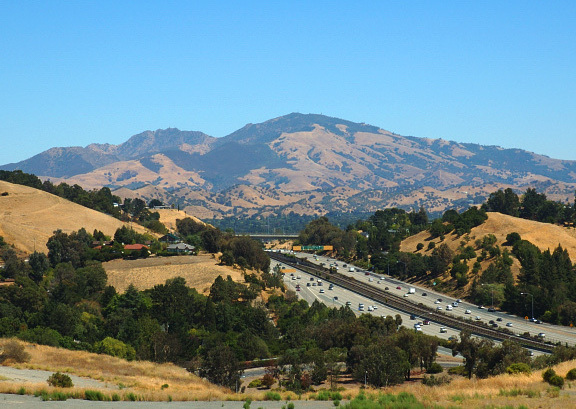
- The East Bay in 2015, with the Bay Bridge connecting from Oakland to Treasure Island and San Francisco Fremont and Milpitas Oakland Mount Diablo

- Map of incorporated and unincorporated areas in East Bay, California
- Country: United States
- State: California
- Part of: San Francisco Bay Area
- Principal city: Oakland
- Other municipalities: List: Fremont; Hayward; Concord; Berkeley; Antioch; Richmond
- Area codes: 510/341, 925

The East Bay is the eastern region of the San Francisco Bay Area and includes cities along the eastern shores of San Francisco Bay and San Pablo Bay. The region has grown to include inland communities in Alameda and Contra Costa counties. With a population of roughly 2.8 million in 2024, it is the most populous subregion in the Bay Area, containing the second- and third-most populous Bay Area counties of Alameda (1.7 million) and Contra Costa (1.1 million).

Oakland is the largest city in the East Bay by population and the third largest in the Bay Area. The city serves as a major transportation hub for the U.S. West Coast, and its port is the largest in Northern California. The University of California, Berkeley and the headquarters of the University of California is in the East Bay. Increased population has led to the growth of large edge cities such as Alameda, Concord, El Cerrito, Emeryville, Fremont, Hayward, Livermore, Pleasanton, Richmond, San Leandro, San Ramon, and Walnut Creek. The cities are generally served by Bay Area Rapid Transit and the Oakland San Francisco Bay Airport.

== History and development ==
Although initial development in the greater Bay Area focused on San Francisco, the coastal East Bay came to prominence in the middle of the 19th century as the part of the Bay Area most accessible by land from the east. The transcontinental railroad was completed in 1869 with its western terminus at the newly constructed Oakland Long Wharf, and the new city of Oakland rapidly developed into a significant seaport. Today the Port of Oakland is the Bay Area's largest port and the fifth largest container shipping port in the United States. In 1868, the University of California was formed from the private College of California and a new campus was built in what would become Berkeley. The 1906 San Francisco earthquake saw a large number of refugees flee to the relatively undamaged East Bay, and the region continued to grow rapidly. As the East Bay grew, the push to connect it with a more permanent link than ferry service resulted in the completion of the San Francisco–Oakland Bay Bridge in 1936.

The Bay Area saw further growth in the decades following World War II, with the population doubling between 1940 and 1960, and doubling again by 2000. The 1937 completion of the Caldecott Tunnel through the Berkeley Hills fueled growth further east, where there was undeveloped land. Cities in the Diablo Valley, including Concord and Walnut Creek, saw their populations increase tenfold or more between 1950 and 1970. The addition of the BART commuter rail system in 1972 further encouraged development in increasingly far-flung regions of the East Bay. Today, the valleys east of the Berkeley Hills contain large affluent suburban communities such as Walnut Creek, San Ramon and Pleasanton.

The East Bay is not a formally defined region, aside from its being described as a region inclusive of Alameda and Contra Costa counties. As development moves generally eastward, new areas are described as being part of the East Bay. In 1996, BART was extended from its terminus in Concord to a new station in Pittsburg, symbolically incorporating the newly expanded Delta communities of Pittsburg and Antioch as extended regions of the East Bay. Beyond the borders of Alameda County, the large population of Tracy is connected as a bedroom community housing commuters traveling to or through the East Bay.

== Cities ==
Except for some hills and ridges which exist as parklands or undeveloped land, and some farmland in eastern Contra Costa and Alameda Counties, the East Bay is highly urbanized. The East Bay shoreline is an urban corridor with several cities exceeding 100,000 residents, including the cities of Oakland, Hayward, Fremont, Richmond, and Berkeley. In the inland valleys on the east side of the Berkeley Hills, the land is mostly developed, particularly on the eastern fringe of Contra Costa county and the Tri-Valley area. In the inland valleys, the population density is less and the cities smaller. Cities exceeding 100,000 residents in the inland valleys include Antioch and Concord.

East Bay cities include:

- Acalanes Ridge (Note: Unincorporated Community)
- Alameda
- Alamo
- Albany
- Alhambra Valley
- Antioch
- Ashland
- Bay Point
- Bayview
- Berkeley
- Bethel Island
- Blackhawk
- Brentwood
- Byron
- Camino Tassajara
- Canyon
- Castle Hill
- Castro Valley
- Cherryland
- Clayton
- Clyde
- Concord
- Contra Costa Centre
- Crockett
- Danville
- Diablo
- Discovery Bay
- Dublin
- East Richmond Heights
- El Cerrito
- El Sobrante
- Emeryville
- Fairview
- Fremont
- Hayward
- Hercules
- Kensington
- Knightsen
- Lafayette
- Livermore
- Martinez
- Montalvin Manor
- Moraga
- Newark
- Norris Canyon
- North Gate
- North Richmond
- Oakland
- Oakley
- Orinda
- Pacheco
- Piedmont
- Pittsburg
- Pinole
- Pleasant Hill
- Pleasanton
- Port Costa
- Reliez Valley
- Richmond
- Rodeo
- Rollingwood
- San Leandro
- San Lorenzo
- San Miguel
- San Pablo
- San Ramon
- Saranap
- Shell Ridge
- Sunol
- Tara Hills
- Union City
- Vine Hill
- Walnut Creek

== Culture ==
The East Bay has a free weekly newspaper, the East Bay Express, which has reported on the culture and politics of the East Bay for over 30 years, and has influenced the identification of the East Bay as a culturally defined region of the Bay Area. The East Bay Monthly, another free newspaper, has been published since 1970. In the early years of the evolution of USA Today, during the early 1980s, they operated regional newspapers, with the region's paper entitled East Bay Today.

The Solano Avenue Stroll, the oldest and largest street festival in the greater San Francisco Bay Area, is held every September on the Solano Avenue shopping district in Albany and Berkeley.

The East Bay is the birthplace of many musical acts, including Creedence Clearwater Revival, Country Joe and the Fish, Counting Crows, Yesterday and Today, Digital Underground, Green Day, Operation Ivy, Primus, Rancid, Set Your Goals, Tower of Power (whose debut album is titled East Bay Grease), The Pointer Sisters, MC Hammer, Tony! Toni! Toné!, Too Short, Spice 1, en Vogue, Pete Escovedo and Sheila E, Keyshia Cole, and Mac Dre. The region is a major center for the development of rock, folk, funk, jazz, hip hop, soul and women's music.

Bay Area thrash metal has centered strongly on the East Bay, including the bands Exodus and Metallica, among others. Possessed and Death, both considered the first death metal bands, have roots or connections in the East Bay: Possessed formed in El Sobrante, with Death debuting nationally while in Concord.

Major music (and sports) venues include the Oakland Arena; adjacent Oakland Coliseum; the Oakland Paramount Theater, venue for the Oakland East Bay Symphony; the Fox Oakland Theatre, the UC Berkeley Greek Theater, the nonprofit The Freight and Salvage, and the Concord Pavilion (formerly Sleep Train Pavilion).

Major museums include the Oakland Museum of California, the Lawrence Hall of Science and the Chabot Space and Science Center.

The East Bay Regional Parks District operates over fifty parks, many consisting of significant acreage of wildlands, in the East Bay, many directly adjacent to urban centers. Tilden Regional Park, is one of the largest regional parks (2,000 acres (8.1 km^{2})) located directly adjacent to the urban center of Berkeley. Briones Regional Park, at 5,000 acres, is another large wildlands park near an urban center, Walnut Creek.

The East Bay also has a rich political history. One of the revolutionary movements founded in Oakland was the Black Panther Party.

The East Bay is home to many of the restaurants central to the creation of California cuisine, including Chez Panisse.

== Transportation ==
All vehicular crossings of the San Francisco Bay land in the counties comprising the East Bay. Interstate highways in the East Bay include Interstates 80, 580, 680, 880, 980, and 238. California State Routes 24, 4, 13, 92, 160, 242, 84, and Richmond Parkway are limited access highways for at least part of their lengths in the area. State Route 61, State Route 84, State Route 123, State Route 185, and State Route 238 are major surface streets that receive state funding for maintenance. San Pablo Avenue previously carried U.S. Route 40 until the terminus was moved progressively east to Utah.

AC Transit is the major bus transit agency for the region, and provides bus service throughout Alameda and Contra Costa counties, hence the "AC" moniker. County Connection, WestCAT, WHEELS, Tri Delta Transit and Union City Transit also provide bus service in the East Bay.

Ferry service is provided by San Francisco Bay Ferry from Jack London Square and Alameda Harbor, with service at Richmond Ferry Terminal slated to begin in 2018. Hercules may also see future ferry service to San Francisco.

Bicycle transportation is strongly promoted by city and county agencies, and by organizations like the East Bay Bicycle Coalition.

Major pedestrian paths across the region include the San Francisco Bay Trail, the Bay Area Ridge Trail, the Ohlone Greenway, Iron Horse Regional Trail, Contra Costa Canal Trail, and the Richmond Greenway.

=== Rail ===
Rail service in the East Bay dates to the First transcontinental railroad, when the Western Pacific Railroad was contracted by the Central Pacific Railroad to provide the link between the Bay and Sacramento. This railroad eventually became the Niles Canyon Railway. Service to Alameda commenced in September 1869, four months after driving the golden spike at Promintory, Utah. Oakland Long Wharf eventually became the western terminus before ferry service to San Francisco. This road provided the sole link to the rest of the country until about 1879 when a more direct route across the Carquinez Strait was completed. Today, Altamont Corridor Express (ACE) operates commuter rail services through Niles Canyon to San Jose.

Streetcar service across the East Bay was historically provided by the Key System, incorporated in 1902 as the San Francisco, Oakland, and San Jose Railway. An amalgamation of several streetcar companies established in the late part of the century, the Key System provided interurban routes across Alameda county, with connections to San Francisco ferries via their private Key System Pier. Southern Pacific ran a competing system, East Bay Electric Lines, until they, too, had the Key System take over operations. When the San Francisco–Oakland Bay Bridge opened in 1936, Key System cars could make the trip directly to the Transbay Terminal across the lower deck. Streetcars were replaced with busses in 1948 and transbay service halted in 1958. The system's assets were sold to the newly formed AC Transit in 1960.

The East Bay's modern rail transit service is Bay Area Rapid Transit, or BART, which was primarily designed to deliver commuters to San Francisco via the Transbay Tube, and to a lesser extent Oakland and Berkeley.

Amtrak's California Zephyr terminates in Emeryville, providing connections as far as Chicago, and further stations across the East Bay are served by Amtrak California's Coast Starlight and Gold Runner.

== Economy ==
The East Bay has a mixed economy of services, manufacturing, and small and large businesses. The region is headquarters to a number of highly notable businesses, including Kaiser Permanente, Chevron, and Safeway, among others. The East Bay Economic Development Alliance was founded by Alameda County as the Economic Development Advisory Board in 1990 as a public/private partnership with the mission to promote the East Bay as an important region for development, with Contra Costa County joining in 1996, and the current name chosen in 2006.

== Major employers ==
The East Bay, as a part of the greater Bay Area, is a highly developed region, and is a major center for new and established economic ventures. Along with the county governments of Alameda and Contra Costa, the largest employers are:

1. University of California, Berkeley with approximately 20,000 employees
2. AT&T with approximately 11,000 employees
3. The U.S. Postal Service with approximately 10,000 employees
4. Tesla with approximately 10,000 employees
5. Lawrence Livermore National Laboratory with approximately 8,750 employees
6. Chevron Corp. (world headquarters in San Ramon) with 8,730 employees
7. Safeway (world headquarters in Pleasanton) with 7,922 employees
8. Bank of America with 7,081 employees
9. PG&E with approximately 5,200 employees
10. Kaiser Permanente (US headquarters in Oakland) with 4,730 employees
11. Lucky Stores with 4,631 employees
12. Bio-Rad Laboratories with 4,300 employees
13. Wells Fargo with about 4,000 employees
14. Workday (world headquarters in Pleasanton) with 3,865 employees
15. Lawrence Berkeley National Laboratory with 3,816 employees
16. Mount Diablo Unified School District with 3,700 employees
17. West Contra Costa Unified School District with 3,360 employees
18. Alta Bates Summit Medical Center with 3,100 employees
19. John Muir Medical Center with 3,023 employees
20. Sandia National Laboratories with 1,670 employees
21. Oracle with 1,500 employees
22. Western Digital with 1,300 employees
23. Seagate with 1,050 employees

Other major companies with headquarters in the East Bay include 10x Genomics, 24 Hour Fitness, Alibris, ANG Newspapers, Clif Bar, Clorox, Columbus Salame, Dreyer's, Ellie Mae, GE Digital, Ghirardelli Chocolate Company, Gillig Corporation, LeapFrog, Peet's Coffee, Pixar Animation Studios, Ross Stores and Workday. Mervyn's headquarters were located in the East Bay until they declared bankruptcy. The New United Motor Manufacturing, Inc. (NUMMI) automobile manufacturing plant employed about 5,100 employees at its peak. Tesla, Inc. has taken over part of the NUMMI plant, which is still the only automobile manufacturing plant in California.

== Higher education ==
The East Bay is served by a number of both public and private higher education institutions:

Colleges

- Two-year (community colleges)
  - Berkeley City College
  - Chabot College
  - College of Alameda
  - Contra Costa College
  - Diablo Valley College
  - Laney College
  - Las Positas College
  - Los Medanos College
  - Merritt College
  - Ohlone College

Universities

- Public
  - California State University, East Bay (CSU East Bay)
  - University of California, Berkeley (UC Berkeley)
- Private
  - California College of the Arts
  - Holy Names University (defunct)
  - John F. Kennedy University (defunct)
  - Life Chiropractic College West
  - Mills College at Northeastern University
  - Patten University
  - Saint Mary's College of California
  - Samuel Merritt University

== See also ==
- East Bay Housing Organizations
- Transportation in the San Francisco Bay Area
