= Pleasant Hill School =

Pleasant Hill School may refer to:

In Canada

- Pleasant Hill, Saskatoon#Education

In the United States

- College Park High School (Pleasant Hill, California) — a high school in Mount Diablo Unified School District and in Pleasant Hill, Contra Costa County, California, with "Falcons" as a team name
- Pleasant Hill Elementary School (Pleasant Hill, California) — a grade school in Mount Diablo Unified School District and in Pleasant Hill, Contra Costa County, California
- Pleasant Hill High School (Pleasant Hill, California) — a former high school in Mount Diablo Unified School District and in Pleasant Hill, Contra Costa County, California, with "Rams" as a team name. Closed in 1980.
- Pleasant Hill Intermediate School (Pleasant Hill, California) — a former intermediate school in Mount Diablo Unified School District and in Pleasant Hill, Contra Costa County, California, with "Trojans" as a team name. The school was changed to an Academics Plus Program in 1978 and renamed Sequoia Middle School (Pleasant Hill, California).
- Pleasant Hill Middle School (Pleasant Hill, California) — a middle school in Mount Diablo Unified School District and in Pleasant Hill, Contra Costa County, California, with "Rams" as a team name. The school is located in the old Pleasant Hill High School campus.
- Pleasant Hill School — previous name of Pleasant Hill Elementary School (Pleasant Hill, California) from 1866 until around 1949.
- Pleasant Hill School — a grade school in Palatine Community Consolidated School District 15, Palatine, Cook County, Illinois
- Pleasant Hill School District 69 — a single-school elementary district in Peoria County, Illinois
- Pleasant Hill High School (Illinois) — the high school of Pleasant Hill Community Unit School District 3, Pleasant Hill, Pike County, Illinois, with "Wolves" as the team name
- Pleasant Hill School (Lineville, Iowa), listed on the National Register of Historic Places in Wayne County, Iowa.
- Pleasant Hill High School (Louisiana) — a high school of the Sabine Parish School Board, Sabine Parish, Louisiana, with "Eagles" as a team name
- Any of the schools of Pleasant Hill R-III School District in Pleasant Hill, Missouri
  - Pleasant Hill High School (Missouri) — the high school of that district, with "Roosters" and "Chicks" as team names
- Either of the schools of Pleasant Hill School District (Oregon) in Pleasant Hill, Oregon
  - Pleasant Hill High School (Oregon) — the high school of that district, with "Billies" as the team name
