= Saranap, California =

- Census-designated place
- Location in California
- Coordinates: 37°53′06″N 122°04′34″W
- Country: United States
- State: California
- County: Contra Costa

Area
  - Total: 1.135 sq mi (2.939 km^{2})
  - Land: 1.135 sq mi (2.939 km^{2})
  - Water: 0 sq mi (0 km^{2}) 0%
- Elevation: 180 ft (55 m)

Population (2020)
  - Total: 5,830
  - Density: 5,140/sq mi (1,980/km^{2})

Saranap (until 1913, Dewing Park) is a residential census-designated place (CDP) within central Contra Costa County, California, United States. Lying at an elevation of 180 feet (55 m), it is bounded on the south and east by portions of Walnut Creek (including the gated senior residential development Rossmoor) and on the north and west by Lafayette. Saranap's ZIP code is 94595, but is addressed "Walnut Creek, CA" for delivery purposes as this is the postal designated city name used by residents. The community is in telephone area code 925. Saranap's population as of the 2020 census was 5,830.

Saranap has had numerous opportunities to be annexed as either part of Lafayette, or of Walnut Creek. These have been largely resisted by the occupants, whose land use is governed by county rules. These include the ability to keep small aviaries and bees, which can be highly restricted by law in surrounding cities, and in newer neighborhoods by restrictive covenants. As the local school district is independent of these city boundaries, and some of the cities impose additional parcel taxes, residents have little incentive to change the status quo. Only a minor addition was made to Lafayette from Saranap in recent decades, adding only one more street and being largely motivated by marginally superior housing values associated with the city of Lafayette.

== Etymology ==
The community's name comes from the Sacramento Northern Railway, an early 20th-century electric interurban railway. The local station, located near the intersection of Tice Valley Boulevard and Olympic Way, was named after the railroad developer's mother, Sara Napthaly. This developer promoted the railroad to enhance the value of land developments, a process that led to a development pattern similar to a trolley car suburb.

== Geography ==
According to the United States Census Bureau, the CDP has a total area of 1.135 square miles (3 km^{2}), all land.

== Demographics ==
Historical population
Census	Pop.	Note	%±
2010	5,202		—
2020	5,830		12.1%
U.S. Decennial Census; 2010

Saranap first appeared as a census designated place in the 2010 U.S. census.

=== 2020 census ===
As of the 2020 census, Saranap had a population of 5,830 and a population density of 5,136.6 inhabitants per square mile (1,983.3/km^{2}). The median age was 43.1 years. 21.6% of residents were under the age of 18 and 18.8% were 65 years of age or older. For every 100 females, there were 93.1 males, and for every 100 females age 18 and over, there were 91.9 males age 18 and over.

100.0% of residents lived in urban areas, while 0.0% lived in rural areas.

The census reported that 97.0% of the population lived in households, 2.3% lived in non-institutionalized group quarters, and 0.7% were institutionalized. There were 2,250 households, of which 32.4% had children under the age of 18 living in them. Of all households, 55.6% were married-couple households, 14.8% were households with a male householder and no spouse or partner present, and 24.8% were households with a female householder and no spouse or partner present. About 26.4% of all households were made up of individuals and 11.5% had someone living alone who was 65 years of age or older. The average household size was 2.51, and there were 1,509 families (67.1% of all households).

There were 2,335 housing units, of which 3.6% were vacant. The homeowner vacancy rate was 0.5% and the rental vacancy rate was 3.3%. Of occupied housing units, 69.0% were owner-occupied and 31.0% were occupied by renters.

Racial composition as of the 2020 census
Race	Number	Percent
White	4,159	71.3%
Black or African American	89	1.5%
American Indian and Alaska Native	21	0.4%
Asian	646	11.1%
Native Hawaiian and Other Pacific Islander	8	0.1%
Some other race	168	2.9%
Two or more races	739	12.7%
Hispanic or Latino (of any race)	623	10.7%

== Education ==
Much of Saranap is in the Walnut Creek Elementary School District while some is in the Lafayette Elementary School District. All of Saranap is in the Acalanes Union High School District.
