= Acalanes Ridge, California =

Acalanes Ridge
- Unincorporated Community; Census Designated Place
- Position in California. Acalanes Ridge (the United States)
- Coordinates: 37°54′17″N 122°04′43″W
- Country: United States
- State: California
- County: Contra Costa

Area
  - Total: 0.46 sq mi (1.19 km^{2})
  - Land: 0.46 sq mi (1.19 km^{2})
  - Water: 0 sq mi (0.00 km^{2}) 0%
- Elevation: 750 ft (230 m)

Population (2020)
  - Total: 1,285
  - Density: 2,788/sq mi (1,076.6/km^{2})
- Time zone: UTC-8 (Pacific (PST))
  - Summer (DST): UTC-7 (PDT)
- FIPS code: 06-00135
- GNIS feature ID: 2582926

Acalanes Ridge is a census-designated place in Contra Costa County, California, United States. Acalanes Ridge sits at an elevation of 499 feet (152 m). The population was 1,285 at the 2020 Census.

Acalanes Ridge was created a census-designated place for the 2010 census, and comes alphabetically first among all census-designated places in California.

== History ==
Acalanes Ridge is named after the area's historical Native American residents, the Sacalanes.

== Demographics ==
Historical population
Census	Pop.	Note	%±
2010	1,137		—
2020	1,285		13.0%
U.S. Decennial Census; 1860–1870 1880-1890; 1900 1910 1920; 1930 1940 1950; 1960 1970 1980; 1990 2000 2010; 2020

Acalanes Ridge first appeared as a census designated place in the 2010 U.S. census formed from part of Walnut Creek city and additional area.

=== Racial and ethnic composition ===
Acalanes Ridge CDP, California – Racial and ethnic composition Note: the US Census treats Hispanic/Latino as an ethnic category. This table excludes Latinos from the racial categories and assigns them to a separate category. Hispanics/Latinos may be of any race.
Race / Ethnicity (NH = Non-Hispanic)	Pop 2010	Pop 2020	% 2010	% 2020
White alone (NH)	908	918	79.86%	71.44%
Black or African American alone (NH)	5	9	0.44%	0.70%
Native American or Alaska Native alone (NH)	6	1	0.53%	0.08%
Asian alone (NH)	125	175	10.99%	13.62%
Native Hawaiian or Pacific Islander alone (NH)	2	0	0.18%	0.00%
Other race alone (NH)	5	8	0.44%	0.62%
Mixed race or Multiracial (NH)	36	67	3.17%	5.21%
Hispanic or Latino (any race)	50	107	4.40%	8.33%
Total	1,137	1,285	100.00%	100.00%

=== 2020 census ===
As of the 2020 census, Acalanes Ridge had a population of 1,285, with a population density of 2,787.4 inhabitants per square mile (1,076.2/km^{2}).

100.0% of residents lived in urban areas and 0.0% lived in rural areas. The Census also reported that 100% of the population lived in households.

There were 475 households, out of which 34.7% included children under the age of 18, 66.3% were married-couple households, 3.2% were cohabiting couple households, 17.7% had a female householder with no spouse or partner present, and 12.8% had a male householder with no spouse or partner present. Of all households, 18.5% were one person households, and 9.7% were one person aged 65 or older. The average household size was 2.71, and there were 376 families (79.2% of all households).

The age distribution was 20.9% under the age of 18, 6.7% aged 18 to 24, 18.7% aged 25 to 44, 30.0% aged 45 to 64, and 23.7% aged 65 or older. The median age was 47.6 years. For every 100 females, there were 99.5 males; for every 100 females age 18 and over, there were 97.5 males age 18 and over.

There were 487 housing units at an average density of 1,056.4 units per square mile (407.9 units/km^{2}). Of these, 475 (97.5%) were occupied and 2.5% were vacant. Of occupied units, 86.7% were owner-occupied and 13.3% were occupied by renters. The homeowner vacancy rate was 0.2% and the rental vacancy rate was 7.2%.

== Education ==
Most of Acalanes Ridge is served by the Walnut Creek Elementary School District while some is within the Lafayette Elementary School District. All of Acalanes Ridge is served by the Acalanes Union High School District.
