= Castle Hill, California =

Castle Hill
- census-designated place
- Position in California.
- Coordinates: 37°52′23″N 122°03′26″W
- Country: United States
- State: California
- County: Contra Costa

Area
  - Total: 0.58 sq mi (1.51 km^{2})
  - Land: 0.58 sq mi (1.51 km^{2})
  - Water: 0 sq mi (0.00 km^{2}) 0%
- Elevation: 302 ft (92 m)

Population (2020)
  - Total: 1,271
  - Density: 2,174.5/sq mi (839.56/km^{2})
- Time zone: UTC-8 (Pacific (PST))
  - Summer (DST): UTC-7 (PDT)
- FIPS code: 06-11915
- GNIS feature ID: 2582967

Castle Hill is a census-designated place in Contra Costa County, California, United States. Castle Hill sits at an elevation of 302 feet (92 m). The 2020 United States census reported Castle Hill's population was 1,271.

== History ==
The surrounding area was once inhabited by the Saklans. A Saklan village, which was possibly occupied from 1500 until 1772, is located near the mouth of Tice Creek. It contains multiple bedrock mortars used for processing acorns and other foodstuffs as well as a small spring. Its location along is not far from its confluence with the much larger Las Trampas Creek would have been advantageous to the Saklans who inhabited it. A small plaque marks the site which sits next to the bus stop at Tice Valley Boulevard and Montecillo Drive.

== Geography ==
According to the United States Census Bureau, the CDP has a total area of 0.585 square mile (1.515 km^{2}), all land.

== Demographics ==
Historical population
Census	Pop.	Note	%±
2010	1,299		—
2020	1,271		−2.2%
U.S. Decennial Census; 2010

Castle Hill first appeared as a census designated place in the 2010 U.S. census formed from part of Alamo CDP.

=== 2020 census ===
As of the 2020 census, Castle Hill had a population of 1,271 and a population density of 2,172.6 inhabitants per square mile (838.8/km^{2}). The age distribution was 21.7% under the age of 18, 4.2% aged 18 to 24, 16.8% aged 25 to 44, 29.8% aged 45 to 64, and 27.4% aged 65 or older. The median age was 49.7 years. For every 100 females, there were 93.5 males, and for every 100 females age 18 and over there were 92.8 males age 18 and over.

The census reported that 99.1% of the population lived in households, no one lived in non-institutionalized group quarters, and 0.9% were institutionalized. 100.0% of residents lived in urban areas, while 0.0% lived in rural areas.

There were 455 households, out of which 32.5% had children under the age of 18. Of all households, 70.1% were married-couple households, 4.0% were cohabiting couple households, 16.7% had a female householder with no spouse or partner present, and 9.2% had a male householder with no spouse or partner present. 15.8% of households were one person, and 9.9% were one person aged 65 or older. The average household size was 2.77. There were 365 families (80.2% of all households).

There were 479 housing units at an average density of 818.8 units per square mile (316.1 units/km^{2}). Of these, 455 were occupied and 24 (5.0%) were vacant. Of occupied units, 91.9% were owner-occupied and 8.1% were occupied by renters. The homeowner vacancy rate was 1.6% and the rental vacancy rate was 4.7%.

Racial composition as of the 2020 census
Race	Number	Percent
White	938	73.8%
Black or African American	9	0.7%
American Indian and Alaska Native	3	0.2%
Asian	149	11.7%
Native Hawaiian and Other Pacific Islander	7	0.6%
Some other race	28	2.2%
Two or more races	137	10.8%
Hispanic or Latino (of any race)	91	7.2%

== Education ==
Castle Hill is served by the Walnut Creek Elementary School District and the Acalanes Union High School District.
