= AUHSD =

AUHSD may refer to:

- Anaheim Union High School District, a public school district in Orange County, California
- Acalanes Union High School District, a public school district in Contra Costa County, California
