= Raciti =

Raciti is an Italian surname. Notable people with the surname include:

- Filippo Raciti (1967–2007), Italian police officer
- Sonia Raciti (born 1989), South African model
- Travis Raciti (born 1992), American footballer
- David Raciti (born 1990), Research scientist at The National Institute of Standards and Technology, U.S.A.
