= Tice Creek =

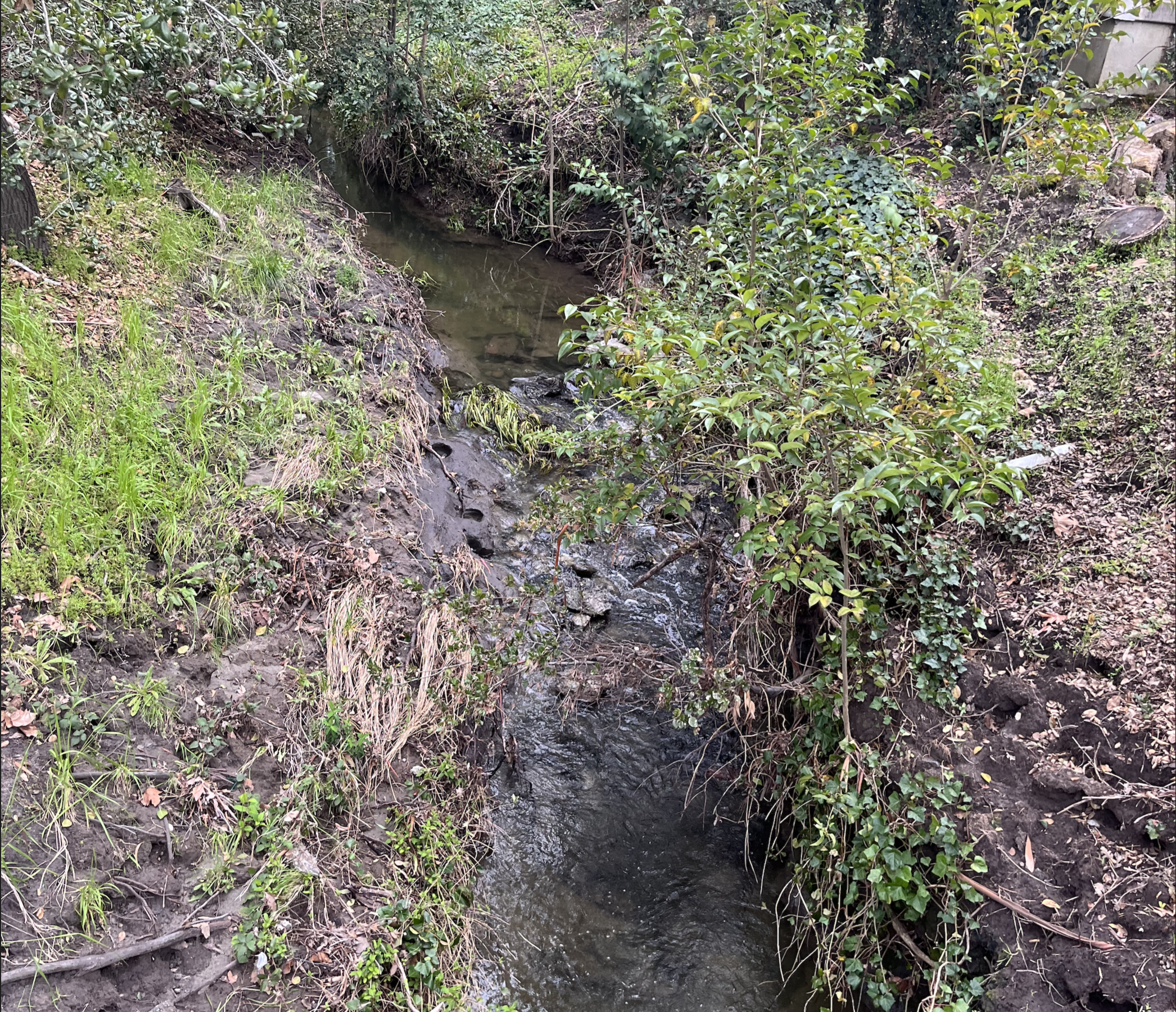
- A suburbanized Tice Creek in Rossmoor, Walnut Creek, California

Location
- Country: United States
- State: California
- Region: Bay Area
- District: Contra Costa County

Physical characteristics
- Mouth: Las Trampas Creek
  - coordinates: 37°53′39″N 122°03′34″W
- Length: 4.1 m (13 ft)

Basin features
- Cities: Lafayette, CA

Tice Creek is a minor creek in Contra Costa County, California in the San Francisco Bay Area. It is approximately 4.1 miles (6.6 km) long. It is a tributary of Las Trampas Creek, which itself is a major tributary to Walnut Creek which in turn drains into Suisun Bay. The name comes from the surname of a settler family who settled in the Tice valley after California's annexation to the United States. In the Mexican era, this creek was known as Las Juntas.

== Course ==
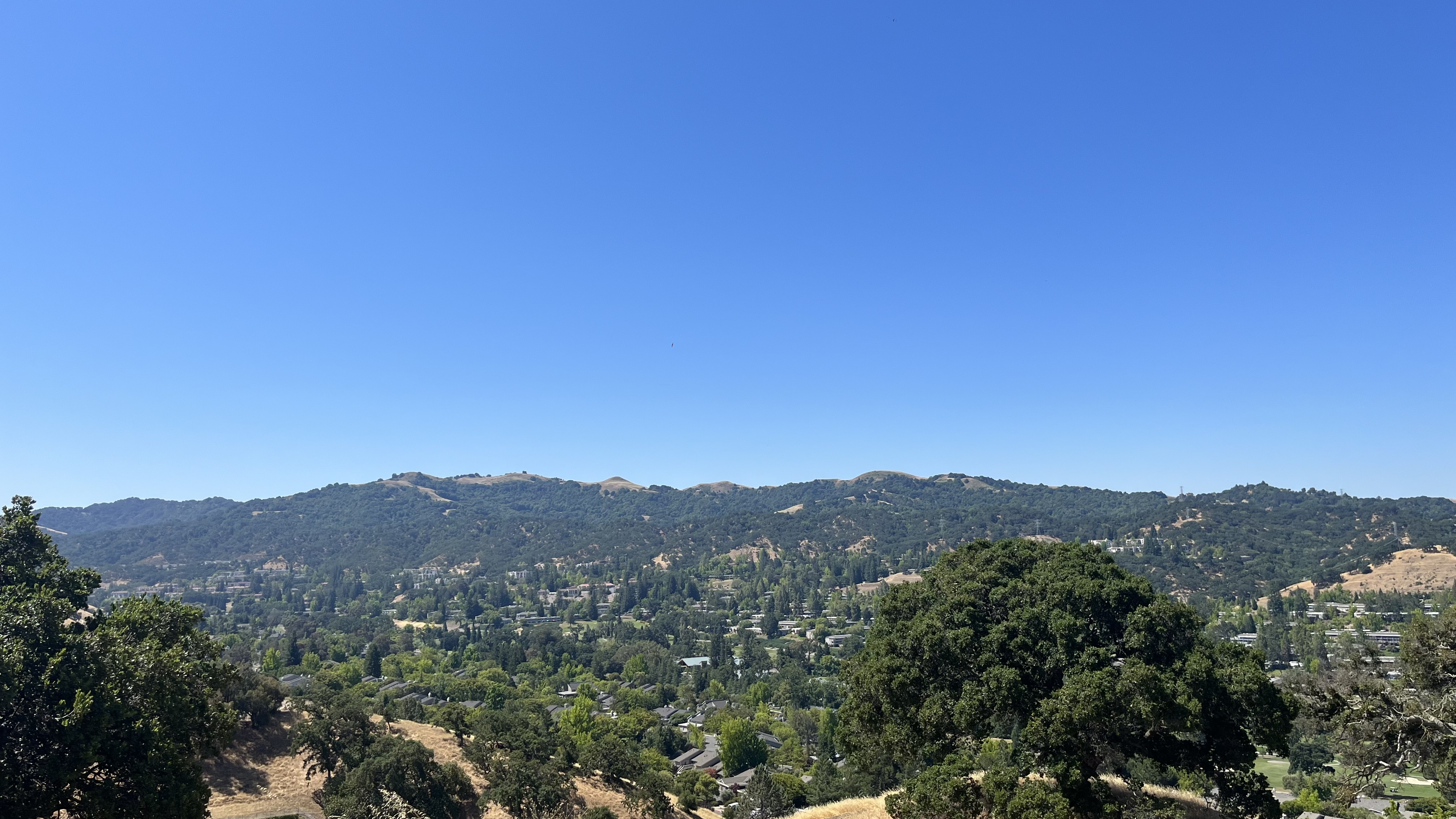
The extensively suburbanized valley of Tice Creek. Las Trampas Peak looms in the background (July 1st, 2023)

Tice Creek begins as a two small and intermittent streams emitting from a number of springs that surface in the hills above the senior-living community at Rossmoor, Walnut Creek, California.

As a result of suburban development, many of the creek's tributaries are confined to concrete channels or culverts, which seek to reduce the impact of flooding. Tice Creek runs northward through the Rossmoor golf course where its channel has been heavily modified and in some places runs over concrete. After exiting Rossmoor, Tice Creek makes an abrupt turn to the east, where it joins with Las Trampas Creek shortly above its confluence with San Ramon Creek.

== Geography ==
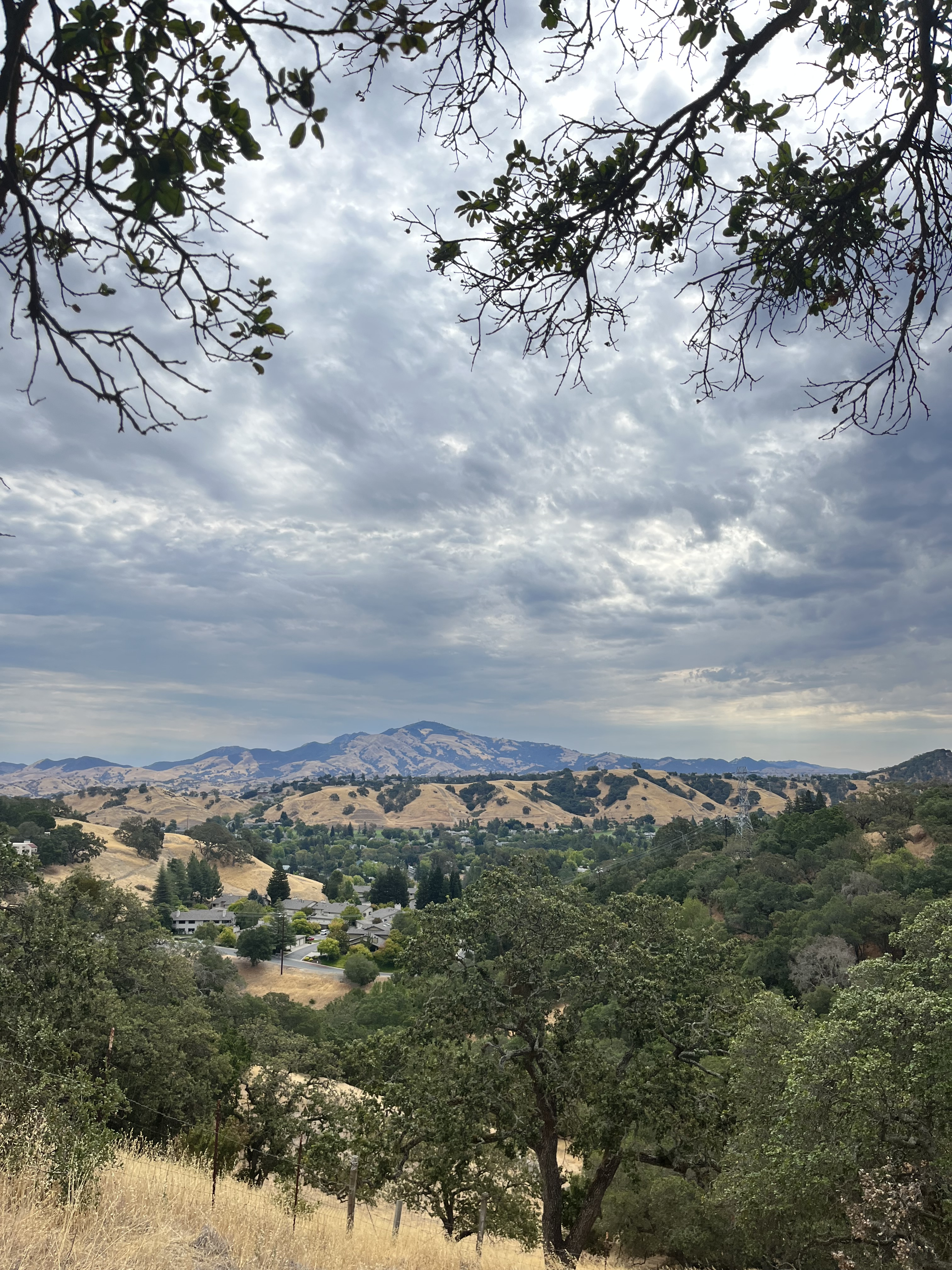
A view of the Tice Creek valley with Mount Diablo in the background (August 1st, 2022)

Tice Creek drains a portion of the interior Berkeley Hills, which are a member of the Inner Coast Ranges in the East Bay region, across the San Francisco Bay from San Francisco, California.

The Tice Valley is situated in between the communities of Burton Valley and Walnut Creek, California. The gated senior community of Rossmoor, Walnut Creek, California occupies the valley floor. Virtually the entirety of the flat land as well as a sizeable portion of the hillsides in the Tice Creek watershed have been developed for suburban or recreational use.

To the south, the Tice Creek watershed is bordered by the 5,778 acre Las Trampas Regional Wilderness.

== Geology ==
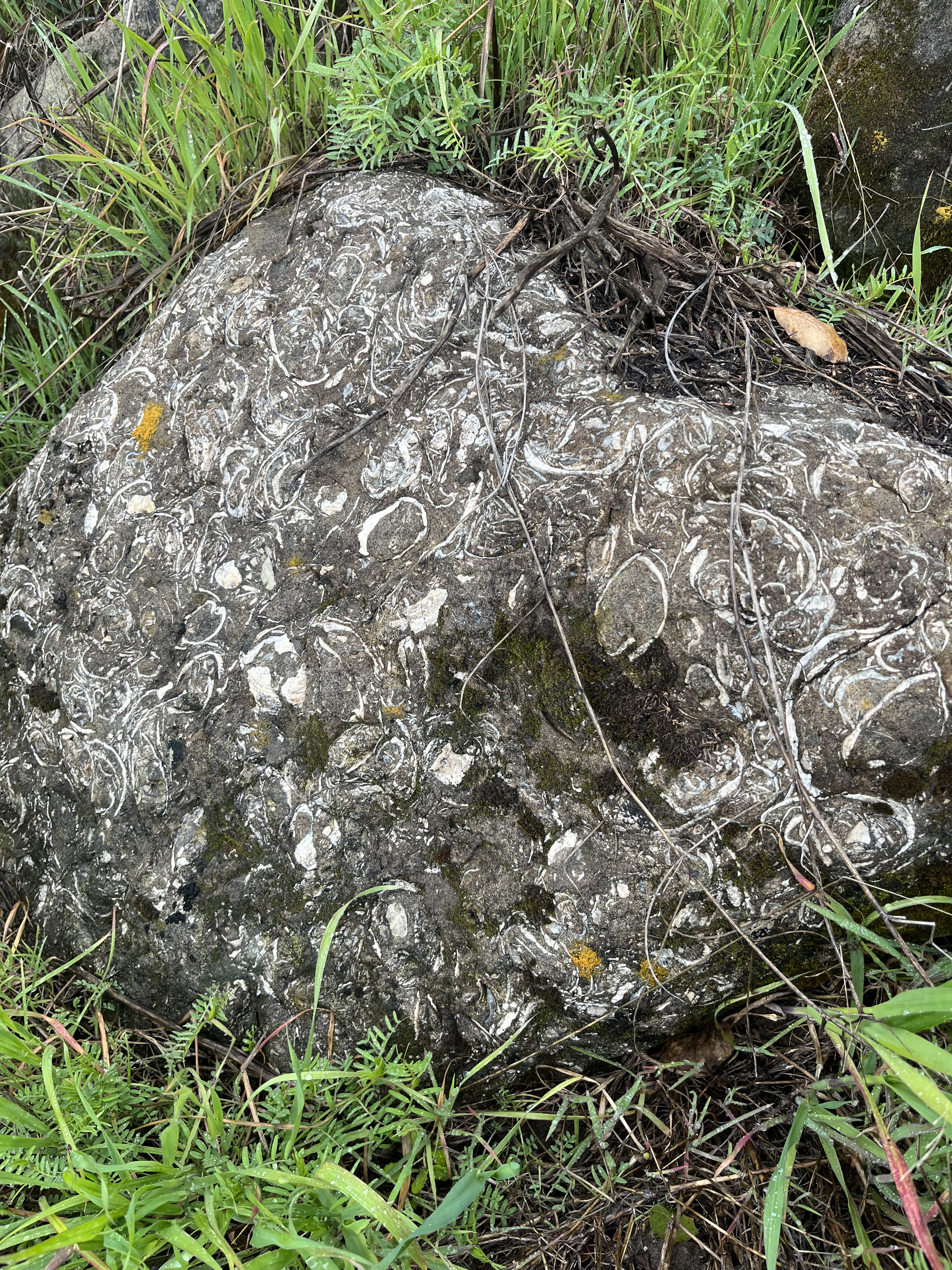
Sandstone of the Briones Formation bearing fossils of ancient mollusks along Tice Creek (March 11th, 2023)

The Tice Creek watershed is defined by a broad north–south trending valley called the Tice Valley. The transform faulting characteristic of much of the West Coast has divided the land up into a series of small valleys that generally trend north to south. It is speculated that the Tice Valley's present wide form is the result of rifting.

Like many streams on the California coast, Tice Creek's course is thought to roughly follow a fault system, particularly the Calaveras Fault and its extensions.

White tuffaceous rocks of the Orinda Formation occur in bands among the hills on the western side of the Tice Creek Valley. Igneous rocks such as these are uncommon in the area and more characteristic of the western slope of the California Coast Ranges.

== Ecology ==
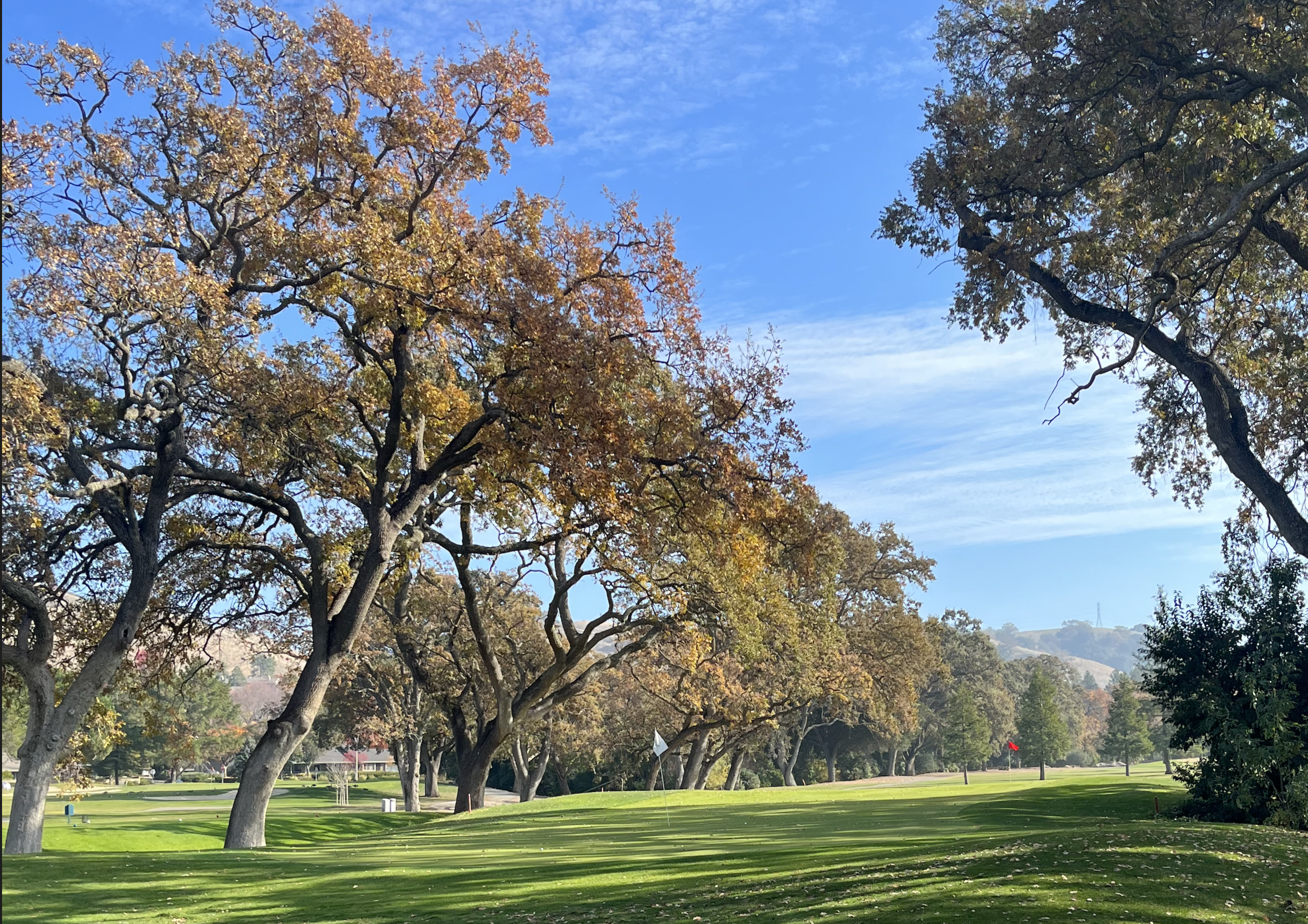
Valley oak trees line Tice Creek as it courses through the Rossmoor Golf Course (November 25th, 2022)

Tice Creek has been significantly degraded ecologically since historic times. The introduction of impermeable surfaces as well as residential infrastructure relating to the community of Rossmoor, Walnut Creek, California has heavily altered the character of the stream.

Invasive and exotic species of plants have replaced native Californian vegetation in much of their habitat along the creek. Tice Creek retains little riparian vegetation along its course through the Rossmoor golf course.

Tice Creek does however maintain an impressive collection of heritage trees along its banks, mostly Valley oak and Coast live oak as well as California buckeye and California bay. The upper, steeper portions of the Tice Creek watershed also retain remnant habitat containing old-growth specimens.

The well-watered grasses and landscaping of the Rossmoor Golf Course attract multiple species of local wildlife, like black-tailed deer, turkey and ducks and coyote which are seen frequently. The habitats in and around the creek support a population of songbirds as well as raptors. Amphibians of various types inhabit the creek.

Tice Creek historically hosted a run of Steelhead trout and possibly salmon. Native species like Steelhead trout and salmon have been extirpated from Tice Creek as a result of pollution, urban development and the installation of multiple channel modifications which inhibit their access to spawning areas.

== History ==
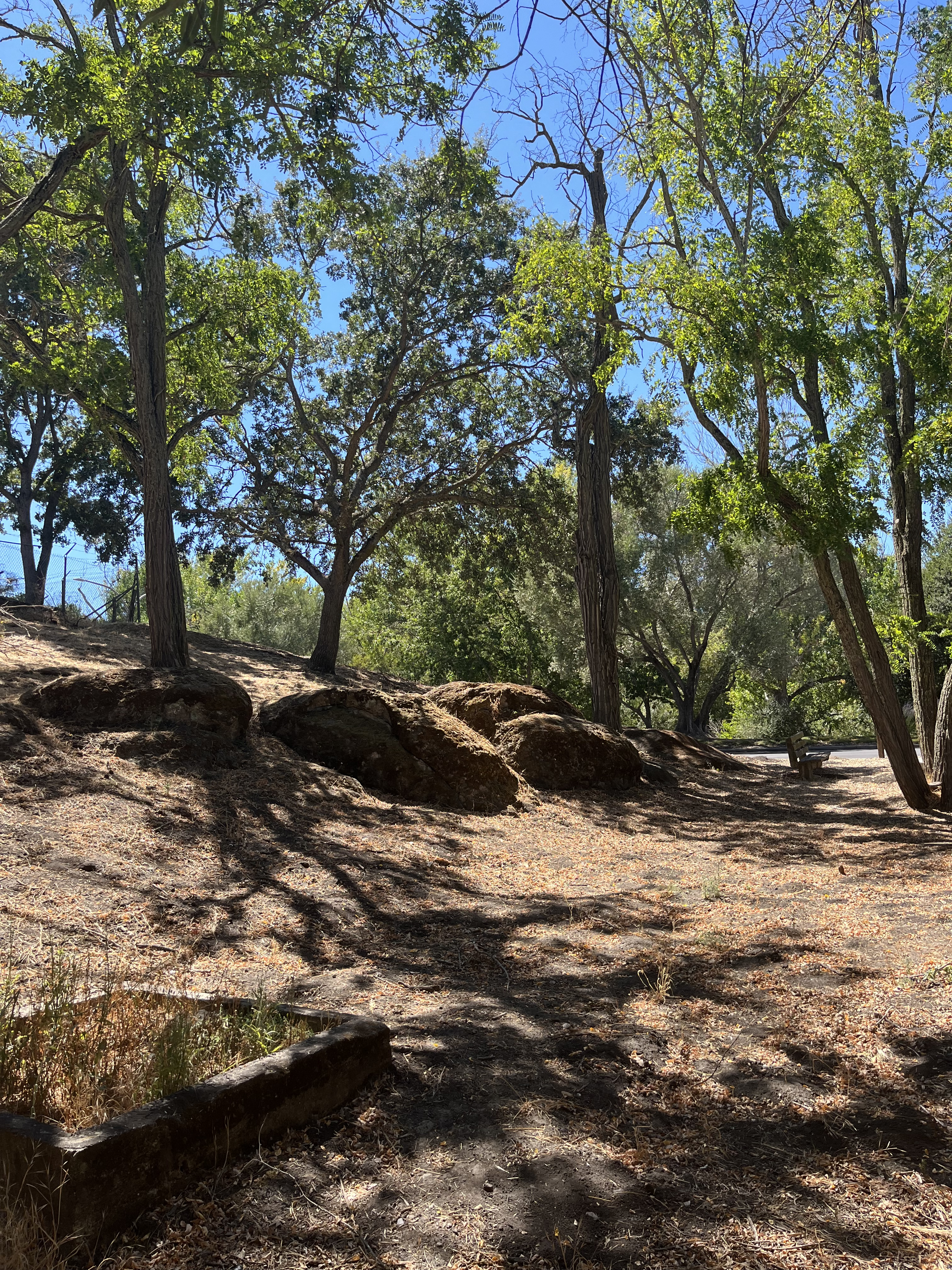
An internal view of part of the Saclan village on Tice Creek. The boulders bear bedrock mortars (August 10th, 2022)

A village of around 80 Saclan Bay Miwok people lived along Tice Creek at the mouth of the Tice Valley. The community in the valley was thought to have been there from around 1500 AD to the Spanish invasion of California in the 1770s. Though Tice Creek and its tributaries did not always carry water, the natives erected their village on a small year-round spring adjacent to the creek's banks.

Tice Creek meandered through a wide and open Tice valley, dotted with groves of oak trees from which the natives derived their principle food source: acorns. The Saclan in the Tice Creek valley had access to a wide range of resources and dwelled in the center of one of the most densely populated places in pre-Columbian North America. When compared to other native groups in the Americas, the Saclan lived prosperous lives dictated by strict spiritual and social guidelines.

During the construction of Rossmoor, Walnut Creek, California in the 1960s, a large excavation of the Saclan village was carried out by the University of California, Berkeley under the supervision of Dr. David Frederickson. Burials, tools, jewelry and evidence of dwellings were uncovered, showing continued occupation of the site for hundreds of years.

Tice Creek is unique among many urbanized creeks in California in that parts of its native Californian past are still visible and accessible. What remains of the Saclan's village after heavy development, their mortar rocks and spring, sit behind a bus stop at the entrance to Rossmoor, Walnut Creek, California marked by a small sign describing the site.
