= East Bay Housing Organizations =

East Bay Housing Organizations is a non-profit, membership based organization that has helped advocate for affordable housing in the East Bay of the San Francisco Bay Area since 1984. EBHO promotes the continuation and expansion of affordable housing through coalitions, providing information, and community involvement. For instance, EBHO supports affordable homes in the bay area through educating local officials about the issue, including the Oakland Housing Authority and Oakland City Council members.

EBHO has several campaigns and committees covering various topics relating to affordable housing. EBHO's signature event is Affordable Housing Week in May, during which the organization hosts over a dozen events and programs.
