= Saklan tribe =

Native American Miwok tribe

The Saklan are a tribe of the Native American Miwok community, based just south of San Pablo and Suisun Bays, in Contra Costa County, California. Their historical tribal lands ranged from Moraga, to San Leandro Creek, to Lafayette.

== History ==
The Saklan were historically called the Sacalanes, based on historical documentation related to Spanish contact. They are mentioned under that name, and related spellings, in the records for Mission Dolores between 1794 and 1821. They were first called the Saklan, in 1797. In 1816 they were mentioned again, as the Sacalanes, in the reports of the first Kotzebue expedition in 1816. They inhabited the interior valleys of today's East Bay region of the San Francisco Bay Area, with period maps showing permanent and temporary settlements throughout the Lafayette Creek, Las Trampas Creek and San Leandro Creek watersheds and were members of a wide regional trade network. Though mostly semi-arid today as a result of a depleted water table from extensive farming, the region formerly had abundant springs and marshes that supported large villages. The Saklans and other nearby cultures drew upon the great vegetable and animal wealth of the area to sustain themselves throughout the year, and this allowed them to live at much higher population densities than most other places in North America.

Like many other indigenous cultures throughout modern-day California, in autumn the Saklans harvested prodigious amounts of acorns from the large forests of oaks that still blanket much of their ancestral homeland, preferring those of the California Black Oak for their taste but nonetheless using acorns from a variety of oak species. The productive oak groves in the region were tended to by successive generations of Saklans by use of fire and other processes in order to maintain acorn production. The seeds of wildflowers, pine nuts and multiple species of berries and roots were also gathered and processed by the Saklans. The favorable climate and geography of the Bay Area, as well as the constant maintenance of the forests and grasslands by the Saklan and their neighbors allowed for a wealth of animal life to coexist with the dense human population. Formerly antelope, Tule Elk and grizzly bears were present alongside the blacktail deer and mountain lion, which are the existing remnants the region's suite of large mammals. Beavers were present in large numbers throughout the Bay Area and the rest of California, and provided an important ecological service by saving large pools of water behind their dams during the summer dry season, keeping the ecosystem's thirst at bay. All of these animals were hunted by the indigenous peoples of the Bay Area, each with its own ritual and spiritual significance. Villages that sometimes contained dozens of families were almost always located along watercourses, in which the people bathed, drank and fished for salmon and trout migrating upstream from the Pacific. Strategies for catching fish included spears, weirs and stunning the fish using the fruit of the California Buckeye. The Saclans would have had access to a wide variety of trade goods due to their position close to the mouths of the two great rivers of California, the Sacramento River and the San Joaquin River as well as the Pacific Ocean. Trade with other tribes was essential to Saklan life and it is likely that the majority of interactions between them and their neighbors were peaceful, though they were no strangers to armed conflict.

We set out at six, following the same valley in a southerly direction, the excellence of the path covered with many trees. The land was all level land, with grass and trees and many good creeks, with numerous villages and many gentle, peaceful Indians.

— Father Juan Crespi, describing the San Ramon Valley, which bordered Saklan territory in 1772

The world the Saklan inhabited was one full of mystery and spiritual meaning. Each band would have known their territory intimately, and cared for it as one would their kin. Every feature: mountains, hills and valleys and all they contained had spiritual significance and an origin. Saklan territory sat on and between two ranges of hills, now known as Las Trampas and the Briones Hills and it is likely that these features along with nearby Mount Diablo held considerable spiritual weight due to the large number of archaeological sites in the two areas, as well as their prominence in the landscape.

Beginning in 1772, expeditions of Spanish missionaries and soldiers from nearby Mission San José entered the San Ramon Valley looking to circumnavigate the Bay by land, and no doubt encroached upon the territory of the Saklan. Early contact was fleeting and mostly peaceful, with the Spanish initially never spending prolonged periods in the region, and never constructing a mission there as they had planned to do. However, in the late 1700s, Spanish cattle from the prosperous mission at San Jose began to graze the territory of the Saklan and their neighbors. The cattle brought profound changes to the landscape. They introduced highly invasive Mediterranean grasses that quickly destroyed the prairie ecosystems where the Saklan foraged, and outcompeted native herbivores for pasture. In a cultural landscape that was being devastated by the missions' constant need for new converts, the Saklans stood as one of the few groups who mounted continued resistance against the efforts of the Spanish. Christian natives were sent to the Saklans around modern day Lafayette in the late 1700s to convince them to give up their culture and come to Mission San Jose; they were killed by the Saklans who wanted nothing to do with the Spanish way of life. A punitive expedition was sent to the area in 1797 to repress the Saklans, and a battle was fought in modern-day Lafayette, CA. These troubles were just the beginning for the Saklan, the devastation wrought upon them by European diseases like smallpox and measles would spell the end for life as the Saklan knew it. From the 1780s through to the early 1820s, it is clear from the records of San Francisco's Mission Dolores, where many Saklan fled as a result of societal collapse from disease, that the population of the area was severely diminished. By the 1810s the region was essentially devoid of humans.

== Legacy ==
The former site of a Saklan village, which was possibly occupied from 1500 until 1772, is located near the mouth of Tice Valley in Castle Hill, California. It contains multiple bedrock mortars used for processing acorns and other foodstuffs as well as a small spring. Its location along Tice Creek not far from its confluence with the much larger Las Trampas Creek would have been advantageous to the Saklans who inhabited it. A small plaque marks the site which sits next to the bus stop at Tice Valley Boulevard and Montecillo Drive. Many of the best archaeological sites, however, were located on the flat, fertile lands along the numerous creeks in the area. These areas were extensively cleared and tilled for agriculture starting in the mid 1800s, but today have been covered by extensive suburban urban and suburban development which permanently entomb what is likely to be a wealth of anthropological material. Early settlers described having to stop their plows every few yards to pick out the shards of pottery and other indigenous artifacts that filled the soil. Material remnants do remain however, in the hills above towns like Lafayette and Moraga, which speak to the strong presence of the Saklan and their ancestors for thousands of years in the area. The forests of oak and laurel that the Saklans inhabited were spared from the worst of the timber industry during the 1800s because of their lack of economic value and preserve the memory of the Saklans in their presence on the landscape. Remnant trees hundreds of years old, most often oaks and coast redwoods, still stand in most of the towns of the area as well as the hills that surround them, some of the last living links between today's world and that of the Saklan.

The town of Acalanes Ridge, California was named after the community, of whom lived in the area. Today, many Saklan descendants have intermarried with the larger Chochenyo Ohlone community.

== See also ==
- Bay Miwok language
