= Shell Ridge, California =

Shell Ridge
- Census-designated place
- Position in California.
- Coordinates: 37°54′21″N 122°02′04″W
- Country: United States
- State: California
- County: Contra Costa

Area
  - Total: 0.431 sq mi (1.115 km^{2})
  - Land: 0.431 sq mi (1.115 km^{2})
  - Water: 0 sq mi (0 km^{2}) 0%
- Elevation: 300 ft (90 m)

Population (2020)
  - Total: 1,014
  - Density: 2,355/sq mi (909.4/km^{2})
- Time zone: UTC−8 (Pacific)
  - Summer (DST): UTC−7 (PDT)
- Area code: 925
- FIPS code: 06-71362
- GNIS feature ID: 2583136

Shell Ridge is a census-designated place in Contra Costa County, California, United States. Shell Ridge sits at an elevation of 295 feet (90 m). The 2020 United States census reported Shell Ridge's population was 1,014.

== Geography ==
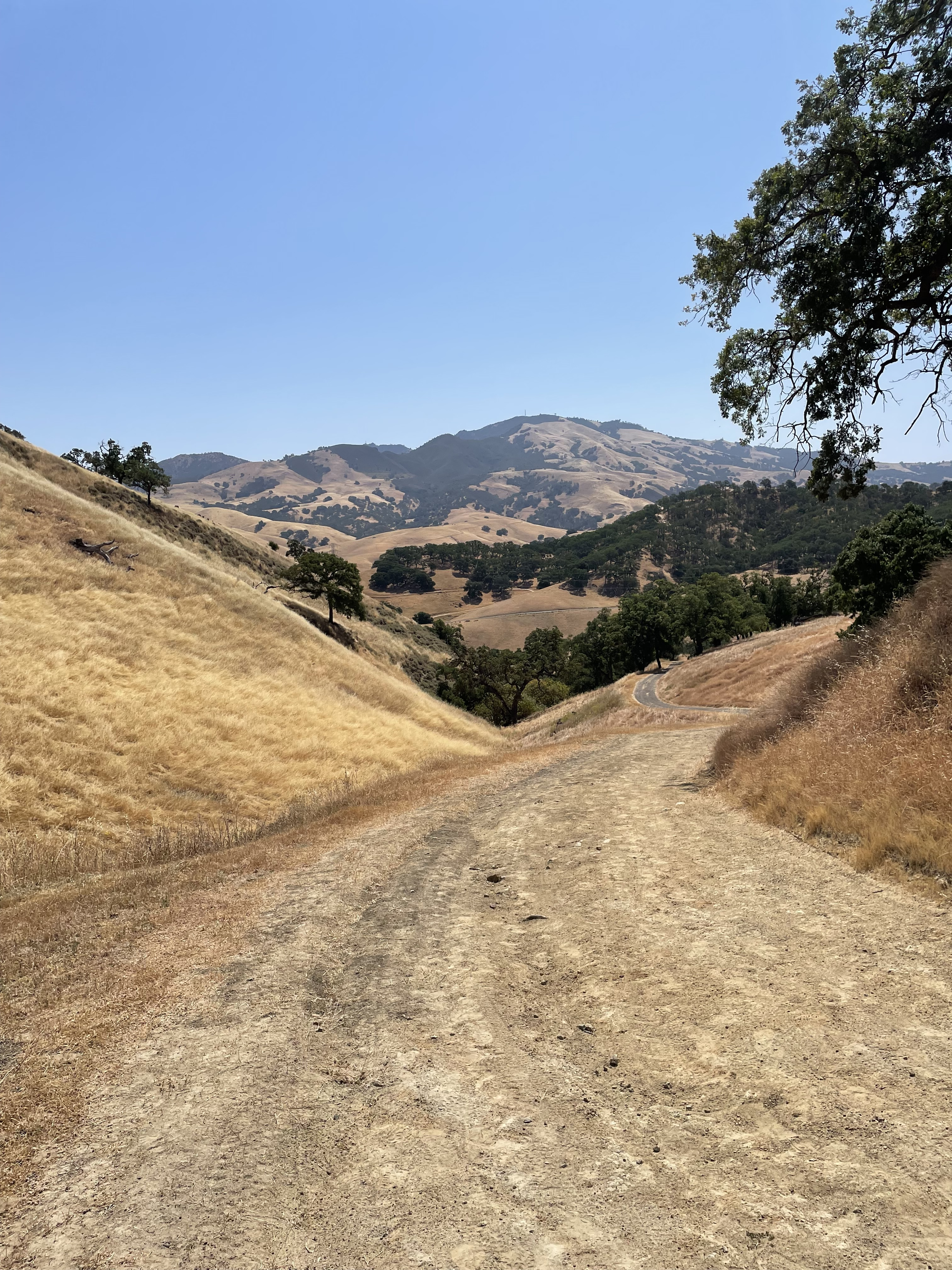
Shell Ridge Open Space

According to the United States Census Bureau, the CDP has a total area of 0.430 square miles (1.11 km^{2}), all land. The Shell Ridge Open Space is the largest open space area in Walnut Creek and contains 31 miles of trails.

== Demographics ==
Historical population
| Census | Pop. | Note | %± |
|---|---|---|---|
| 2010 | 959 | | — |
| 2020 | 1,014 | | 5.7% |
U.S. Decennial Census; 2010

=== 2020 census ===
As of the 2020 census, Shell Ridge had a population of 1,014. The population density was 2,358.1 inhabitants per square mile (910.5/km^{2}). The median age was 49.4 years; 23.6% of residents were under the age of 18, 4.4% were aged 18 to 24, 16.9% were aged 25 to 44, 31.2% were aged 45 to 64, and 24.0% were 65 years of age or older. For every 100 females, there were 100.0 males, and for every 100 females age 18 and over, there were 96.2 males age 18 and over.

The census reported that 100% of the population lived in households. There were 367 households, of which 34.1% had children under the age of 18 living in them. Of all households, 71.7% were married-couple households, 4.9% were cohabiting couple households, 7.4% were households with a male householder and no spouse or partner present, and 16.1% were households with a female householder and no spouse or partner present. About 15.2% of all households were made up of individuals, and 9.6% had someone living alone who was 65 years of age or older. The average household size was 2.76. There were 292 families (79.6% of all households).

There were 377 housing units at an average density of 876.7 units per square mile (338.5 units/km^{2}). Of all housing units, 2.7% were vacant; the homeowner vacancy rate was 0.3% and the rental vacancy rate was 8.1%. Of the 367 occupied units, 90.7% were owner-occupied and 9.3% were occupied by renters.

100.0% of residents lived in urban areas, while 0.0% lived in rural areas.

Racial composition as of the 2020 census
| Race | Number | Percent |
|---|---|---|
| White | 756 | 74.6% |
| Black or African American | 6 | 0.6% |
| American Indian and Alaska Native | 0 | 0.0% |
| Asian | 129 | 12.7% |
| Native Hawaiian and Other Pacific Islander | 0 | 0.0% |
| Some other race | 18 | 1.8% |
| Two or more races | 105 | 10.4% |
| Hispanic or Latino (of any race) | 73 | 7.2% |

=== 2010 census ===
Shell Ridge first appeared as a census designated place in the 2010 U.S. census.

== Education ==
A portion of Shell Ridge is in the Walnut Creek Elementary School District and the Acalanes Union High School District. Other parts are in the K-12 Mount Diablo Unified School District.
