= Steve Alexakos =

American football player (born 1946)

Steven Theodore Alexakos
No. 64, 68, 60
- Position: Guard

Personal information
- Born: December 15, 1946 (age 79); Lowell, Massachusetts, U.S.
- Listed height: 6 ft 2 in (1.88 m)
- Listed weight: 250 lb (113 kg)

Career information
- High school: Las Lomas (Walnut Creek, California)
- College: Arizona State (1965); San Jose State (1967-1968)
- NFL draft: 1969: 9th round, 209th overall pick

Career history
- Boston Patriots (1969)*; Seattle Rangers (1969); Denver Broncos (1970); New York Jets (1971)*; New York Giants (1971)
- * Offseason or practice squad member only

Career NFL statistics
- Games played: 18
- Games started: 1
- Stats at Pro Football Reference

Steven Theodore Alexakos (born December 15, 1946) is an American former professional football player who was a guard in the National Football League (NFL). He played college football for the Arizona State Sun Devils and San Jose State Spartans.

== Early life ==
Steven Alexakos was born on December 15, 1946, in Lowell, Massachusetts.

Alexakos attended Las Lomas High School in Walnut Creek, California.

== College career ==
After high school, Steve attended Junior College at Diablo Valley College from 1965 to 1966. He had committed to Arizona State University, where he was to play defense but was ruled scholastically ineligible due to a failed math test. He then went to San Jose State, where he played offensive guard from 1967 to 1968.

== Professional career ==
Listed at 6'-2" and 250 lbs, Alexakos was selected 209th overall in the ninth round by the 1969 Boston Patriots but played offensive guard for the 1970 Denver Broncos and the 1971 New York Giants

- 1970, wearing No. 68, Alexakos started one game and played in 8 total during Denver's 1970 season.
- 1971, wearing No. 60, Alexakos played in 10 games with the Giants.

== Later life ==
In 1991, Alexakos was working as the Junior varsity line coach at De La Salle High School (Concord, California) when he was moved up to the Varsity Staff. Here, he was instrumental as part of the coaching staff that established the Spartans longest winning streak of 151 games. Then in 1995, he took a job as line coach for one year at San Jose State.

References:

- Book: "When The Game Stands Tall: the story of the De La Salle Spartans and Football's Longest Winning Streak" By Neil Hayes, Bob Larson, Tony La Russa, 2003.
