= College Park High School (Pleasant Hill, California) =

Public high school in Pleasant Hill, California, United States

Location
- 201 Viking Drive; Pleasant Hill, California 94523-1809; United States; 37°57′54″N 122°04′15″W

Information
- School type: Public high school
- Founded: 1960
- Principal: Ronald Richardson
- Teaching staff: 82.09 (FTE)
- Grades: 9-12
- Enrollment: 1,997 (2023-2024)
- Student to teacher ratio: 24.33
- Language: English
- Area: Pleasant Hill, California
- Colors: Purple and white
- Mascot: Falcon
- Affiliation: Mount Diablo Unified School District
- Website: http://cphs.mdusd.org

College Park High School (CPHS) is a public high school located in Pleasant Hill, California, United States, situated adjacent to Valley View Middle School and Diablo Valley College. It is part of the Mount Diablo Unified School District (MDUSD) and serves most of Pleasant Hill, a portion of Concord, a portion of Martinez, and all of Pacheco. CPHS was honored as a 2013 California Distinguished School by the California Department of Education.

== History ==
College Park High School was founded in 1960 to alleviate population pressure from nearby Pleasant Hill High, which is now Pleasant Hill Middle School. The new institution chose the falcon for its mascot. The school had been constructed on land adjacent to Diablo Valley College, leading to the name College Park. A fierce rivalry developed between College Park and Pleasant Hill High until the latter closed. This rivalry was later transferred to both Alhambra and Northgate High Schools.

== Athletics ==
The school has won state championships in girls cross-country (2003 and 2004) and boys wrestling (1966-NORCAL champions, 1967-NORCAL-5TH, 1993-4TH CIF STATE, 1994-8TH CIF STATE).

== Notable alumni ==
- Cori Alexander - professional soccer player and photographer
- Maurice Benard - actor on the ABC soap opera General Hospital
- Rick Bodine - the plaintiff in the "burglar that fell through a skylight" lawsuit
- Tina Dupuy - syndicated columnist and author
- Amit Elor (born 2004) - freestyle wrestler, 2024 Olympic champion and 8x world champion
- Christian Encarnacion-Strand - Baltimore Orioles third baseman; 2021 fourth round pick
- Trevor Larnach - Minnesota Twins outfielder; 2018 first round pick
- Eteva Mauga-Clements (born 1999) - CFL linebacker for the Edmonton Elks
- McKenzie Moore (born 1992) - player in the Israeli Basketball Premier League
- Meredith Patterson - Broadway, television and film actress
- Zyon Pullin - NBA player
- Travis Raciti - former defensive end for the Philadelphia Eagles
- Melissa Seidemann (born 1990) - member of the US women's water polo Senior National team; Olympic gold medalist at the 2012 Olympic Games and the 2016 Olympic Games
