= San Miguel, Contra Costa County, California =

San Miguel
- Census-designated place
- Position in California.
- Coordinates: 37°53′15″N 122°02′08″W
- Country: United States
- State: California
- County: Contra Costa

Area
  - Total: 1.050 sq mi (2.719 km^{2})
  - Land: 1.050 sq mi (2.719 km^{2})
  - Water: 0 sq mi (0 km^{2}) 0%
- Elevation: 299 ft (91 m)

Population (2020)
  - Total: 3,591
  - Density: 3,421/sq mi (1,321/km^{2})
- Time zone: UTC-8 (Pacific (PST))
  - Summer (DST): UTC-7 (PDT)
- GNIS feature ID: 2583126

San Miguel is a census-designated place in Contra Costa County, California, United States. San Miguel sits at an elevation of 249 feet (76 m). The 2020 United States census reported San Miguel's population was 3,591.

== Geography ==
According to the United States Census Bureau, the CDP has a total area of 1.050 square miles (3 km^{2}), all land.

== Demographics ==
Historical population
Census	Pop.	Note	%±
2010	3,392		—
2020	3,591		5.9%
U.S. Decennial Census; 1850–1870 1880-1890; 1900 1910 1920; 1930 1940 1950; 1960 1970 1980; 1990 2000 2010

The 2020 United States census reported that San Miguel had a population of 3,591. The population density was 3,420.0 inhabitants per square mile (1,320.5/km^{2}). The racial makeup of San Miguel was 79.0% White, 0.7% African American, 0.1% Native American, 8.6% Asian, 0.3% Pacific Islander, 2.0% from other races, and 9.3% from two or more races. Hispanic or Latino of any race were 8.0% of the population.

The census reported that 99.9% of the population lived in households and 0.1% lived in non-institutionalized group quarters.

There were 1,296 households, out of which 35.6% included children under the age of 18, 70.7% were married-couple households, 3.5% were cohabiting couple households, 15.3% had a female householder with no partner present, and 10.6% had a male householder with no partner present. 14.6% of households were one person, and 9.5% were one person aged 65 or older. The average household size was 2.77. There were 1,063 families (82.0% of all households).

The age distribution was 22.6% under the age of 18, 6.6% aged 18 to 24, 16.6% aged 25 to 44, 32.1% aged 45 to 64, and 22.1% who were 65 years of age or older. The median age was 47.6 years. For every 100 females, there were 94.3 males.

There were 1,318 housing units at an average density of 1,255.2 units per square mile (484.6 units/km^{2}), of which 1,296 (98.3%) were occupied. Of these, 90.7% were owner-occupied, and 9.3% were occupied by renters.

== Education ==
San Miguel is in the Walnut Creek Elementary School District and the Acalanes Union High School District.
