= Martinez Unified School District =

Public school district in California, USA

Address
- 921 Susana Street Martinez, California, 94553; United States

District information
- Type: Public
- Grades: KG–12
- Schools: 9
- NCES District ID: 0624030

Students and staff
- Students: 3,787 (2025–2026)
- Teachers: 177.48 (on an FTE basis) (2025–2026)
- Staff: 151.44 (on an FTE basis) (2025–2026)
- Student–teacher ratio: 21.34 (2025–2026)

Other information
- Website: martinezusd.net

The Martinez Unified School District (MUSD) is a public school district in Contra Costa County, California. It currently serves over 4,000 students and operates 4 elementary schools, one middle school and one high school, with two alternative schools as well as an adult education program.

The district includes the majority of Martinez and the following locations: Alhambra Valley, Mountain View, the majority of Vine Hill, and portions of Reliez Valley.

== Elementary schools ==
- John Muir
- John Swett
- Las Juntas
- Morello Park

== Middle schools ==
- Martinez Junior High

== High schools ==
- Alhambra High - Official Website

== Alternative Schools ==
- Vicente Martinez Alternative High School
- Briones School
