= Las Lomas High School =

Public high school in California, United States

Coordinates: 37°53′28″N 122°03′24″W

Location
- 1460 South Main St. Walnut Creek, California 94596; United States

Information
- Type: Public
- Established: 1951
- School district: Acalanes Union High School District
- CEEB code: 053680
- Principal: Brian Sullivan
- Teaching staff: 78.27 (FTE)
- Enrollment: 1,568 (2023–2024)
- Student to teacher ratio: 20.03
- Colors: Maroon and gold
- Slogan: "Do The Knight Thing"
- Mascot: Knight
- Newspaper: The Page
- Yearbook: El Caballero
- Website: Las Lomas High School

Las Lomas High School (LLHS) is a public high school in Walnut Creek, California, United States. It was founded in 1951 by the Acalanes Union High School District, and opened its doors in the fall of 1952 to its first graduating class. Las Lomas was the second of five schools built within the Acalanes Union High School District.

== History ==
Las Lomas High School was founded in 1951 as part of the Acalanes Union High School District (AUHSD). Situated in the suburban city of Walnut Creek, the high school has been closely integrated with the local community, with the majority of its students being residents of Walnut Creek.

=== Athletic facilities ===
New tennis courts were completed during the 2011-2012 school year. George DeKlotz Stadium, Las Lomas' new football stadium and track, was finished in 2005. At the same time, the baseball field reopened after a year of remodeling. A year prior, Las Lomas completed construction on a new softball field. Other facilities include a swimming pool, gym, small gym, five tennis courts, locker rooms, and a weight room.

== Notable alumni ==
- Akhil Amar, constitutional scholar, Professor at Yale Law School.
- Brandon Harkins, professional golfer
- Kira Kazantsev, reporter, Miss America 2015
- Rich Nye, professional baseball player
- Markie Post, actress
- Katharine Ross, actress
- Cass McCombs, musician
- Savannah Louie, Survivor Season 49 Winner
- Bill Staley, professional football player
- Steve Alexakos, professional football player
- Jeff Richards, actor
