= Alhambra High School (Martinez, California) =

Coordinates: 38.00246°N 122.13405°W

Location
- 150 E Street; Martinez, California 94553; United States

Information
- School type: Public high school
- Founded: 1897
- School district: Martinez Unified School District
- Superintendent: Gigi Patrick
- Principal: Frank Beede
- Teaching staff: 48.90 (FTE)
- Grades: 9-12
- Enrollment: 1,070 (2023-2024)
- Student to teacher ratio: 21.88
- Language: English
- Colors: Blue and gold
- Mascot: Bulldog
- Website: ahs.martinezusd.net

Alhambra Senior High School (AHS) is a public high school in Martinez, California, United States which was first established in 1897. It is a part of the Martinez Unified School District. During the 2006–2007 academic year, the school had enrollment of approximately 1400 students. The school's mascot is "Spike" the bulldog, who can often be seen in appearances with "Spikette" at football games and rallies.

== History ==
From 1895 to 1899, a private school, known as the Martinez Academy, then a private school provided high school classes.

The discontinuance of the academy left Martinez without a high school. (Contra Costa Gazette January 20, 1956) In July 1901, the Alhambra Union High School District was organized. It was the second of the present day high schools to be instituted and one of four organized in the same year. Alhambra Union High School was established in 1901 according to the minutes of the school board meeting on July 31, 1901.

Their first high school campus was on Susana Street on the north side of Susan Street, between Estudillo Street and Court Street, where the School District Administration Building sits today. In the 1920s, the present campus was established on Alhambra Avenue, though all of the original buildings have been replaced.

The school mascot was the Panther from 1927 until 1947 when they changed their mascot to the Bulldogs.

== Campus ==
Alhambra's campus was built into one of the Bay Area's characteristic rolling hills. The campus was renovated in 1994, and is now set in a Spanish style reminiscent of the old campus. In 2003, the Center for the Arts (Performing Arts Building or PAB) was completed, which seats 350 and plays host to theatrical and musical performances. This is a marked improvement for the school's drama department, which previously performed in the school's "multi-use room", a combination cafeteria and stage space, also known by its sign above the main entrance doors, Commons. Most recently, the drama department received a new Black Box theater. The Center for the Arts also features rooms outside that are used to exhibit art. The Center for the Arts also has a large projector screen that can either hang down or retract into the ceiling above. This screen is often used for awareness programs for the students.

The school's synthetic field for football, baseball, soccer, and lacrosse borders the main avenue through town, and an all weather track, tennis courts and basketball are set on the top of a hill. The renovation also produced a large gym facility and a student commons.

== Academics ==
Alhambra Senior High 2012-13 State API score was 826 and the school or Student Groups scored at or above the statewide performance target of 800 in the 2012 Base.

In the 2008–2009 school year, 81% of Alhambra's total graduates enrolled in postsecondary institutions.

When comparing the Academic Performance Index, the SARC report found Alhambra to rank 8 out of 10 statewide in 2012–2013.

== Notable alumni ==
- Robert Stephenson, MLB player (Cincinnati Reds, Colorado Rockies, Pittsburgh Pirates)
- Norv Turner, National Football League coach
- Stan Van Gundy, former basketball coach, television commentator for the NBA on TNT and College Basketball on CBS Sports

== Sources ==
- "School Accountability Report Card; Reported For School Year 2004-05"
- "2006-2007 Course Catalog; Alhambra High School"
- "USA Track and Field Coaching Education; Level 1 School"
- "'Focus on Learning' Visiting Committee Report - Alhambra High School"
