= Vine Hill, California =

Vine Hill
- census-designated place
- Location in Contra Costa County and the state of California

- Location in the United States
- Coordinates: 38°00′31″N 122°05′46″W
- Country: United States
- State: California
- County: Contra Costa

Government
  - State Senate: Tim Grayson (D)
  - State Assembly: Anamarie Avila Farias (D)
  - U. S. Congress: Mark DeSaulnier (D)

Area
  - Total: 1.503 sq mi (3.894 km^{2})
  - Land: 1.503 sq mi (3.894 km^{2})
  - Water: 0 sq mi (0 km^{2})
- Elevation: 30 ft (9.1 m)

Population (2020)
  - Total: 4,323
  - Density: 2,875/sq mi (1,110/km^{2})
- Time zone: UTC-8 (PST)
  - Summer (DST): UTC-7 (PDT)
- ZIP code: 94553
- Area code: 925
- FIPS code: 06-82842
- GNIS feature IDs: 1652648, 2409517

Vine Hill is a census-designated place (CDP) in Contra Costa County, California, United States. The population was 4,323 at the 2020 census. It is located 2.25 miles (3.6 km) east of downtown Martinez.

== Geography ==
According to the United States Census Bureau, the CDP has a total area of 1.5 square miles (3.9 km^{2}), all land.

== Demographics ==
Historical population
Census	Pop.	Note	%±
1980	6,129		—
1990	3,214		−47.6%
2000	3,260		1.4%
2010	3,761		15.4%
2020	4,323		14.9%
U.S. Decennial Census; 1860–1870 1880-1890; 1900 1910 1920; 1930 1940 1950; 1960 1970 1980; 1990 2000 2010; 2020

Vine Hill first appeared as a census-designated place in the 1980 United States census under the name Vine-Hill-Pacheco; the name was changed to Vine Hill for the 1990 U.S. census.

=== Racial and ethnic composition ===
Vine Hill CDP, California – Racial and ethnic composition Note: the US Census treats Hispanic/Latino as an ethnic category. This table excludes Latinos from the racial categories and assigns them to a separate category. Hispanics/Latinos may be of any race.
Race / Ethnicity (NH = Non-Hispanic)	Pop 2000	Pop 2010	Pop 2020	% 2000	% 2010	% 2020
White alone (NH)	2,122	2,058	1,954	65.09%	54.72%	45.20%
Black or African American alone (NH)	70	107	140	2.15%	2.84%	3.24%
Native American or Alaska Native alone (NH)	31	28	26	0.95%	0.74%	0.60%
Asian alone (NH)	73	190	473	2.24%	5.05%	10.94%
Native Hawaiian or Pacific Islander alone (NH)	4	32	27	0.12%	0.85%	0.62%
Other race alone (NH)	4	12	50	0.12%	0.32%	1.16%
Mixed race or Multiracial (NH)	169	165	318	5.18%	4.39%	7.36%
Hispanic or Latino (any race)	787	1,169	1,335	24.14%	31.08%	30.88%
Total	3,260	3,761	4,323	100.00%	100.00%	100.00%

=== 2020 census ===
As of the 2020 census, Vine Hill had a population of 4,323. The population density was 2,878.2 inhabitants per square mile (1,111.3/km^{2}).

The census reported that 99.5% of the population lived in households and 0.5% lived in non-institutionalized group quarters. 100.0% of residents lived in urban areas, while 0.0% lived in rural areas.

There were 1,469 households, out of which 39.1% included children under the age of 18, 52.4% were married-couple households, 8.4% were cohabiting couple households, 24.0% had a female householder with no spouse or partner present, and 15.2% had a male householder with no spouse or partner present. 17.7% of households were one person, and 6.6% were one person aged 65 or older. The average household size was 2.93. There were 1,085 families (73.9% of all households).

The age distribution was 23.8% under the age of 18, 7.6% aged 18 to 24, 31.3% aged 25 to 44, 24.9% aged 45 to 64, and 12.4% who were 65 years of age or older. The median age was 37.7 years. For every 100 females, there were 99.7 males. For every 100 females age 18 and over, there were 96.8 males age 18 and over.

There were 1,511 housing units at an average density of 1,006.0 units per square mile (388.4 units/km^{2}), of which 1,469 (97.2%) were occupied. Of these, 70.6% were owner-occupied, and 29.4% were occupied by renters. Of all housing units, 2.8% were vacant; the homeowner vacancy rate was 0.7% and the rental vacancy rate was 2.9%.

=== Income and poverty ===
In 2023, the US Census Bureau estimated that the median household income was $124,528, and the per capita income was $55,936.

== Education ==
Most of Vine Hill is in the Martinez Unified School District, while a portion is in the Mount Diablo Unified School District.
