= Clyde, California =

Clyde
- Unincorporated Community; Census Designated Place
- Location in Contra Costa County and the state of California

- Location in the United States Clyde (California)
- Coordinates: 38°01′32″N 122°01′46″W
- Country: United States
- State: California
- County: Contra Costa

Government
  - State Senate: Tim Grayson (D)
  - State Assembly: Anamarie Avila Farias (D)
  - U. S. Congress: Mark DeSaulnier (D)

Area
  - Total: 0.14 sq mi (0.36 km^{2})
  - Land: 0.14 sq mi (0.36 km^{2})
  - Water: 0 sq mi (0.00 km^{2}) 0%
- Elevation: 23 ft (7.0 m)

Population (2020)
  - Total: 729
  - Density: 5,180.2/sq mi (2,000.09/km^{2})
- Time zone: UTC-8 (PST)
  - Summer (DST): UTC-7 (PDT)
- ZIP code: 94520
- Area code: 925
- FIPS code: 06-14232
- GNIS feature IDs: 1658292, 2407641

Clyde is a census-designated place (CDP) in Contra Costa County, California, United States. The population was 729 at the 2020 census. It is located six miles (10 kilometres) east of Martinez.

== History ==
In 1917, the United States Shipping Board provided a government loan to the Pacific Coast Shipbuilding Company to build a company town. The board commissioned Bernard Maybeck to be supervising architect for laying out the new town. He designed the hotel and around 200 of the initial homes built in the town. George Applegarth was hired as acting architect. In this position, he drew many of the architectural plans for the town.

== Geography ==
According to the United States Census Bureau, the CDP has a total area of 0.14 square miles (0.36 square kilometres), all land.

== Demographics ==
Historical population
Census	Pop.	Note	%±
2000	694		—
2010	678		−2.3%
2020	729		7.5%
U.S. Decennial Census; 1850–1870 1880-1890; 1900 1910 1920; 1930 1940 1950; 1960 1970 1980; 1990 2000 2010

Clyde first appeared as a census designated place in the 2000 U.S. census.

=== Racial and ethnic composition ===
Clyde CDP, California – Racial and ethnic composition Note: the US Census treats Hispanic/Latino as an ethnic category. This table excludes Latinos from the racial categories and assigns them to a separate category. Hispanics/Latinos may be of any race.
Race / Ethnicity (NH = Non-Hispanic)	Pop 2000	Pop 2010	Pop 2020	% 2000	% 2010	% 2020
White alone (NH)	530	471	400	76.37%	69.47%	54.87%
Black or African American alone (NH)	4	10	33	0.58%	1.47%	4.53%
Native American or Alaska Native alone (NH)	2	4	3	0.29%	0.59%	0.41%
Asian alone (NH)	42	58	73	6.05%	8.55%	10.01%
Native Hawaiian or Pacific Islander alone (NH)	2	3	1	0.29%	0.44%	0.14%
Other race alone (NH)	1	0	5	0.14%	0.00%	0.69%
Mixed race or Multiracial (NH)	34	33	70	4.90%	4.87%	9.60%
Hispanic or Latino (any race)	79	99	144	11.38%	14.60%	19.75%
Total	694	678	729	100.00%	100.00%	100.00%

=== 2020 census ===
As of the 2020 census, Clyde had a population of 729. The population density was 5,170.2 inhabitants per square mile (1,996.2/km^{2}). The median age was 42.5 years. 16.7% of residents were under the age of 18 and 16.3% of residents were 65 years of age or older. For every 100 females there were 94.9 males, and for every 100 females age 18 and over there were 95.2 males age 18 and over.

100.0% of residents lived in urban areas, while 0.0% lived in rural areas.

There were 288 households and 194 families in Clyde, of which 24.7% had children under the age of 18 living in them. Of all households, 44.4% were married-couple households, 21.9% were households with a male householder and no spouse or partner present, and 26.7% were households with a female householder and no spouse or partner present. About 24.7% of all households were made up of individuals and 7.3% had someone living alone who was 65 years of age or older.

There were 291 housing units, of which 1.0% were vacant. The homeowner vacancy rate was 0.0% and the rental vacancy rate was 0.0%.

== Education ==
Clyde is served by the Mount Diablo Unified School District. All High School students should go to Mount Diablo High School.
