= Pleasant Hill School (Lineville, Iowa) =

- U.S. National Register of Historic Places
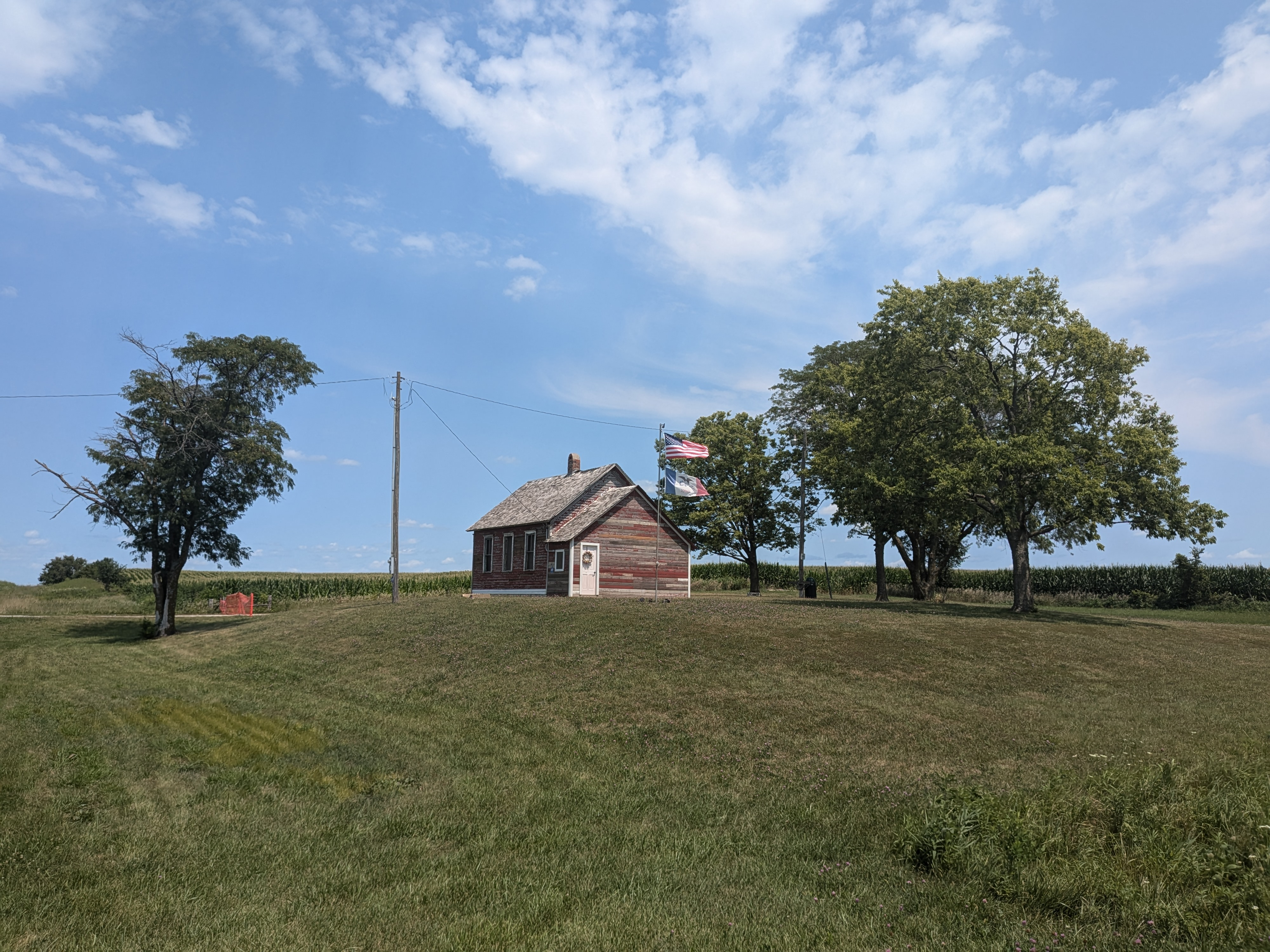
- Little Red Schoolhouse in 2024

- Location within Iowa Location within the United States
- Location: 3 miles north of Lineville on U.S. Route 65
- Coordinates: 40°37′28″N 93°29′56″W
- Area: less than one acre
- Built: 1881
- NRHP reference No.: 75000701
- Added to NRHP: May 28, 1975

The Pleasant Hill School, also known as the Little Red School House, is a historic building located north of Lineville in rural Wayne County, Iowa, United States. It was built in 1881 on land that had been purchased for educational purposes in 1873, and it housed a one-room school until 1958. The Grand River Independent School District donated the school building to the Wayne County Historical Society. They maintain it as it was when it served as a schoolhouse. The interior furnishings are authentic, if not original to the building. The school yard is maintained as a roadside park along U.S. 65. The building follows a rectangular plan that is three bays long and two bays wide. It is capped with a gable roof. A small entryway is located on the south side of the structure. The school building was listed on the National Register of Historic Places in 1975.
