= Travis Raciti =

American football player (born 1992)

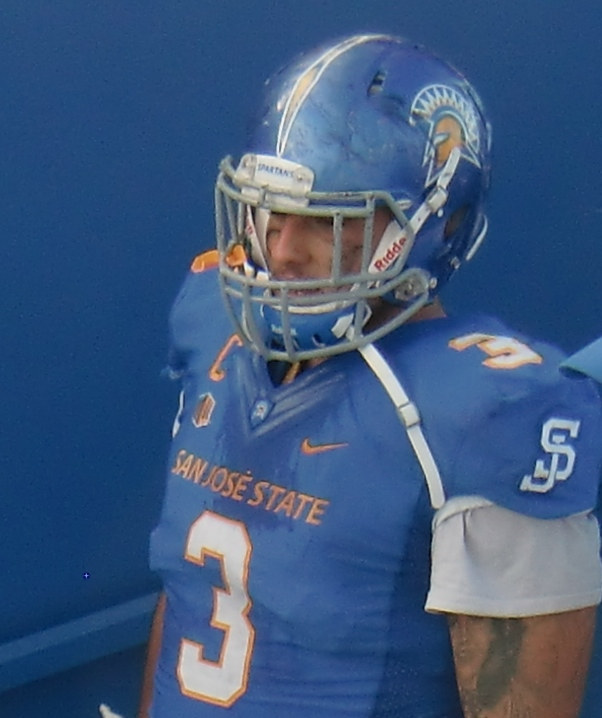
- Raciti with San Jose State

No. 78
- Position: Defensive end

Personal information
- Born: May 21, 1992 (age 34); Antioch, California, U.S.
- Listed height: 6 ft 4 in (1.93 m)
- Listed weight: 305 lb (138 kg)

Career information
- High school: Pleasant Hill (CA) College Park
- College: San Jose State
- NFL draft: 2015: undrafted

Career history
- Philadelphia Eagles (2015–2016)*; Minnesota Vikings (2016)*; Denver Broncos (2016–2017)*
- * Offseason or practice squad member only

Awards and highlights
- First-team All-WAC (2012); Second-team All-MWC (2014)
- Stats at Pro Football Reference

Travis Santo Raciti (born May 21, 1992) is an American former professional football defensive end. He played college football at San Jose State and was signed by the Philadelphia Eagles as an undrafted free agent in 2015.

== Early life and college playing career ==
Raciti was born in Antioch, California and graduated from College Park High School in nearby Pleasant Hill in 2010. At College Park, Raciti lettered in football. On the football team, Raciti was the long snapper in addition to five other positions, including tight end and defensive tackle. He was a second-team all-state selection in 2009.

College recruiting
Name	Hometown	School	Height	Weight	Commit date
Travis Raciti; DE	Pleasant Hill, CA	College Park HS	6 ft 4 in (1.93 m)	255 lb (116 kg)	Jan 17, 2010
Travis Raciti; DE	Recruit ratings: Scout: Rivals: 247Sports: ESPN: (69)				
Overall recruit ranking: Scout: 113 (TE), 12 (CA TE), 76 (school) 247Sports: 217 (CA) ESPN: 90 (TE), 241 (CA)
Note: In many cases, Scout, Rivals, 247Sports, On3, and ESPN may conflict in their listings of height and weight.; In these cases, the average was taken. ESPN grades are on a 100-point scale.; Sources: "2010 San Jose St. Football Commitment List". Rivals.; "2010 San Jose State Football Recruiting". Scout.; "San José State Spartans 2010 Player Commits". ESPN.; "Scout.com Team Recruiting Rankings". Scout.; "2010 Team Ranking". Rivals.com.; "San Jose State 2010 Football Commits". 247Sports.

Raciti was recruited as a tight end and defensive end prospect in Mike MacIntyre's first recruiting class at San Jose State University. After redshirting the 2010 season, Raciti immediately joined the starting defensive lineup. In 12 games in 2011, Raciti started 9 and had 26 tackles, 3.5 tackles for loss, and one quarterback sack. He also recovered two fumbles, and both recoveries led to offensive scoring afterwards.

In 2012, the season San Jose State won the Military Bowl, Raciti started all 13 games and had 52 tackles, 13.0 tackles for loss, and 8.5 sacks. Raciti earned first-team All-Western Athletic Conference honors.

As a junior in 2013, Raciti started 11 of 12 games. He led all linemen on the team, with 37 tackles, 4.0 tackles for loss, and 2.0 sacks. He also blocked two extra point kicks.

Raciti, a three-time academic all-conference honoree (WAC in 2011 and 2012, MWC in 2013), completed his bachelor's degree in communication studies in May 2014. Along with future NFL draft pick Akeem King, Raciti was one of eight graduate students on the 2014 San Jose State team. Raciti started all 12 games of his senior season in 2014. With 72 tackles on the season, Raciti had the most tackles among all Mountain West Conference (MWC) defensive linemen. He also led San Jose State in tackles for loss (6.5) and sacks (3.0), defended one pass, and forced a fumble. Raciti was a second-team All-MWC selection.

== Professional career ==
Pre-draft measurables
Height	Weight	40-yard dash	10-yard split	20-yard split	20-yard shuttle	Three-cone drill	Vertical jump	Broad jump	Bench press
6 ft 5 in (1.96 m)	285 lb (129 kg)	5.06 s	1.78 s	2.94 s	4.66 s	7.52 s	31.5 in (0.80 m)	8 ft 10 in (2.69 m)	28 reps
Measurables were taken at Pro Day.

=== Philadelphia Eagles ===
Raciti signed as an undrafted free agent with the Philadelphia Eagles on May 2, 2015. He was released on September 5, 2015, and was signed to the Eagles practice squad on September 15, 2015. He signed a reserve/future contract with the Eagles on January 4, 2016, but was released on May 5, 2016.

=== Minnesota Vikings ===
Raciti was signed by the Minnesota Vikings on May 23, 2016. On September 3, 2016, he was released by the Vikings as part of final roster cuts.

=== Denver Broncos ===
On December 8, 2016, Raciti was signed to the Denver Broncos' practice squad. He signed a reserve/future contract with the Broncos on January 2, 2017. On April 5, 2017, he was waived by the Broncos.
