= Reliez Valley, California =

Reliez Valley
- Census-designated place
- Position in California.
- Coordinates: 37°56′24″N 122°06′10″W
- Country: United States
- State: California
- County: Contra Costa

Area
  - Total: 2.360 sq mi (6.113 km^{2})
  - Land: 2.360 sq mi (6.113 km^{2})
  - Water: 0 sq mi (0 km^{2}) 0%
- Elevation: 299 ft (91 m)

Population (2020)
  - Total: 3,354
  - Density: 1,421/sq mi (548.7/km^{2})
- Time zone: UTC-8 (Pacific (PST))
  - Summer (DST): UTC-7 (PDT)
- GNIS feature ID: 2583120

Reliez Valley is a census-designated place in Contra Costa County, California, United States. Reliez Valley sits at an elevation of 299 feet (91 m). The 2020 United States census reported Reliez Valley's population as 3,354.

== Geography ==
According to the United States Census Bureau, the CDP has a total area of 2.360 square miles (6.113 km^{2}), all land.

== Demographics ==
Historical population
| Census | Pop. | Note | %± |
|---|---|---|---|
| 2010 | 3,101 | | — |
| 2020 | 3,354 | | 8.2% |
U.S. Decennial Census; 2010

=== 2020 census ===
As of the 2020 census, Reliez Valley had a population of 3,354 and a population density of 1,421.2 inhabitants per square mile (548.7/km^{2}). The median age was 51.0 years. 19.9% of residents were under the age of 18 and 27.8% were 65 years of age or older. For every 100 females, there were 95.6 males, and for every 100 females age 18 and over, there were 90.7 males.

The census reported that 98.8% of the population lived in households, 1.1% lived in non-institutionalized group quarters, and 0.1% were institutionalized. In addition, 100.0% of residents lived in urban areas and 0.0% lived in rural areas.

There were 1,251 households, out of which 28.1% had children under the age of 18. Of all households, 67.3% were married-couple households, 2.7% were cohabiting couple households, 19.7% had a female householder with no partner present, and 10.2% had a male householder with no partner present. About 20.6% of households were one person, and 14.5% were one person aged 65 or older. The average household size was 2.65. There were 955 families (76.3% of all households).

There were 1,336 housing units at an average density of 566.1 units per square mile (218.6 units/km^{2}). Of these, 1,251 (93.6%) were occupied and 6.4% were vacant. Of occupied units, 85.5% were owner-occupied and 14.5% were renter-occupied. The homeowner vacancy rate was 1.2%, and the rental vacancy rate was 16.8%.

Racial composition as of the 2020 census
| Race | Number | Percent |
|---|---|---|
| White | 2,449 | 73.0% |
| Black or African American | 62 | 1.8% |
| American Indian and Alaska Native | 6 | 0.2% |
| Asian | 393 | 11.7% |
| Native Hawaiian and Other Pacific Islander | 8 | 0.2% |
| Some other race | 58 | 1.7% |
| Two or more races | 378 | 11.3% |
| Hispanic or Latino (of any race) | 271 | 8.1% |

=== 2010 census ===
Reliez Valley first appeared as a census designated place in the 2010 U.S. census.

== Education ==
Much of Reliez Valley is in the Lafayette Elementary School District and the Acalanes Union High School District. Other parts are in K-12 districts: some in Martinez Unified School District and some in Mount Diablo Unified School District.
