= Acalanes Union High School District =

School district in California

Acalanes School District

Location
- Southwest/Central Contra Costa County, California United States

District information
- Type: Public
- Grades: 9-12
- Superintendent: John Nickerson
- Accreditation: Western Association of Schools and Colleges
- Schools: Acalanes High School, Campolindo High School, Las Lomas High School, Miramonte High School, Acalanes Center for Independent Study, Acalanes Adult Education
- NCES District ID: 0601650

Students and staff
- Students: 5,589
- Teachers: 301
- Staff: 167

Other information
- Website: www.acalanes.k12.ca.us

Acalanes Union High School District is a public high school district in Contra Costa County, located in the Bay Area of California. The district takes its name from Rancho Acalanes, an 1834 Mexican rancho grant which occupied much of the area from Orinda to Lafayette. The district operates four high schools.

== Schools ==
It currently has five schools: Acalanes High School in Lafayette, Campolindo High School in Moraga, Las Lomas High School in Walnut Creek, Miramonte High School in Orinda, and The Acalanes Center for Independent Study in Walnut Creek. A fifth campus, Del Valle High School located in Walnut Creek was closed at the end of the 1978–1979 school year and remaining students were transferred to Acalanes, Campolindo, and Las Lomas High Schools. The district's alternative school, Del Oro High School, opened on the former site of Del Valle High School, closed following the 2009–2010 school year, although the district still operates Acalanes Adult Education at the Del Valle Education Center in Walnut Creek. As of 2023, Del Valle is also operational as The Acalanes Center for Independent Study. John Nickerson has served as the district's Superintendent since May, 2011.

In 2004, the Acalanes Union High School district was ranked the second highest in the state of California, behind only Los Gatos/Saratoga (LGJUHSD) in Los Gatos.

In 2007, the Acalanes Union High School district was ranked the number one district in the state of California based on the STAR Test scores.

== Boundary ==
The district includes Acalanes Ridge, Castle Hill, Lafayette, Moraga, Orinda, San Miguel, and Saranap. It also includes much of Contra Costa Centre, Shell Ridge, and Walnut Creek, and portions of Alamo and Reliez Valley.

== Staffing ==
The district employed 167 classified employees in the 10/11 school year. California Dataquest - AUHSD Classified Staff Report for 2010/2011

The district employed 301 teachers in the 09/10 school year, a third of which have graduate degrees. California Dataquest - Staff Education Report

== Enrollment ==
Total enrollment in the district in the 10/11 school year was 5,589. Enrollment in the 10/11 school year by grade is as follows:

- 9th Grade - 1,367
- 10th Grade - 1,430
- 11th Grade - 1,358
- 12th Grade - 1,417

California Dataquest - District Enrollment by Grade Report
