= Mount Diablo Unified School District =

School district in California

- 1936 Carlotta Dr. Concord, Contra Costa County, California, 94519

District information
- Type: Public
- Established: 1948
- Superintendent: Adam Clark

Other information
- Website: http://www.mdusd.org/

Mount Diablo Unified School District (MDUSD) is a public school district in Contra Costa County, California. It currently operates 29 elementary schools, 9 middle schools, and 5 high schools, with 7 alternative school programs and an adult education program. MDUSD is one of the largest school districts in the state of California, with over 56 school sites and a budget of approximately $270,000,000. The district has over 36,000 K-12 students, over 20,000 adult education students, and over 3,500 employees, including over 2,000 certificated educators. The district covers 150 square miles (390 km^{2}), including the cities of Concord and Clayton; as well as most of Pleasant Hill and portions of Walnut Creek, Pittsburg, Lafayette, and Martinez; and unincorporated areas, including Pacheco, Clyde, and Bay Point.

== Superintendent and Board ==
The current district superintendent is Adam Clark, Ed.D.

The current members of the Board of Education are:

- Linda Mayo, President (Term expires 2026)
- Cherise Khaund, Vice President (Term expires 2026)
- Debra Mason (Term expires 2026)
- Joanne Durkey (Term expires 2020)
- Keisha Nzewi (Term expires 2028)

== Boundary ==
In addition to Concord, the district includes: Clayton, Clyde, North Gate, Pacheco, and Pleasant Hill. It also includes the majority of Bay Point, and sections of Contra Costa Centre, Martinez, Pittsburg, Reliez Valley, Shell Ridge, Vine Hill, and Walnut Creek.

== Demographics ==
Approximately 36,000 students are enrolled at MDUSD. The racial makeup of MDUSD's students is 55.0% Non-Hispanic white, 26.7% Hispanic, 7.8% Asian, 5.2% African American, 3.7% Filipino, 1.1% Pacific Islander, and 0.5% Native American.

== Schools and Programs ==
=== Elementary schools ===
- Ayers
- Bancroft
- Bel Air
- Cambridge
- Cornerstone
- Delta View
- El Monte
- Fair Oaks
- Gregory Gardens
- Hidden Valley
- Highlands
- Holbrook
- Meadow Homes
- Monte Gardens (magnet school)
- Mt. Diablo
- Mountain View
- Pleasant Hill
- Rio Vista
- Sequoia
- Shore Acres
- Silverwood
- Strandwood
- Sun Terrace
- Sunrise
- Valhalla
- Valle Verde
- Walnut Acres
- Westwood
- Woodside
- Wren Avenue
- Ygnacio Valley

=== Middle schools ===
- Diablo View
- El Dorado
- Foothill
- Oak Grove
- Pine Hollow
- Pleasant Hill
- Riverview
- Sequoia (magnet school)
- Valley View

=== High schools ===
Aerial view of College Park High School

- College Park
- Concord
- Mt. Diablo
- Northgate
- Ygnacio Valley

Clayton Valley High School operated as an MDUSD school from 1958 to 2012. In 2012 it was converted to a charter school and is no longer part of the MDUSD.

Pacifica High School operated from 1955 until 1976 when it was closed. The campus was then re-opened as Riverview Middle School.

Pleasant Hill High School operated from 1953 until 1980 when it was closed. The campus later re-opened as Pleasant Hill Middle School.

=== Alternative schools ===
- Alliance Program - Mental Health Collaborative
- Crossroads NSHS (necessary small high school)
- Diablo Day School
- Foster Youth Services - service, not a school
- Gateway NSHS
- Home and Hospital - program, not a school
- Horizons: CIS (Center for Independent Study) - program, not a school
- Horizons: Home Study - program, not a school
- Nueva Vista NSHS
- Olympic High (continuation high school)
- Prospect NSHS
- Robert Shearer - pre-school
- Shadelands - pre-school
- Summit NSHS
- Transitional Learning Center (TLC)
- Work Experience Education

=== Adult education program ===
- Mt. Diablo Adult Education

== History ==
The earliest schools in the area were grammar schools, each independently founded after the Civil War. The first school in Concord, for example, was a two-story building constructed in 1870 at the corner of Grant and Bonifacio streets; this was replaced by an even larger school on Willow Pass Road in 1892.

MDUSD was formed in 1948 from the Mount Diablo Union High School District and the local grammar schools.
