= Lafayette School District =

Public school district in Contra Costa County, California, United States

Address
- 3477 School Street Lafayette, California, 94549; United States

District information
- Type: Public
- Grades: K–8
- NCES District ID: 0620310

Students and staff
- Students: 3,261
- Teachers: 156.61 (FTE)
- Staff: 136.53 (FTE)
- Student–teacher ratio: 20.82:1

Other information
- Website: www.lafsd.org

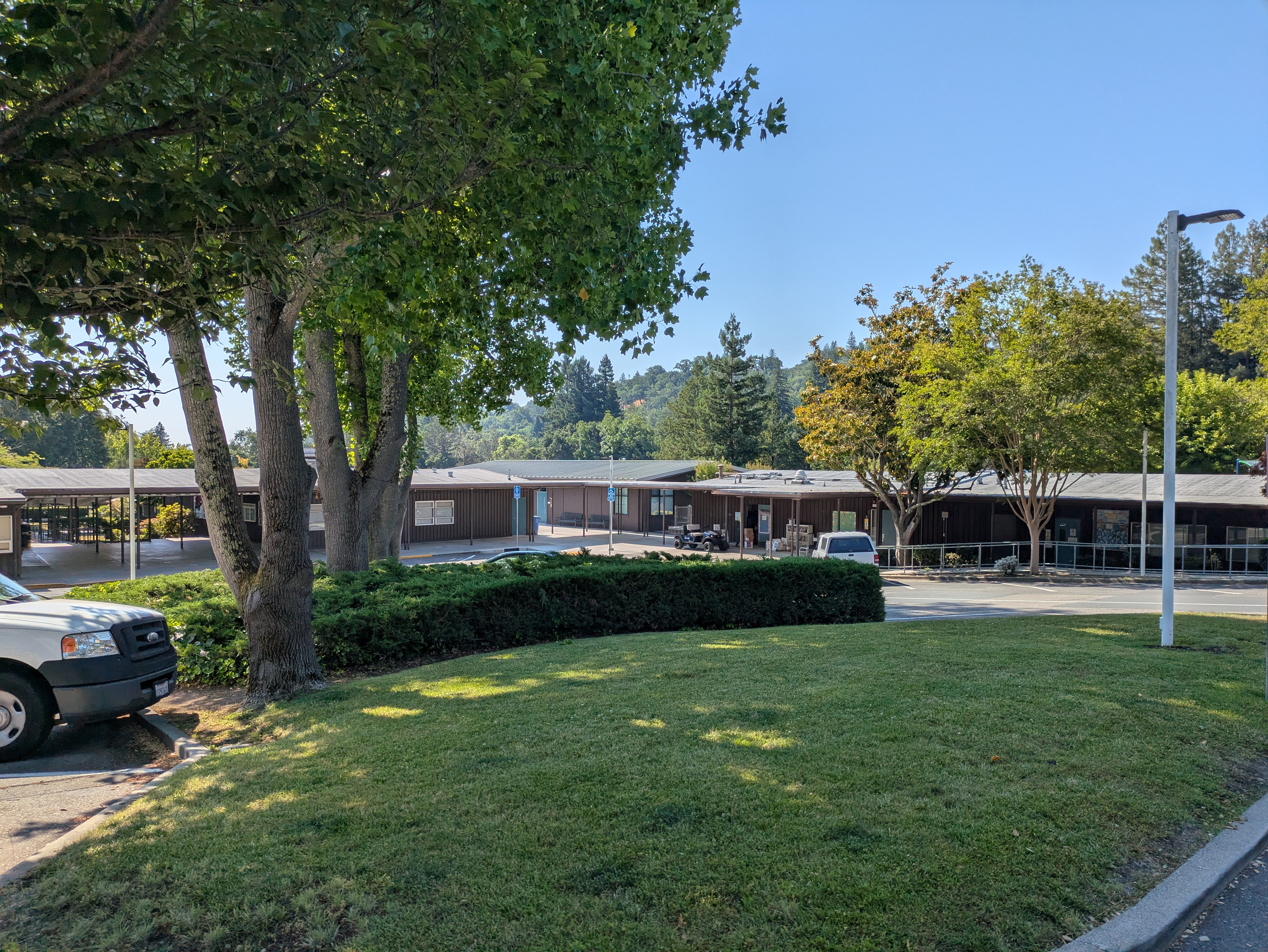
Happy Valley Elementary School

Lafayette Elementary School District is a public school district based in Contra Costa County, California, United States.

== Schools ==
=== Elementary ===
- Burton Valley Elementary
- Happy Valley Elementary
- Lafayette Elementary
- Spring Hill Elementary

=== Middle ===
- Stanley Middle School
