= Rossmoor, Walnut Creek, California =

Gated community in California

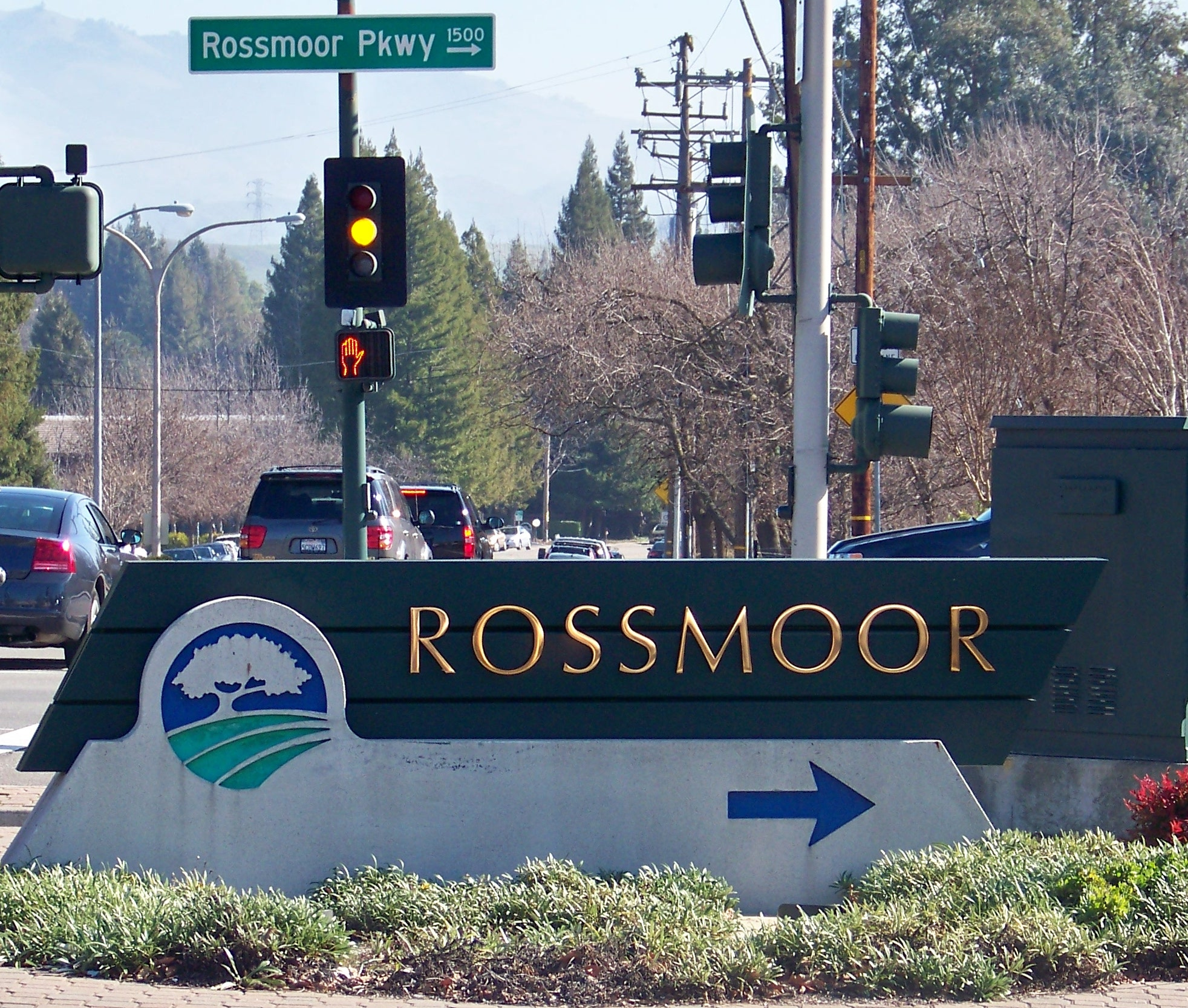

Rossmoor is a gated community in Walnut Creek, California, United States, with a population of about 9,800. It was one of the first "active adult" communities for residents 55 years or older in the San Francisco Bay Area. The 6,676 homes are made up of cooperatives, condominiums and single-family homes spread out over a valley of 1,800 acres about 45 minutes east of San Francisco.

== History ==
In the 1930s, Scottish-American industrialist Stanley Dollar constructed an estate in Tice Creek Valley near Walnut Creek in Contra Costa County, where the Dollar family bred Hereford cattle and raised show horses. The estate expanded from 1,436 acres (5.8 km^{2}) to 2,200 acres (8.9 km^{2}).

In 1960, Dollar's son, R. Stanley Dollar Jr., sold the estate to Ross W. Cortese, owner of development company Rossmoor Corporation. Cortese had previously been involved in the development of a different community also called Rossmoor in Orange County. Cortese initially planned to develop the Walnut Creek Rossmoor as a Leisure World community, but abandoned this plan shortly after breaking ground. The "Leisure World" trademark is still in use by the Cortese family, but has not been applied to Rossmoor in Walnut Creek for years.

== Community description ==
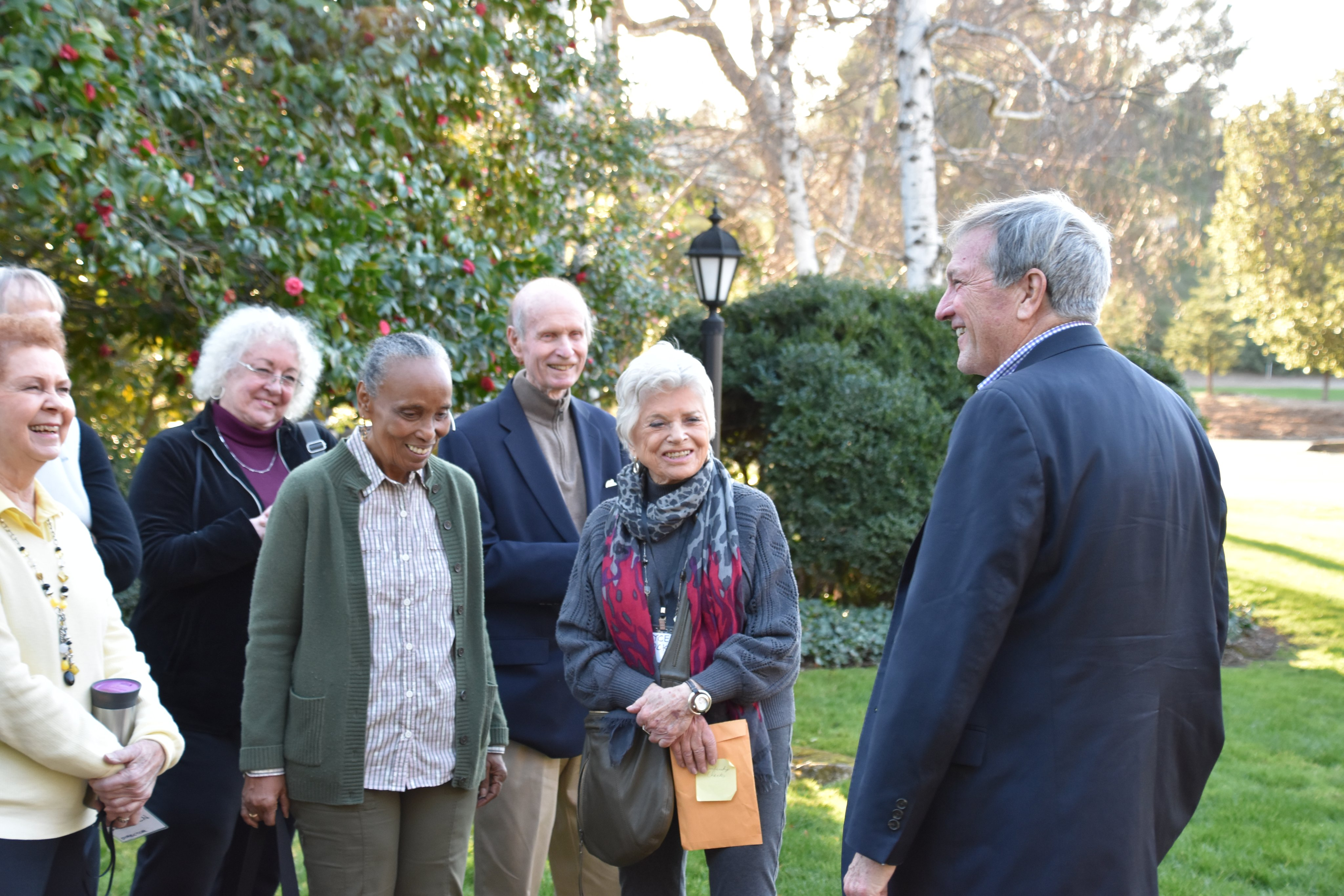
Congressman Mark DeSaulnier visiting with residents of Rossmoor in 2020.

Rossmoor Walnut Creek is a senior active adult community located in the 1,800-acre (7.3 km^{2}) Tice Valley area of Walnut Creek, California. The community is two miles (3 km) from downtown Walnut Creek, and 25 miles (40 km) from downtown San Francisco. Development of the community began in 1963 and, today, there are 6,676 residential units in three cooperatives, 19 condominium and one single-family home development (referred to as Homeowner Associations or HOAs). Forty percent of the homes are garden-style duplexes to four-plexes, and the remaining are either mid-to-high-rise, and one area of 63 individual single-family homes. Homes vary in price from mid $200,000s for some cooperatives to over $2 million for the single-family homes and $1 million for the garden style condominiums. At least one resident must be 55 years of age or older to live in a home in Rossmoor.

Amenities include two NCGA-rated golf courses (one nine-hole and one 18-hole), a large indoor pool and fitness complex, two outdoor pools, six tennis courts, lawn bowling greens, bocce courts, pickleball courts, hiking trails and table tennis facilities. The five clubhouses include the Event Center with a stage and dance floor, historic Dollar Clubhouse and Gateway Complex with movie theater; hobby studios for ceramics, sewing, lapidary, woodworking and art; a computer center and full-size library.

== Management ==
Rossmoor is managed by the Golden Rain Foundation, which is a nonprofit corporation. It has nine directors, each elected from separate districts in Rossmoor. Each director serves a three-year term, with no director serving for more than two terms.
