= Walnut Creek Elementary School District =

School district in California, United States

Address
- 960 Ygnacio Valley Road Walnut Creek, California, 94596; United States

District information
- Type: Public
- Grades: K–8
- Superintendent: Marie Morgan
- Schools: 7
- NCES District ID: 0641250

Students and staff
- Students: 3,547
- Teachers: 153.87 (FTE)
- Student–teacher ratio: 23.05:1

Other information
- Website: www.walnutcreeksd.org

Walnut Creek Elementary School District is a public school district based in Walnut Creek, California, United States. The district serves approximately 3,500 students from grades K–8.

It serves portions of Walnut Creek.

It feeds into Acalanes Union High School District.

== Schools ==
- Buena Vista Elementary School
- Indian Valley Elementary School
- Murwood Elementary School
- Parkmead Elementary School
- Tice Creek School
- Walnut Creek Intermediate School
- Walnut Heights Elementary School
