= Rancho San Ramon =

- Rancho San Ramon (Amador) land grant in Contra Costa County, California
- Rancho San Ramon (Pacheco-Castro) land grant in present-day Contra Costa County, California
