= Pedro Amador =

Pedro Amador may refer to:

- Pedro Amador (soldier) (1735–1824), Spanish soldier
- Pedro Amador (footballer) (born 1998), Portuguese football left-back
