= Alamo, California =

Unincorporated community in California, United States

- Unincorporated Community; Census Designated Place
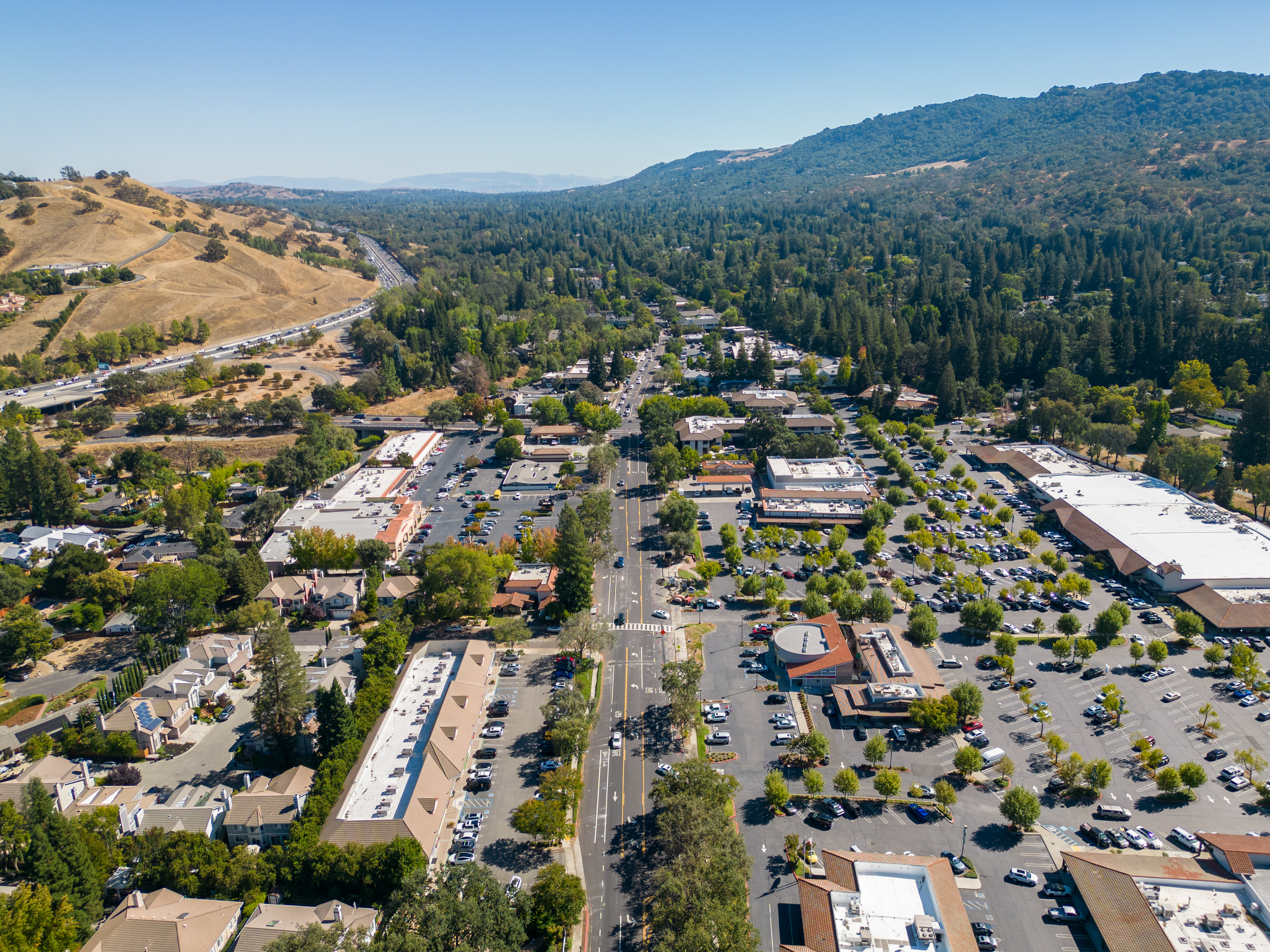
- Downtown Alamo
- Interactive map of Alamo, California
- Location in the United States
- Coordinates: 37°51′01″N 122°01′56″W
- Country: United States
- State: California
- County: Contra Costa

Government
  - State Senator: Tim Grayson (D)
  - State Assembly: Rebecca Bauer-Kahan (D)
  - U. S. Congress: Mark DeSaulnier

Area
  - Total: 9.81 sq mi (25.42 km^{2})
  - Land: 9.81 sq mi (25.42 km^{2})
  - Water: 0 sq mi (0.00 km^{2}) 0%
- Elevation: 259 ft (79 m)

Population (2020)
  - Total: 15,314
  - Density: 1,560.2/sq mi (602.38/km^{2})
- Time zone: UTC-8 (PST)
  - Summer (DST): UTC-7 (PDT)
- ZIP code: 94507
- Area code: 925
- FIPS code: 06-00618
- GNIS feature IDs: 1657900, 2407707

Alamo (Spanish: Álamo; meaning "poplar tree") is an unincorporated community and census-designated place (CDP) in Contra Costa County, California, United States. It is a suburb located in the San Francisco Bay Area's East Bay region, approximately 28 miles (45 km) east of San Francisco. Alamo is equidistant from the city of Walnut Creek and the incorporated town of Danville. As of the 2020 census, the population was 15,314.

Police services are provided by the Contra Costa County Office of the Sheriff. Fire and EMS services are provided by the San Ramon Valley Fire Protection District.

Alamo has a median household income of $385,967 (as of 2022). The average sale price of a home in Alamo is $2,698,385 (as of May 2026). In August 2007, a group of citizens launched a new initiative to incorporate the community, the latest in a series of attempts that go back to the early 1960s or before; it was defeated by referendum in March 2009. Previous failed Alamo incorporation efforts always included parts of other nearby unincorporated areas: Alamo-Danville (1964) and Alamo-Danville-San Ramon (1976).

== History ==
Alamo was first inhabited by the Tatcan Indians over 5000 years ago. The Tatcan Indians, a Bay Miwok tribe closely connected to the Saclans of Walnut Creek, lived in Alamo in the eighteenth century.

After Mission San José was founded in 1797, its grazing area stretched throughout the San Ramon Valley. The Mexican land grant Rancho San Ramon was deeded to Mariano Castro and his uncle Bartolo Pacheco in 1833. It covered modern-day Danville and Alamo. Castro owned the northern half, which included Alamo.

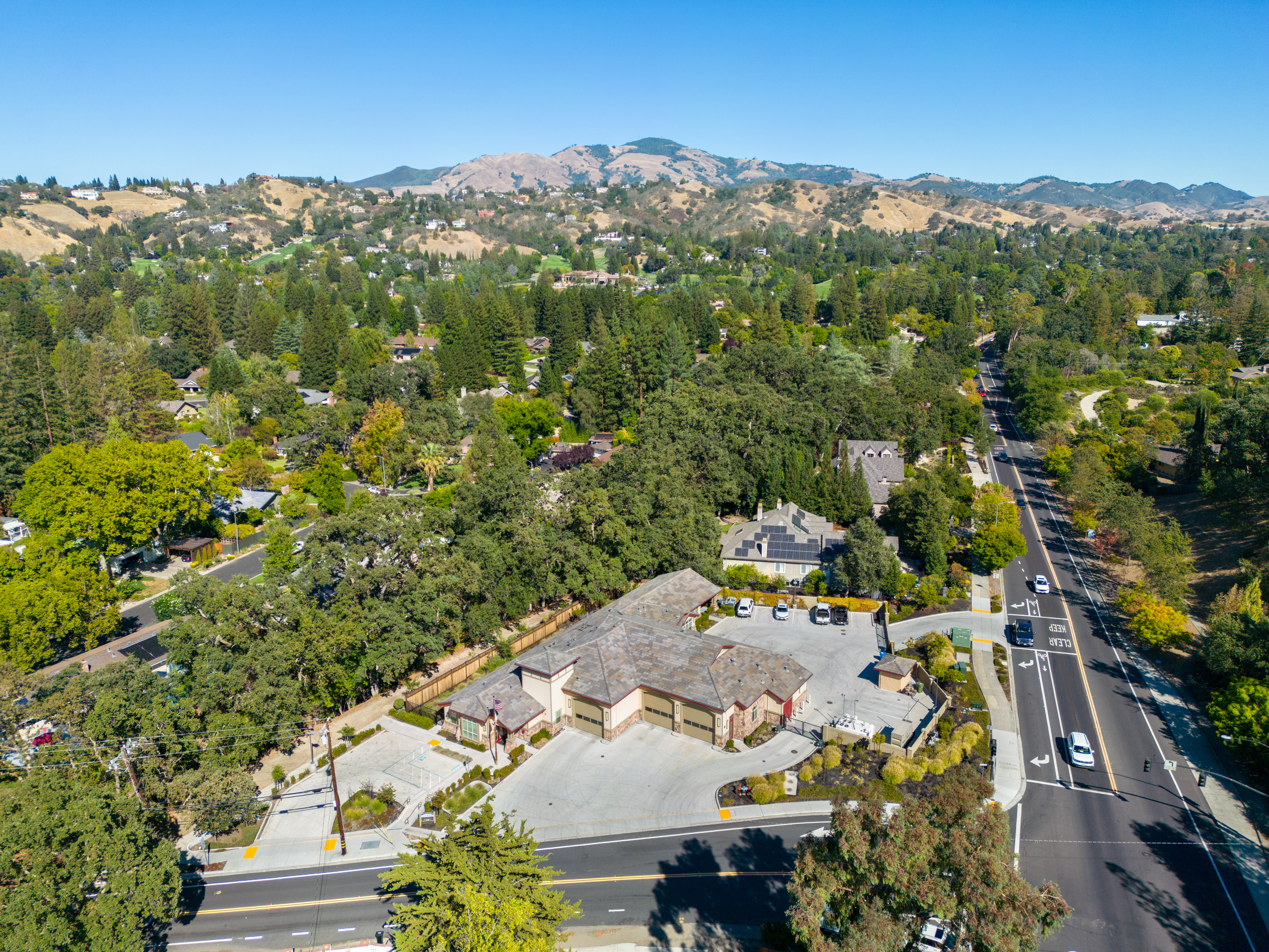
Alamo, CA looking East towards Mount Diablo.

In 1843 much of the Alamo, Las Trampas and Tice Valley areas were granted to brothers Inocencio and José Romero. It was called Rancho El Sobrante de San Ramon. Because of missing title papers, the brothers lost their ranch in American courts in 1857.

Pioneers Mary Ann and John Jones traveled through Alamo in 1847. She provided the earliest English description of the area in her diary. Her husband stopped the wagon saying, "Mary, look! Did you ever see anything so beautiful?" She wrote later:

On every side, the valley and surrounding hills were covered with thick, velvety clover, and with wild oats standing waist high waving and rippling in the summer breeze, like the bosom of a lake.

The Jones family returned to Alamo in 1851, after California had become a state. John became the first postmaster in 1852 and she applied her considerable energies to schooling children and beginning a Cumberland Presbyterian church. Other early Alamo founders included David Glass, George Engelmeyer, Silas and Susanna Stone, Captain Wall, Joshua Bollinger, and James Foster.

The area was named Alamo, which comes from the Spanish word álamo, meaning "poplar" or "cottonwood." Alamo was named after the Alamo Mission in San Antonio. Because of its location and climate, Alamo grew quickly. An early road from the redwoods near Moraga ran through Tice Valley to Alamo, since Americans preferred redwood for building materials instead of Mexican adobe brick.

The Hemme, Bollinger, Jones and Stone ranches began by grazing cattle and raising wheat and other grains. In 1891 the Hemme train station was placed near today's Hemme Avenue; later it was renamed the Alamo station.

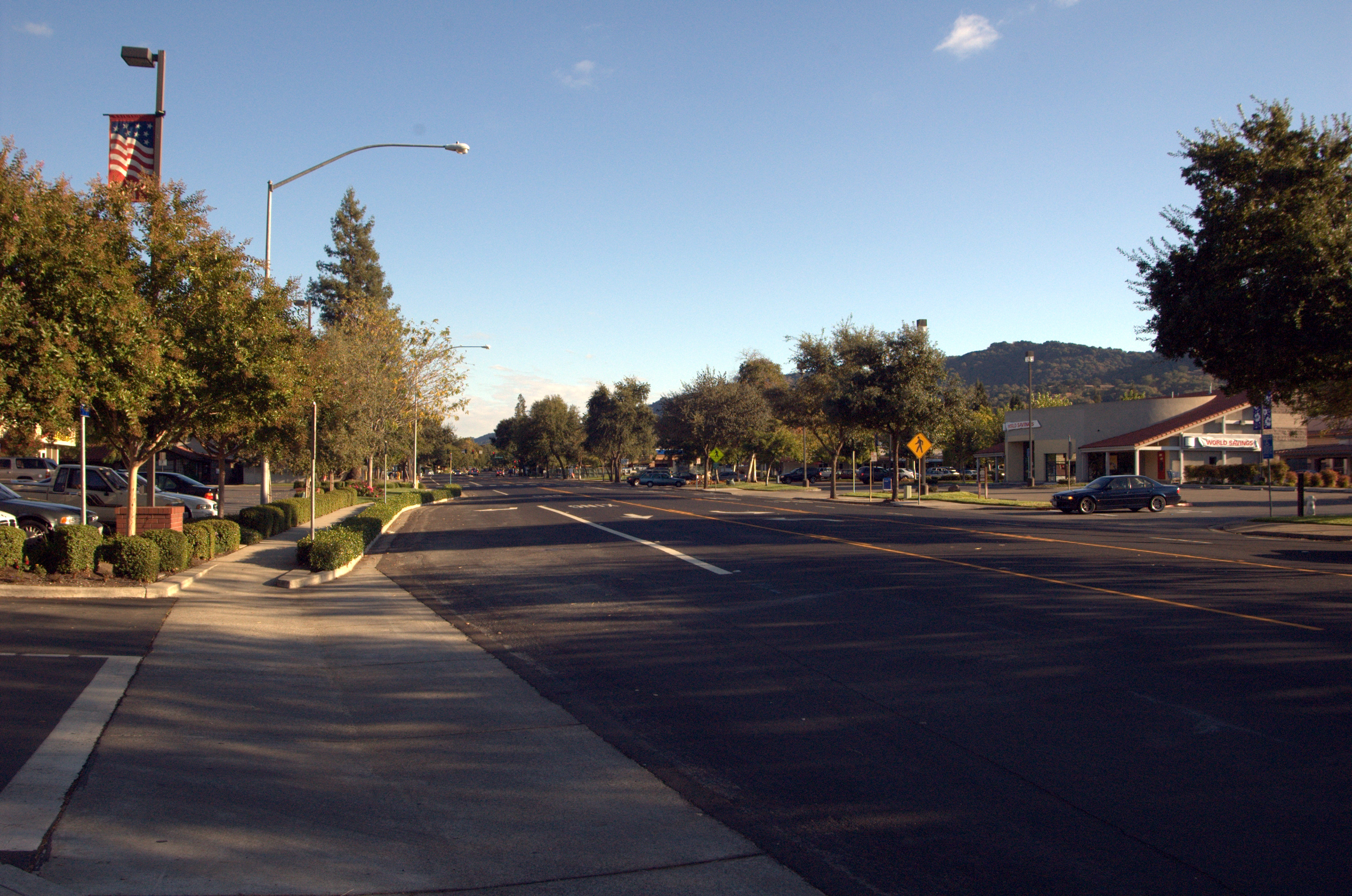
Looking south into downtown Alamo

Eventually orchards and vineyards spread across the area. Almonds, walnuts, pears, grapes and other fruit thrived in the temperate climate. In 1873, Alamo pioneer Myron Hall grafted Persian cuttings to native walnut trees and helped start the prosperous walnut industry in Contra Costa County. This "mother tree" was tended for over 100 years.

The Alamo post office is the oldest continuously operated one in the valley. It was always an important community gathering place. According to longtime postmaster Bertha Linhares, when the mail was expected the men

sat in the post office-store in the winter … the women went into our sitting room and visited with my mother … We always heard all the news and troubles of the Alamo residents.

Her father, brother and sister were also postmasters from 1905 to 1960.

== Geography ==
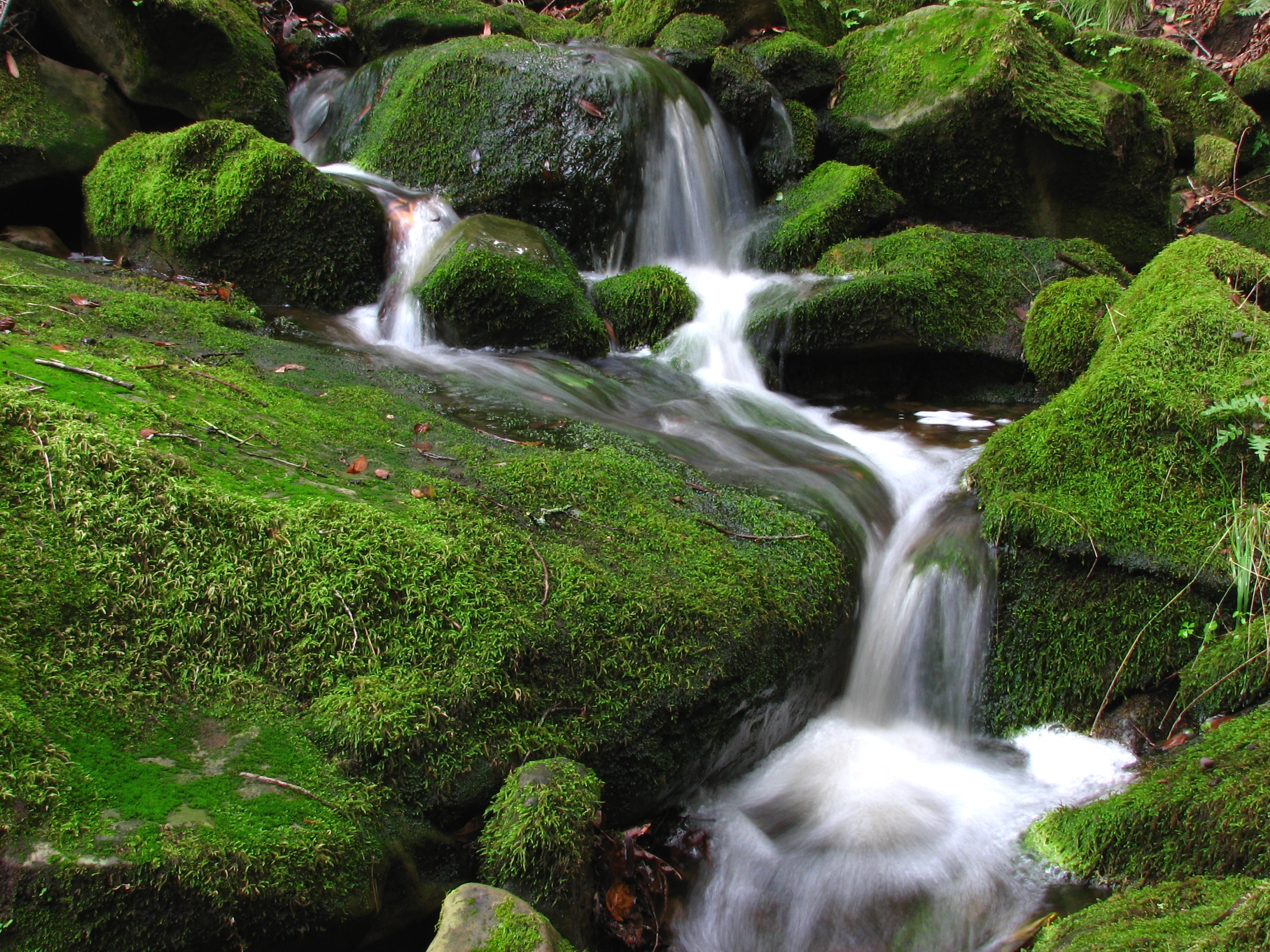
A small cascade in the Las Trampas Regional Wilderness west of Alamo

Alamo is located in Contra Costa County, at the northern end of the 20 miles (32 km)-long San Ramon Valley between two Coast Ranges − the Las Trampas Ridge to the west and the Diablo Range to the east. The city of San Ramon and the town of Danville are also located in this valley. Just to the north of Alamo lies the city of Walnut Creek. San Francisco and San Jose lie 28 miles (45 km) to the west and 46 miles (74 km) to the south, respectively. A few miles to the east of Alamo stands the 3,864 feet (1,178 m)-tall Mount Diablo.

According to the United States Census Bureau, the CDP has a total area of 9.7 square miles (25 km^{2}), all land.

=== Climate ===
Alamo experiences a warm-summer Mediterranean climate with hot, dry summers and cool, rainy winters. Summer high temperatures are hot, but due to the high degree of seasonal diurnal temperature variation, the mean temperature remains low enough to qualify as a warm-summer Mediterranean climate, staying below 71.6 °F (22.0 °C). Temperatures occasionally reach 100 °F (38 °C) or higher in the warmest months, and frost occurs on some clear mornings during the coldest months. There are, on average 42 days per annum with at least 0.1 inches (2.5 mm) of rain (days when it is considered useful to carry an umbrella). During cold winter storms, snow can fall on top of nearby Mount Diablo, but very seldom falls in the Valley.

Climate data for Alamo, California
Month	Jan	Feb	Mar	Apr	May	Jun	Jul	Aug	Sep	Oct	Nov	Dec	Year
Mean daily maximum °F (°C)	55.5 (13.1)	60.4 (15.8)	64.6 (18.1)	70.1 (21.2)	74.8 (23.8)	80.0 (26.7)	85.6 (29.8)	84.9 (29.4)	82.3 (27.9)	75.3 (24.1)	64.0 (17.8)	55.9 (13.3)	71.1 (21.7)
Daily mean °F (°C)	47.5 (8.6)	51.1 (10.6)	54.2 (12.3)	58.0 (14.4)	62.3 (16.8)	66.8 (19.3)	70.6 (21.4)	70.4 (21.3)	68.5 (20.3)	62.6 (17.0)	53.9 (12.2)	47.6 (8.7)	59.5 (15.3)
Mean daily minimum °F (°C)	39.5 (4.2)	41.8 (5.4)	43.9 (6.6)	45.9 (7.7)	49.9 (9.9)	53.5 (11.9)	55.7 (13.2)	56.0 (13.3)	54.6 (12.6)	49.9 (9.9)	43.9 (6.6)	39.4 (4.1)	47.8 (8.8)
Average precipitation inches (mm)	4.93 (125)	4.94 (125)	3.56 (90)	1.41 (36)	0.96 (24)	0.16 (4.1)	0.02 (0.51)	0.08 (2.0)	0.17 (4.3)	1.23 (31)	2.89 (73)	4.61 (117)	24.98 (634)
Source: PRISM Climate Group

=== Parks ===
==== Andrew H. Young Park ====
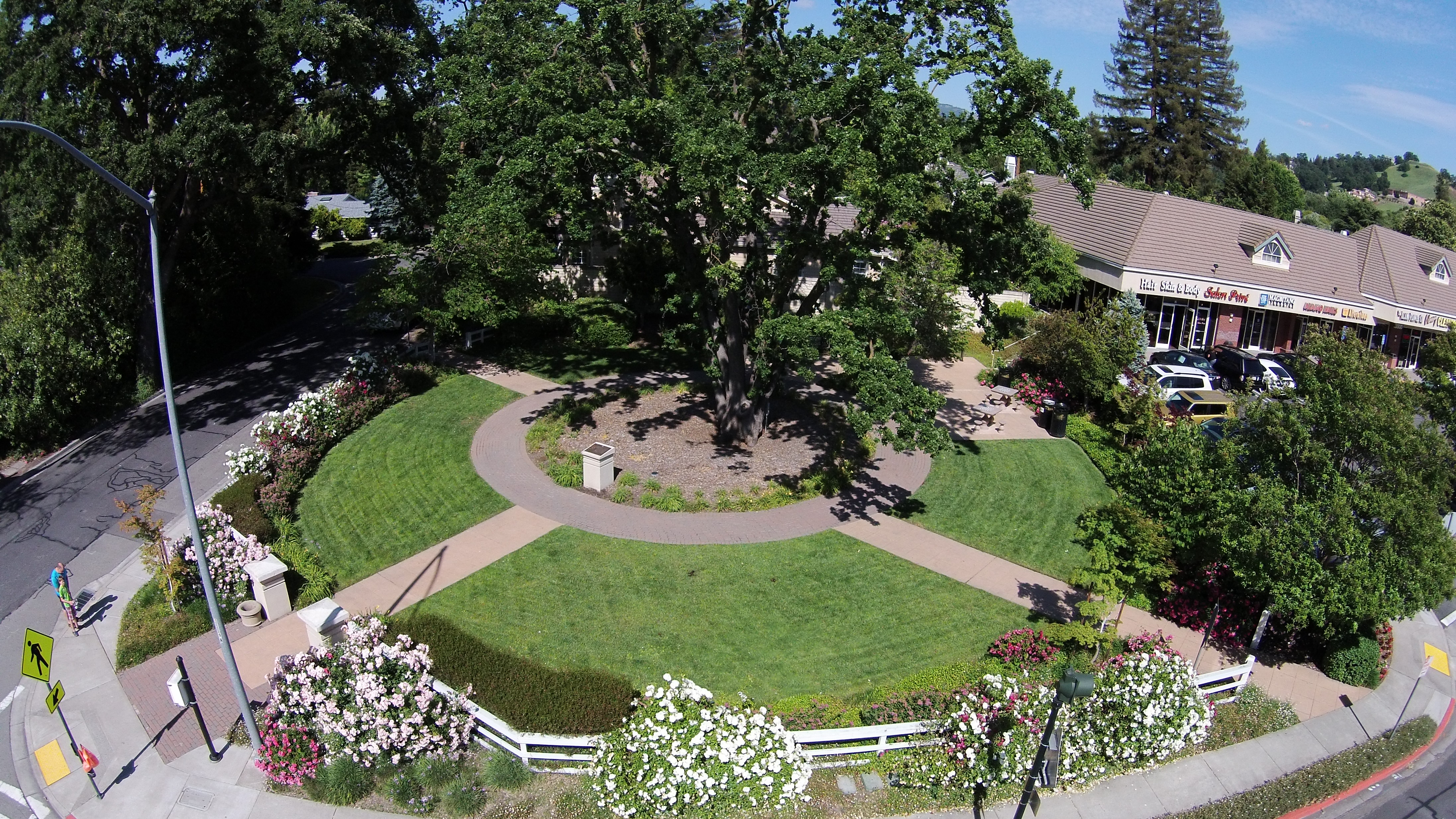
Aerial view of Andrew Young park

Located at the corner of Danville Blvd. & Jackson Way, this 1 acre park is named in memory of Alamo resident Andrew H. Young, who served as chairman of the county Planning Commission in 1980.

==== Livorna Park ====
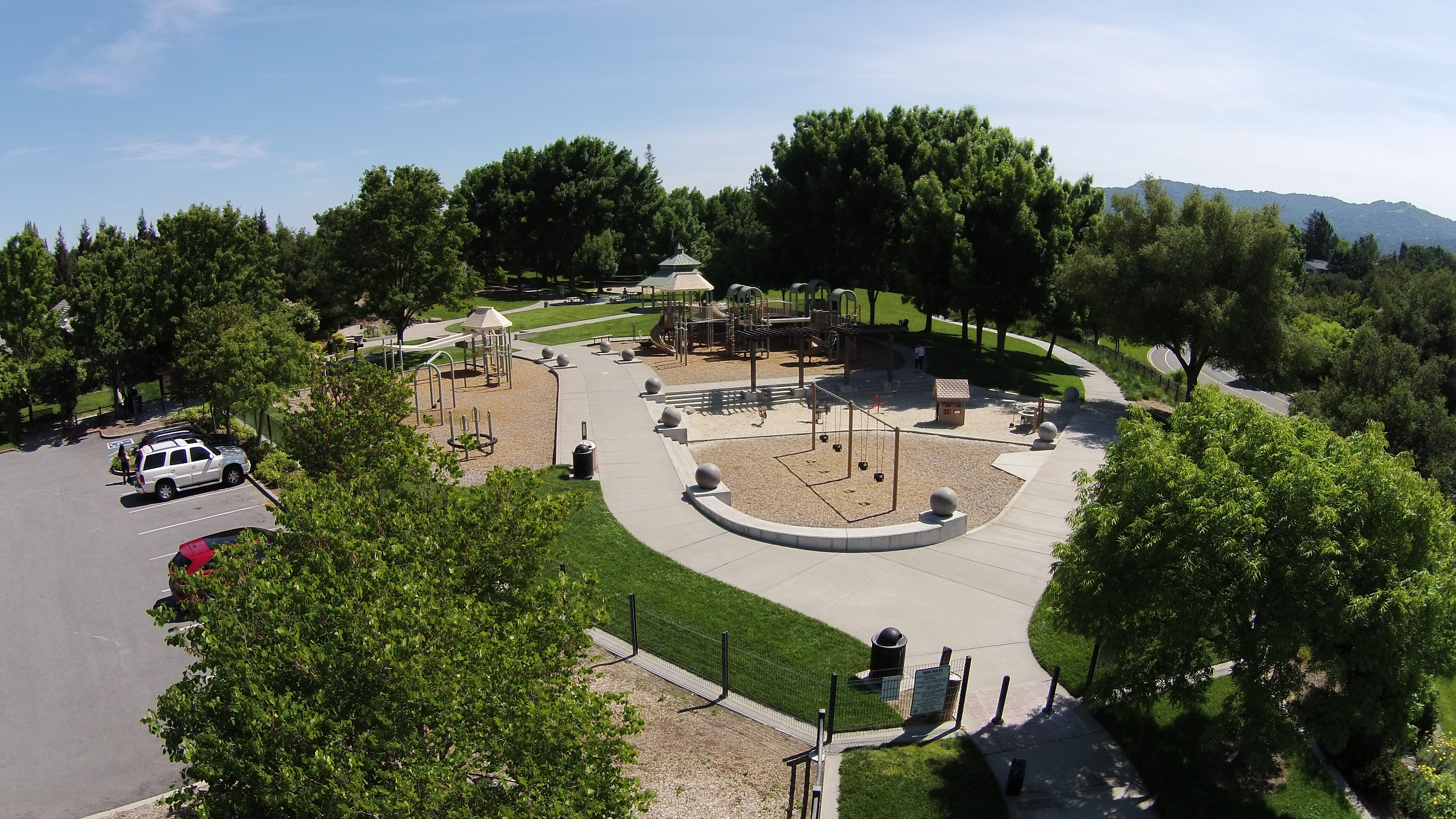
Aerial view of Livorna Park

Located at the corner of Livorna Road & Miranda Avenue, this 4.4-acre neighborhood park features a large open-air gazebo, a bocce ball court, a multi-use sports court, playground structures, large play areas, drinking fountain, restrooms, two barbecue areas, ample grassed area and off-street parking. The park typically hosts a children's Easter egg hunt each year on Easter Sunday. This is organized by the Rotary Club of Alamo.

==== Rancho Romero School Sports Field and Park ====
Located at 180 Hemme Avenue, this 5.4-acre park features soccer and softball fields, playground structures and restroom facilities. Note that it is open to the public only after normal school hours.

==== Alamo School Sports Field ====
Located at 100 Wilson Road, this 2.2-acre community park offers soccer and baseball fields, batting cages, two multi-use sport courts and a picnic area. Note that it is open to the public only after school hours.

==== Hap Magee Ranch Park ====
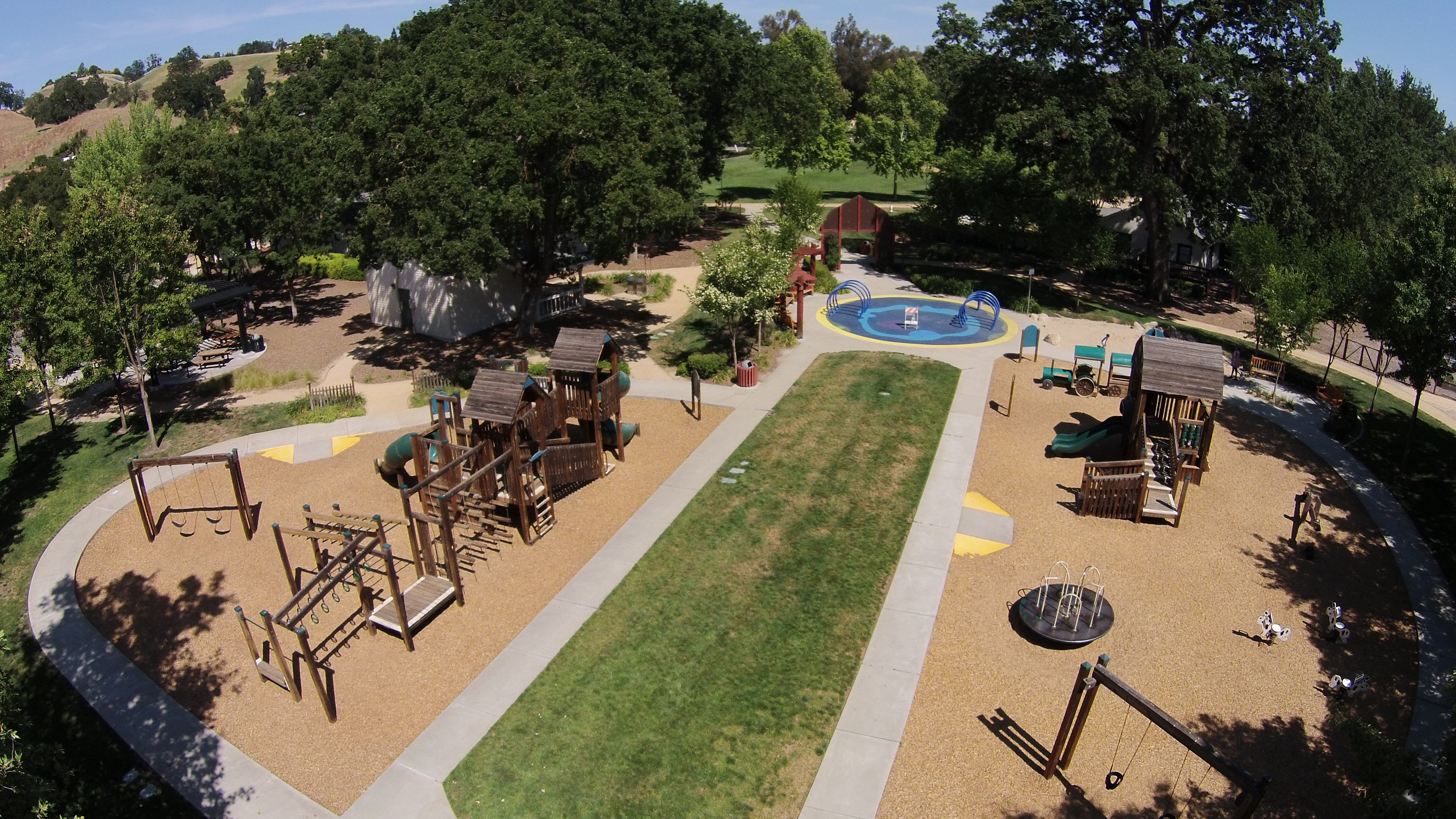
Aerial view of Hap Magee Ranch Park showing children's playground in the foreground, picnic area on the left and park area in the background

Located on the Alamo-Danville Border at 1025 La Gonda Way. This 16.3-acre park has several historic structures and is managed jointly by Alamo and Danville. A barn façade at the park entrance memorializes the park's former use as a ranch for longhorn steer with the owner being Hap Magee during the years of 1953 and 1985.

Before the cattle ranch, the site was a summer camp for San Francisco orphans, known as Camp Swain. The property was purchased in 1874 by Captain Isaac and Ann Trasker Swain on behalf of an orphanage in San Francisco. The Swains thought the children should have a warm place to go during San Francisco's damp summers. In 1911 the San Francisco Protestant Orphanage first brought their children to Camp Swain. The orphans came to the valley from 1911 to 1952, using the train and then buses. There is a drinking fountain commemorating Camp Swain with a plaque and a brick rendering of children playing.

Today there are picnic facilities, children's water play area, a large meadow with a spectacular heritage oak, dog parks and off-street parking. The park sits near the intersection of the Iron Horse Trail and the Las Trampas to Mt. Diablo Regional Trail.

==== Las Trampas Regional Wilderness ====
Las Trampas Regional Wilderness is a 5,342-acre (2,162-hectare) park located to the immediate southwest of the town. The wilderness contains numerous plant and animal communities, including forested hillsides and riparian woods.

=== Geology ===
The Mount Diablo thrust fault runs through Alamo releasing small tremors about every other month. The fault line has never had a history of being dangerous. However, the Hayward Fault, a close neighbor, is extremely active.

== Demographics ==
Historical population
Census	Pop.	Note	%±
1960	1,791		—
1980	8,505		—
1990	12,277		44.4%
2000	15,626		27.3%
2010	14,570		−6.8%
2020	15,314		5.1%
U.S. Decennial Census; 1860–1870 1880-1890; 1900 1910 1920; 1930 1940 1950; 1960 1970 1980; 1990 2000 2010; Area reported as Alamo-Danville during the 1970 census, which recorded a population of 14,059. (The two communities of Alamo and Danville were again reported separately in 1980.)

Alamo first appeared as an unincorporated place in the 1960 U.S. census; and then in the 1970 U.S. census under the name Alamo-Danville after being joined with the community of Danville (Danville had a population of 3,585 in the 1960 Census). The two communities were again separated in the 1980 United States census and redesignated as census designated places. A portion of Alamo was carved out to form the Diablo CDP prior to the 2000 U.S. census.

=== 2020 census ===
As of the 2020 census, Alamo had a population of 15,314. The population density was 1,560.1 inhabitants per square mile (602.4/km^{2}). The median age was 49.6 years. 22.2% of residents were under the age of 18 and 24.3% were 65 years of age or older. For every 100 females, there were 97.3 males, and for every 100 females age 18 and over, there were 94.4 males age 18 and over.

The Census reported that 99.6% of the population lived in households, 0.4% lived in non-institutionalized group quarters, and none were institutionalized. 100.0% of residents lived in urban areas, while 0.0% lived in rural areas.

There were 5,392 households in Alamo, of which 32.4% had children under the age of 18. Of all households, 74.2% were married-couple households, 3.4% were cohabiting couple households, 8.3% were households with a male householder and no spouse or partner present, and 14.2% were households with a female householder and no spouse or partner present. About 14.1% of all households were made up of individuals, and 9.2% had someone living alone who was 65 years of age or older. The average household size was 2.83. There were 4,457 families (82.7% of all households).

There were 5,594 housing units, of which 3.6% were vacant. The homeowner vacancy rate was 0.7% and the rental vacancy rate was 3.9%. Of the occupied housing units, 91.3% were owner-occupied and 8.7% were occupied by renters.

Racial composition as of the 2020 census
Race	Number	Percent
White	11,705	76.4%
Black or African American	122	0.8%
American Indian and Alaska Native	28	0.2%
Asian	1,801	11.8%
Native Hawaiian and Other Pacific Islander	17	0.1%
Some other race	260	1.7%
Two or more races	1,381	9.0%
Hispanic or Latino (of any race)	1,115	7.3%

=== Income and poverty ===
In 2023, the US Census Bureau estimated that the median household income in 2023 was more than $250,000, and the per capita income was $144,575. About 0.4% of families and 1.8% of the population were below the poverty line.

== Education ==
Public education in the majority of Alamo is provided by the San Ramon Valley Unified School District. There are three schools in total; two elementary schools and one middle school:

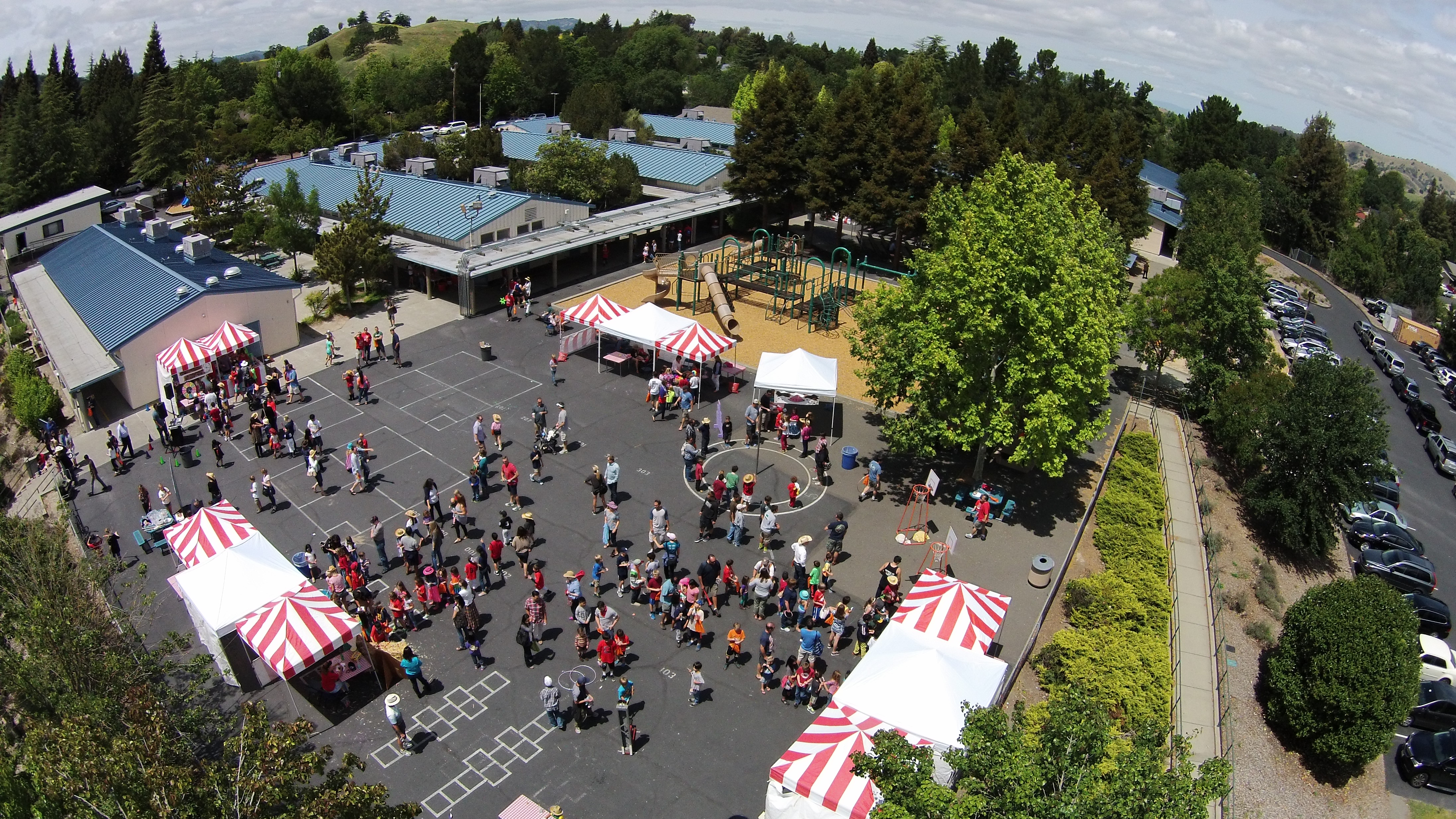
Aerial view of Alamo school during the annual hoedown celebration

- Alamo School: Today's Alamo Elementary School at 100 Wilson Road opened in 1965. It is the fourth Alamo school bearing the name. It has the original school bell from the 1880s in its courtyard. The dedication ceremony for the bell was March 22, 1974. The bell has a San Ramon Valley Historical Society plaque that commemorates the history of early education in Alamo. The three previous Alamo Schools were built near what is today the corner of Stone Valley Road West and Danville Boulevard. The first Alamo school was built back in 1871.

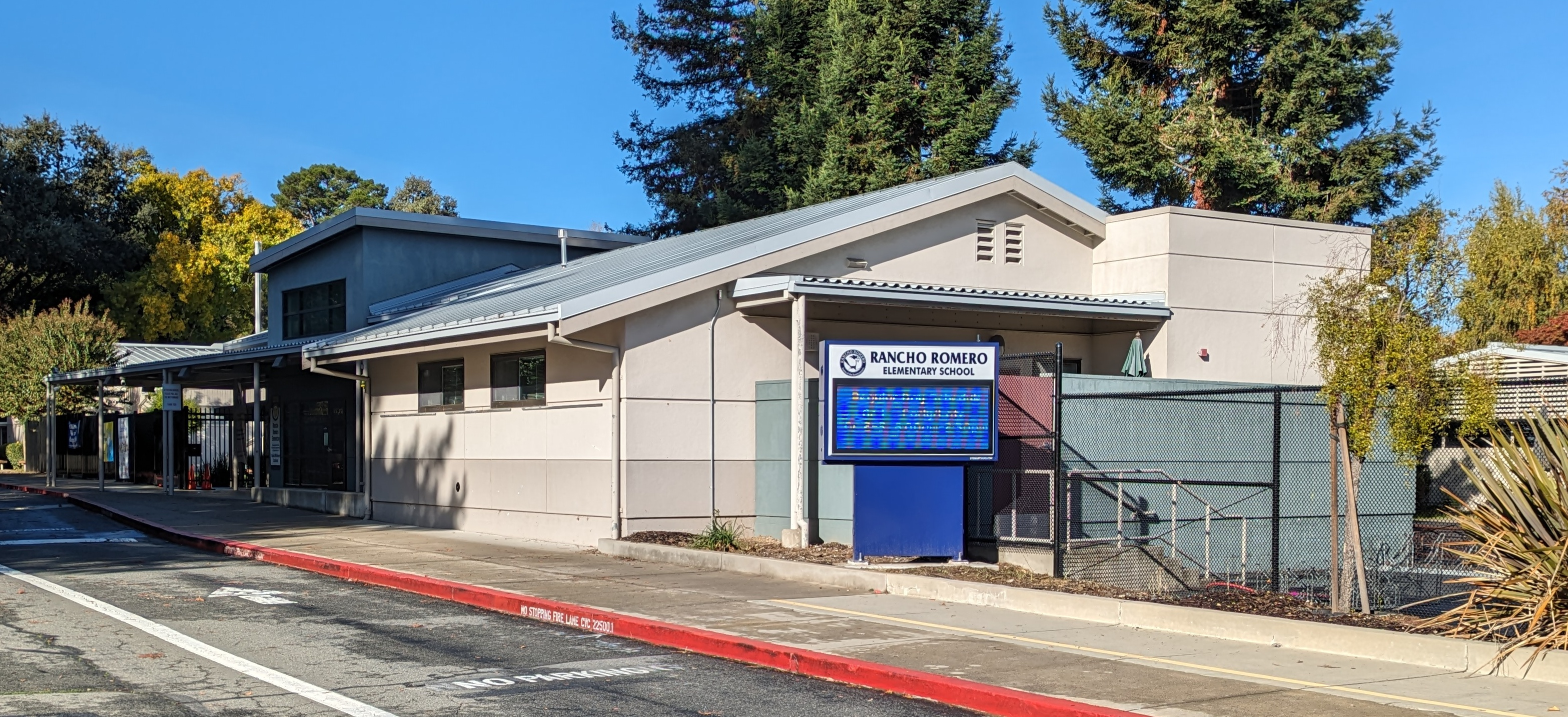
Rancho Romero Elementary School

- Rancho Romero Elementary School: The school was originally built in 1959. At that time it consisted of 12 classrooms and a small teachers' room/office combination. In 1961, a main office, kindergarten, library, multi-use room and additional classrooms were added. At present, there are 556 students and 25 self-contained classrooms. Measure A funds were used during the 1993–94 school year for a $2.5 million reconstruction of the entire school. In 1998, Rancho was designated by the Alamo Parks and Recreation Committee (R7A) to receive $350,000 for field and playground renovations and to establish park amenities for the community.
- Stone Valley Middle School is a Middle School in the suburbs of Alamo. The school has a 21-1 student to teacher ratio. Stone Valley has been newly remodeled with a budget of around US$29 million. It has an estimated 560 students (52% boys and 48% girls).

A small portion of Alamo is in the Walnut Creek Elementary School District and the Acalanes Union High School District.

== Transportation ==
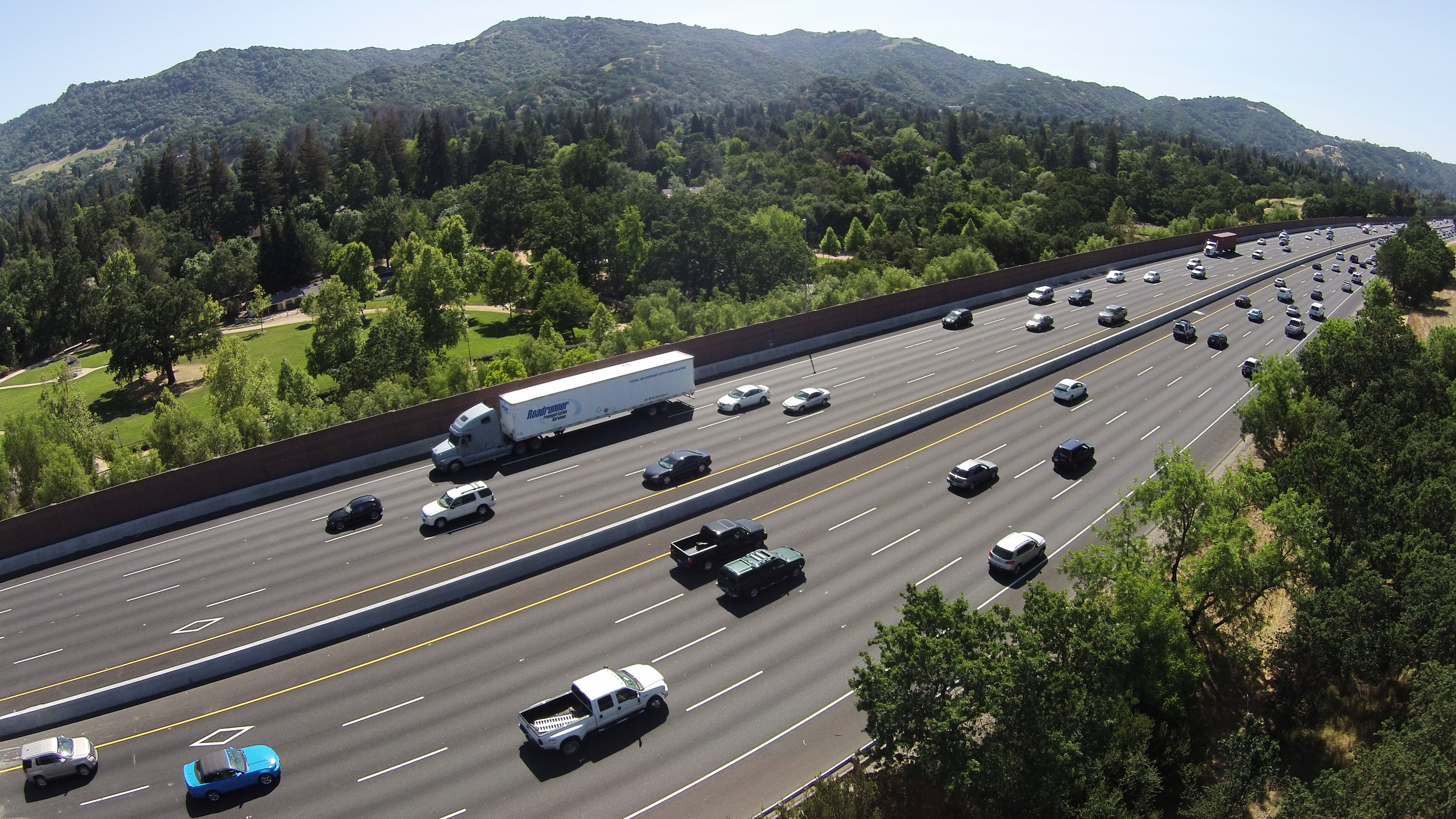
Aerial view of I-680 passing through Alamo near Hap Magee Ranch Park

Interstate 680, running north–south, is the main highway serving the San Ramon Valley. It runs north through cities such as Walnut Creek and Concord, providing access to Wine Country, Sacramento and Lake Tahoe (accessible via Interstate 80). Going south, I-680 passes through cities including Pleasanton and Fremont, ultimately reaching San Jose.

State Highway 24, which intersects I-680 in adjacent Walnut Creek, provides access to San Francisco, Oakland and Berkeley via the Caldecott Tunnel running under the Berkeley Hills.

The closest Bay Area Rapid Transit (BART) station is Walnut Creek on the Yellow Line. County Connection routes 21 and 321, running on weekdays and weekends respectively, provide local bus service along Danville Boulevard in Alamo, south to Danville and San Ramon and north to Walnut Creek, terminating at the BART station.

== Notable people ==
- Brandon Belt - San Francisco Giants MLB player
- Joan Buchanan - former member of the California State Assembly
- Steven Burd - Safeway Inc. Supermarket president and CEO
- Stephen Curry - NBA player for the Golden State Warriors
- Mark Davis - Oakland Raiders Owner
- David Duffield - billionaire co-founder of Workday, Inc and PeopleSoft
- Tony Eldridge - film producer, The Equalizer 2, raised in Alamo.
- Mason Filippi - auto racing driver
- Bret Hedican - former Anaheim Ducks NHL player
- Vili Helu - rugby union player
- Greg Kent - ex AFL/NFL player for the Detroit Lions and Oakland Raiders
- Greg Kragen - ex NFL player for the Denver Broncos, Kansas City Chiefs, and Carolina Panthers
- Tony La Russa - MLB manager of the Chicago White Sox
- Katherine Langford - actress
- JT Marcinkowski - soccer player
- Mark McGwire - former MLB player
- Mike Moore - former Oakland Athletics pitcher
- Jason Newsted - former Metallica bassist
- Greg Sestero - actor, star of cult classic The Room, author of The Disaster Artist, raised in Alamo
- Alan Silvestri - composer and conductor known for his film and television scores.
- Ellen Tauscher - former Congresswoman for California's 10th congressional district
- Bree Turner - actress, starred on NBC's Grimm, raised in Alamo
- Kristi Yamaguchi - Olympic gold medalist
