= Rancho San Ramon (Pacheco-Castro) =

Mexican land grant in California

Coordinates: 37.870°N 122.000°W

Rancho San Ramon (St. Raymond Ranch in Spanish) was a 8,917-acre (36.09 km^{2}) Mexican land grant in the northern San Ramon Valley of present-day Contra Costa County, California. Rancho San Ramon (Amador) was adjacent in the southern San Ramon Valley.

It was given in 1833 by Governor Jose Figueroa to Mariano Castro and Bartolome Pacheco. Governor Figueroa granted Castro and Pacheco two square leagues of San Ramon Valley from the crest of the western ridge to the crest of the east. Castro had the northern square league, and Pacheco the southern.

The grant included present-day Alamo, Danville and northern San Ramon.

== History ==
Bartolome Pacheco (1766–1839), the son of Juan Salvio Pacheco (1729–1777) and Maria Carmen del Valle, came to San Francisco with his family in 1776 with the Anza Expedition. He was the cousin of Salvio Pacheco, a noted Californio ranchero. Bartolome Pacheco joined the military company of the Presidio of San Francisco. He was present at the dedication of Mission San José in 1797, and retired after 20 years as a soldier. Mariano Castro was his nephew (Bartolome Pacheco's sister, Barbara Pacheco de Castro, was Mariano Castro’s mother).

In the 1830s, the San Ramon Valley was still wild country, and Pacheco and Castro received permission to live out of the valley. Mariano Castro and his family lived in the Pueblo of San José. Bartolome Pacheco lived in the San Mateo area and, when he died in 1839, his son Lorenzo Pacheco became the owner. Lorenzo Pacheco and Rafaela Soto were married in 1837 and lived in Pueblo of San Jose. When Lorenzo died in 1846, Rafaela Soto de Pacheco and her four small children inherited the Pacheco square league of the Rancho San Ramon.

With the cession of California to the United States following the Mexican-American War, the 1848 Treaty of Guadalupe Hidalgo provided that the land grants would be honored. As required by the Land Act of 1851, a claim for Rancho San Ramon was filed with the Public Land Commission in 1852. The notorious American land attorney Horace Carpentier "helped" Rafaela Soto de Pacheco with her title challenges, and ended up owning the entire Pacheco-Castro rancho land. The grant was patented to Horace W. Carpentier in 1866.

== See also ==
- Ranchos of Contra Costa County, California
- List of ranchos of California
