= San Ramon Valley =

Valley in California, United States of America

Coordinates: 37.75°N 121.95°W

The San Ramon Valley is a valley and region in Contra Costa County and Alameda County, in the East Bay region of the San Francisco Bay Area in northern California.

== Geography ==
The valley is between the Oakland Hills on the west, and the Diablo Range on the east. The western side of the valley is formed by Las Trampas Ridge.

The valley's population is around 150,000 people.

The city of San Ramon, town of Danville, as well as the southern edge of Walnut Creek and the northern end of Dublin are located in the valley, as are the census-designated places (CDPs) of Alamo, Blackhawk, Camino Tassajara and Diablo.

Interstate 680 serves as the primary transportation route for the area. The Iron Horse Regional Trail also runs the length of the valley.

== See also ==
- Rancho San Ramon (Pacheco-Castro) – 19th century Mexican rancho of the northern valley
- Rancho San Ramon (Amador) – 19th century Mexican rancho of the southern valley
