= Dougherty, California =

Unincorporated community in California, United States

Dougherty
- Unincorporated community
- Location in California Dougherty (the United States)
- Coordinates: 37°42′40″N 121°54′35″W
- Country: United States
- State: California
- County: Alameda County
- Elevation: 348 ft (106 m)

Dougherty (also, Amador's, Amador Valley, and Dougherty Station) was an unincorporated community in Alameda County, California. It was associated with two separate areas near Dublin, the first at an elevation of 348 feet (106 m).

James Witt Dougherty purchased the land in and around what is now Dublin, CA, in 1852. The land included a two-story adobe building that formerly belonged to Jose Maria Amador. A community grew up around the adobe and associated ranch, and was first called Amador's and Amador Valley after Jose Maria Amador the original owner of Rancho San Ramon (Amador). Dougherty built a hotel near the adobe and at the crossroads of two important local roads. One road went north–south and connected communities from Martinez south to Mission San Jose. The other road went east–west and connected the San Francisco Bay area with communities such as Livermore, Stockton and the California Central Valley. Dougherty obtained the post office contract in 1860 and used the name Dougherty Station. The post office name was shortened to Dougherty in 1896 and it closed in 1908.

The second Dougherty was a platted area about two miles east of the original location. It was established by Charles Medley Dougherty, the son of James Witt Dougherty, and named after the family. It was designed to take advantage of an extension of the Southern Pacific Railroad connecting from San Ramon to Pleasanton in the early 1900s. Besides a railroad platform, there may never have been any homes or businesses constructed in the planned community. The area, Dougherty, continued to appear on some maps throughout the Twentieth century and may still be found on some online maps.
