= Barbara Willis =

American ceramic artist (1917-2011)

- Born: Barbara Lucile Thompson; June 29, 1917; Bakersfield, California
- Died: September 3, 2011 (aged 94); San Ramon, California
- Education: UCLA
- Known for: Ceramics

Barbara Willis (née Thompson) (June 29, 1917 - September 3, 2011) was an American southern Californian ceramic artist. "She was among the first to adapt studio techniques to commercial pottery, using molds to mass produce simple geometric wares that had a hand-made look." After having a ceramic studio in North Hollywood from 1948 to 1958, Willis once again began to create her signature Terrene Pottery in her 70s and would continue hand-producing her ceramics into her early 90s.

== History ==
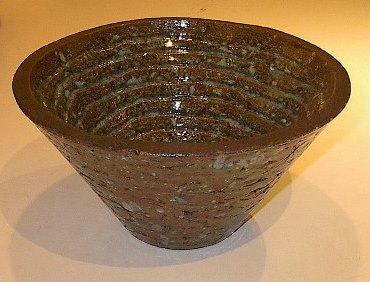
Barbara Willis pottery 2006

Barbara Willis was born Barbara Lucile Thompson June 29, 1917, in Bakersfield, California to Glenn and Lucile Thompson. Willis moved with her family to Los Angeles when she was eight years old. In 1940, Willis graduated from UCLA with a Bachelor of Arts with a major in education and a minor in art. Willis studied with studio ceramicist Laura Andreson. Willis used many of the same techniques taught by Andreson including crackle glazes and intense colors including turquoise, citron and a deep Chinese red.

In the 1940s, Willis began making ceramics after husband joined the United States Army Air Corps, signing her works "Barbara Willis." Willis was also known as Barbara Willis Abbott. In 1941, Willis partnered with Jean Rose setting up a studio in Rose's residence. The new venture was named Barbara-Jean Pottery Studio. From 1941 to 1942, ceramist Susi Singer contracted with the studio to cast and fire Singer figurines. Willis and Rose separated their partnership in 1942 with Willis opening up her own ceramic studio Barbara Willis Pottery. Dick Knox agreed to represent her lines to the trade, choosing the trade name Terrene ("of the earth") Pottery. By 1948, Willis had twelve employees working out of a studio in North Hollywood. Willis produced streamlined art ware which included vases, platter, bowls, figurines, ashtrays, and kitchen ware. Some of her work was decorated with decals. In 1958, her ceramics studio closed. Willis estimated she produced more than 250,000 pieces prior to closing her studio.

In 1996, Willis discovered her ceramic wares were collectible and she was considered to be modernist ceramic artist by collectors. Willis, in her late 70s, decided to produce her signature Terrene Pottery in her kitchen in Malibu, California, signing the pottery "Barbara Willis" In 2009, Willis moved to live with her daughter in San Ramon, California, and retired from making her signature Terrene Pottery at the age of 92. Barbara Willis died September 3, 2011, of natural causes at her home in San Ramon, California.

== Exhibitions ==
- 2001 San Francisco Museum of Modern Art California Pottery, From Missions to Modernism
- 2003 Autry Museum of the American West, California Pottery, From Missions to Modernism
- 2011 Los Angeles County Museum of Art, California Design, 1930-1965 "Living in a Modern Way"
- 2012 Autry National Center, California's Designing Women 1896-1986
