= Steven Burd =

American businessman

Steve Burd
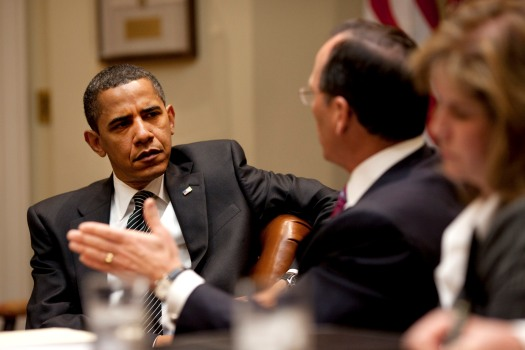
- Burd (middle) and other business leaders meet with President Barack Obama, 2009.
- Born: 1949 (age 76–77); Valley City, North Dakota, U.S.
- Education: Carroll University (BS); University of Wisconsin, Milwaukee (MA)
- Occupations: President, Chairman and CEO of Safeway Inc (1992–2013); President and CEO of Burd Health LLC (2013–present)
- Political party: Republican

Steven A. Burd (born 1949) is an American businessman. He served as chairman, president and CEO of Safeway Inc. from October 26, 1992, to May 14, 2013. He is a member of the Republican Party.

== Early life ==
Burd received a Bachelor of Science degree in Economics from Carroll University in 1971 and a master's degree in economics from the University of Wisconsin–Milwaukee in 1973.

== Career ==
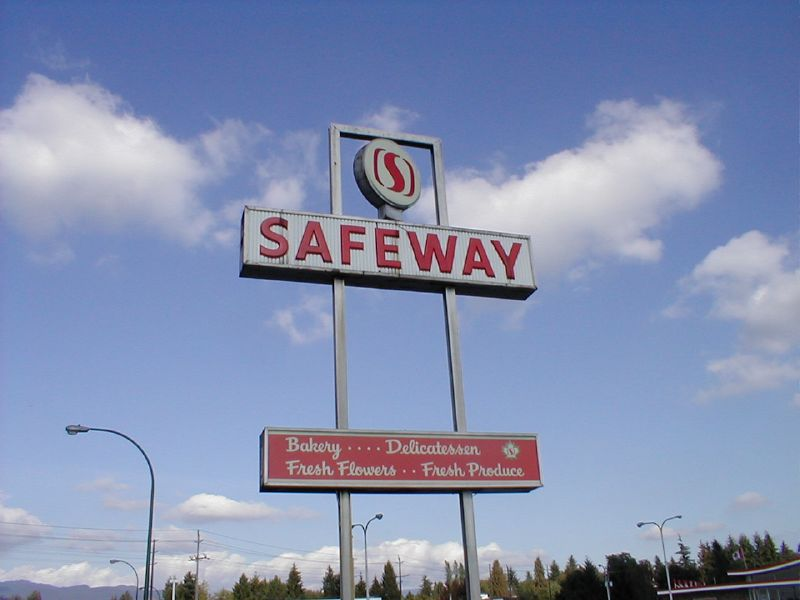
Safeway Inc. sign

Burd was President of Safeway from October 26, 1992, until May 14, 2013, and CEO from April 30, 1993, until May 14, 2013. He joined the Board of Directors on September 7, 1993, and served as chairman of the board between May 12, 1998, and May 14, 2013. While CEO of Safeway in 2009, he earned a total compensation of $10,901,892, which included a base salary of $1,449,000, a cash bonus of $358,627, stock awards of $491,611 and options granted of $6,922,200.

Burd spearheaded the innovative "Healthy Measures" insurance plan offered to Safeway employees. In this plan, employees get discounts on their health insurance if they show qualified performance in four "tests": tobacco usage, healthy weight, blood pressure and cholesterol levels. Employees can get as much as an $800 annual premium reduction. He founded the Coalition to Advance Healthcare Reform in order to promote similar health policies nationally.

In January 2010, the Washington Post reported that Burd's assertion in June 2009 that Safeway's per capita health-care costs between 2005 and 2009 were flat was in fact true, but had nothing to do with incentives for employees. Those incentives weren't implemented until 2009, and the company forecast that per capita expenses for its employees would rise by 8.5 percent for the 2009 year.

As of 2013, Burd sits on the Board of Directors of Kohl's. In September 2013, Burd also founded Burd Health LLC with the intent to help companies lower the costs of their own healthcare plans.

== Theranos Scandal ==
Burd led the initiative to partner with Theranos and build wellness centers in Safeway stores. The deal made Safeway the exclusive grocery store provider of Theranos technology and spawned a secret, internal project called “T-Rex” to create wellness centers in their stores. Safeway spent $350 million renovating over 800 stores to support these centers. According to former employees, he managed the partnership directly with Theranos CEO Elizabeth Holmes.

In 2012, Burd told investors and that the grocery chain was “contemplating a significant…wellness play.” During the implementation of the project, Safeway had Theranos conduct blood testing at their headquarters clinic that compared Theranos test results with those of traditional blood testing methods. However, these results showed inconsistencies between the two methods. According to two former executives, Burd was told about the inconsistent results. Burd told them that he had been reassured by Elizabeth Holmes and continued to support the project.

In April 2013, when asked by analysts about the wellness play he had alluded to in earlier calls, he said “It hasn’t happened yet.” Burd retired from Safeway the next month. No Theranos devices were ever successfully deployed in Safeway stores and in November 2015, Safeway and Theranos formally ended their relationship.

On October 6, 2021, Burd testified in the Theranos trial and gave details about the failed multimillion-dollar remodel of the Safeway stores. He gave evidence that Safeway spent $300 million to build out clinics in hundreds of Safeway stores and the strategy of the partnership was, "while you’re shopping and before you leave you’re going to get the results of that blood test." Burd also testified that Holmes told them the Theranos blood testing technology was deployed by the U.S. military in the Middle East.

== Personal life ==
Burd is married to Chris and has two children. He is a born-again Christian and lives in Alamo, California.
