= San Ramon, California =

City in California, United States

- City
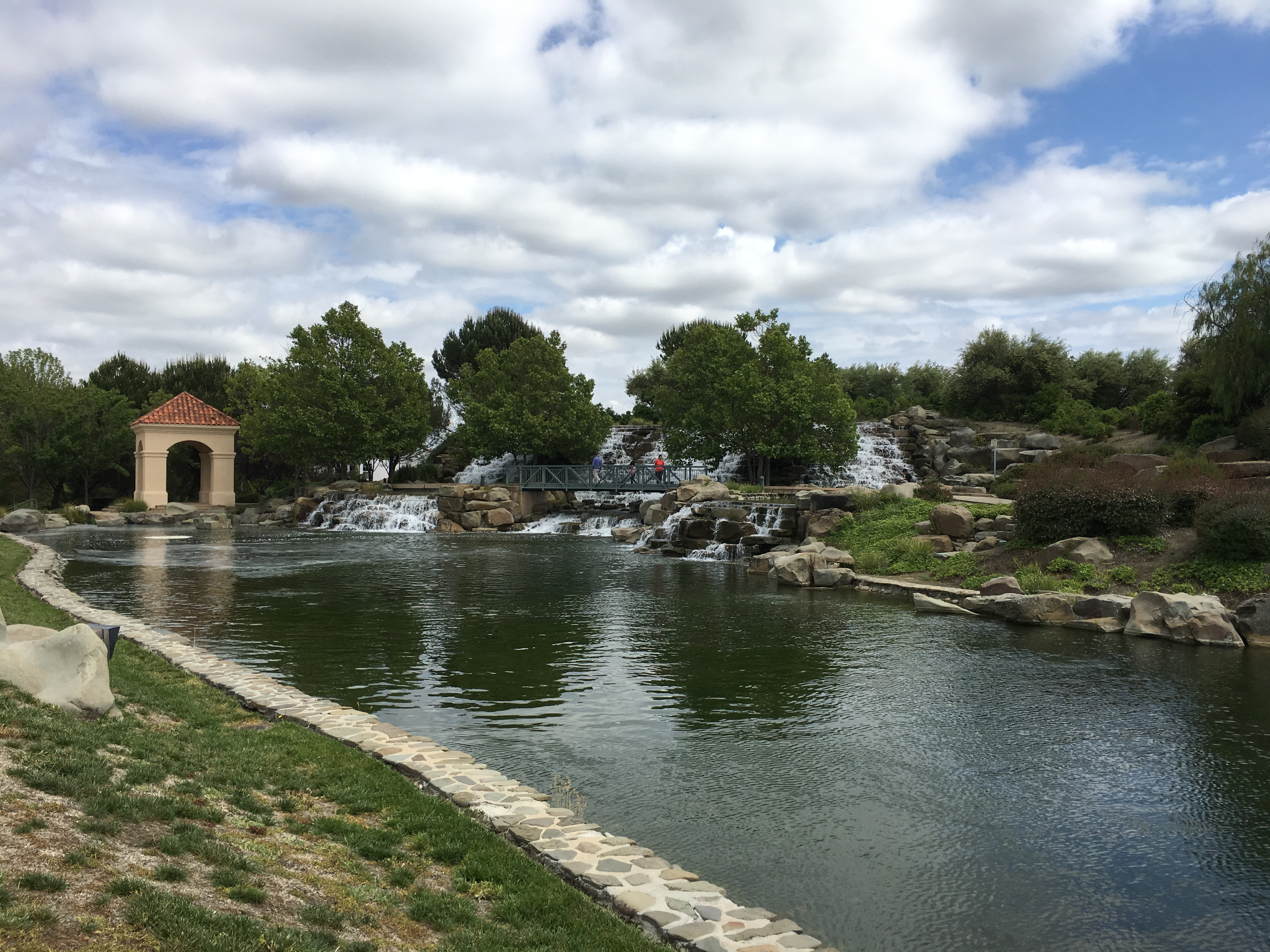
- San Ramon Waterfall Park

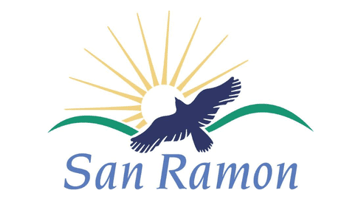
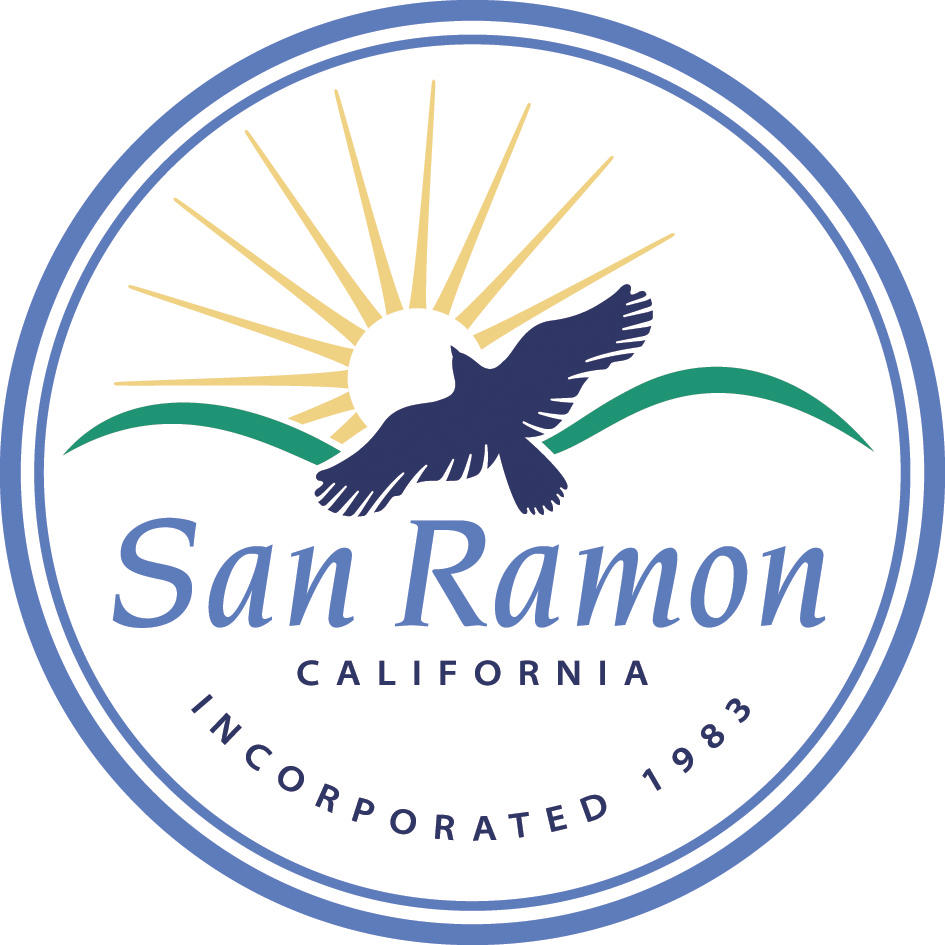
- Flag Seal
- Interactive map of San Ramon, California
- Location in the United States
- Coordinates: 37°46′48″N 121°58′41″W
- Country: United States
- State: California
- County: Contra Costa
- Incorporated: July 1, 1983

Government
  - Mayor: Mark Armstrong
  - State senator: Tim Grayson (D)
  - Assemblymember: Rebecca Bauer-Kahan (D)
  - United States representatives: Mark DeSaulnier (D)

Area
  - Total: 18.72 sq mi (48.48 km^{2})
  - Land: 18.68 sq mi (48.39 km^{2})
  - Water: 0.035 sq mi (0.09 km^{2}) 0.18%
- Elevation: 486 ft (148 m)

Population (2020)
  - Total: 84,605
  - Rank: 98th in California
  - Density: 4,528/sq mi (1,748/km^{2})
- Time zone: UTC−8 (Pacific)
  - Summer (DST): UTC−7 (PDT)
- ZIP Codes: 94582–94583
- Area code: 925
- FIPS code: 06-68378
- GNIS feature IDs: 1656275, 2411805
- Website: www.sanramon.ca.gov

San Ramon (Spanish: San Ramón, meaning "Saint Raymond") is a city in Contra Costa County, California, United States, located within the San Ramon Valley, and 34 miles (55 km) east of San Francisco. San Ramon's population was 84,605 per the 2020 census, making it the fourth-largest city in Contra Costa County, behind Concord, Richmond, and Antioch.

San Ramon is home to the Cooper Companies, the West Coast headquarters of AT&T, GE Digital, and the San Ramon Medical Center. Major annual events include the Art and Wind Festival on Memorial Day weekend and the Run for Education in October.

== History ==
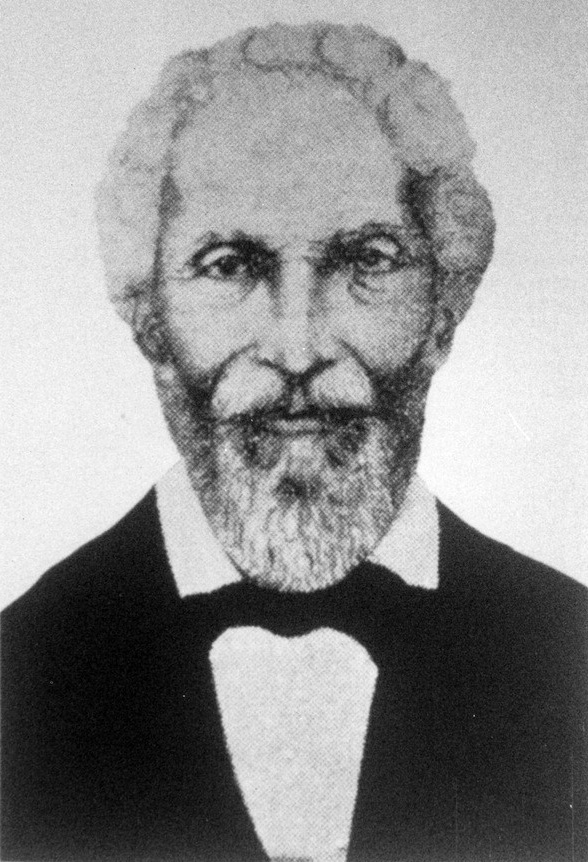
The city of San Ramon grew out of Rancho San Ramón, granted in 1834 to José María Amador (shown), a prominent Californio miner and ranchero.

The land occupied by the City of San Ramon was once inhabited by Seunen people, an Ohlone/Costanoan group who built their homes near creeks. Sometime around 1797, they were taken by Mission San José for use as grazing land. In 1834, they were part of the Rancho San Ramon land grant to José María Amador.

The area went through several informal names in the 1800s, including Brevensville, Lynchville, and Limerick. Amador named San Ramón (Spanish for 'Saint Raymond') after a Native American vaquero, who tended mission sheep on the land. Amador added the "San" per Spanish custom. In 1850, the first permanent American settlers, Leo and Mary Jane Norris, purchased the northwest corner of Amador's Rancho San Ramon, near the intersection of present-day Bollinger Canyon Road and Crow Canyon Road. In 1873, San Ramon became the official place name when a permanent post office was opened, further established when a railroad arrived.

The tracks for the San Ramon Branch Line of the Southern Pacific Railroad were laid down and completed in 1891. The line extended from San Ramon to an unincorporated area known as Avon, east of Martinez, where it connected to the Oakland/Stockton Line. On February 7, 1909, Southern Pacific extended the line south to Radum (near Pleasanton). In 1934, passenger service ended. By 1986, Contra Costa County had obtained the railroad right-of-way and the Iron Horse Regional Trail was established along its path.

On April 24, 2001, San Ramon was designated a Tree City USA.

== Geography ==
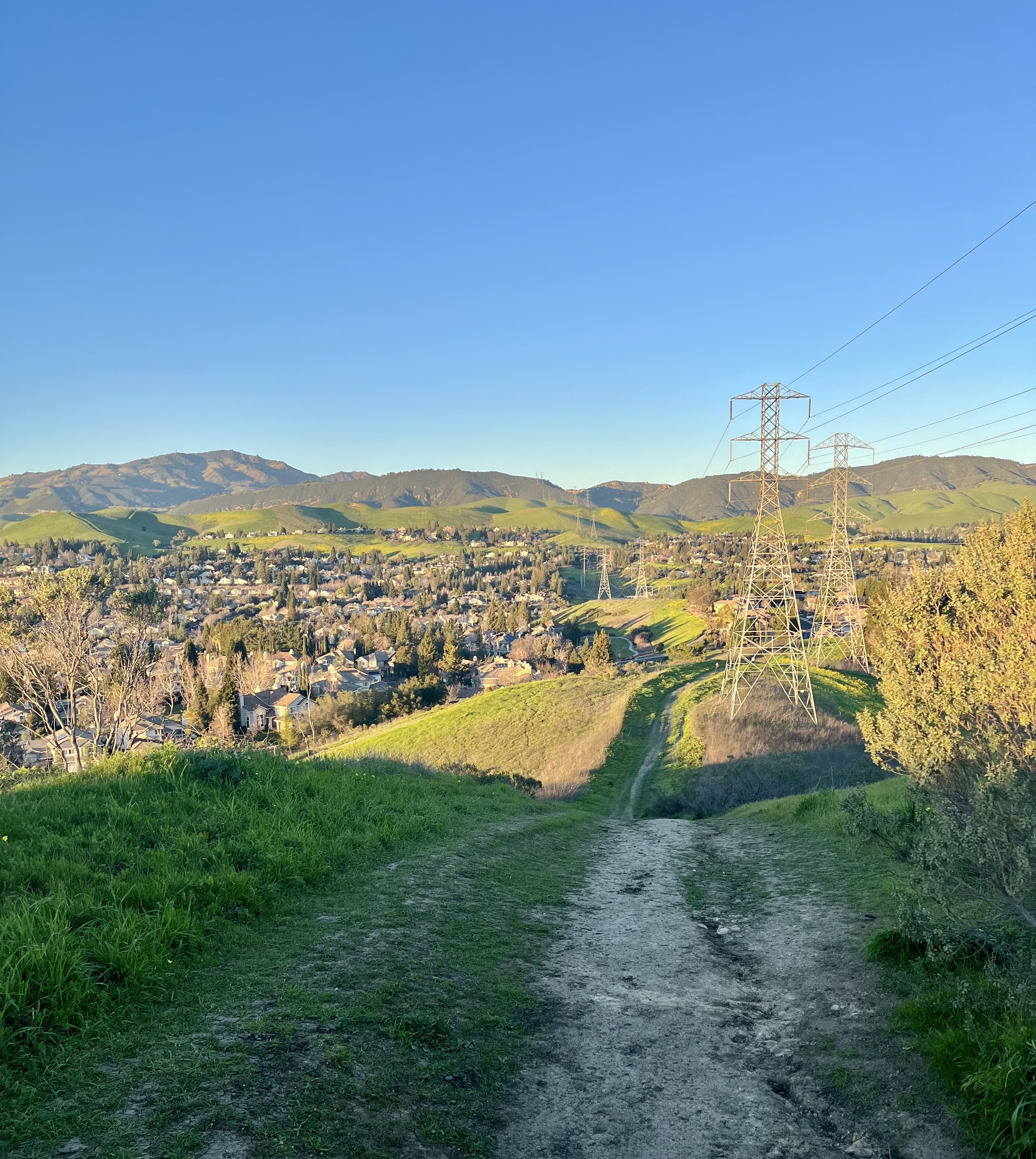
Mount Diablo and neighborhoods of northern San Ramon as viewed from one of the many trails in the city

Mount Diablo flanks the city to the northeast and is prominently visible from almost all parts of the city. The Las Trampas Regional Wilderness borders San Ramon's extreme northwest, at the northern end of Bollinger Canyon. The smaller Bishop Ranch Regional Preserve straddles San Ramon's western border, located roughly between Interstate 680 and the Alameda County line.

The topography of San Ramon is varied, featuring a mix of the rolling hills of the Diablo Range and the flatter basin of the San Ramon Valley. The city is predominantly urban and residential with many new housing developments; however, much of the land around the city's perimeter regions remains undeveloped, and is covered by grasslands and oak forests. During the drier months, the grass is golden, but with the precipitation of winter and spring, the grass turns green.

=== Climate ===
San Ramon's weather typifies a Mediterranean climate, seasonal, and moderate. Summers can range from warm to hot and dry, while winters are cool, wet, and rather short. Its weather is similar to the adjacent cities of Danville, Dublin and Pleasanton. Fog can be infrequent, but occurs normally in the western reaches of the city, at the eastern mouth of Crow Canyon, through which marine weather patterns funnel in from the San Francisco Bay via Castro Valley. It usually burns off by mid- to late morning. Snow in the lower elevations of the San Francisco Bay Area (including East Bay) is generally considered extremely rare, but the East Bay lower-elevation cities are affected by chance of light snowfall or dusting twice in 5 years.

Climate data for San Ramon, California
Month	Jan	Feb	Mar	Apr	May	Jun	Jul	Aug	Sep	Oct	Nov	Dec	Year
Record high °F (°C)	73 (23)	80 (27)	83 (28)	97 (36)	99 (37)	105 (41)	102 (39)	107 (42)	111 (44)	98 (37)	87 (31)	76 (24)	111 (44)
Mean daily maximum °F (°C)	58 (14)	61 (16)	63 (17)	67 (19)	70 (21)	75 (24)	80 (27)	82 (28)	77 (25)	73 (23)	65 (18)	59 (15)	68 (20)
Mean daily minimum °F (°C)	37 (3)	43 (6)	44 (7)	46 (8)	49 (9)	52 (11)	54 (12)	55 (13)	55 (13)	52 (11)	45 (7)	39 (4)	48 (9)
Record low °F (°C)	26 (−3)	26 (−3)	29 (−2)	30 (−1)	35 (2)	41 (5)	44 (7)	43 (6)	41 (5)	32 (0)	30 (−1)	18 (−8)	18 (−8)
Average precipitation inches (mm)	5.20 (132)	4.80 (122)	4.27 (108)	1.72 (44)	0.71 (18)	0.15 (3.8)	0.06 (1.5)	0.11 (2.8)	0.36 (9.1)	1.55 (39)	3.69 (94)	3.84 (98)	26.46 (672)
Source 1: The Weather Channel
Source 2: MSN Weather

== Demographics ==
Historical population
Census	Pop.	Note	%±
1880	75		—
1970	4,084		—
1980	22,356		447.4%
1990	35,303		57.9%
2000	44,722		26.7%
2010	72,148		61.3%
2020	84,605		17.3%
U.S. Decennial Census

=== Racial and ethnic composition ===
San Ramon, California – Racial and ethnic composition Note: the US Census treats Hispanic/Latino as an ethnic category. This table excludes Latinos from the racial categories and assigns them to a separate category. Hispanics/Latinos may be of any race.
Race / Ethnicity (NH = Non-Hispanic)	Pop 2000	Pop 2010	Pop 2020	% 2000	% 2010	% 2020
White alone (NH)	32,356	34,956	27,140	72.35%	48.45%	32.08%
Black or African American alone (NH)	842	1,946	2,113	1.88%	2.70%	2.50%
Native American or Alaska Native alone (NH)	142	128	100	0.32%	0.18%	0.12%
Asian alone (NH)	6,629	25,531	43,052	14.82%	35.39%	50.89%
Native Hawaiian or Pacific Islander alone (NH)	89	141	174	0.20%	0.20%	0.21%
Other race alone (NH)	131	146	427	0.29%	0.20%	0.50%
Multiracial (NH)	1,295	3,050	4,497	2.90%	4.23%	5.32%
Hispanic or Latino (any race)	3,238	6,250	7,102	7.24%	8.66%	8.39%
Total	44,722	72,148	84,605	100.00%	100.00%	100.00%

=== 2020 census ===
As of the 2020 census, San Ramon had a population of 84,605. The population density was 4,528.0 inhabitants per square mile (1,748.3/km^{2}). The median age was 39.9 years. The age distribution was 27.3% under 18, 7.6% from 18 to 24, 24.1% from 25 to 44, 29.7% from 45 to 64, and 11.2% who were 65 or older. For every 100 females, there were 96.7 males, and for every 100 females 18 and over, there were 93.4 males.

The census reported that 99.90% of the population lived in households, 0.06% lived in noninstitutionalized group quarters, and 0.03% were institutionalized. 99.1% of residents lived in urban areas, while 0.9% lived in rural areas.

Of the 28,447 households in San Ramon, 47.7% had children under 18 living in them, 67.7% were married-couple households, 3.7% were cohabiting couple households, 10.6% were households with a male householder and no spouse or partner present, and 17.9% were households with a female householder and no spouse or partner present. About 16.1% of all households were made up of individuals, and 5.9% had someone living alone who was 65 or older. The average household size was 2.97, with 22,690 families (79.8% of all households).

The 29,146 housing units had an average density of 1,559.9 units per square mile (602.3 units/km^{2}). Of all housing units, 2.4% were vacant, with a homeowner vacancy rate of 0.4% and a rental vacancy rate of 4.3%. Of the 28,447 occupied units (97.6%), 68.2% were owner-occupied and 31.8% were occupied by renters.

=== Income and poverty ===
In 2023, the US Census Bureau estimated that the median household income in 2023 was $197,358 and the per capita income was $82,145. About 3.1% of families and 4.1% of the population were below the poverty line.

=== 2010 census ===
The 2010 United States census reported that San Ramon had a population of 72,148. The population density was 3,991.1 inhabitants per square mile (1,541.0/km^{2}). The racial makeup of San Ramon was 53.6% White, 2.8% African American, 0.3% Native American, 35.6% Asian, 0.2% Pacific Islander, 2.1% from other races, and 3,856 (5.3%) from two or more races. Hispanics or Latinos of any race were 6,250 persons (8.7%).

The ensus reported that 99.9% of the population lived in households, 0.1% lived in noninstitutionalized group quarters, and less than 0.1 were institutionalized.

Of the 25,284 households, 47.4% had children under 18 living in them, 64.5% were opposite-sex married couples living together, 7.9% had a female householder with no husband present, and 3.4% had a male householder with no wife present. The city had 4.2% unmarried opposite-sex partnerships and 0.7% same-sex married couples or partnerships; 18.5% of the households were made up of individuals and 4.4% had someone living alone who was 65 or older. The average household size was 2.85. Families made up 75.8% of all households; the average family size was 3.30.

The age distribution was 29.6% under 18, 4.9% from 18 to 24, 31.6% from 25 to 44, 26.1% from 45 to 64, and 5,627 people (7.8%) who were 65 or older. The median age was 37.1 years. For every 100 females, there were 96.6 males. For every 100 females 18 and over, there were 92.4 males.

The 26,222 housing units had an average density of 1,450.6 units per square mile (560.1 units/km^{2}), of which 25,284 were occupied (71.4% by owners and 28.6% by renters). The homeowner vacancy rate was 1.3%; the rental vacancy rate was 4.0%. About 75.8% of the population lived in owner-occupied housing units and 24.1% lived in rental housing units.

The median income in the city for a household was $119,297 and for a family was $132,339. Males had a median income of $97,475 versus $70,083 for females. The per capita income for the city was $50,736. About 2.0% of families and 2.8% of the population were below the poverty line, including 2.9% of those under 18 and 3.5% of those 65 or over.

== Economy ==
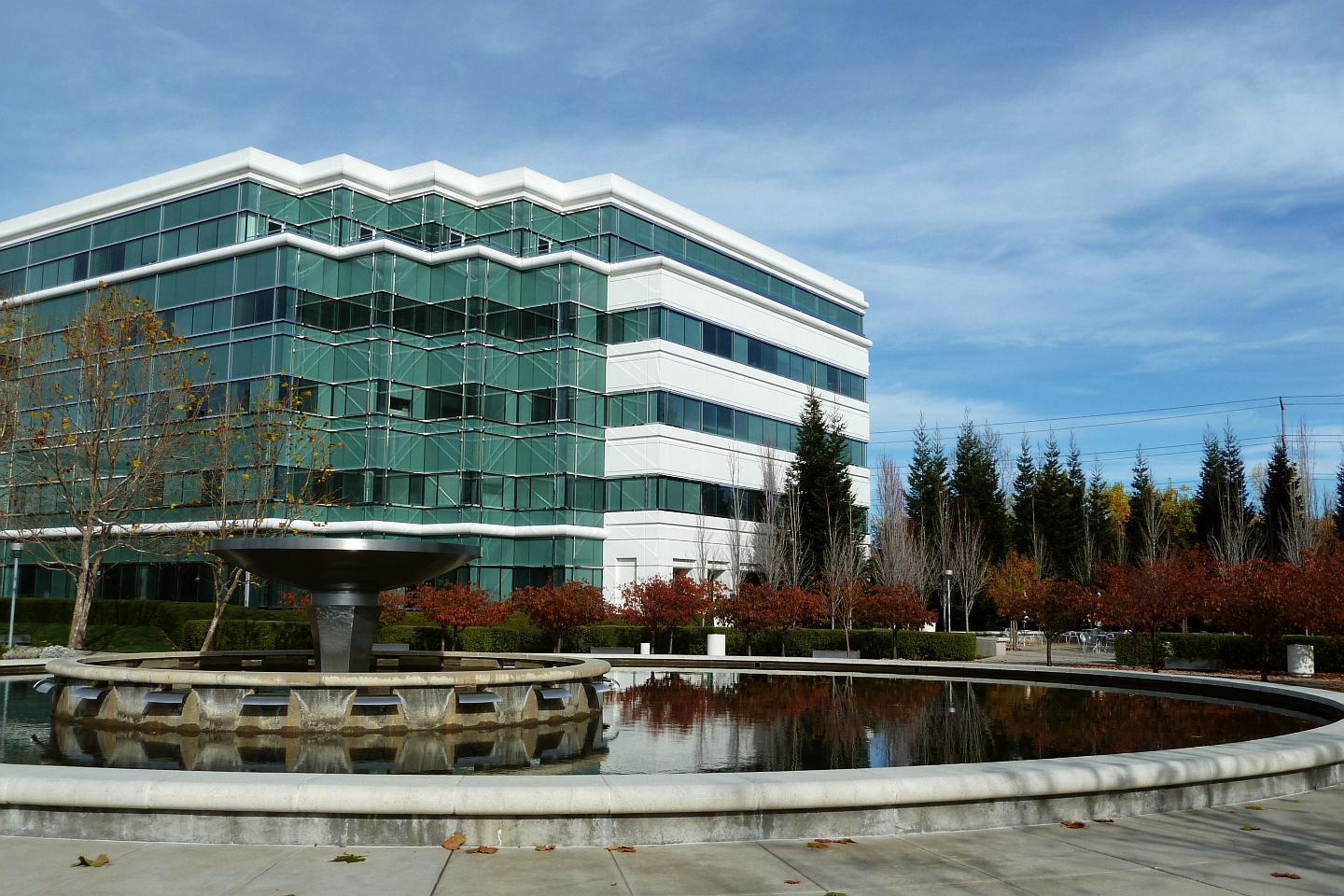
Bishop Ranch #3

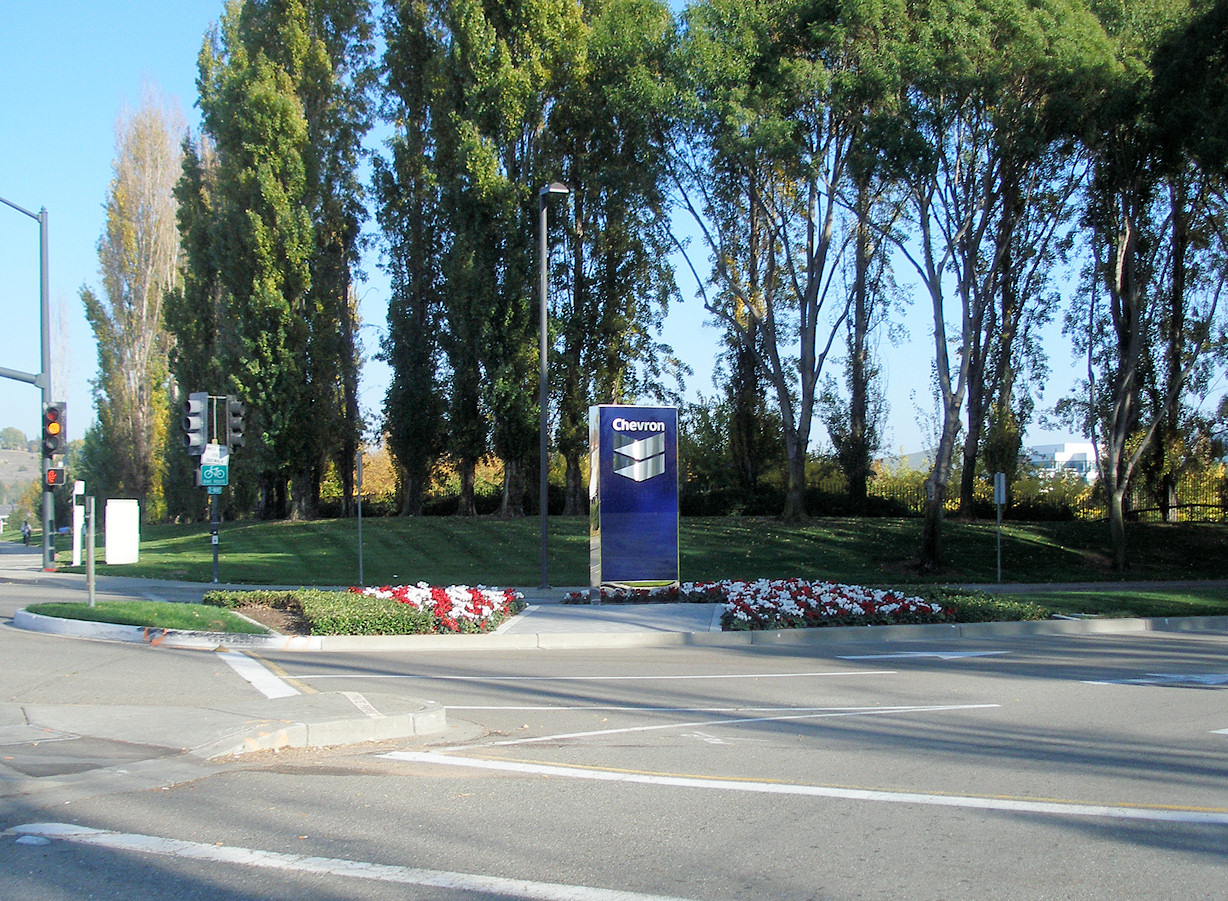
Sign marking the Chevron Corporation headquarters

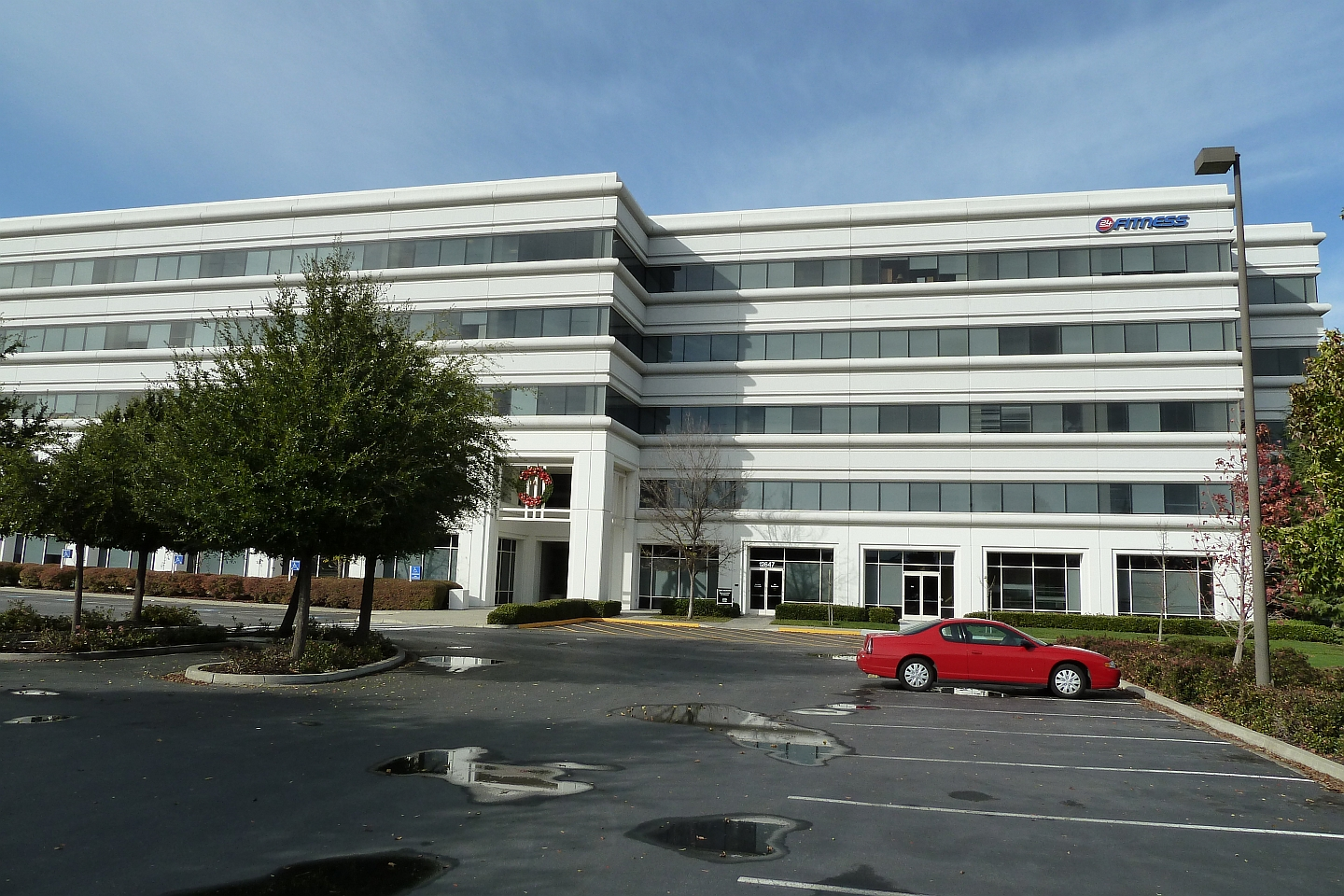
Former headquarters of 24-Hour Fitness

Bishop Ranch, a master-planned office park development, with some retail elements, began major construction in the early 1980s; it provides a healthy tax base for the city. Bishop Ranch is situated on 585 acres once owned by Western Electric and was farmland before that. Current tenants include the corporate headquarters of Chevron Corporation (formerly ChevronTexaco), as well the West Coast headquarters of AT&T Inc. (which had been the headquarters of Pacific Bell from about 1983, when it relocated from downtown San Francisco, until the merger with SBC Communications that created the current AT&T). United Parcel Service has a regional distribution center in Bishop Ranch. Toyota has a regional office and parts distribution center located there. GE Global Research started its Global Software Center in Bishop Ranch in 2011. Bishop Ranch covers the vast majority of "Central San Ramon", which is the large square formed by Freeway 680 on the west, Crow Canyon Road on the north, Iron Horse trail on the east, and Bollinger Canyon Road on the south (though several complexes are south of Bollinger). In December 2016, the Ligier EZ-10 began use in the first autonomous vehicle passenger shuttle route in North America, looping through Bishop Ranch Office Park, with on-site operation and maintenance by First Transit.

ChevronTexaco's headquarters moved from San Francisco]to San Ramon in 2001 but 12 years later, 800 jobs were moved to Houston, a quarter of the San Ramon workforce, due to high corporate costs and to consolidate existing units in Houston.

=== Largest employers ===
According to the city's 2024 Comprehensive Annual Financial Report, the top employers in the city are:

Rank	Employer	Number of Employees	Total city employment
1	Pacific Gas & Electric	2,230	5.25%
2	Chevron	1,852	2.36%
3	Robert Half International	1,364	3.21%
4	BMO Bank N.A.	658	1.55%
5	San Ramon Regional Medical Center	650	1.53%
6	Primed Management Consulting	453	1.07%
7	Five9, Inc.	448	1.05%
8	United Parcel Service	385	0.91%
9	Target	223	0.52%
10	Armanino LLP	206	0.48%

=== Downtown ===
In 2014, the city approved the design for an animated civic space featuring 350,000 square feet (33,000 m^{2}). This City Center Bishop Ranch was designed by international architectural firm Renzo Piano Building Workshop. Opened on November 8, 2018, City Center has a variety of shops, including furniture, clothing, food, and a movie theater.

== Arts and culture ==
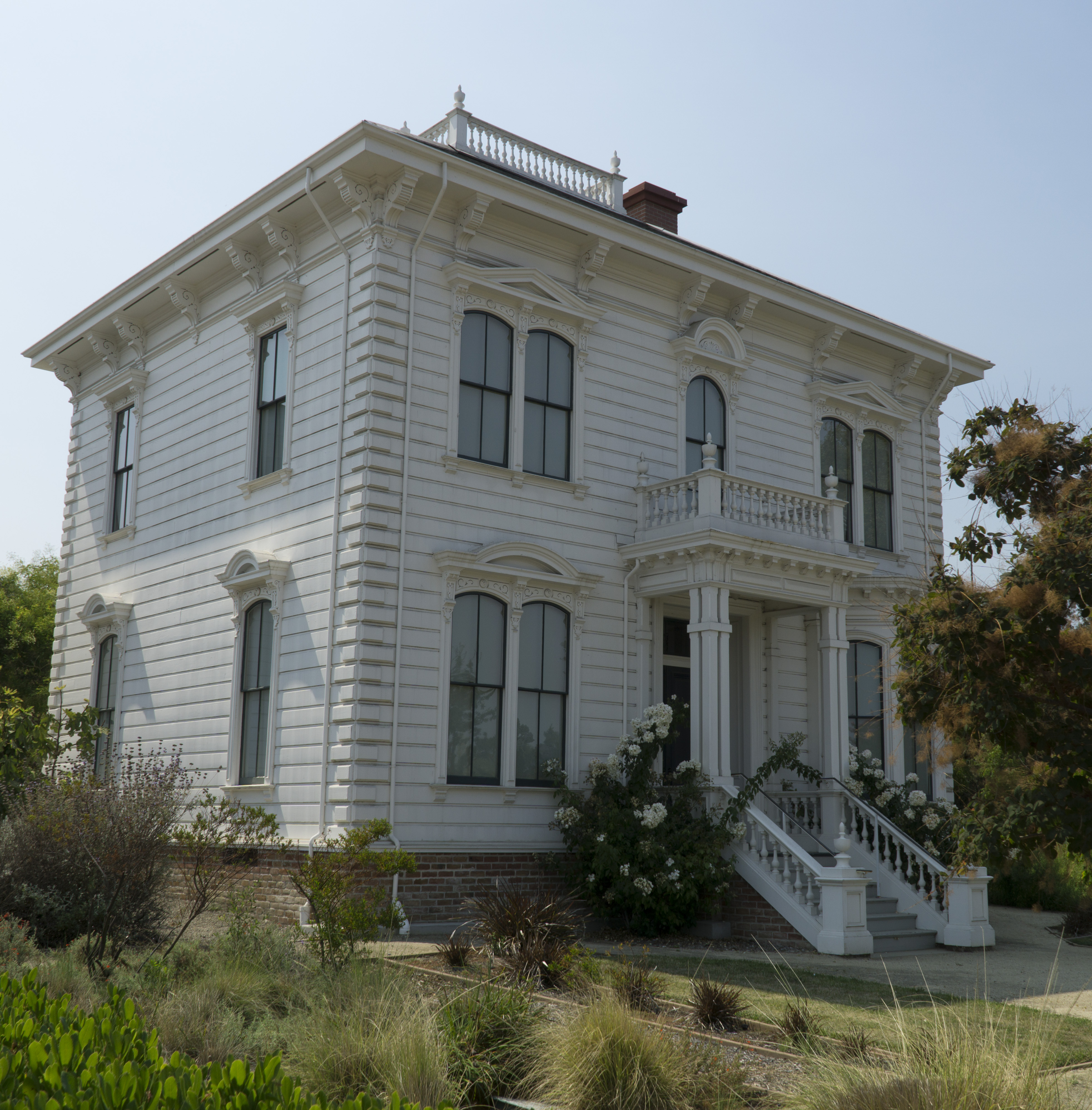
David Glass House at Forest Home Farms

The San Ramon Library and Dougherty Station Library branches of the Contra Costa County Library are in San Ramon.

Forest Home Farms in San Ramon is listed on the National Register of Historic Places.

== Parks and recreation ==
San Ramon features 58 separate parks and multiple 18-hole golf courses.

=== Memorial Park ===
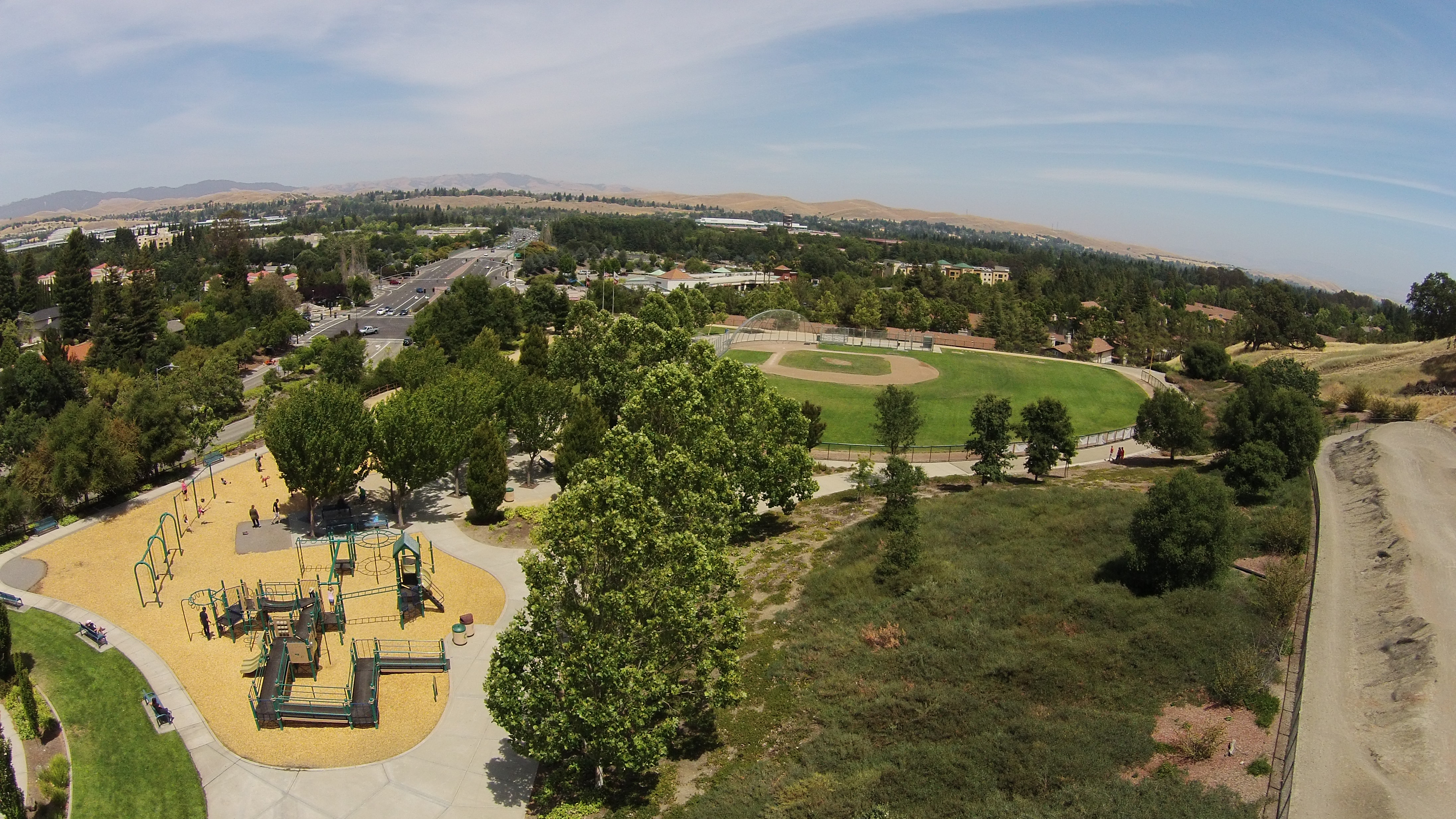
Aerial view of Memorial Park, including play area, ball field, and BMX track

Originally, this city park, located on a hill overlooking Bollinger Canyon Road and San Ramon Valley Blvd., was to be named Alta Mesa Park. During the construction of the park, the City Council voted to change the name to Memorial Park to honor Tom Burnett, a San Ramon resident, and other victims from Flight 93 killed in the September 11 attacks of 2001. A plaque was installed at the base of a lighted flagpole dedicated to those victims and the surrounding meadow is part of the city's memorial tree program dedicated to local residents who have perished. The park was dedicated on September 11, 2002.

This 16-acre park includes a play area, a BMX course, a picnic area, a bocce ball court, horseshoe courts, a ball field, a dog park, restrooms, and water fountains (including a canine water fountain). The play area has two big play structures, one for ages 2–5 and another for ages 5–12.

== Government ==
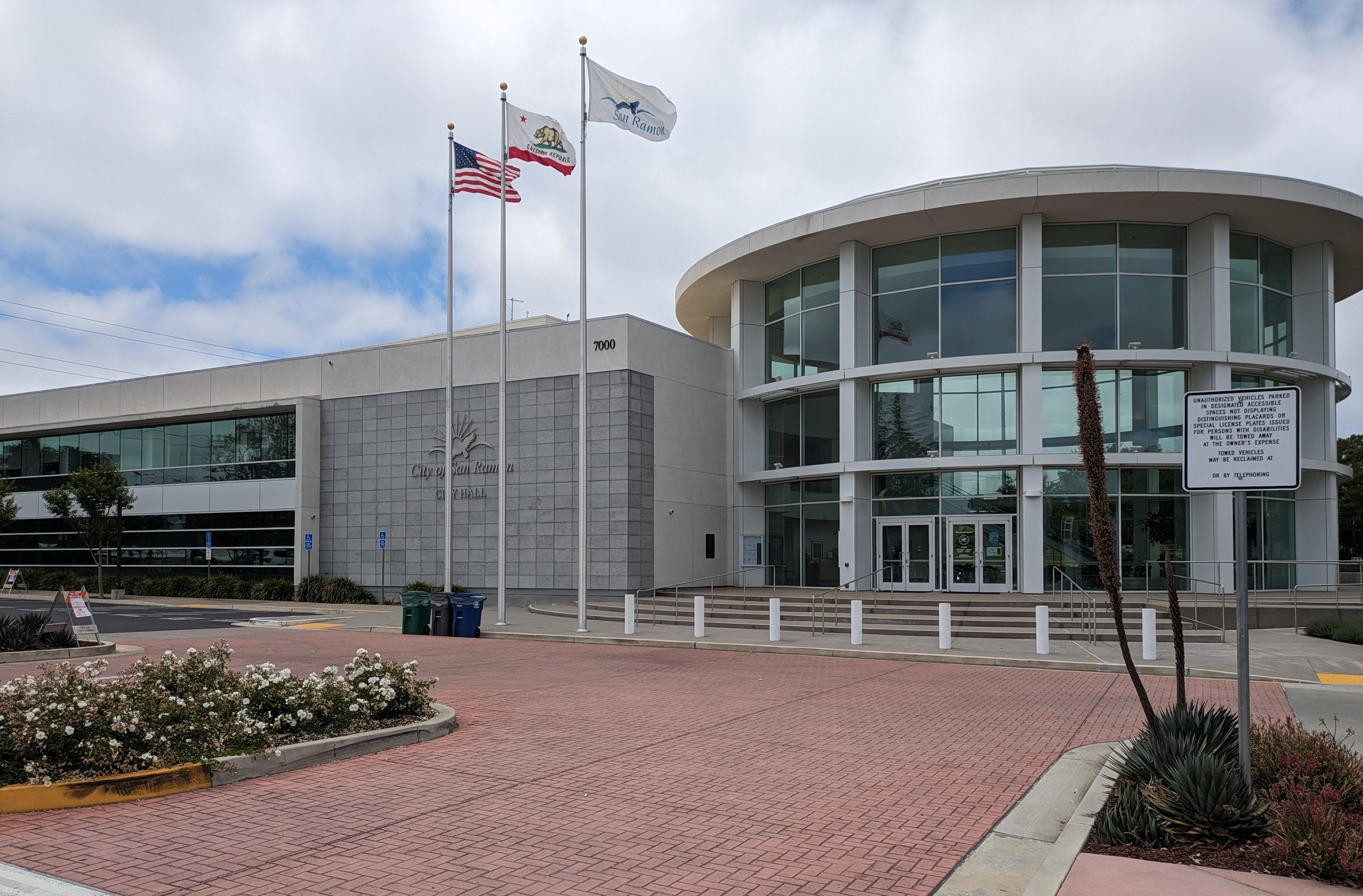
City Hall

San Ramon is governed by a five-member city council elected to four-year, overlapping terms in coordination with a two-year elected mayor. Police services were provided under contract by the Contra Costa County Sheriff until July 1, 2007, when the city officially took over providing police services.

As of 2025, the mayor is Mark Armstrong, and the other city council members are Richard Adler, Robert Jweinat, Marisol Rubio, and Sridhar Verose.

In the United States House of Representatives, the city is fully within the Contra Costa-based 10th Congressional District, represented by Democrat Mark DeSaulnier.

According to the California Secretary of State, as of February 10, 2019, San Ramon has 41,872 registered voters. Of those, 39.4% are registered Democrats, 21.3% are registered Republicans, and 29.0% have declined to state a political party.

San Ramon vote by party in presidential elections
Year	Democratic	Republican
2024	64.6% 24,985	30.9% 11,950
2020	70.4% 29,397	27.7% 11,553
2016	66.9% 21,134	27.7% 8,741
2012	60.1% 17,410	38.1% 11,028
2008	62.3% 18,517	36.2% 10,768
2004	53.0% 12,872	46.0% 11,172
2000	48.2% 9,384	48.9% 9,525
1996	45.3% 8,141	46.4% 8,349
1992	36.1% 6,569	39.9% 7,256
1988	34.5% 4,957	64.6% 9,288
1984	26.6% 2,816	72.7% 7,709

== Education ==
San Ramon's public schools are part of the San Ramon Valley Unified School District (SRVUSD), serving approximately 31,000 students. The city has 12 elementary schools and four middle schools. The high schools are California High School and Dougherty Valley High School. Some of the middle schools are Pine Valley Middle School, Gale Ranch, Windemere Ranch, and Iron Horse Middle School. The elementary schools are Walt Disney Elementary, Country Club, Montevideo, Neil Armstrong, Twin Creeks, Bollinger Canyon, Quail Run, Live Oak, Golden View, and Coyote Creek Elementary. An alternative K–12 school is operated by the SRVUSD to support home-schooled students: Venture Independent Study School, along with Del Amigo High School which offers credit recovery courses on a flexible schedule. The district has two additional high schools in Danville, including Monte Vista High School, and San Ramon Valley High School.

California High School was founded in 1973 and ranked 1049th-best high school in the United States by Newsweek. Dougherty Valley High School was founded in 2007 and is ranked 42nd within California; it is ranked 158th in the national rankings and earned a gold medal.

=== Higher education ===
- Diablo Valley College – San Ramon branch campus
- University of San Francisco – San Ramon regional campus
- UC Davis Graduate School of Management – the Bay Area working professional program

== Transportation ==
=== Bus and rail ===
Local bus service in the San Ramon Valley is provided primarily by County Connection (Central Contra Costa Transit Authority, or CCCTA). The closest Bay Area Rapid Transit station is West Dublin/Pleasanton station, 6 miles (9.7 km) away from San Ramon.

=== Roads ===
The major freeway in the area is Interstate 680. No US highways or California state highways run through San Ramon.

=== Air ===
San Ramon is located near Buchanan Field Airport and Livermore Municipal Airport, though Buchanan Field only flies to destinations in Greater Los Angeles, and Livermore has no regularly scheduled commercial service. The closest airport with regularly scheduled commercial service to domestic and international destinations is Oakland International Airport, though San Francisco International Airport handles the majority of international traffic to San Ramon and the rest of the Bay Area.

== Notable people ==
- Angelina Anderson, professional soccer player
- Mark Appel, former professional baseball pitcher
- David Bingham, former USMNT soccer player
- Tom Burnett, passenger on United Airlines Flight 93
- Colby Buzzell, author, blogger and former United States Army soldier
- Andrew Champion, vocalist for Screw 32, Hopelifter, End Of The World, Shadowboxer, Highwire Days, Dance Hall Crashers and Curse The Cannons
- Austin Hooper, professional football player
- Guy Houston, former member of the California State Assembly and former mayor of Dublin, California
- Marv Hubbard, retired professional American football player
- James Jones, professional football player
- Tarun Karumanchi, MLS player for the Columbus Crew
- David Klech, American decathlete
- Miles Mastrobuoni, professional baseball player for the Seattle Mariners, born in San Ramon
- Auston Matthews, NHL player for the Toronto Maple Leafs, first overall pick in the 2016 NHL draft, born in San Ramon
- Chester McGlockton, NFL player for the Oakland Raiders, Kansas City Chiefs, Denver Broncos, and New York Jets; died in San Ramon
- Remi Prieur, former professional soccer player
- Andre Rawls, former professional soccer player, born in San Ramon
- Eric Reyzelman, professional baseball player, born in San Ramon
- Dennis Richmond, former news anchor for KTVU
- Tiffany Roberts Sahaydak, former USWNT soccer player and current UCF Women's coach
- Tony Stewart, former professional American football player
- Maggie Steffens, gold medal-winning water polo player
- John S. Watson, former CEO of Chevron
- Andrew Wiedeman, former professional soccer player
- Barbara Willis, American ceramic artist
- Max Wittek, American football quarterback, born in San Ramon
- Ryan Wright, professional football player

== See also ==
- List of cities and towns in California
- List of cities and towns in the San Francisco Bay Area
