= Pedro Amador (soldier) =

Spanish sergeant

- Born: Pedro Antonio Amador c. 1735; Cocula, Nueva Galicia
- Died: 8 May 1824 (aged 88-89); San José, Alta California
- Spouses: María de la Luz Ruiz; María Ramona Noriega
- Children: 13

Pedro Antonio Amador (c. 1735 – 8 May 1824) was a Spanish sergeant of the Presidio of Loreto who was present at the establishments of the pueblos of San Diego and Monterey in Alta California.

Amador was born in Cocula, Nueva Galicia (present-day Jalisco, Mexico), the son of José Amador and María Josefa Carpio.

He had two children with his first wife, María de la Luz Ruiz.

Before 1778, at Mission Loreto, he married María Ramona Noriega (ca. 1760-1802), also widow, with whom he had eleven children who were taught to read and write by their mother.

After Ramona's death in 1802, on 12 April 1804, at Mission Santa Clara, he married the also widow Teresa Pinto.

== Descendants ==
His son, José María Amador, became the owner of Rancho San Ramón. Amador County was named in his honor.
