= José María Amador =

Californio soldier, rancher, and gold miner

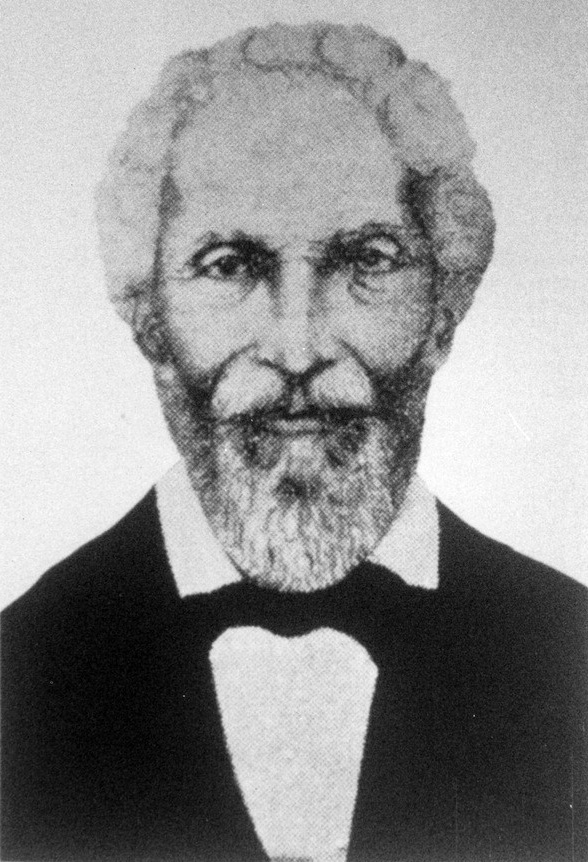
- Born: 1794; San Francisco, California
- Died: 1883 (aged 88–89); Santa Cruz County, California
- Burial place: Gilroy, California
- Occupations: Gold miner, ranchero, soldier

José María Amador (1794 – 1883) was a Californio ranchero, gold miner, and soldier. Amador County and Amador City, both in California's Gold Country, are named after Amador, having found gold there in 1848. He is also the namesake of Amador Valley (home to the cities of Pleasanton and Dublin), a component of the Tri-Valley in Alameda County.

== Biography ==
He was born at the Presidio of San Francisco, one of the youngest of eleven children of Pedro Amador and Ramona Noriega. He very probably named his later ranch after his mother and his maternal grandfather, Ramón Noriega. He was a younger brother of Sinforosa Amador (1788–1841).

He spent his early years as a soldier and explorer, serving in the Spanish army of Nueva España, 1810–1827, then from 1827 to 1835 was mayordomo, or administrator, at the Mission San José. He was granted 4,400 acres of Mission land in 1835, which he named Rancho San Ramon.

Amador was married three times and had 22 children. He built several adobes at his rancho headquarters near Alamilla Springs in today's Dublin, California, including a two-story adobe which was used by James Dougherty in the 1860s, thereafter named Dougherty, Alameda County, California. He gradually sold the land till none was left at his death. His grave stone may be found at Gilroy, California or at the Dublin Heritage Museum and Park.

== Oral history ==
In 1877, he was living at Whiskey Hill, Santa Cruz County when Thomas Savage recorded Amador's “Memorias sobre la Historia de California,” which survives as a manuscript in the Bancroft Library.

== Rancho San Ramon ==
With the cession of California to the United States following the Mexican–American War, the 1848 Treaty of Guadalupe Hidalgo provided that the land grants would be honored. As required by the Land Act of 1851, a claim for Rancho San Ramon was filed with the Public Land Commission in 1852, and 16,517 acres (66.8 km^{2}) of the grant was patented to Jose Maria Amador in 1865. Amador gradually sold his rancho. James Witt Dougherty bought 10,000 acres (40 km^{2}) in 1852.

== Legacy of geographical names ==
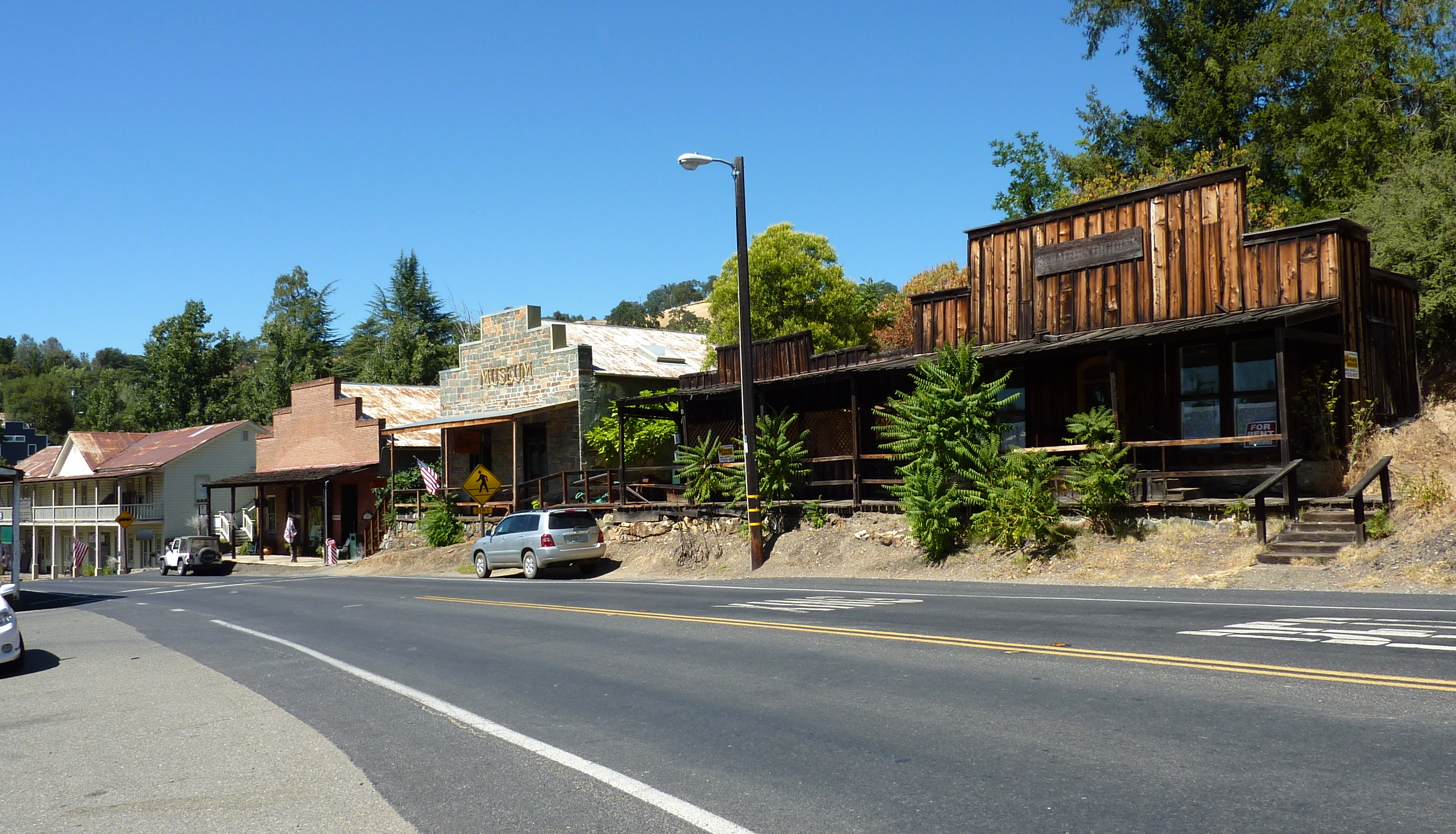
Amador City, California

Amador mined along a nameless creek in 1848 and 1849. His presence gave his surname to the creek, two villages on its banks, and, in 1854, a new county.

There was no settlement where Amador City is now until the summer of 1851, after gold outcroppings had been prospected on both sides of "Amador's Creek", upstream several hundred yards from downtown. The "Original" or "Little" Amador mine and the Spring Hill were probably Amador County's first gold mines. With the discovery of such quartz gold, the settlement that was upstream where the stage road crossed "Amador's creek" or Amador Crossing, gradually moved to "South Amador" or Amador City where French Gulch drains into the creek. The city's most famous and productive mine, the Keystone was organized in 1853 out of two or more claims and before it closed for good in 1942. It produced in intermittent operation about $24 million in gold at much lower gold prices.
