= Rancho San Ramon (Amador) =

Mexican land grant in California

Coordinates: 37.710°N 121.950°W

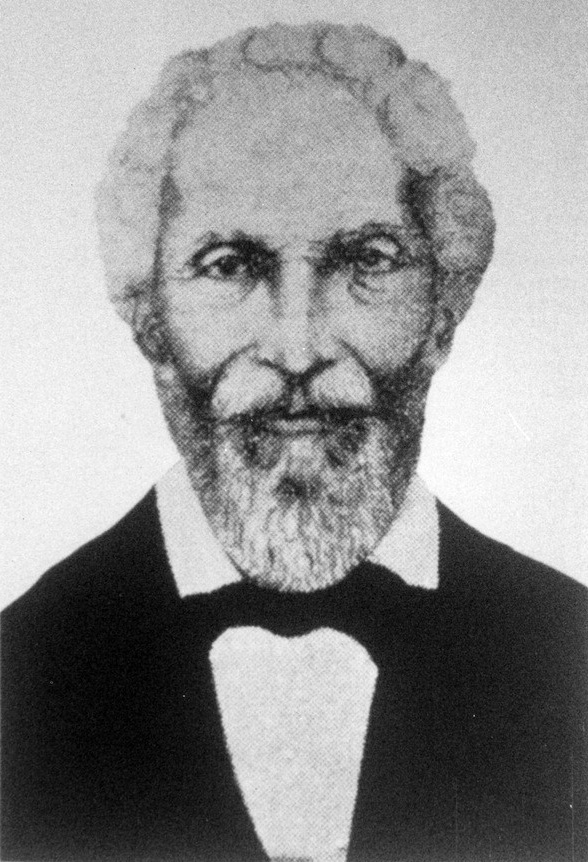
Rancho San Ramon was granted to José María Amador, a Californio miner and ranchero.

Rancho San Ramon (St. Raymond Ranch in Spanish) was a 20,968-acre (84.85 km^{2}) Mexican land grant in the southern San Ramon Valley of present-day Contra Costa County, California. Rancho San Ramon (Pacheco-Castro) was adjacent in the northern San Ramon Valley.

It was given in 1834 by Governor Jose Figueroa to Jose Maria Amador.

The five-square-league (60 square miles) San Ramon grant stretched down the San Ramon Valley from what is now southern Danville on the north to Dublin on the south, and from the crest of the western ridge to the crest of the east, and encompassed present-day Dougherty Valley. The Dublin area was called "Amador" for many years.

== José María Amador ==
José María Amador (1794–1883), born at the Presidio of San Francisco, one of the youngest of eleven children of Pedro Amador and Ramona Noriega. He very probably named his ranch after his mother and his maternal grandfather, Ramón Noriega. He was a younger brother of Sinforosa Amador (1788–1841). Amador County was named in his memory.

He spent his early years as a soldier and explorer, serving in the army of Nueva España, and was later administrator at the Mission San José. Amador was married three times and had 22 children. He built several adobes at his rancho headquarters near Alamilla Springs in today’s Dublin, including a two-story adobe which was used by James Dougherty in the 1860s.

With the cession of California to the United States following the Mexican-American War, the 1848 Treaty of Guadalupe Hidalgo provided that the land grants would be honored. As required by the Land Act of 1851, a claim for Rancho San Ramon was filed with the Public Land Commission in 1852, and 16,517 acres (66.8 km^{2}) of the grant was patented to Jose Maria Amador in 1865. Amador gradually sold his rancho. James Witt Dougherty bought 10,000 acres (40 km^{2}) in 1852.

== San Ramon (Norris) ==
In 1850, Leo and Mary Jane Norris purchased one square league of land on the northwest corner of the rancho from Amador. A claim was filed with the Land Commission in 1852 and 4,451 acres (18.0 km^{2}) was patented to Leo Norris in 1882.

== See also ==
- Ranchos of Contra Costa County, California
- List of ranchos of California
