= Bob Walker (photographer) =

American photographer (1952–1992)

Bob Walker 1952–1992

Robert John Walker (January 6, 1952 – September 19, 1992) was an American photographer and environmental activist based in San Francisco, California. As an activist from 1982 to 1992, he was associated with more than a dozen Bay Area conservation organizations and as a photographer for the East Bay Regional Park District. He contributed to expansion of public protection of important areas of Mt. Diablo and nearby areas.

Born in Syracuse, New York, Walker grew up in Youngstown, Ohio, and graduated from Oberlin College. Migrating to San Francisco after college, he made California the base for the rest of his life. He died at the age of 40 in San Francisco of AIDS-related complications.

== Early life and education ==
Walker grew up and attended public schools in Youngstown, Ohio, where his family had moved from his birthplace of Syracuse, New York. He studied at Oberlin College, graduating in 1974. There he made friends with a mutt he named Dog. After graduation he drove with Dog across country, entering the San Francisco Bay Area through Altamont Pass. He noted that these sensual hills inspired his love for California.

== Photography career ==
In California Walker began his career as a photographer. Poet and friend Jim Mitchell sold Walker his first camera: a Pentax ME. Armed with his new camera, Walker traveled to the East Bay hills to capture the natural beauty of the area. "I do think I can take credit for getting him interested in photography, but the East Bay hills he discovered on his own...", said Mitchell.

Walker had one good eye and only partial use of the other. He took many of his photos in low light with very slow film, a technique that resulted in landscapes with great depth of field. He called the afternoon hour at which he took most of his best photos Magic Hour. At this time of day, Walker took advantage of shadows and contrasting light of the sunset. The San Francisco Bay Guardian commented that his photos, "conjure up the style of the old masters..."

Walker credited a photo taken in winter 1982 as a pivotal point in his photographic career. One stormy day he was hiking in the rain in his favorite park. The sky was completely covered with dark rain clouds above a pastoral landscape of green hills, with Mt. Diablo in the distance. Seeing the sun beginning to break through the clouds, he quickly rushed to the top of the ridge and captured the image, entitling it as Winter Storm over Marsh Creek. He later noted that this was the first time he had envisioned a photo before taking it.

== Activism ==
When a For Sale sign appeared on a property including his favorite landscape, Walker became an activist. After trying to get the attention of local officials, Walker took matters into his own hands. He began leading hikes into the area, presenting slide shows of the landscape, and having participants write postcards to government leaders asking for their support to protect these areas. He also took his photos and slides to the Park District headquarters, working to interest the staff in the area and creating alliances with local officials. He was later hired as photographer and staff for a variety of projects. Eventually, this area was preserved as the first addition to Morgan Territory Regional Preserve in more than a decade.

Walker also became involved with such activist groups as Save Mount Diablo, Greenbelt Alliance, Preserve Area Ridgelands Committee (PARC), the East Bay Area Trails Council, the Save San Francisco Bay Association, and the Sierra Club. He helped lead dozens of activist campaigns and helped gain establishment of the San Francisco Bay Area Ridge Trail.

Walker was a key activist in the creation of the Eastshore State Park, Pleasanton Ridge Regional Preserve, Round Valley Regional Preserve, and the connection of Morgan Territory Regional Preserve to Mt. Diablo State Park. He helped stop construction of proposed landfills at C&H, Marsh Canyon, Garaventa and Round Valley. In addition, he opposed creation of the proposed Buckhorn Reservoir by damming a local creek.

Walker worked to gain passage of the Regional Park District' $225 million open space funding Measure AA in November 1988. This enabled the Regional Park District to expand land holdings in the area from approximately 60,000 to 96,000 acres (24,000 to 39,000 ha) and 1,000 miles (1,600 km) of trail in 2006.

== Honorary areas ==
Walker's favorite place was Morgan Territory Regional Preserve. He had helped to raise funds to acquire land and expand it to more than quadruple in its initial size. A month before his death in September 1992, the East Bay Regional Park District honored him with the naming of a section of Morgan Territory Ridge as "Bob Walker Ridge", and a section of trails as "Bob Walker Regional Trail," both in Morgan Territory Regional Preserve. Walker described the honor as the "proudest moment of my life."

Bob Walker Ridge is a section of Morgan Territory Ridge circled on the east and west by the Volvon Loop Trail, named for the Miwok Bay speaking tribe that occupied this area at the time of European encounter. Crowned with oaks and bays with grassland below on the west side, densely wooded on the east side, the ridge is visible for miles. It has views west to Highland Ridge (much of the scene he depicted in his photo Winter Storm Over Marsh Creek) and north to Black Diamond Mines Regional Preserve. To the east it overlooks Round Valley Regional Preserve and the Los Vaqueros reservoir and watershed, with more distant views across the new Los Meganos State Historic Park, Vasco Caves and Brushy Peak regional preserves, the Sacramento-San Joaquin Delta, and across the Central Valley to the Sierra Nevada mountain range.

Bob Walker Regional Trail stretches from Mt. Diablo State Park within Riggs Canyon across Highland Ridge, down into the Marsh creek drainage and back up and north around the Bob Walker Ridge and finally south to the Preserve main staging area. It overlays sections of the Highland Ridge Trail and the Volvon Loop Trail. Part of it is overlain by the Diablo Trail, which Walker helped create.

== Honorary award ==
For a number of years the Gay-Lesbian Activities Section of the Sierra Club maintained an endowment for a Bob Walker Conservation Award which it presented several times. Eventually the award was discontinued and the endowment was donated to the Oakland Museum to help fund the exhibit "After the Storm: Bob Walker and the Art of Environmental Photography" in 2001.

A new award was created by John Woodbury, executive director of the Bay Area Open Space Council, the Bob Walker Bay Area Open Space Conservation Award which honors an individual who brings diverse people together to advance the cause of land conservation.

== Exhibitions ==
=== After the Storm ===
After the Storm: Bob Walker and the Art of Environmental Photography was an exhibit and retrospective of Bob Walker's work held at the Oakland Museum, "The Museum of California" from March 3, 2001, to June 24, 2001. The exhibit was preceded by and followed by several other locations, including the San Francisco Arts Commission from October 4 – November 18, 2000.

Walker's photographs were exhibited many places during his life. The Oakland Museum retrospective was the first major show about both his work and his activism. Curated by Christopher Beaver, Judy Irving and Ellen Manchester of the Independent Documentary Group, the exhibit placed Walker's work in the context of the history of photography in the environmental movement, demonstrating its relationship to work of such artist/activists as Ansel Adams, Phillip Hyde, Eliot Porter, the Mono Lake Committee and Robert Dawson.

Several rephotographs, by Ellen Manchester and Robert Dawson, of sites photographed by Walker demonstrated the changes that have taken place in the Bay Area landscape. The exhibition also included Walker's photographic equipment, correspondence, maps, field books, scripts, and recordings of talks he presented. A resource center provided brochures and contact information for a variety of Bay Area and Northern California conservation and open space organizations.

=== 2008 Photo exhibit ===
In Our Own Backyard, a posthumous exhibit of previously unexhibited photos from the Bob Walker Collection, which celebrate the East Bay Regional Park District, was held at the Oakland Museum from March 15 to October 12, 2008.

== Books ==
After the Storm, Bob Walker and the East Bay Regional Park District, a collection of Walker's photographs with text written by Christopher Beaver, was published by Wilderness Press in October 2007. It was partially subsidized by the East Bay Regional Park District. A companion exhibition of Walker's photographs was held at the Oakland Museum, where Walker's collection is housed, from March 15 to October 12, 2008, as noted above.

== Quotes from Bob Walker ==
- "Find so" Bob Walker, 1991 (Beaver, Christopher, After the Storm: Bob Walker and the East Bay Regional Park District)
- "With the valleys having fallen to development, our beloved hills now feel the onslaught of the bulldozer, and building pads replace the irreplaceable grandeur of our ridges."
- "The moment that someone is driving down the road and suddenly sees a bulldozer or some grading or a house under construction high in the hills where they never imagined development would take place is the moment they individually cross the line and say to themselves 'this has to be stopped.'" Bob Walker, Contra Costa Times, 8-27-1990.
- "I've really felt evangelical about making people stop and realize that they're in the middle of a very stunning landscape. It's all around them, and so accessible, but often they've overlooked it because California is loaded with so many superlatives." (December 1992, Diablo magazine.)
- "To involve the public, you have to make each of your pictures a thousand times more spectacular than what you might see on the most exquisite day – otherwise you’ll never convey even one-tenth of what it feels like to be out there on the dullest gray day when nothing’s going on." Bob Walker (Beaver, Christopher, After the Storm: Bob Walker and the East Bay Regional Park District)
- "The fundamental dilemma we face is balancing the needs of our natural systems and lands with the impulse to convert that bounty for short term economic gain." Bob Walker (Beaver, Christopher, After the Storm: Bob Walker and the East Bay Regional Park District)
- "We’ve made great strides: vast systems of preserved open space, and laws to protect our air, water, and wetlands. But the losses are cumulative, and the effects, increasingly devastating. . . . The challenge facing us is clearly great, the odds, no better." Bob Walker, speech, Contra Costa Conservation League Award Ceremony, 1991
- "I’d sit with the dog and watch the light dance on the hills around Diablo and dream a very special dream. Wouldn’t it be nice, I thought, if instead of miles of private land and subdivision threats, all the land between Morgan Territory and these beautiful foothills were ours as permanently protected public land." Bob Walker (Beaver, Christopher, After the Storm: Bob Walker and the East Bay Regional Park District)
- "The lesson is quite clear: by joining the knowledge and talents of everyone, weekend hikers, armchair enthusiasts, average citizens and environmental leaders, old groups and new, we can prevail." Bob Walker (Beaver, Christopher, After the Storm: Bob Walker and the East Bay Regional Park District)

== Resources ==
- Homan, Anne Marshall, The Morning Side of Mt. Diablo: An illustrated account of the San Francisco Bay Area's historic Morgan Territory Road Hardscratch Press (2001), includes photos by Bob Walker
- Pollock, Sarah, Paradise Saved, Diablo magazine, Volume 13, No. 12, December 1992
- Beaver, Christopher, After the Storm: Bob Walker and the East Bay Regional Park District, Wilderness Press, Berkeley, CA, November 2007, Text copyright © 2007 by Christopher Beaver; Bob Walker photographs copyright © 2007 by Natural Sciences Division, Oakland Museum of California; Library of Congress Card Number: 2007060409
