= Morgan Territory =

Region in California, US

Coordinates: 37°49′5.92″N 121°47′45.18″W

Morgan Territory is an historic ranching area on the east side of Mount Diablo in San Francisco East Bay's Contra Costa County. It was named after Anglo-American pioneer Jeremiah Morgan, a migrant from Alabama and Iowa who acquired 2,000 acres and developed a ranch here, starting in 1857.

The earliest historic occupants had long been small, highly localized tribes of Native Americans, who spoke dialects of the Bay Miwok language. During the Spanish and Mexican periods, the Native Americans were displaced and colonial governments made large grants of land to high-ranking officials. Americans began to buy such properties after moving into the area in the mid-19th century and later. Ranches for livestock and some farms were developed here.

In the mid-20th century, the large ranch holdings were being sold for suburban residential development. Concerned about the loss of open space, in 1975 the East Bay Regional Park District (EBRPD) acquired 930 acres of land to establish the Morgan Territory Regional Preserve, named for the historic area. During the following decades, it expanded this preserve to protect open space, habitat and watersheds for the public. The preserve now totals 5,230 acres (2,120 ha) in area.

In addition, the adjacent Mount Diablo State Park, established in the 1920s, has been part of a trail network connected to the Morgan Territory Regional Preserve. It acquired management and oversight of properties known as Morgan Ranch and Morgan Red Corral in the late 1980s. These lands are related to Morgan's historic ranch and were held by his descendants into the late 20th century.

== History of Preserve ==
Established in 1976 by the East Bay Regional Park District (EBRPD) as Morgan Territory Regional Preserve, by 2015 this park had been expanded to a total of 5,230 acres (2,120 ha). The Preserve constitutes an important wildlife and recreational corridor. Its area ranges east from Riggs Canyon and Mount Diablo State Park to the Contra Costa Water District's Los Vaqueros watershed and EBRPD's Round Valley Regional Preserve.

The original preserve was defined as fewer than 1000 acres and was located on Morgan Territory Ridge, east of Morgan Territory Road, and included the headwaters of Marsh Creek. In the late 1980s, it was expanded across the parallel Highland Ridge west of the road and into Riggs Canyon.

Morgan Territory's sandstone hills include the headwaters of Marsh and Tassajara creeks. According to the EBRPD, more than 90 species of wildflowers grow in Morgan Territory Regional Preserve. Particularly notable are the Diablo sunflower Helianthella castanea and Diablo manzanita, which are native to the foothills of Mount Diablo. Fauna include deer, coyote, an occasional mountain lion, and golden eagles. The preserve has expansive views to Mt. Diablo and Mount St. Helena to the north, and the Sierra Nevada range to the east.

Preserve trails are named for regional Native American peoples, such as the Volvon (one of five tribes in the Mt. Diablo area who spoke dialects of the Bay Miwok language); animals such as condor (molluk), prairie falcon, eagle and coyote; and for natural features related to the preserve's ranching history (Valley View, Blue Oak, and Highland Ridge).

Popular activities in the park are camping, hiking, horseback riding, and picnicking. A reservation is required to use the backpacking campsite, which is not wheelchair accessible. Picnic sites cannot be reserved. Dogs are allowed and no fee is charged for their admittance.

=== Additional features of the Preserve ===
The Morgan Backpack Camp was constructed in 2001 on the Highland Ridge Trail, a section of the Diablo Trail, at the former Cardoza homesite.

Morgan Sulfur Spring is in lower Curry Canyon of this Regional Preserve. It is located in lower Sulfur Spring Canyon and drains from Windy Point to Curry Creek. It may have been named by Mary Bowerman, who designated it as "Morgan Sulphur Spring".

== Related protected areas ==
- Morgan Ranch - In 1989, Save Mount Diablo bought the 631-acre (2.6 km²) Morgan Ranch from Willard "Bill" Morgan and his wife Naomi; Bill is a great-grandson of settler Jeremiah Morgan. The non-profit transferred the ranch to Mt. Diablo State Park for management. This was the first and corner connection to Morgan Territory Regional Preserve. The Morgan Ranch extends from Marsh Creek over Highland Ridge, and descends west to Tassajara Creek in Riggs Canyon.
- Morgan Red Corral - In 2004, Save Mount Diablo acquired the "Morgan Red Corral", another portion of the historic ranch, and transferred it to Mt. Diablo State Park. Located across Morgan Territory Road from the Morgan Ranch, it now serves as a staging area for this easternmost part of the State Park. In 2004 Save Mount Diablo honored Jeremiah Morgan by installing an historic monument about his role at the Morgan Red Corral property on Morgan Territory Road.
- Joseph Galvin Ranch and 20-acre Moss Rock, acquired by Save Mount Diablo, were transferred by the non-profit in January 2012 to East Bay Regional Park District for long-term management and public access.
