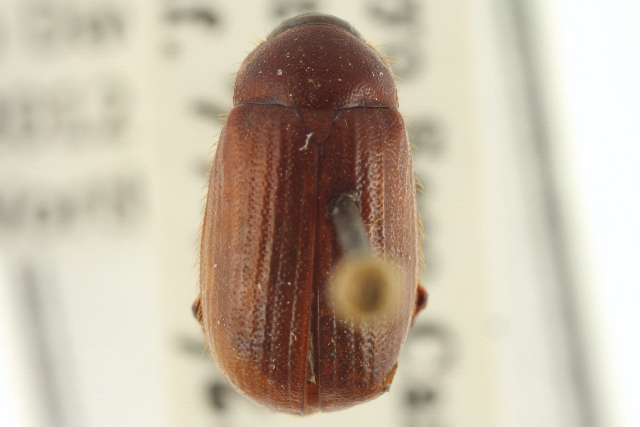

Scientific classification
- Kingdom: Animalia
- Phylum: Arthropoda
- Class: Insecta
- Order: Coleoptera
- Suborder: Polyphaga
- Infraorder: Scarabaeiformia
- Family: Scarabaeidae
- Genus: Serica
- Species: S. diablo

Binomial name
- Serica diablo Dawson, 1967

= Serica diablo =

Species of beetle

Serica diablo is a species of beetle of the family Scarabaeidae. It is found in the United States (California).

== Description ==
Adults reach a length of about 7 mm. The colour is drk castaneus. The surface is bare and shining, and finely, rather evenly and densely punctate.

== Etymology ==
The species is named after its type locality, Mount Diablo.
