= Vasco Caves Regional Preserve =

- Interactive map of Vasco Caves Regional Preserve
- Location: Mount Diablo; Contra Costa County, California
- Nearest city: Brentwood, California, U.S.
- Coordinates: 37.805°N 121.687°W
- Area: 1,644 acres (665 ha)
- Created: 1989
- Operator: East Bay Regional Park District
- Status: Restricted access (via guided tours only)

Vasco Caves Regional Preserve is a natural and cultural protected area located on the eastern slope of Mount Diablo, on Vasco Road within eastern Contra Costa County, California. It was created to preserve wildlife habitats, California chaparral and woodlands, native plant communities, and Native American rock art.

== History ==
The property was jointly purchased by the East Bay Regional Park District (EBRPD) and the Contra Costa Water District (CCWD), in the Diablo Range between Brentwood and Livermore, California. The first acquisition of land for Vasco Caves Regional Preserve occurred in 1989.

On December 15, 2009, the two agencies agreed to buy 1,644 acres (665 hectares) of property adjacent to the Vasco Caves. The purchase price was US$2.924 million but excluded mineral, wind rights, and wind turbine revenues. The property was previously owned by Vaquero Farms Conservation LLC and has 190 wind turbines owned by Tres Vaqueros Wind Farms and North Wind Energy. The new Vaquero Farms tract will not be open for public access but will be held in land bank status because of sensitive wildlife habitat and ongoing wind turbine operations.

== Features ==
The preserve contains some spectacular rock outcroppings. On top of the rocks, there are vernal pools that are habitats for the long-horned fairy shrimp (Anostraca). Nearby are natural springs which harbor the red-legged frog. Other wildlife is frequently seen, including kit fox, coyote, and raptors such as eagles and hawks.

=== Ceremonial site ===
The area is thought to have been a ceremonial site used by the native peoples of the region. Archaeological explorations have revealed cave art dating back over 10,000 years. The art features images of birds. In the rock are many deeply carved bedrock mortar holes, used for food preparation. Between 700 BC and AD 300, these caves and the nearby area was an Ohlone village called Chitactac.

== Admission ==
The preserve is not open to casual visits by the public, with access limited to guided tours only via reservation.
