= Morgan Territory Regional Preserve =

Regional park in Contra Costa County, California, USA

Coordinates: 37°49′5.92″N 121°47′45.18″W

- Interactive map of Morgan Territory Regional Preserve
- Location: Contra Costa County, California
- Nearest city: Clayton, California and Livermore, California
- Area: 5,230 acres (2,120 ha)
- Created: 1975
- Operator: East Bay Regional Park District

Morgan Territory Regional Preserve is a regional park in Contra Costa County, California. Located east of Clayton and north of Livermore, California, bordering on Mt. Diablo State Park, it is part of the East Bay Regional Park District (EBRPD). The preserve was founded in 1975 with fewer than 1,000 acres (400 ha), but EBRPD has gradually acquired more property, and, since 2015, the preserve encompasses 5,230 acres (2,120 ha). The main access roads run from Livermore and Clayton.

The preserve was named for Morgan Territory, an historic name for the area associated with Anglo-American pioneer Jeremiah Morgan, who in 1856 acquired thousands of acres on the east side of Mount Diablo and developed a ranch.

Popular activities in the park are camping, hiking, horseback riding and picnicking. A reservation is required to use the backpacking campsite. This is not wheelchair accessible. Picnic sites are first come, first served. Dogs are allowed in the preserve and no fee is charged for their admittance.

== Geography ==
=== General description ===
Morgan Territory Regional Preserve now totals 5,230 acres (2,120 ha) and is one of the larger EBRPD (East Bay Regional Park District) holdings. The preserve extends on both sides of a creek. When developed parallel to the creek in 1892, Morgan Territory Road was named for pioneer Jeremiah Morgan's ranch. Today many of the preserve's trails branch off from this main road into the surrounding hills.

=== Nearby parks ===
Other trails lead toward Mount Diablo State Park, which is adjacent to a portion of the Regional Preserve. On the west side of the preserve, trails connect to Los Vaqueros Watershed. However, a permit from the Reservoir is required to access this protected watershed.

=== Trails and staging areas ===
There is one main staging area, which is located at a pass with an elevation of 2,030 feet (620 m). The Volvon Trail follows a ridge from this pass, maintaining an elevation of about 1,900 feet (580 m). The highest point in the park is on Highland Ridge, at an elevation of 2,317 feet (706 m).

There are camping areas where water is available and restrooms are located. Apart from the main staging area, an area with restrooms and a camping/picnic area can be found on Roger Epperson Ridge along the Highland Ridge Trail.

=== Flora and fauna ===
According to the EBRPD, more than 90 species of wildflowers grow in Morgan Territory Regional Preserve. Particularly notable is the Diablo sunflower Helianthella castanea, which is native to the foothills of Mount Diablo. Fauna include deer, coyote, and occasionally a mountain lion.

== History ==
=== Early years ===
This area on the east side of Mount Diablo was historically the homeland of the Volvon, one of five tribes in the region who spoke dialects of the Bay Miwok language and were encountered by Spanish explorers. The Spanish began exploring and colonizing the area east of San Francisco Bay in 1772, which resulted in wholesale changes to the world of the Volvon and other regional tribes.

Some members of the native tribes were killed outright by Spanish military confrontations. Others were relocated into Catholic missions and forced to change their traditional ways. Unsanitary conditions at the missions and exposure to new infectious diseases carried by the foreigners caused the deaths of many Native Americans. Most of the native resistance to the way of life which the Spaniards imposed ended around 1806.

Meanwhile, the King of Spain began dividing the land into enormous parcels that were granted to friends and supporters. Few of these grantees resided on their new grants, but subdivided them into smaller parcels which they gave or sold to others. After Mexico gained independence from Spain in 1821, it continued the practice of granting large ranchos to Californios on Bay Miwok homelands, beginning in the 1820s. Such lands were increasingly acquired by American immigrants from the United States, such as John Marsh in 1837 and Jeremiah Morgan in 1856.

The United States acquired California after defeating Mexico in the Mexican-American War of 1848. Jeremiah Morgan, a native of Alabama, had migrated to Iowa. He went to California in 1849 in the gold rush. He worked briefly as a miner before returning to Iowa for his family. He returned with them to California in 1853. Acquiring land in 1856, he started a ranch on the east side of Mount Diablo in 1857. Because he eventually owned 2000 acres and was established in the area, this part of the mountain became known as Morgan Territory after him.

=== Recent years ===
In 1975 the East Bay Regional Park District (EBRPD) acquired about 930 acres (380 ha) of property and established Morgan Territory Regional Preserve, to protect open space from development. Gradually the EBRPD acquired other properties through the decades and expanded the preserve. On April 17, 2015, BRPD announced that it had added a 260 acres (110 ha) parcel of land, formerly called the Viera farm, to the Morgan Territory Regional Preserve. This parcel is also adjacent to Mount Diablo State Park. This acquisition brought the total Morgan Territory Regional Preserve area to 5,230 acres (2,120 ha).

==== History of creation of the preserve ====
In the late 1960s and early 1970s, Manfred "Manny" Lindner of the Contra Costa Park Council helped lead efforts to establish a new regional preserve in Morgan Territory within the East Bay Regional Park District (EBRPD). To illustrate the proposal, he built a large, three-dimensional model of the main ridge and headwaters of Marsh Creek, which were the most prized areas. Hulet Hornbeck, Chief of Acquisitions for the EBRPD, collaborated with Lindner to persuade the District Board of Directors to create the Preserve. But many residents of the area had demonstrated little public interest or need of such a plan.

At the same time, some residents recognized the development pressures on the area and began to organize community groups to preserve natural areas. For instance, the non-profit Save Mount Diablo was founded in 1971. The population of the nearby Tri-Valley had already begun to increase, a trend that continued in the following decades, driven by expansion of technology firms and related businesses in the Silicon Valley and region. Land prices also increased throughout the area.

In the late 1980s and early 1990s, Bob Walker (1952-1992), an environmentalist, photographer, and president of the Sierra Club San Francisco Bay Chapter for a period, led efforts to expand the preserve from its initial 970 acres (3.9 km²). Walker was active on the Board of Directors of Save Mount Diablo. Bob Walker Ridge (a section of Morgan Territory Ridge) and of the Bob Walker Regional Trail (overlaying sections of the Highland Ridge and Diablo trails) were named in his honor in the preserve.

In this same period, the state expanded Mount Diablo State Park to the east to join with the Preserve in Riggs Canyon.

Serving with Walker was Robert Doyle, president of Save Mount Diablo. He had succeeded Hornbeck as Assistant General Manager and Chief of Acquisitions for the East Bay Regional Park District. Doyle and Walker strategized about developing public support to expand the Preserve from its original 970 acres (3.9 km²). In 1987 EBRPD acquired the square-mile Marshall property, adding it to the Preserve. Seth Adams, staff for Save Mount Diablo, aided Walker and Doyle in the long-term goal to protect natural areas in the region.

In 1989 Save Mount Diablo bought the 631-acre (2.6 km²) Morgan Territory Ranch from descendants of the pioneer settler, placed a conservation easement on it, and transferred the property to Mt. Diablo State Park for management. The ranch is adjacent to a corner of the Morgan Territory Preserve. Following that, in 1994 the state created the 30-mile (48 km) Diablo Trail, which runs across six parks from Walnut Creek to Brentwood.

In quick succession EBRPD acquired large, square-mile sections and added them to the Morgan Territory Preserve. In this same period, they preserved the 19,000-acre (77 km²) Los Vaqueros watershed to the east. EBRPD also acted to designate Round Valley as an adjoining Regional Preserve. It had been threatened by proposals by Contra Costa County to establish a landfill here.

On April 17, 2015, EBRPD announced that it had acquired and added a 260 acres (110 ha) parcel of land, formerly known as the Viera farm, to the Morgan Territory Regional Preserve. The parcel is adjacent to Mount Diablo State Park.

Prolonged heavy rains during the winter of 2016-2017 caused significant flooding and damage to park facilities, especially roads and trails. EBRPD posted a notice on its website that the Morgan Territory Backpack Camp would be closed from November 1, 2017 through March 1, 2018, for repairs, but favorable weather allowed completion of the needed work to be completed earlier than expected. EBRPD announced on December 5, 2017 that the Morgan Territory Backpack Camp was reopened.

== See also ==
Morgan Territory
