= Round Valley Regional Preserve =

Park in Contra Costa County, California

- Interactive map of Round Valley Regional Preserve
- Location: Contra Costa County, California
- Nearest city: Brentwood, California
- Coordinates: 37.8594°N 121.7708°W
- Area: 1,911 acres (773 ha)
- Created: 1988
- Operator: East Bay Regional Park District (EBRPD)

Round Valley Regional Preserve is a regional park just outside Antioch, CA and Brentwood, CA that is part of the East Bay Regional Parks (EBRPD) system. It is on Marsh Creek Road, approximately 5.2 miles (8.4 km) west of the intersection with Vasco Road. The park was begun in 1988, when Jim Murphy sold 700 acres (280 ha) of land to EBRPD. The land originally belonged to Mr. Davis' grandfather Thomas Murphy, an Irish immigrant, who had purchased the land in 1878 for a farming and ranching operation. The preserve has since expanded to encompass 1,911 acres (773 ha).

The Round Valley parking area is one of the two staging areas and points of departure for tour buses that carry passengers into Vasco Caves Regional Preserve. Morgan Territory Regional Preserve adjoins Round Valley Regional Preserve on the Southwest. The park is near the edge of the Diablo Range, and its wooded hills are a sharp contrast with the almost treeless flat land of the Central Valley, which begins a few miles farther east.

== Wildlife ==
The preserve is habitat for a variety of species. Mammals include the California ground squirrel, San Joaquin pocket mouse, Audubon's or desert cottontails, and the endangered San Joaquin kit fox. Round Valley is one of the northern extremes of the kit fox range in California. Birds include golden eagles and the burrowing owl, both of which are a state "Species of Special Concern."

Due to the sensitivity of the wildlife habit at Round Valley, dogs are not permitted in the preserve. Signs are posted.

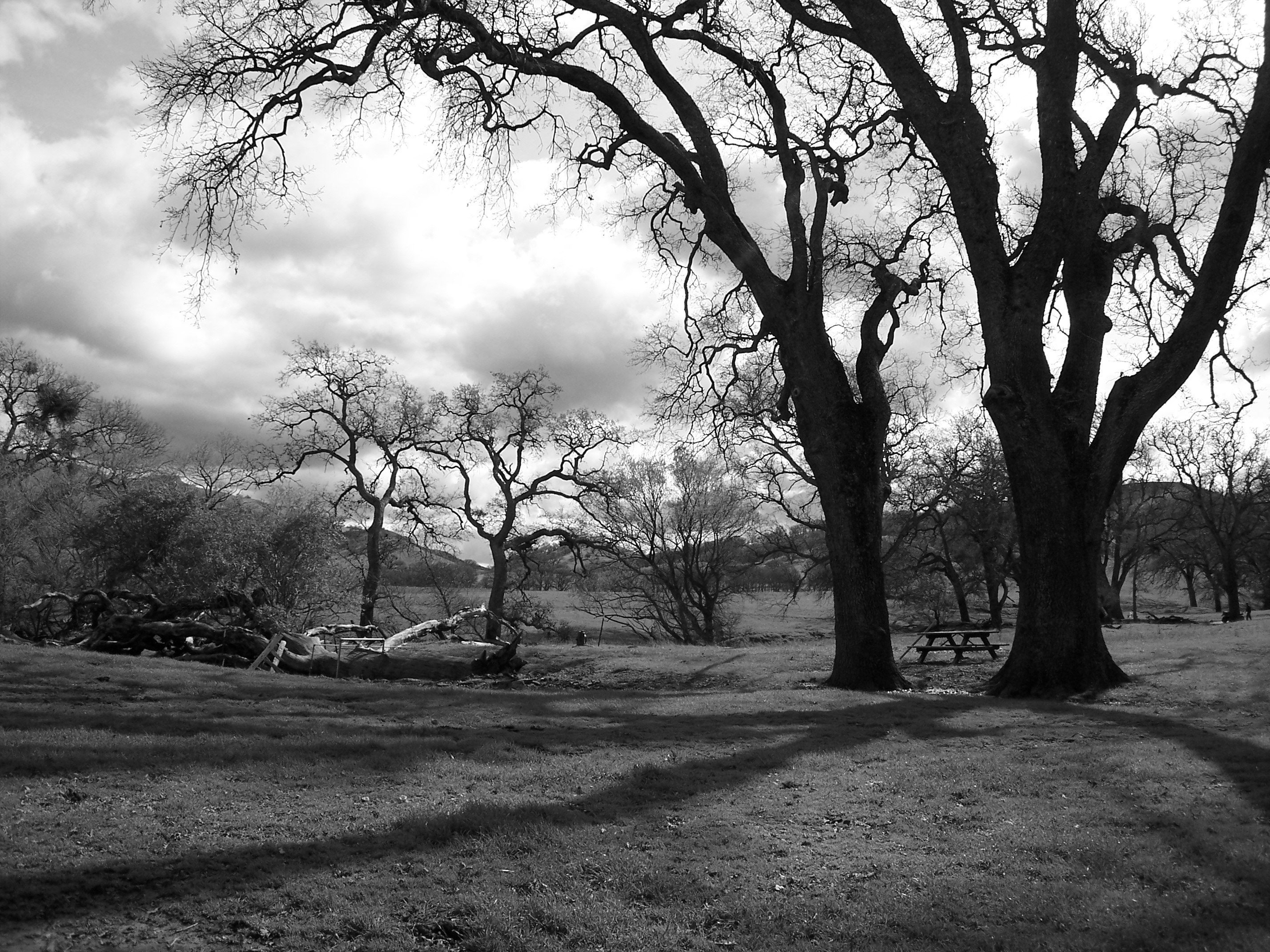
Round Valley Regional Park View March 6, 2009

== Activities ==
The preserve is open to hiking, horseback riding and bicycling (with some limitations). There is one group camping site.

The Round Valley parking area is one of the two staging areas and points of departure for tour buses that carry passengers into Vasco Caves Regional Preserve for pre-reserved tours. (Note: Visitors are only allowed into the Vasco Caves preserve on ranger-guided tours. Call 1-888-EBPARKS for more information.) The other staging area is at Brushy Peak Regional Preserve.

== Trails ==
There are two important trails in the park. Hardy Canyon Trail is about 3 miles (4.8 km) long, beginning just after the hiker crosses the Marsh Creek bridge near the parking lot, which is just off Marsh Creek Road. This is the more scenic of the two main trails. It starts in a small oak grove and rises to an open, grassy area on the south side of the preserve that provides very good views of Round Valley, and is nearly all single-track. The trail descends into Round Valley and terminates at Miwok Trail, the second major trail in the preserve. Turning right, hikers can return to the parking lot via Miwok Trail, about 1.3 miles (2.1 km).
