= Mount Diablo =

Mountain in California, US

- Cerro Alto de los Bolbones
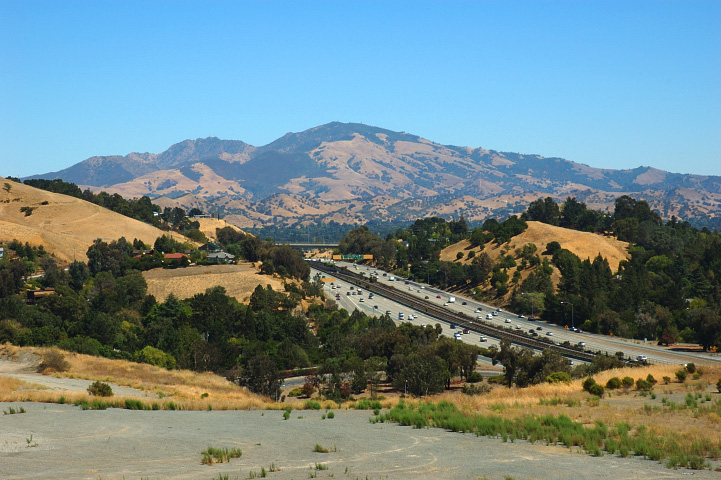
- West face of Mount Diablo and Hwy 24

Highest point
- Elevation: 3,849 ft (1,173 m) NAVD 88
- Prominence: 3,109 ft (948 m)
- Listing: California county high points 45th
- Coordinates: 37°52′54″N 121°54′51″W

Naming
- Native name: tuyshtak (Northern Ohlone); oj·ompil·e (Northern Sierra Miwok); supemenenu (Central Sierra Miwok); sukkú jaman (Nisenan)

Geography
- Location within California Location within the United States
- Location: Contra Costa County, California, U.S.
- Parent range: Diablo Range
- Topo map: USGS Clayton

Geology
- Rock age(s): Cretaceous, Jurassic
- Mountain type: Sedimentary

Climbing
- Easiest route: Paved road

U.S. National Natural Landmark
- Designated: 1982

California Historical Landmark
- Reference no.: 905

Mount Diablo is a mountain of the Diablo Range, in Contra Costa County of the eastern San Francisco Bay Area in Northern California. It is south of Clayton and northeast of Danville. It is an isolated upthrust peak of 3,849 feet (1,173 meters), visible from most of the San Francisco Bay Area. Mount Diablo appears from many angles to be a double pyramid and has many subsidiary peaks. The largest and closest is North Peak, the other half of the double pyramid, which is nearly as high in elevation at 3,557 feet (1,084 m), and is about one mile (1.6 kilometers) northeast of the main summit.

The mountain is within the boundaries of Mount Diablo State Park, which is administered by California State Parks.

== Geography ==
The summit is accessible by foot, bicycle, or motor vehicle. Road access is via North Gate Road or South Gate Road.

=== Mount Diablo State Park ===
The peak is in Mount Diablo State Park, a state park of about 20,000 acres (8,000 hectares). The state park was the first public open space established on or near the peak. According to the non-profit Save Mount Diablo, there are now varied types of protected lands on and around Mount Diablo that total more than 90,000 acres (36,000 ha). These include 38 preserves, such as nearby city open spaces, regional parks, and watersheds, which are buffered in some areas with private lands that have been protected by conservation easements.

=== Viewshed ===
On a clear day, the Sierra Nevada range is plainly visible from the summit. The best views are after a winter storm; a snowy Sierra shows up better, and summer days are likely to be hazy. Lassen Peak, 181 miles (291 kilometers) away, is occasionally just visible over the curve of the earth. Sentinel Dome in Yosemite National Park is visible, but Half Dome is hidden by the 8000-foot ridge at 37.755N 119.6657W. Eight bridges are visible, from left to right (southwest to northeast): San Mateo, Bay, Golden Gate, San Rafael, Carquinez, Benicia, Antioch, and Rio Vista.

Many peaks in the state are taller, but Mount Diablo has a remarkable visual prominence for a mountain of such low elevation. Its looming presence over much of the Bay Area, delta, and Central Valley, and good visibility even from the Mother Lode, all key regions during the gold rush and early statehood, made it an important landmark for mapping and navigation. The summit is used as the reference datum for land surveying in much of northern California and Nevada.

It boasts one of the largest viewsheds in the Western United States and played a key role in California history.

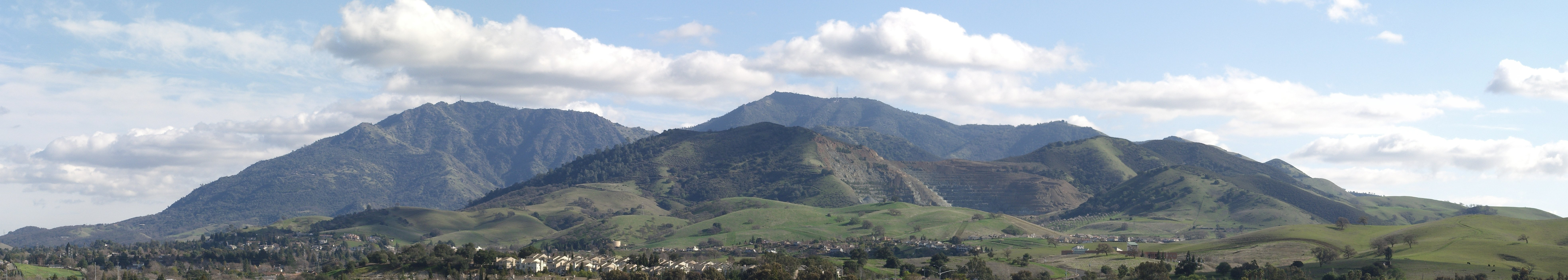
View of Mount Diablo from Concord: north peak (left), Mount Zion (center), and main peak (right),

== Cultural history ==
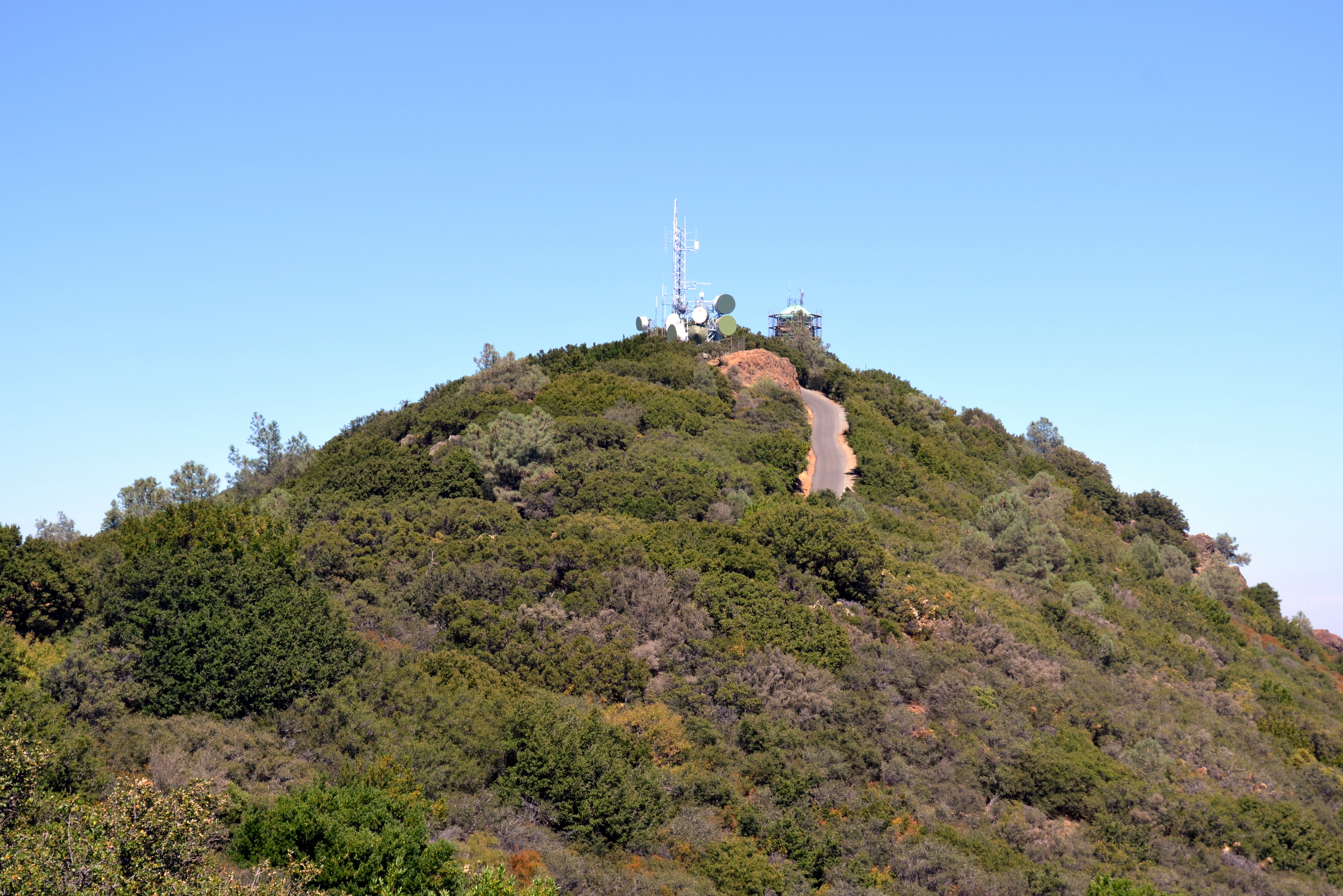
The summit of Mount Diablo

Mount Diablo is sacred to many California Native American peoples. According to Miwok mythology and Ohlone mythology, it was the point of creation. The local peoples of the area traditionally had a variety of creation narratives associated with the mountain. In one surviving narrative fragment, Mount Diablo and Reed's Peak (Mount Tamalpais) were surrounded by water; from these two islands the creator Coyote and his assistant Eagle-man made Native American people and the world. In another, Molok the Condor brought forth his grandson Wek-Wek the Falcon Hero, from within the mountain.

=== Earliest names ===
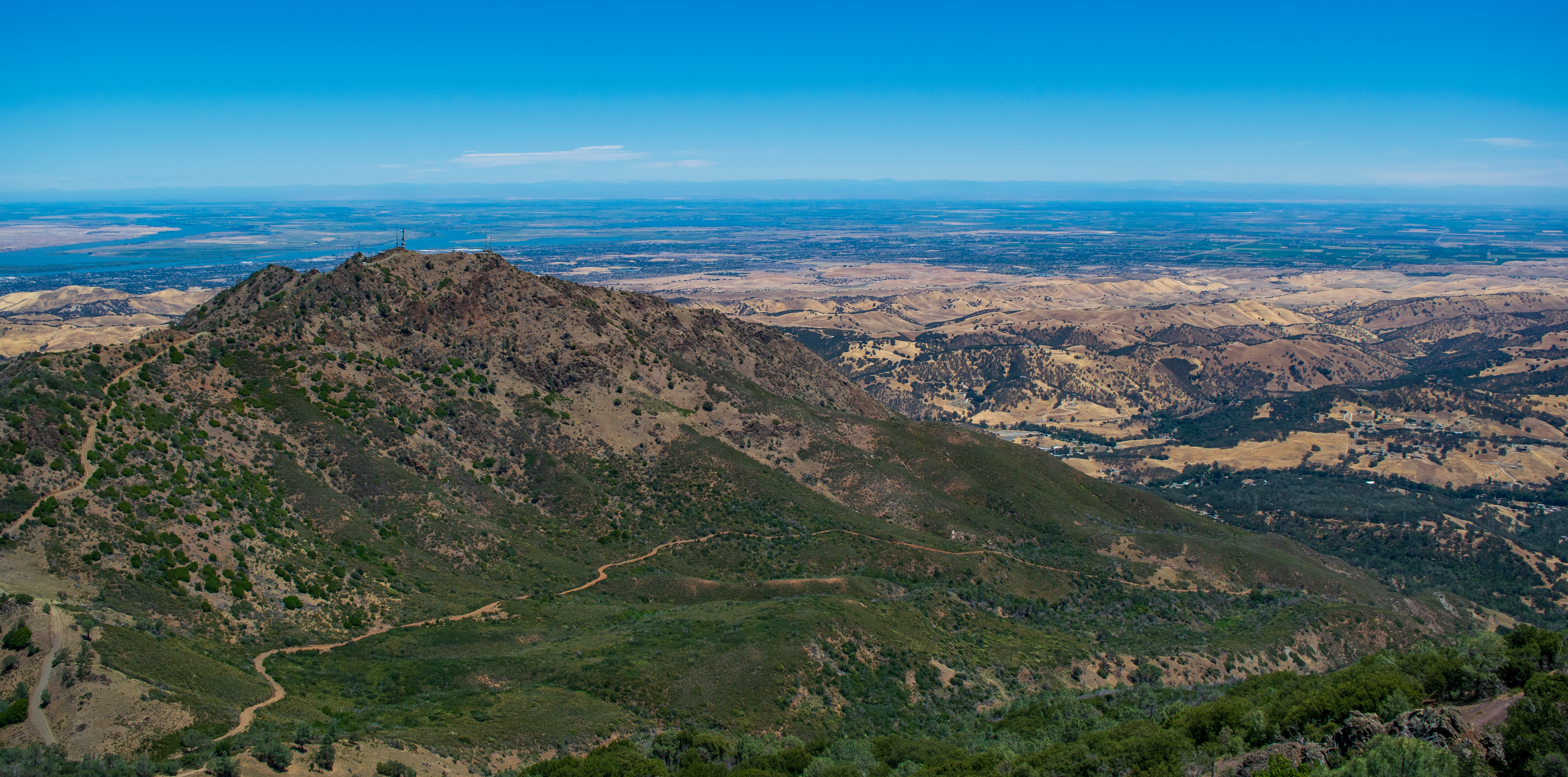
View of Mount Diablo's North Peak from the main peak

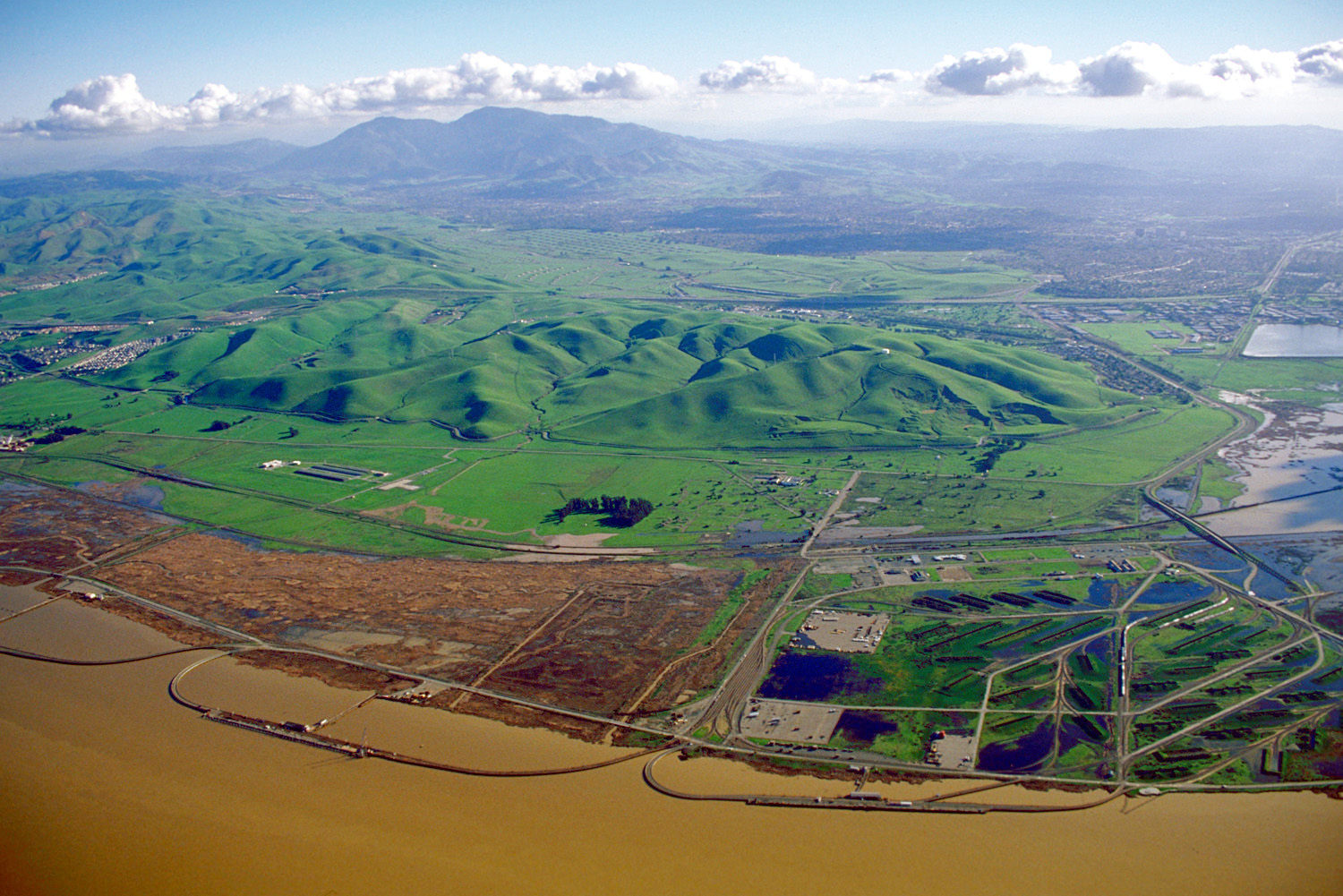
Aerial view of the Los Medanos foothills and Mount Diablo from over Suisun Bay at Concord, California

About 25 independent tribal groups with well-defined territories lived in the East Bay countryside surrounding the mountain at time of European contact. Their members spoke dialects of three distinct languages: Ohlone, Bay Miwok, and Northern Valley Yokuts. The Chochenyo-speaking Ohlone from Mission San Jose and the East Bay area, call the mountain Tuyshtak, meaning "at the dawn of time". Further inland, the Nisenan of the Sacramento Valley call it Sukkú Jaman, "dog mountain"; because, as Nisenan elder Dalbert Castro once explained, it's "the place where dogs came from in trade". A Southern Sierra Miwok name for the mountain is Supemenenu, and a Northern Sierra Miwok name is Oj·ompil·e.

It has also been suggested that another early Native American name for the mountain was Kawukum or Kahwookum, but there is no evidence to confirm the assertion. According to Indian historian Bev Ortiz and Save Mount Diablo: "The name Kahwookum was made up in 1866 — with no real Native American connection — referred to the California Legislature's Committee on Public Morals, and tabled. It resurfaced as a real estate gimmick in 1916 with a supposed new translation, "Laughing Mountain", attributed without documentation to Diablo area Volvon Indians.

Most of Mount Diablo, including its peak, was within the homeland of the early Volvon (sometimes spelled Wolwon, Bolbon or Bolgon), a Bay Miwok–speaking tribe. As early as 1811, Spanish colonists referred to the mountain as Cerro Alto de los Bolbones ("High Hill of the Volvon") or sometimes Sierra de los Bolgones.

=== Current name ===
The conventional view is that the peak derives its name from the reaction of Spanish soldiers to the 1805 escape of several Chupcan Native Americans in a willow thicket some seven miles (11 km) north of the mountain. One story tells that their nighttime escape through the thicket was aided by mysterious lights. An 1850 report by General Mariano G. Vallejo tells of a strange dancing spirit turning the battle in favor of the Chupcan. Vallejo interpreted the natives' word for the personage, puy, to mean "devil" in the Anglo-American language. Vallejo's report could be interpreted to align with Edward G. Gudde's history of place names. (Kyle, and Ortiz)

By 1824, the region north of the mountain came to be known as Monte del Diablo (Spanish pronunciation: [/ˈmonte ðel ˈdjaβlo/] MON-teh dehl DYAH-bloh) meaning "devil's thicket." In this case monte should be translated as thicket or dense woods. It was shown on maps near present-day Concord (formerly known as Pacheco). Later, U.S. settlers understood "Monte" to refer directly to the mountain, and it was recorded with varying degrees of certainty until "Mount Diablo" became official in 1850.

In May 1862, California Geological Survey field director William H. Brewer named the northeast peak of Mount Diablo "Mount King", after Rev. Thomas Starr King, a Unitarian clergyman, abolitionist, Republican, Yosemite advocate, cultural Unionist, and California's leading intellectual. Today it is known as North Peak.

=== Early uses ===
In 1851 the south peak of the mountain was selected by Colonel Leander Ransom as the initial point—where the Mount Diablo Base and Mount Diablo Meridian lines intersect—for cadastral surveys of a large area. Subsequent surveys in much of California, Nevada and Oregon were located with reference to this point.

Toll roads up the mountain were created in 1874 by Joseph Seavey Hall and William Camron (sometimes "Cameron"); Hall's Mount Diablo Summit Road was officially opened on May 2, 1874. Camron's "Green Valley" road opened later. Hall also built the 16-room Mountain House Hotel near the junction of the two roads, a mile below the summit (2,500 foot elevation. (It operated through the 1880s, was abandoned in 1895, and burned c. 1901). As far north as Meridian Road, on the outskirts of Chico, California, the summit was used as a reference point. The road is colinear with the summit, and is named for the meridian which intersects it.

An aerial navigation beacon, the Standard Diablo tower, was erected by Standard Oil at the summit in 1928. The 10-million-candlepower beacon became known as the "Eye of Diablo" and was visible for a hundred miles. From 1954–1957, Mount Diablo was used for broadcasting purposes by radio station KSBR-FM and television station KOVR (channel 13, Stockton).

=== Protection of the area ===
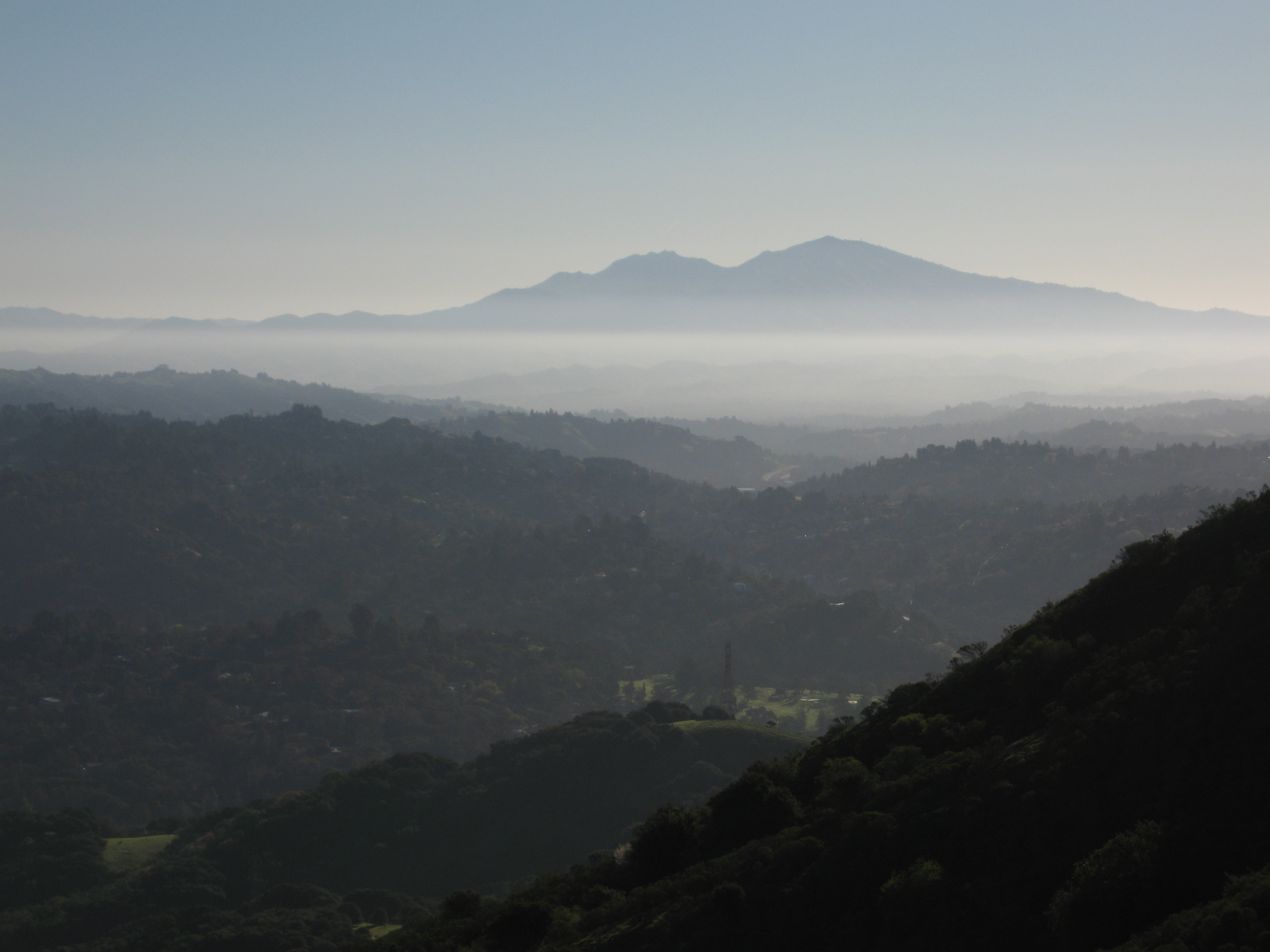
Mount Diablo from the Berkeley–Oakland hills

After initial legislation in 1921, the state of California acquired enough land in 1931 to create a small state park around the peak. Many improvements were carried out in the 1930s by the Civilian Conservation Corps, but park expansion slowed in the 1940s through the 1960s.

Significantly, botanist Mary Leolin Bowerman (1908–2005), founder of the Save Mount Diablo non-profit in 1971, published her Ph.D. dissertation in 1936 at the University of California, Berkeley. In 1944 she published her book, The Flowering Plants and Ferns of Mount Diablo, California. Her study boundaries became the basis for the state park's first map and for the park's eventual expansion. Her work also became the origin of many of the park's place names.

This state park has been greatly expanded over the decades. Soon after Earth Day in 1971, the nonprofit organization "Save Mount Diablo" was created by co-founders Mary Bowerman and Art Bonwell, barely ahead of real estate developers. At the time, the state park included just 6,788 acres (2,747 ha) and was the only park in the vicinity of the mountain. In 2007 the state park totaled almost 20,000 acres (8,100 ha), and with 38 parks and preserves on and around the mountain, Diablo's public lands total more than 90,000 acres (36,000 ha). According to Save Mount Diablo, there are 50 individual preserves on and around Mount Diablo, some of which are conservation easements covering a single parcel, others are expected to eventually be absorbed into larger nearby parks. As of December 2007, the organization recognizes 38 specific Diablo parks and preserves.

The State Park adjoins park lands of the East Bay Regional Park District, including Morgan Territory Regional Preserve, Brushy Peak Regional Preserve, Vasco Caves Regional Preserve, and Round Valley Regional Preserve. It also adjoins protected areas owned or controlled by local cities such as the Borges Ranch Historic Farm, the Concord Naval Weapons Station (now in the process of being converted to non military use), Indian Valley, Shell Ridge Open Space and Lime Ridge Open Spaces near the city of Walnut Creek, and east to the Los Vaqueros Reservoir watershed. The new Marsh Creek State Park (Note: formerly known as Cowell Ranch State Park.) and Black Diamond Mines Regional Preserve are among the open spaces stretching to the north. In this way the open spaces controlled by cities, the East Bay Regional Park District, Mount Diablo State Park, and various regional preserves now adjoin and protect much of the elevated regions of the mountain. There are unprotected areas in Arroyo del Cerro, Curry Canyon, the Marsh creek region, and on the northern slopes of North Peak, and in a number of inholdings surrounded by preserve land.

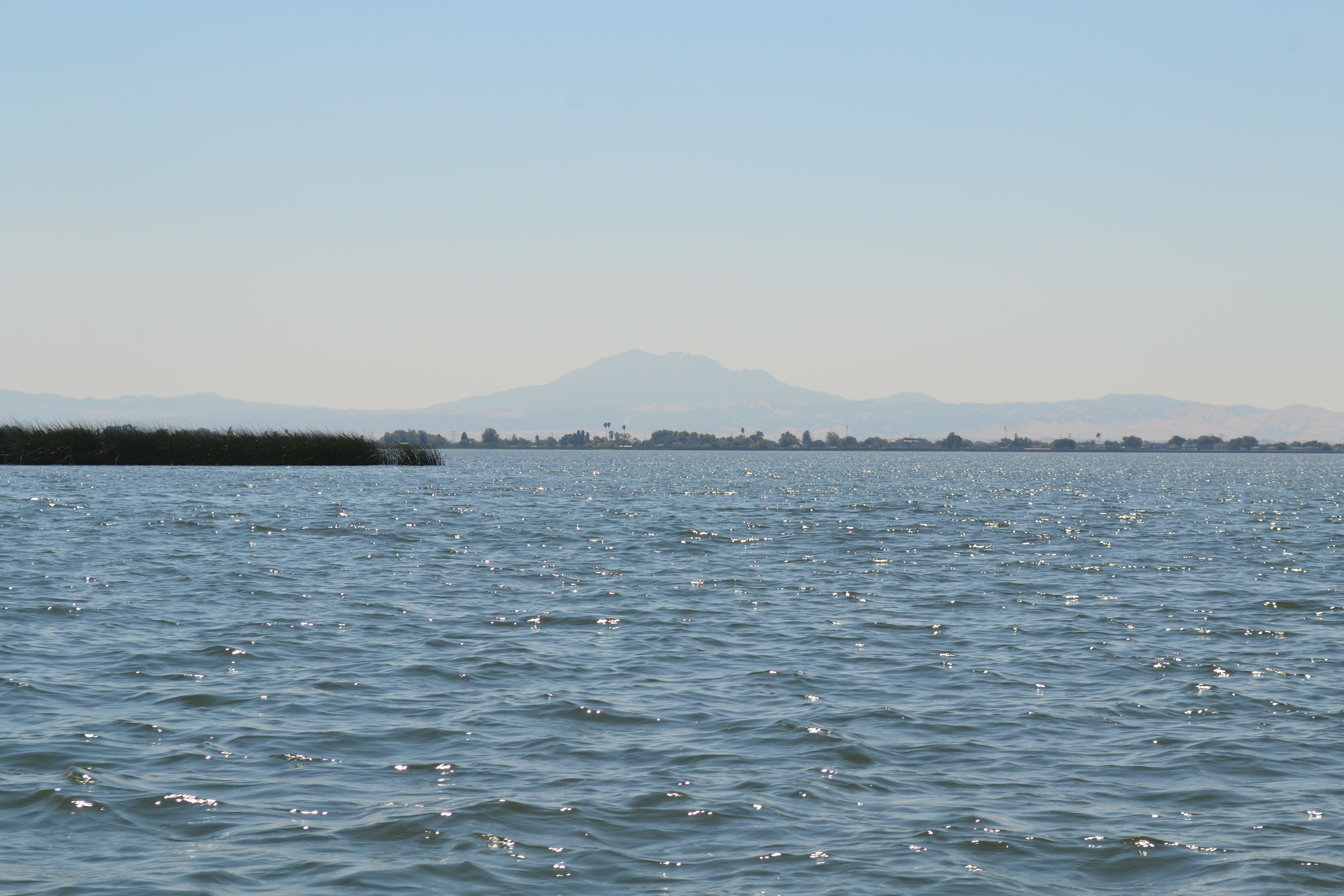
Mount Diablo as seen from Franks Tract in the Sacramento–San Joaquin River Delta

Park expansion continues on all sides of the mountain although its western boundaries are largely complete. Extensive development continues in the southwestern foothills and Tassajara region, such as the upscale development of Blackhawk and individual estates overlooking the Livermore Valley on Morgan Territory Road. Other large projects are proposed in the northern Black Diamond Mines and Los Medanos foothills, at the Concord Naval Weapons Station, and near Marsh Creek State Park. Large-scale development of other private parcels is restricted by city and county urban limit lines, by lack of water, excessive slope, and sensitive resources including rare species. Development of smaller ranchette subdivisions continue to fragment and threaten many parcels and large areas of habitat.

In 2007, Save Mount Diablo published Mount Diablo, Los Vaqueros & Surrounding Parks, Featuring the Diablo Trail, documenting Mount Diablo's more than 90,000 acres (36,000 ha) of protected lands. It includes 100 access points, 520 miles (840 km) of trail, and 400 miles (640 km) of private fire roads.

== Natural history ==
=== Geology ===
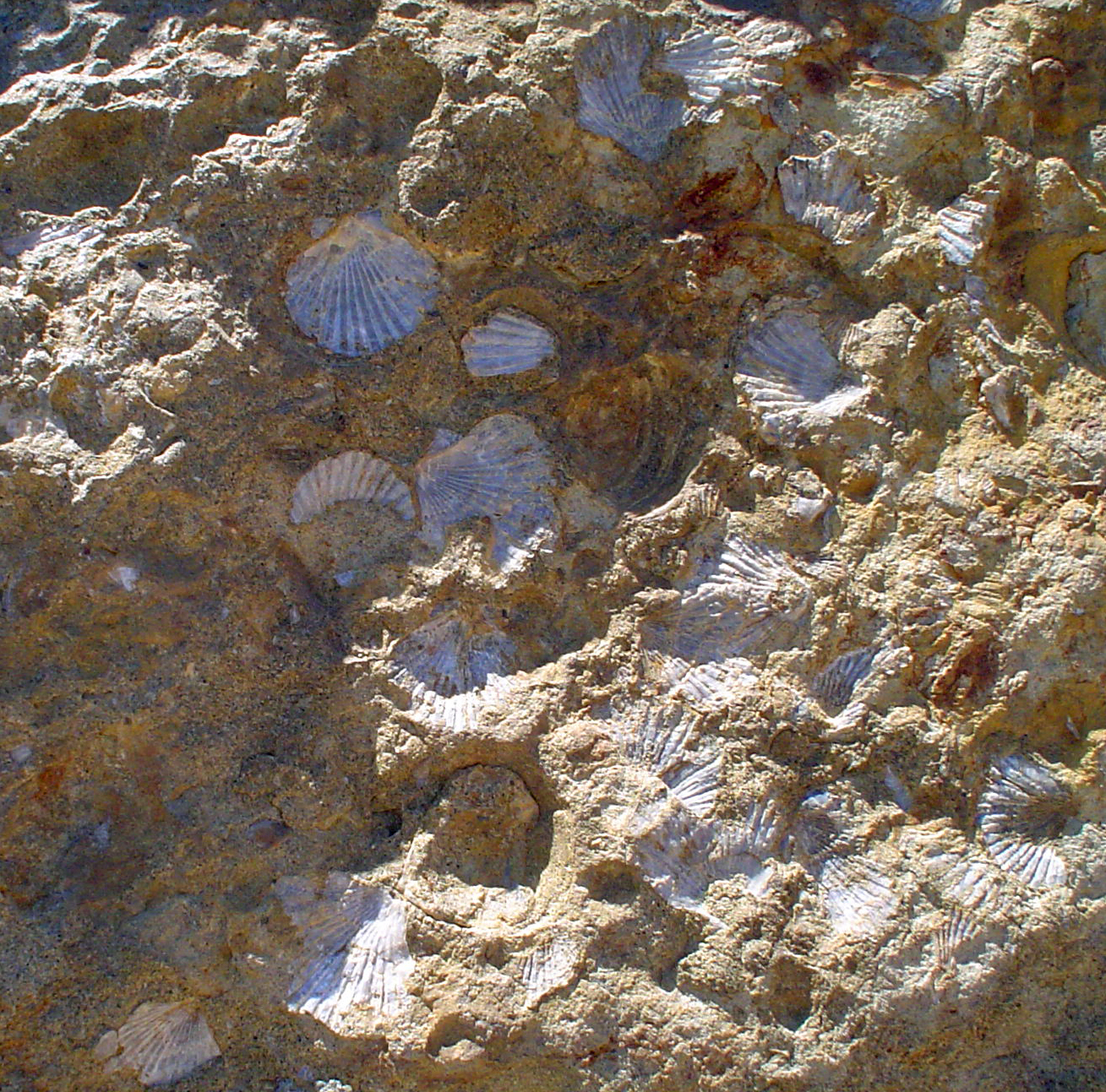
Fossilized sea shells in the sandstone at the summit of Mt. Diablo (about 3,800' MSL)

There are three major groups of rocks composing Mount Diablo -- the Mount Diablo Ophiolite group, dating to the Jurassic; the Franciscan Complex, dating to the Jurassic and Cretaceous; and the combination of the Great Valley Group (Jurassic and Cretaceous) and Younger Sedimentary rocks (Cenozoic).

Ophiolite is a kind of rock that forms in mid-ocean ridges. The Coast Range Ophiolite is ancient oceanic crust caught between an ancient subduction zone off California near the end of the Jurassic, and a former shoreline in the ancient Sierra foothills. This is the source of the ophiolite of Mount Diablo, called the Mount Diablo Ophiolite, which underlies it north of a line drawn from Long Ridge through Murchio Gap. Basalt, diabase, and serpentinite can be found.

The Franciscan Complex underlies the central area of Mount Diablo's summit and the North Peak. It is an "accretionary complex", formed in an east-dipping subduction zone off California as part of the upper oceanic crust (pillow basalt) and what it carried (chert, graywacke, shale, small islands, sea mounts) were scraped off during the process of subduction. These elements were then mixed and partially subducted before ending up on and under the adjacent continental crust. Accretionary faulting forced the complex under the Coast Range Ophiolite (including the Mount Diablo Ophiolite), and their contact is a fault plane, known as the Coast Range Fault. The Franciscan Complex likely underwent metamorphism there, around 12 miles deep. Today, on land, the Franciscan Complex is made up of numerous large and small blocks of various types of rock in a sheared matrix. Between the late Cretaceous and early Eocene, extensional faulting, and ductile thinning of serpentinite in the ophiolite, reduced the weight on the complex, causing it to rise to a depth of ~2 miles.

The Great Valley Group is composed of sedimentary rocks deposited underwater between the Upper Jurassic and the Cretaceous between the ancient Sierra Nevada and the western subduction zone, over the ophiolite basement of the Central Valley. The Mount Diablo area, a persistent "high" though not yet a mountain, was intermittently submerged well into the Pliocene. This region surrounding Mount Diablo was uplifted during the Tertiary Period.

The Younger Sedimentary rocks are described in the following source but are not summarized here.

Although the rocks are quite old, Mount Diablo itself is relatively young. The formation of the mountain began about 2 million years ago during the Pliocene. Between the Pliocene and the present, the Franciscan Complex and overlying Great Valley rocks were folded upward by compression caused by a blind thrust fault under the mountain. The fold is asymmetrical, and is moving southwest due to the blind thrust fault. After the fold was created, erosion removed overlying Great Valley rocks and exposed the Franciscan Complex in the center of the fold, resulting in the modern Mount Diablo. The mountain is still growing today, as it is squeezed between the active Greenville Fault and Concord Fault, through large periodic earthquakes along the Mount Diablo Thrust Fault. Historically this fault has not been seen to move, but a 1% chance is predicted that it will produce a large earthquake within 30 years.

Mount Diablo's "wind caves" were created by water seeping through fractures in and dissolving the Domegine Sandstone.

Deposits of glassmaking-grade sand and lower-quality coal north of the mountain were mined in the 19th and early 20th centuries, but are now open to visitors as the Black Diamond Mines Regional Preserve. Guided tours of the sand mines and coal field are provided.

=== Vegetation ===
The park's vegetation is mixed oak woodland and savannah and open grassland with extensive areas of chaparral and a number of endemic plant species, such as the Mount Diablo manzanita (Arctostaphylos auriculata), Mount Diablo fairy-lantern (Calochortus pulchellus), chaparral bellflower (Campanula exigua), Mount Diablo bird's beak (Cordylanthus nidularius), Mount Diablo phacelia (Phacelia phacelioides) and Mount Diablo sunflower (Helianthella castanea). The park includes substantial thickets, isolated examples, and mixed ground cover of western poison oak. (It is best to learn the characteristics of this shrub and its toxin before hiking on narrow trails through brush and to be aware that it can be bare of leaves (but toxic to contact) in the winter.)

At higher altitudes and on north slopes is the widely distributed foothill pine (Pinus sabiniana). Knobcone pine (Pinus attenuata) may be found along Knobcone Pine Road in the southern part of the park. The park and nearby Black Diamond Mines Regional Preserve mark the northern extreme of the range of Coulter pine (Pinus coulteri). This species may be seen along the Coulter Pine Trail near the north (Mitchell Canyon) entrance.

In 2005 the endangered species Mount Diablo buckwheat (Eriogonum truncatum), thought to be extinct because it had been last seen in 1936 and its habitat had been overrun by introduced grasses, was rediscovered in a remote area of the mountain.

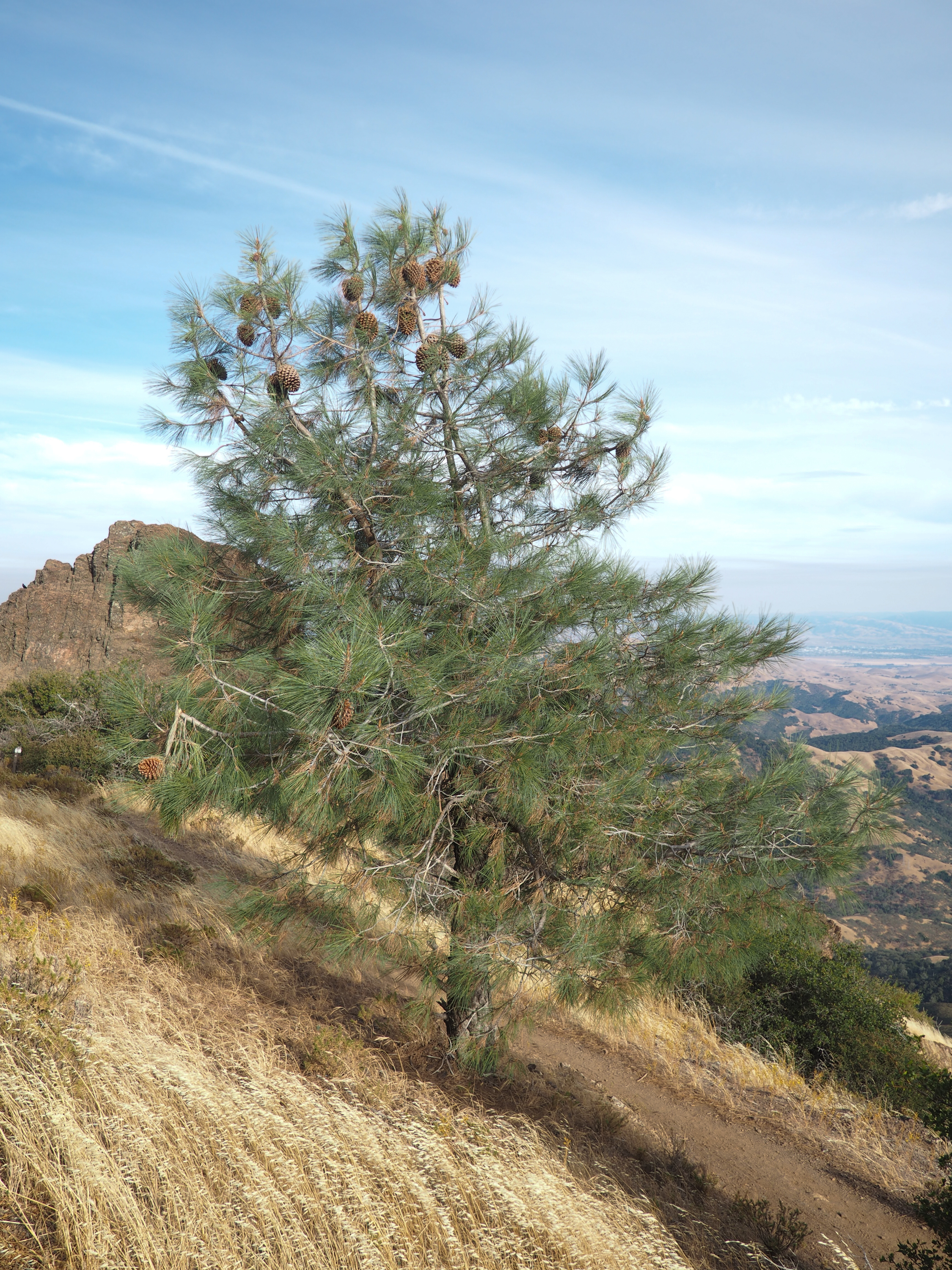
This Pinus sabiniana (foothill pine), the most common tree species in the park, is dwarfed by harsh conditions near the summit of Mount Diablo.

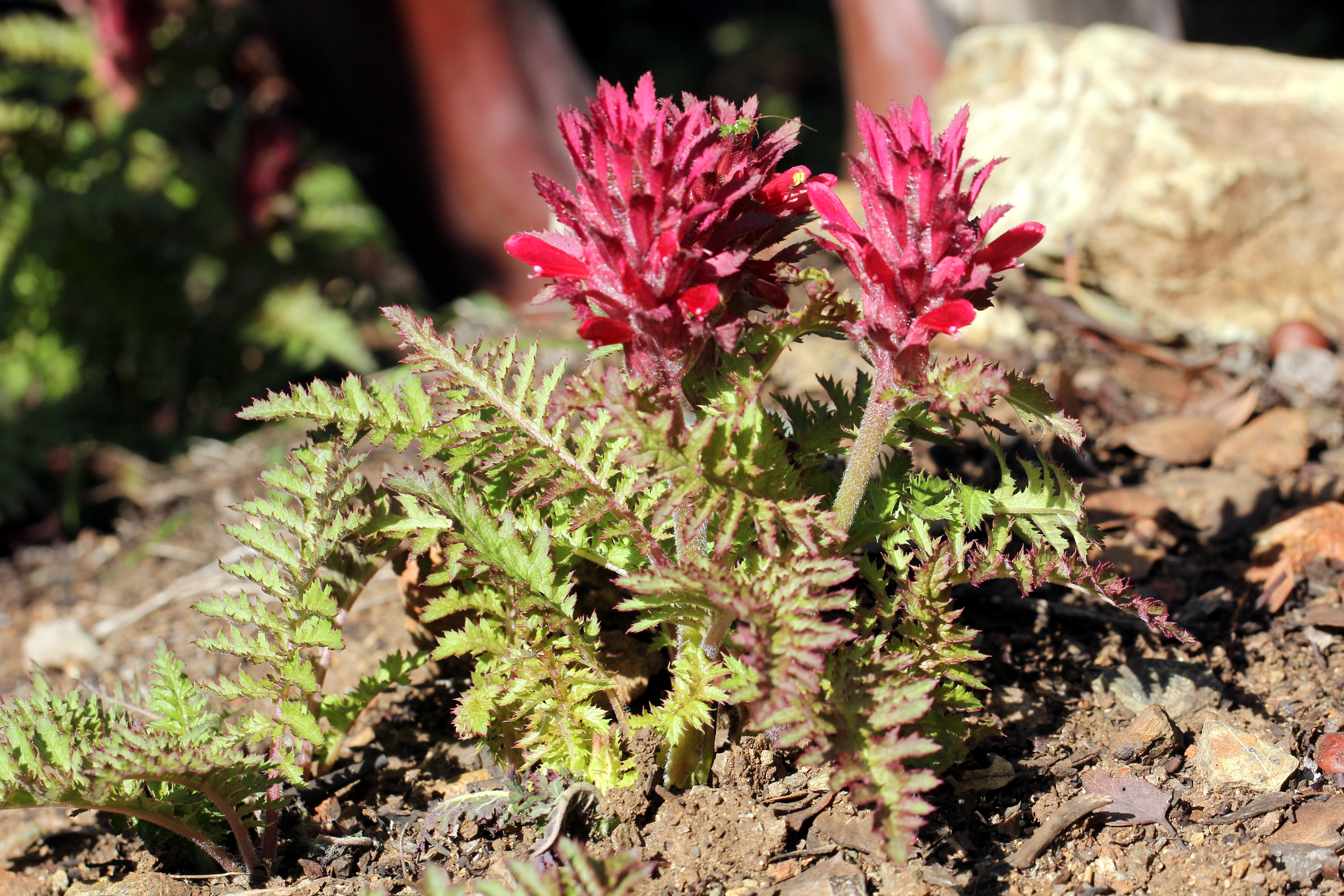
Pedicularis densiflora

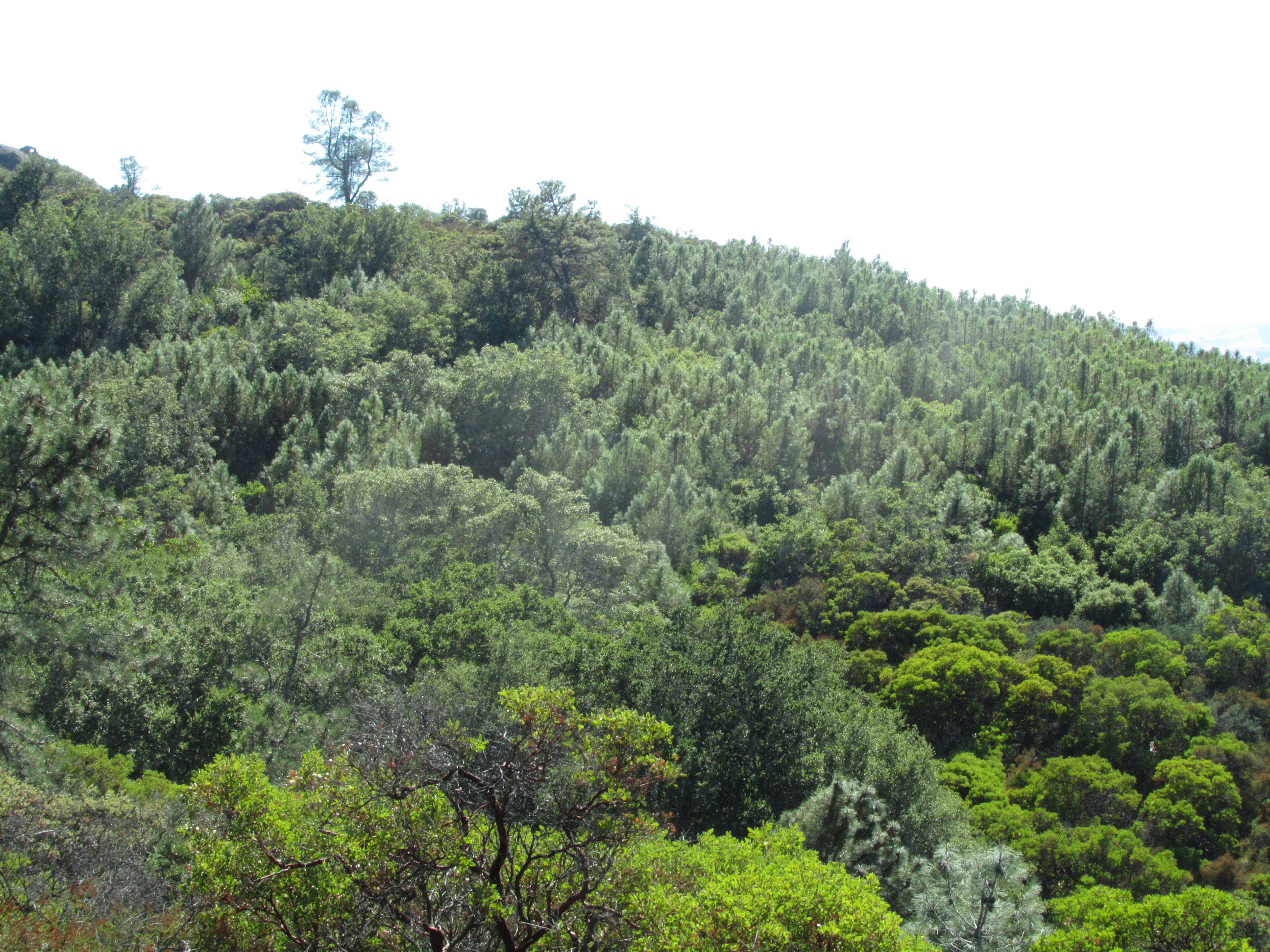
Arctostaphylos auriculata

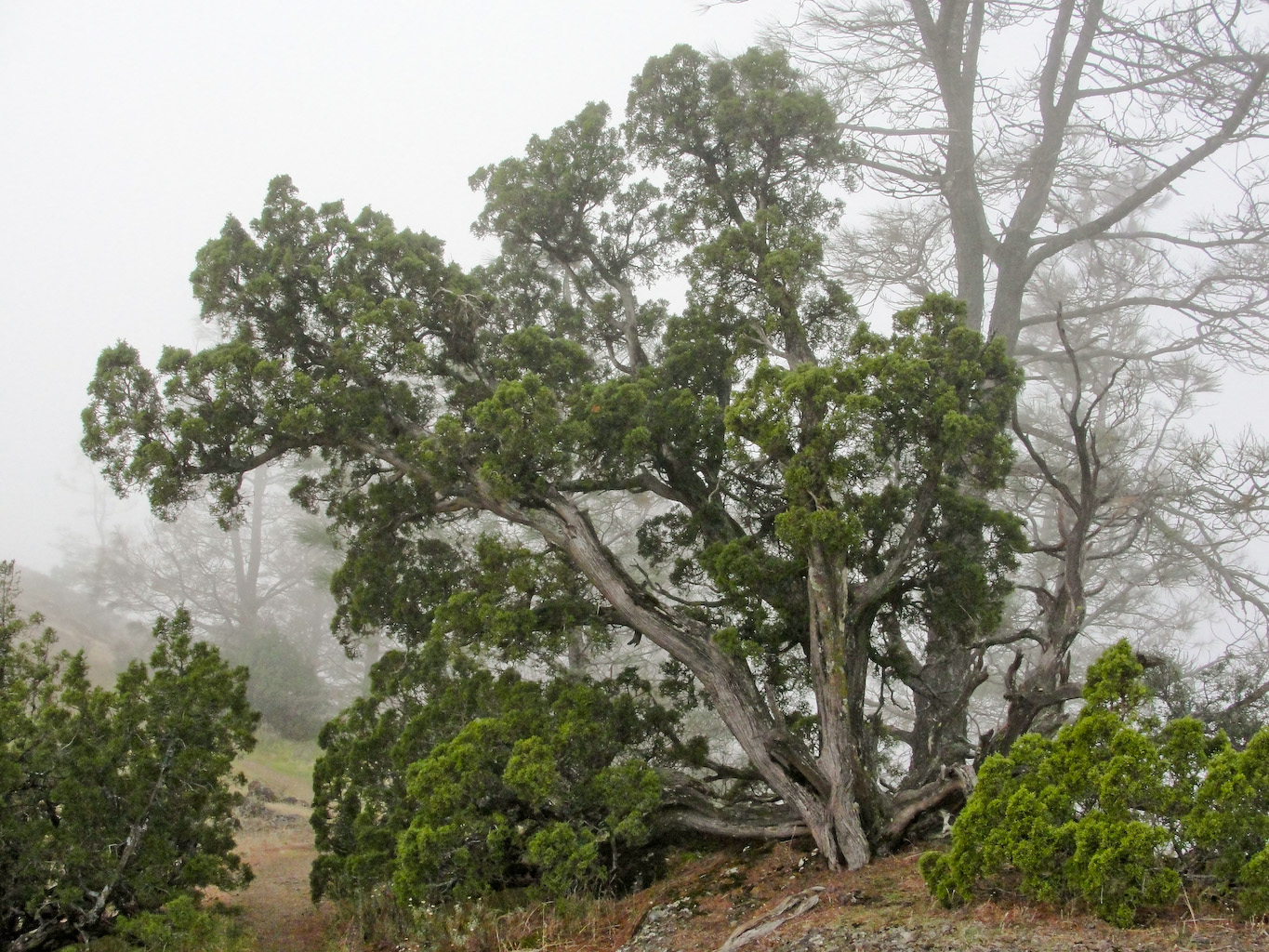
Juniperus californica

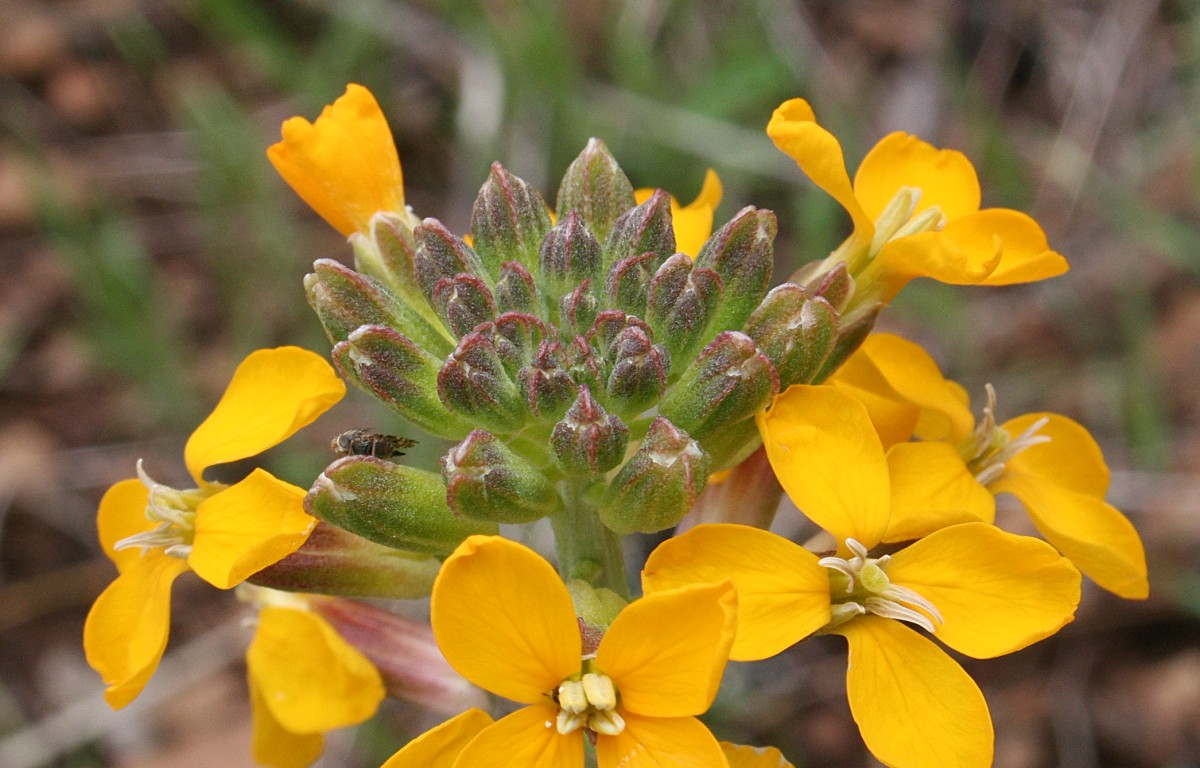
Erysimum capitatum

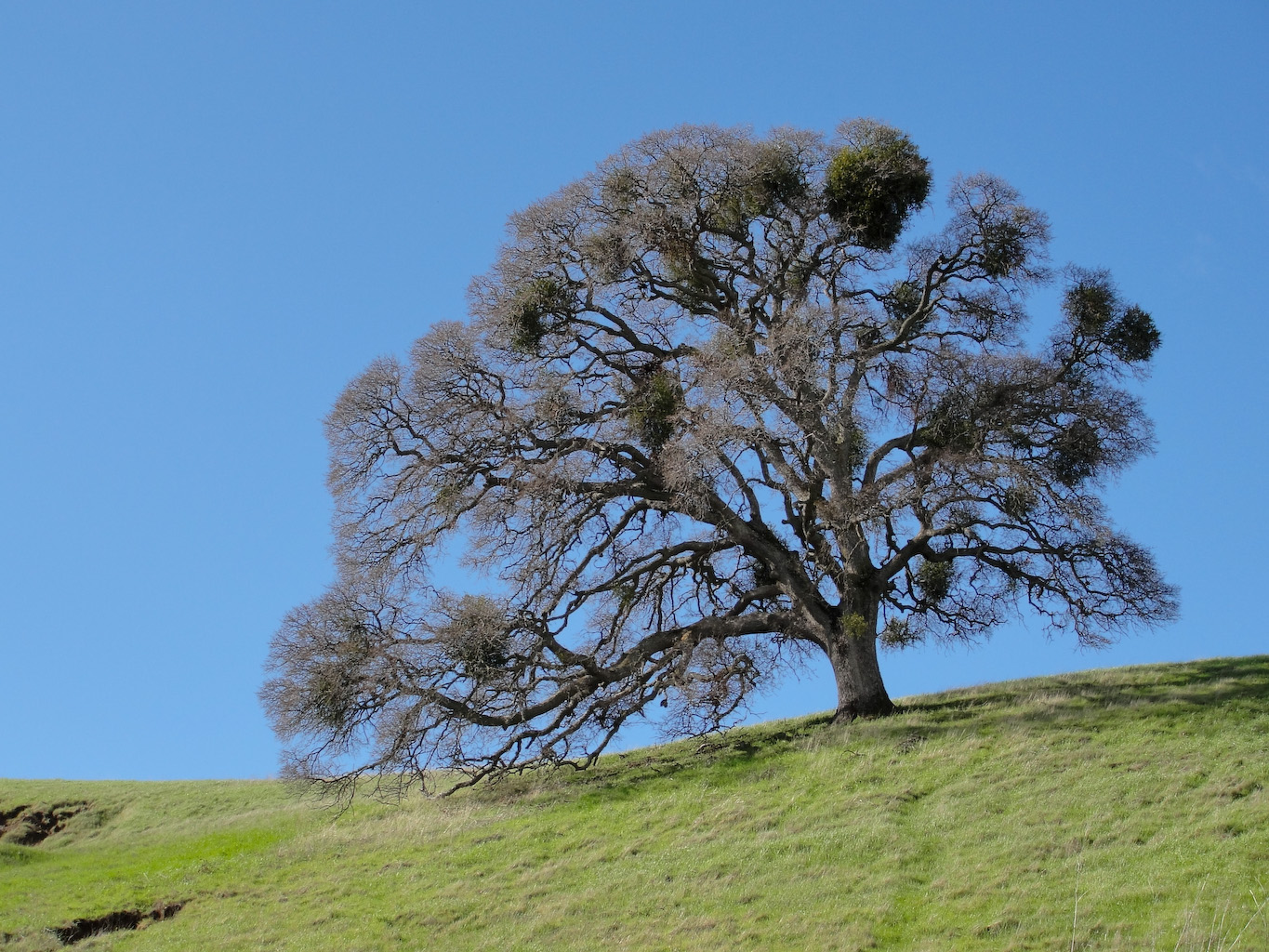
Quercus lobata

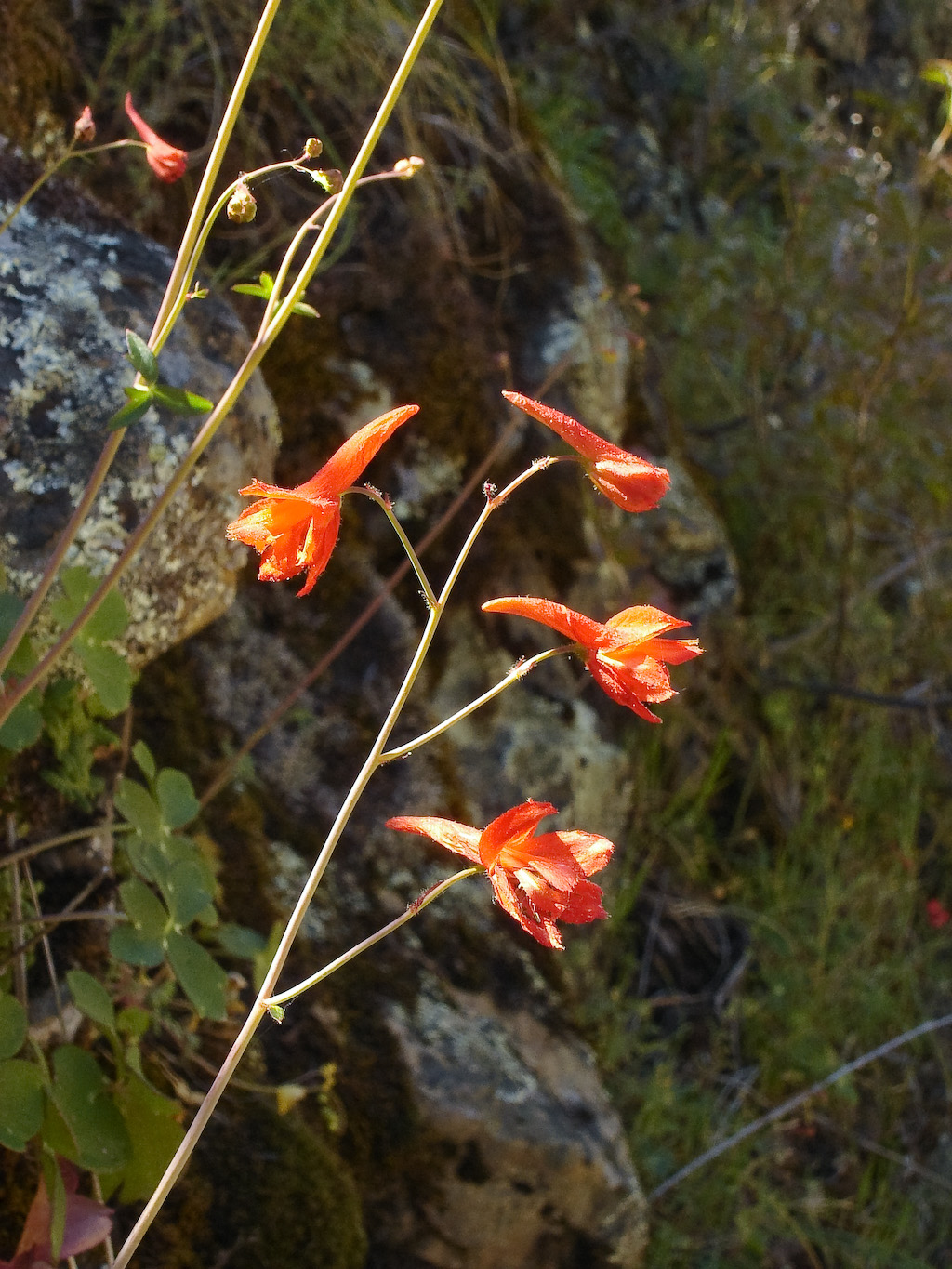
Delphinium nudicaule

=== Wildlife ===
All vegetation, minerals and wildlife within the park are protected and it is illegal to remove such items or to harass any wildlife.

Commonly seen animals include coyote, bobcat, black-tailed deer, California ground squirrels, fox squirrels and grey foxes; and many other mammals are present. It is a chief remaining refuge for the threatened Alameda whipsnake, California red-legged frog. Less common wildlife species include the reintroduced peregrine falcon, ringtail cats, and to the east American badgers, San Joaquin kit fox, roadrunners, California tiger salamander, and burrowing owls. There are also exotic (non-native) animals such as the red fox and opossum, the latter being North America's only marsupial.

In September and October male tarantula spiders can be seen (Aphonopelma iodius) as they seek a mate. These spiders are harmless unless severely provoked, and their bite is only as bad as a bee sting. More dangerous are black widow spiders, far less likely to be encountered in the open.

In the wintertime, between November and February, bald eagles and golden eagles are present. These birds are less easily seen than many raptors; golden eagles, particularly, fly at high elevations. Mount Diablo is part of the Altamont Area/Diablo Range, which enjoys the largest concentration of golden eagles anywhere. In recent years there have been credible sightings of California condors, which have been reintroduced at Pinnacles National Park, located to the south in the Gilroy-Hollister area.

A potential hazard is Northern Pacific rattlesnake. While generally shy and non-threatening, they are often found warming themselves in the open (as on trails and ledges) on cool, sunny days. Other wildlife to avoid include fleas, ticks and mosquitoes.

Although transient mountain lion or puma (Puma concolor) have been seen, Mount Diablo does not have breeding puma despite abundant suitable habitat and appears to be a biogeographic island because of highway barriers surrounding it (Interstate 680, Interstate 580, Interstate 5). In case of encountering transient puma, please see the mountain lion safety tips in the mountain lion article.

Although tule elk, an elk subspecies found only in California, were historically native to the Mount Diablo Region, they were hunted to extinction by 1850. Northwards expansion of Diablo Range elk to Mount Diablo has been blocked by Interstate 580. In 2006 a bull elk swam 4 miles (6.4 km) across Suisun Bay from the Grizzly Island herd to Contra Costa County, and historically large herds crossed the Carquinez Strait.

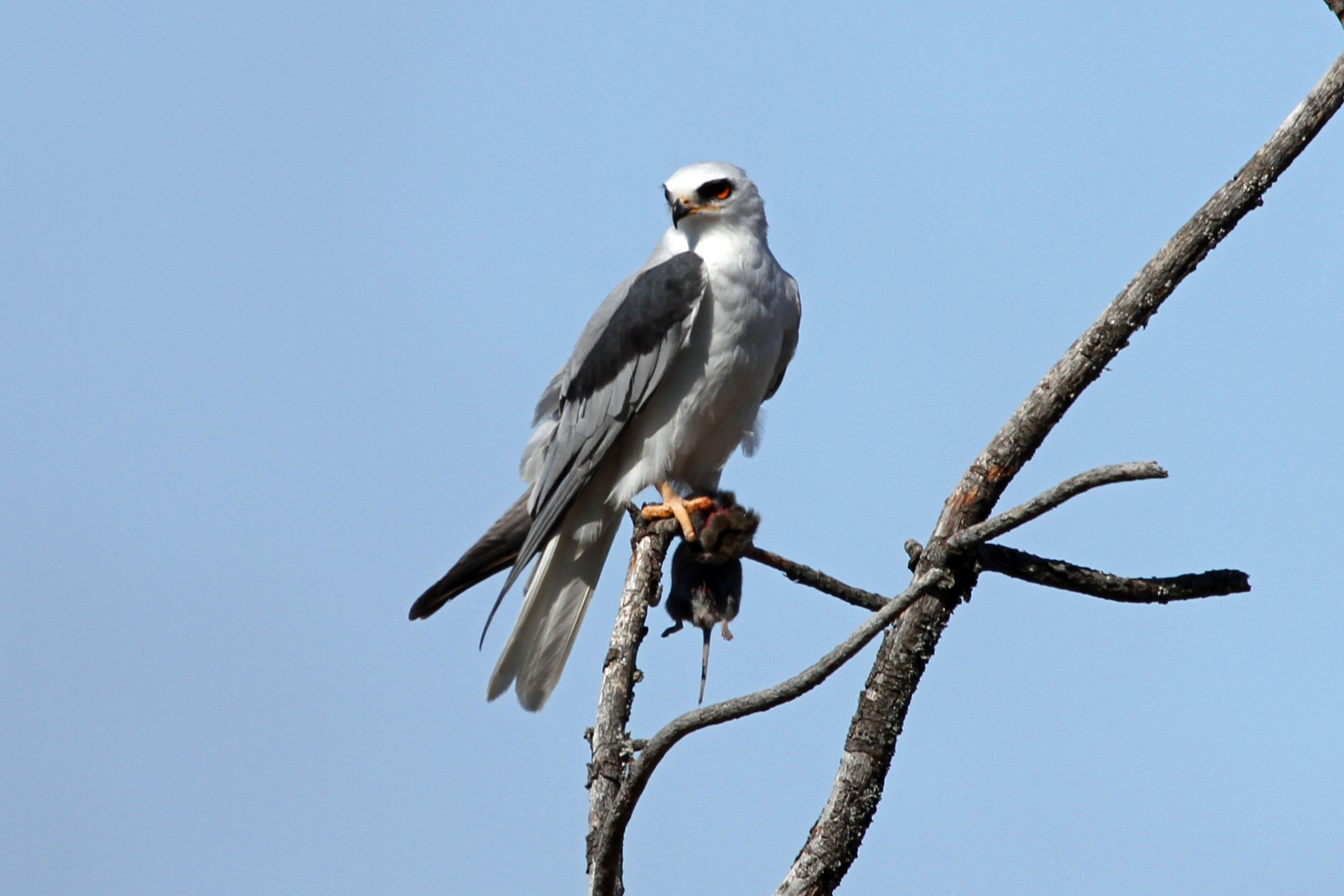
White-tailed kite

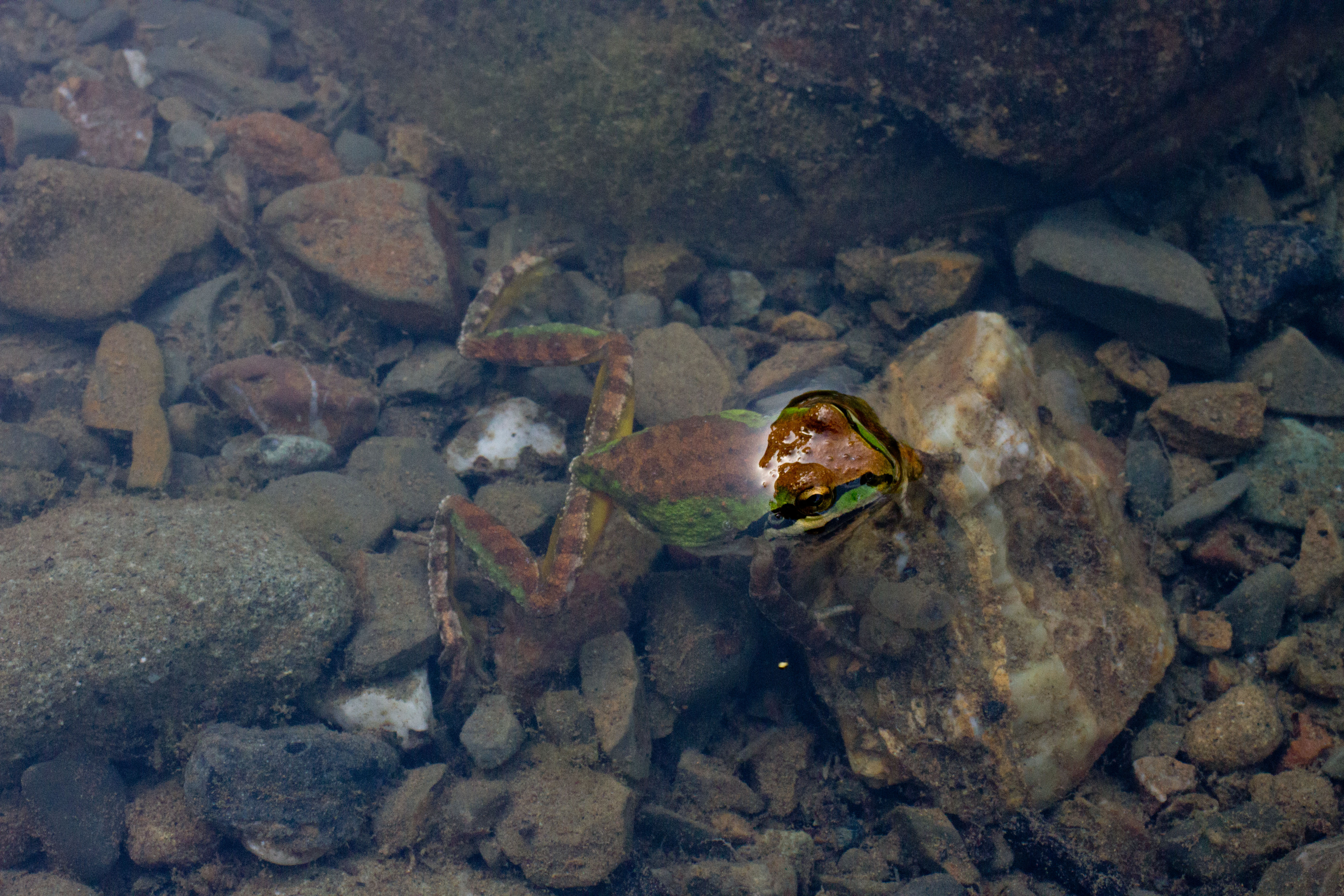
Pacific tree frog

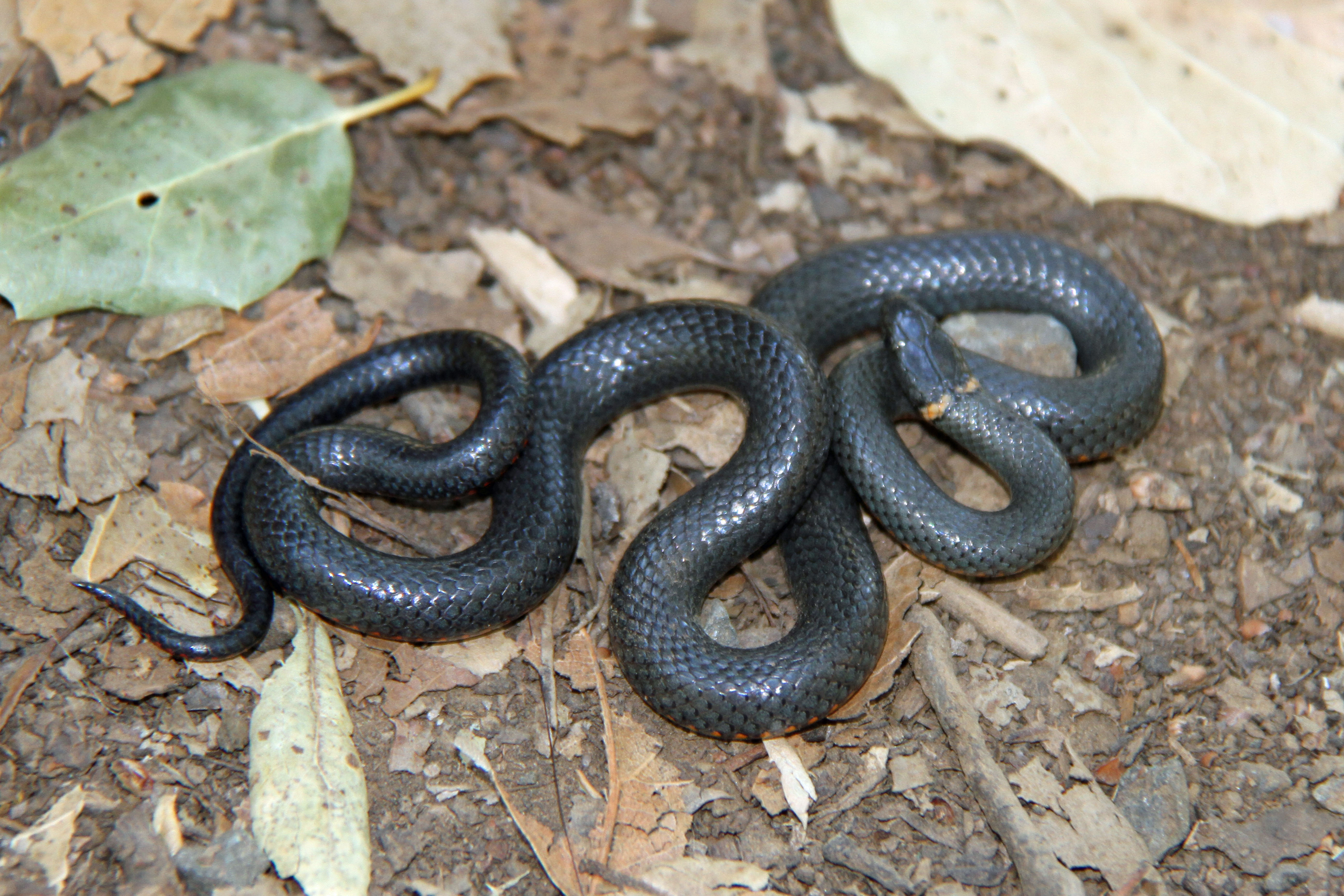
Ring-necked snake

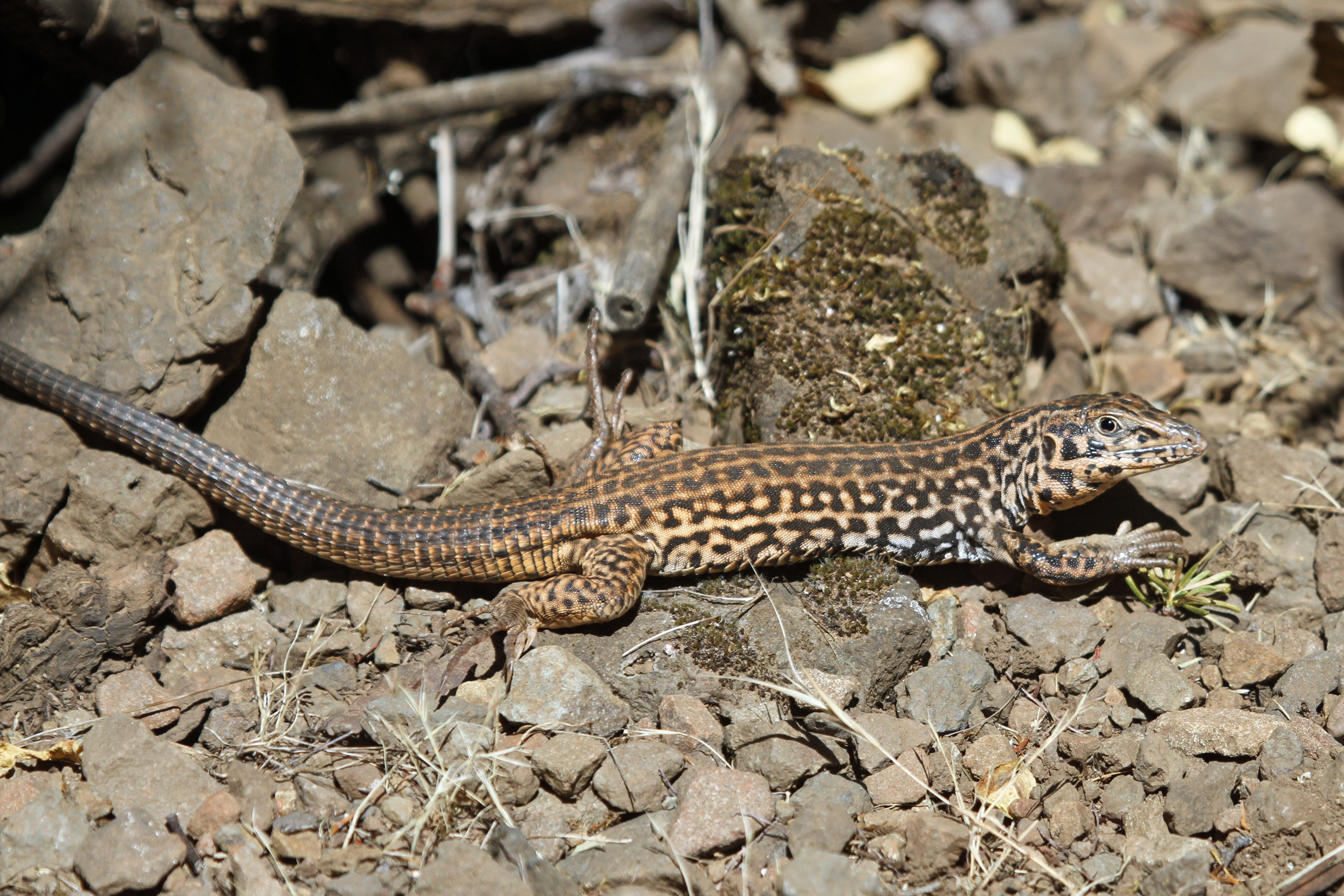
Western whiptail lizard

== Facilities ==
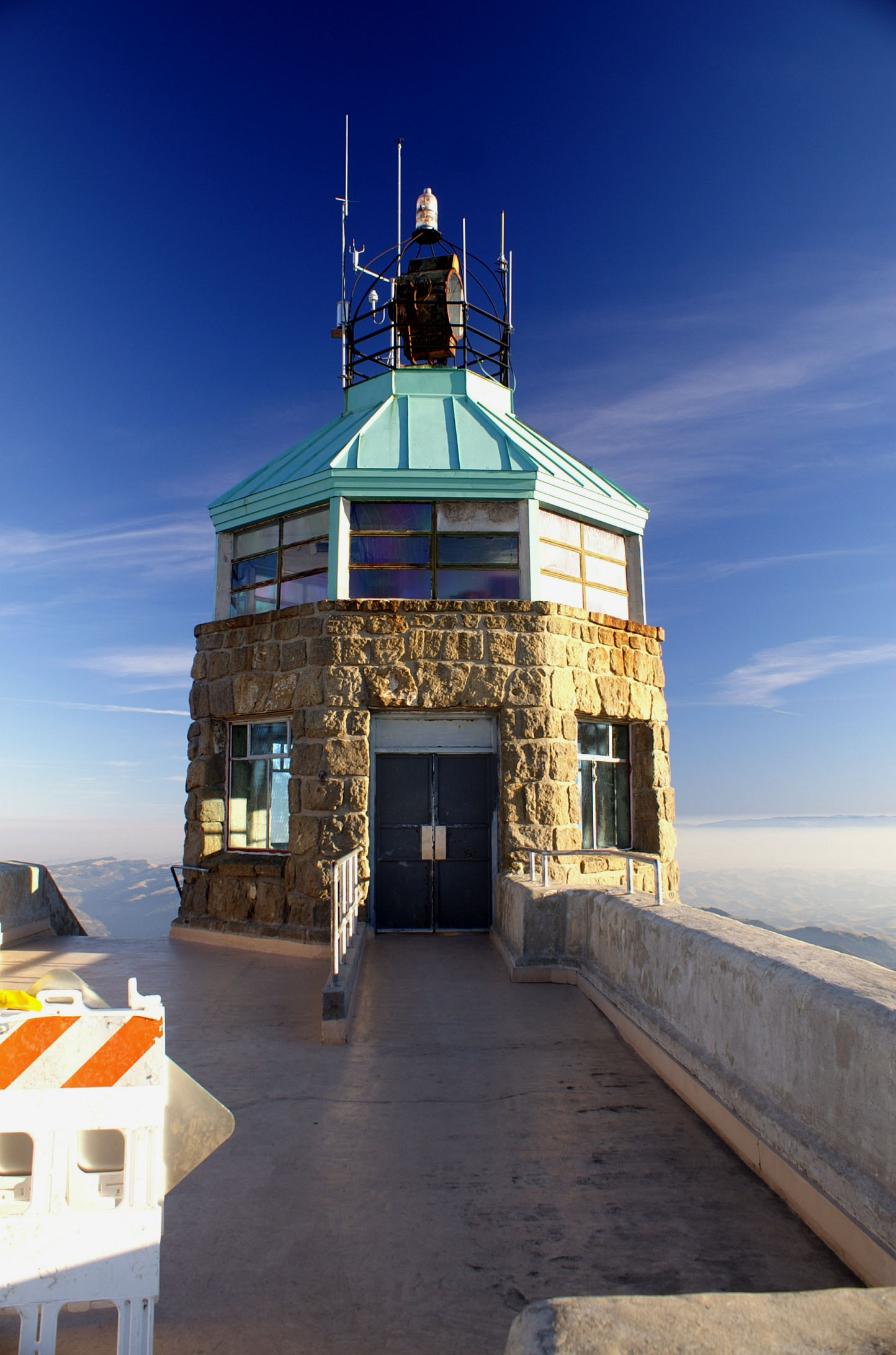
Summit-building roof promenade and beacon tower, Mount Diablo, constructed by Civilian Conservation Corps, 1939–42

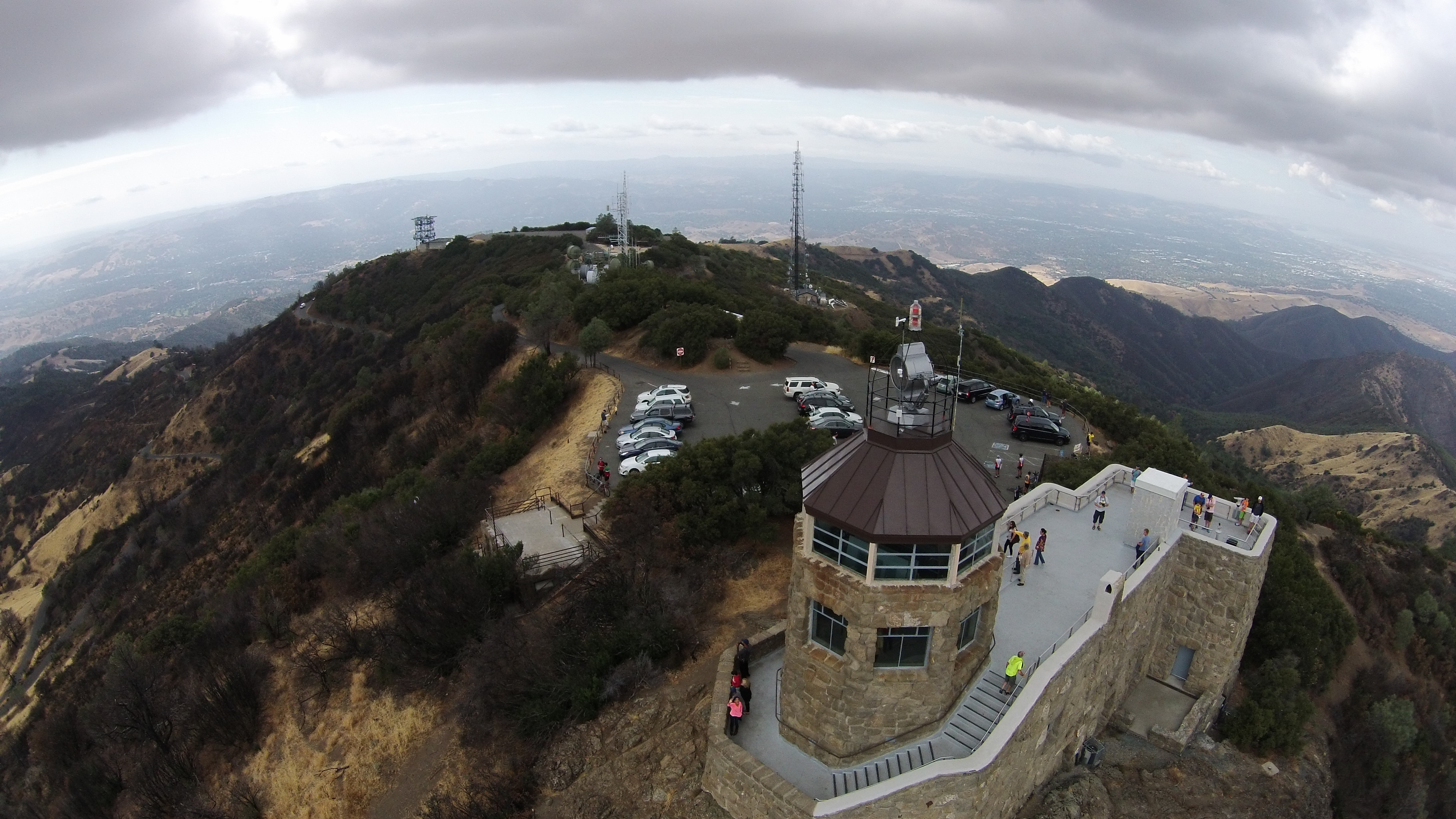
Summit Visitor Center in 2014

Entrance stations are located at the end of Northgate Road (in Walnut Creek) and Diablo Road (in Danville). The Danville entrance is also known as Southgate. If the entrance stations are not operating, park fees may be paid at the junction ranger station, where the two roads join.

From here the road reaches the summit of the mountain, where there is a visitors center housing an observation deck and natural history exhibits. The Summit Visitor center was constructed in the 1930s and is made up fossiliferous sandstoneblocks which were quarried in the park.

From the elevation of the lower lot the Mary Bowerman Trail is a level wheelchair-accessible path and boardwalk with interpretive stations that extends part way around the mountain; a regular single track trail completes the loop. There are 520 miles (840 km) of hiking and equestrian trails, some available for mountain biking.

Camping facilities are available within the park. There are numerous picnic sites. Pets are restricted and require proper documentation for rabies (not just a tag). Daytime visitors must exit the park by sunset except for special events. Some picnic spots may be reserved but most are available without reservation.

Alcohol is forbidden in the park. Fires are allowed only during the wet season (generally December through April), and only in sanctioned fire pits. The park may be closed on windy days during the dry season due to extremely hazardous fire conditions.

Two additional entrances with parking for hikers are provided on the northwest side of the park at Mitchell Canyon and Donner Canyon. Mitchell Canyon provides easy access to Black Point and Eagle Peak. Donner Canyon provides hikers access to Eagle Peak, Mount Olympia, North Peak, and the popular Falls Trail, which features several seasonal waterfalls.

== Climate ==
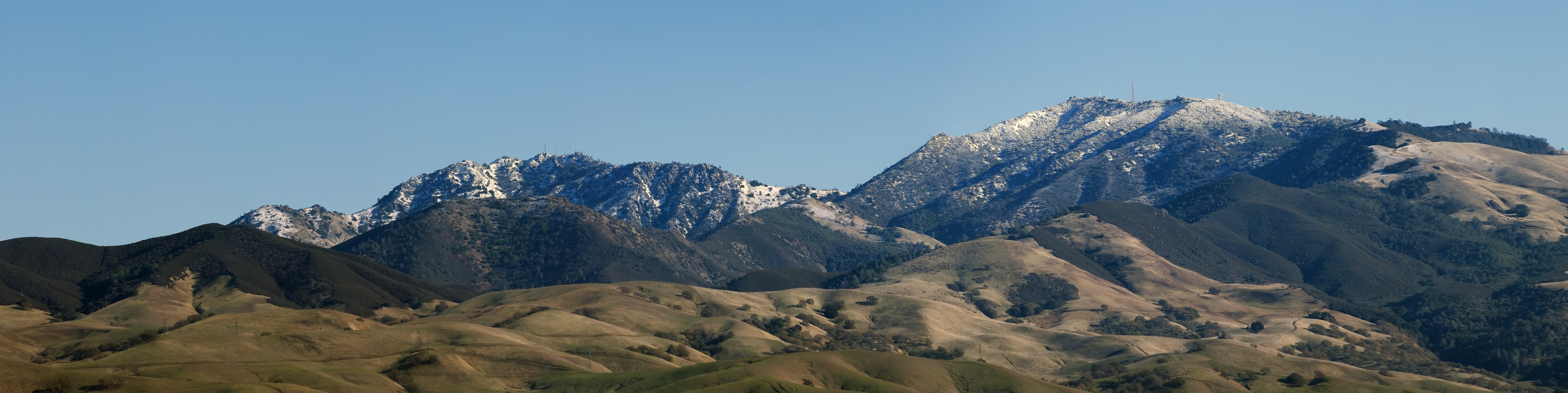
Snow on the peaks of Mount Diablo, as seen from Walnut Creek in December 2008

The National Weather Service maintains a weather station at Mount Diablo Junction, 2,170 feet (661 m) above sea level. The warmest month at the station is July with an average high of 85.2 °F (29.5 °C) and an average low of 59.6 °F (15.3 °C). The coolest month is January with an average high of 55.6 °F (13.1 °C) and an average low of 39.3° (4.1 °C). The highest temperature recorded there was 111 °F (43.9 °C) on July 15, 1972. The lowest temperature on record was 14 °F (-10 °C) on February 6, 1989, and on December 14, 1990. (The San Francisco Chronicle reported that the temperature dropped to 10 °F (-12.2 °C) at the summit on January 21, 1962.) Temperatures reach 90 °F (32.2 °C) or higher on an average of 36.0 days each year and 100 °F (37.8 °C) or higher on 3.3 days each year. Lows of 32 °F (0 °C) or lower occur on an average of 15.4 days annually. Annual precipitation averages 23.96 inches (609 mm). The most precipitation recorded in a month was 13.54 inches (344 mm) in February 1998. The greatest 24-hour precipitation was 5.02 inches (128 mm) on January 21, 1972. The average annual days with measurable precipitation is 65.3 days.

Snowfall at Mount Diablo Junction averages 1.2 inches (30 mm) each year. Prior to 2009, the most snowfall observed in a month was 17.0 inches (430 mm) in April 1975; that same month saw 6.0 inches (150 mm) in one day (April 4, 1975). The greatest snow depth was 3.0 inches (76 mm) on January 27, 1972. Measurable snowfall does not occur every year, so the annual average days with measurable snowfall is only .5 days. Snow is more common in the upper reaches of the mountain. On December 7, 2009, Mount Diablo received a rare snowfall of 18.0 inches (460 mm), more in one day than what is normally received in a decade.

=== Data-collecting note ===
The Mt. Diablo Junction weather station is positioned at only about 55 percent of the mountain's height. Temperatures and snow levels are notably different than at the upper reaches of the mountain, where lower temperatures and greater snowfall may have occurred, but simply have not been recorded. Nearby Bay Area mountains, like Mount Hamilton, have their weather stations at or near the summit. This is why recorded snow levels on Mount Hamilton are much higher than the ones recorded at Mount Diablo Junction, even though the difference in height of Mount Hamilton and Mount Diablo is only about 400 feet (120 m).

Three conditions are measured at the actual summit, however: wind speed, wind direction and temperature; and are available by an automatic telephone voice response system. Recorded information concerning gate open times, road and pet restrictions, and events is available at another number. These numbers are posted at the park website.

Climate data for Mt. Diablo (near summit), elevation: 3,337 ft (1,017 m)
Month	Jan	Feb	Mar	Apr	May	Jun	Jul	Aug	Sep	Oct	Nov	Dec	Year
Mean daily maximum °F (°C)	51.2 (10.7)	50.6 (10.3)	54.9 (12.7)	57.6 (14.2)	66.0 (18.9)	74.2 (23.4)	80.9 (27.2)	80.8 (27.1)	78.1 (25.6)	67.2 (19.6)	56.3 (13.5)	50.7 (10.4)	64.0 (17.8)
Mean daily minimum °F (°C)	37.1 (2.8)	37.2 (2.9)	38.4 (3.6)	40.0 (4.4)	45.9 (7.7)	52.0 (11.1)	63.5 (17.5)	59.1 (15.1)	56.3 (13.5)	49.3 (9.6)	41.4 (5.2)	36.9 (2.7)	46.4 (8.0)
Average precipitation inches (mm)	5.49 (139)	5.80 (147)	3.88 (99)	1.57 (40)	0.97 (25)	0.22 (5.6)	0.07 (1.8)	0.07 (1.8)	0.30 (7.6)	1.67 (42)	3.72 (94)	4.96 (126)	28.72 (729)

Climate data for Mt. Diablo Junction, elevation: 2,170 ft (661 m)
Month	Jan	Feb	Mar	Apr	May	Jun	Jul	Aug	Sep	Oct	Nov	Dec	Year
Mean daily maximum °F (°C)	55.5 (13.1)	56.6 (13.7)	59.8 (15.4)	64.4 (18.0)	70.5 (21.4)	77.6 (25.3)	84.7 (29.3)	84.7 (29.3)	81.7 (27.6)	73.5 (23.1)	61.8 (16.6)	55.2 (12.9)	68.9 (20.5)
Mean daily minimum °F (°C)	40.0 (4.4)	40.3 (4.6)	41.8 (5.4)	43.7 (6.5)	48.9 (9.4)	54.3 (12.4)	60.3 (15.7)	59.7 (15.4)	57.8 (14.3)	51.6 (10.9)	44.5 (6.9)	39.8 (4.3)	48.6 (9.2)
Average precipitation inches (mm)	4.77 (121)	4.62 (117)	3.52 (89)	1.63 (41)	1.06 (27)	0.19 (4.8)	0.01 (0.25)	0.04 (1.0)	0.28 (7.1)	1.42 (36)	3.11 (79)	4.39 (112)	25.04 (636)
Average snowfall inches (cm)	0.5 (1.3)	0.2 (0.51)	0.3 (0.76)	0.4 (1.0)	0 (0)	0 (0)	0 (0)	0 (0)	0 (0)	0 (0)	0 (0)	0.1 (0.25)	1.5 (3.8)

== Art and literature ==
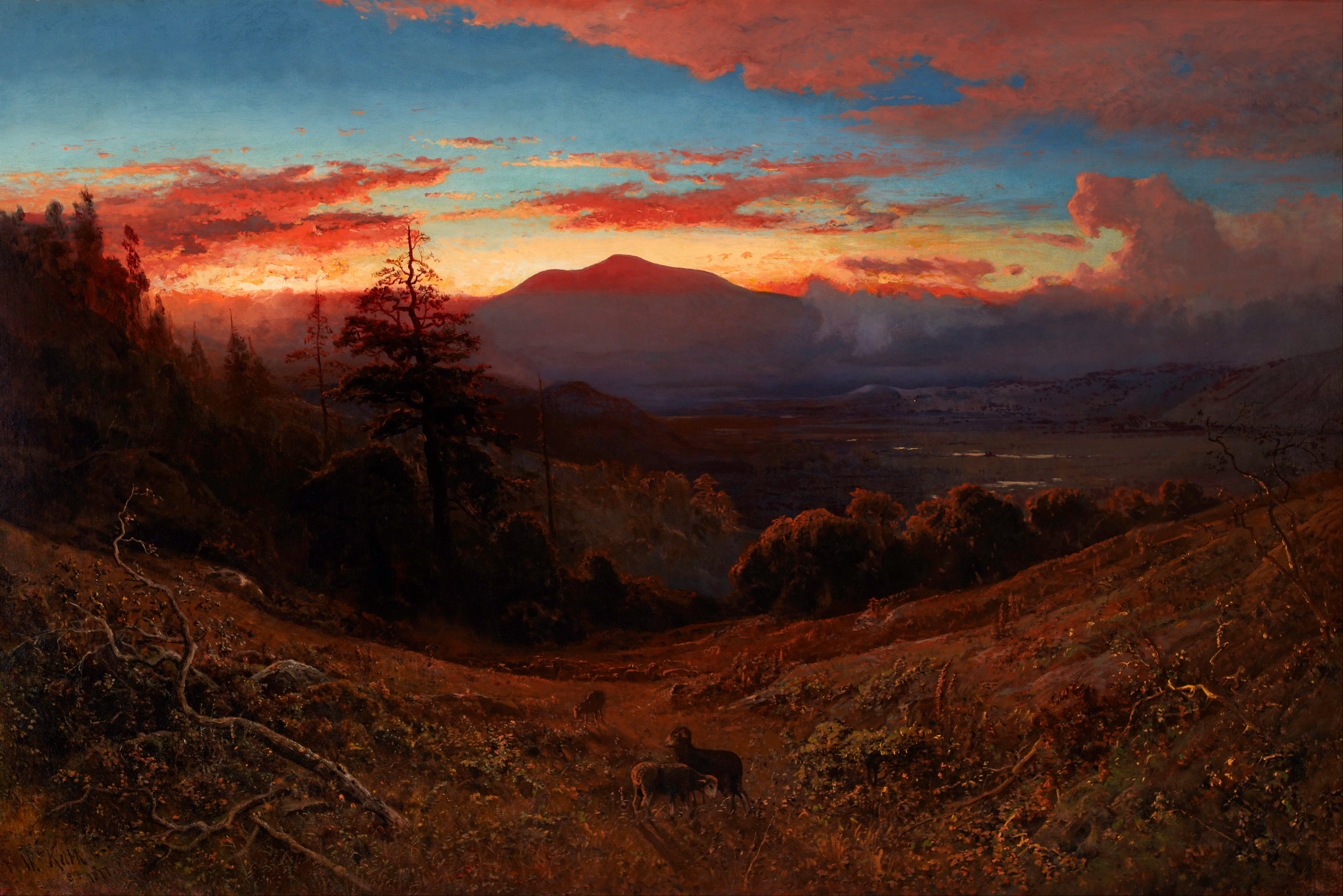
Sunset on Mount Diablo by William Keith, 1877.

Mount Diablo has inspired many artists and writers. Early work centered on exploration, surveying and was related to the rise and popularization of tourism in the Pacific west. Themes were suggested and heightened by early tourism promoters, the beginnings of the area's preservation and the rise of the environmental movement. The focus was accelerated by artists associated with the University of California, Berkeley, the California College of Arts, the actions of the organizations Save Mount Diablo and the Mount Diablo Interpretive Association, and area art centers, galleries, and museums. In modern times Mount Diablo art has been most strongly represented in plein aire painting, especially the group Artists for Action, and photography.

Representative work includes books and articles by classical writers such as William Brewer, Richard Henry Dana Jr., Alexandre Dumas, père, Bret Harte, and the Reverend Thomas Starr King, and modern ones such as Mark Allen Cunningham. Poets whose work features the mountain include Philip Lamantia, Andrew Schelling, and Helen Pinkerton.

Early painters include Thomas Almond Ayres, Eugene Camerer, W. H. Dougal, Eduard Hildebrandt, Charles Hittell, Edward Jump, William Keith, John Ross Key, Charles Koppel, Edward Lehman, Pascal Loomis, Henry Miller, Joseph Warren Revere, through Clarkson Dye and others, to modern painters such as Robert Becker, Frank J. Bette, Ruth Breve, Betty Boggess Lathrap, Paul Carey, Bob Chapla, Mary Lou Correia, Ellen Curtis, Pam Della, Susan Dennis, Warren Dreher, John Finger, Pam Glover, JoAnn Hanna, Peg Humphreys, Don Irwin, Jeanne Kapp, Geri Keary, Chris Kent, Paul Kratter, Eunice Kritscher, Fred Martin, Cathy Moloney, Shirley Nootbaar, Charlotte Panton, Greg Piatt, Kenneth Potter, Robin Purcell, Ocean Quigley, Don Reich, Mary Silverwood, Barbara Stanton, Bruce Stangeland, Marty Stanley, and even the recognized comic book painter Dan Brereton.

Photographers include Ansel Adams, Cleet Carlton, Alfred A. Hart, Scott Hein, Stephen Joseph, Don Paulson, Brad Perks, Robert Picker, Richard Rollins, David Sanger, Michael Sewell and Bob Walker.

The mountain has inspired musical artists ranging from the Kronos Quartet to commissioned works by the California Symphony. Local pop-punk band The Story So Far have a song titled "Mt. Diablo".

The mountain's name is the source for the "Devils" part of the name of the Blue Devils Drum and Bugle Corps, a 17 time Drum Corps International world champion corps, founded and based in Concord, California since 1957.

David Brevik, head of Blizzard North, got the idea for the name of the Diablo game franchise from Mt. Diablo while living nearby.

== Events ==
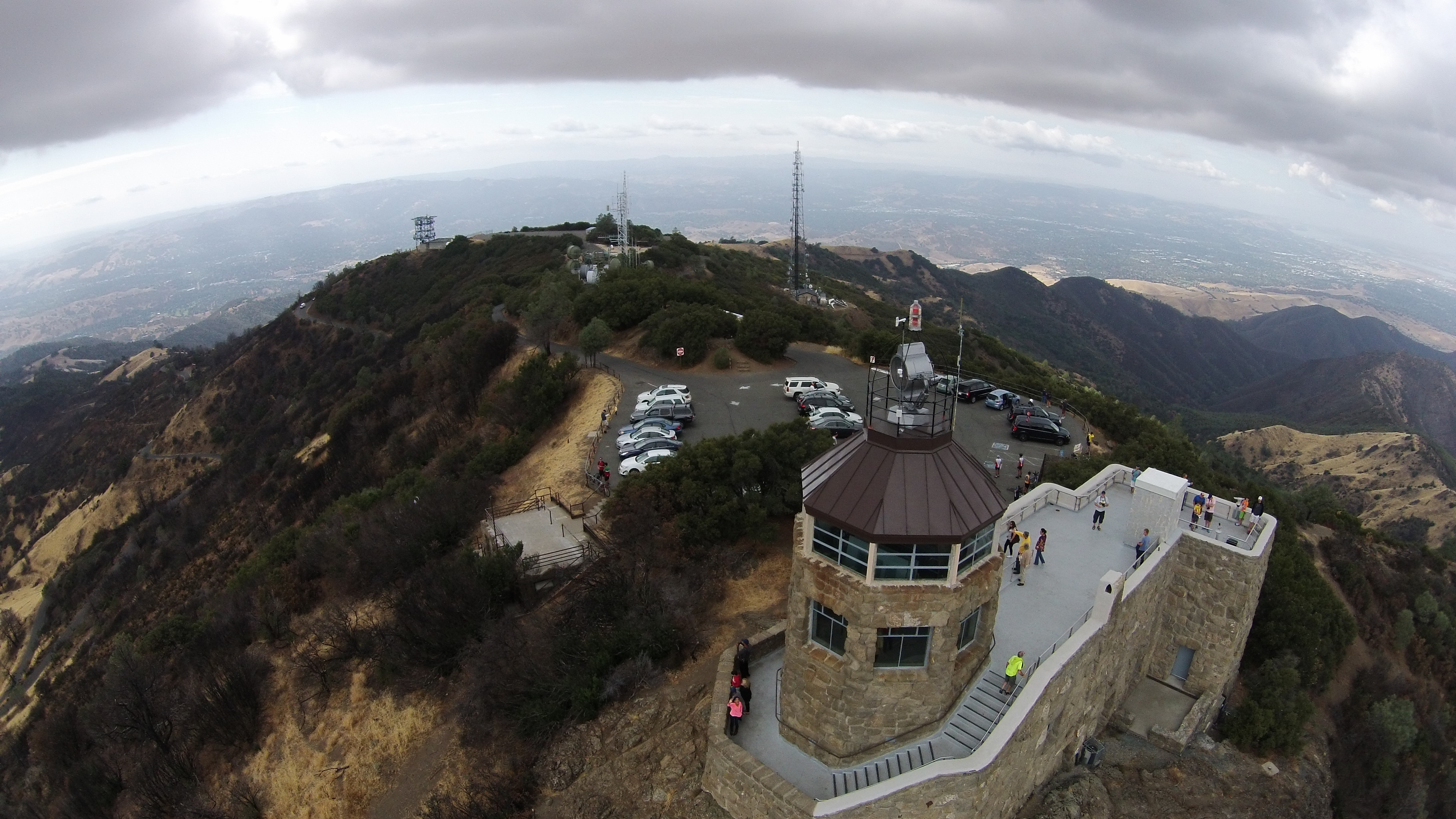
Aerial view of the summit visitor center showing the renewed aircraft beacon

Each Fall the male tarantulas of Mt. Diablo emerge from their burrows to seek mates. The Mt. Diablo Interpretive Association offers guided hikes to observe the migration. The "March of the Tarantulas" can begin as early as August and last through October.

Every year since 1964, the Pearl Harbor survivors and their families have memorialized Pearl Harbor Day by relighting the historic Beacon atop Mount Diablo's summit. A ceremony memorializing the attack on Pearl Harbor on December 7, 1941, is held at the Cal State East Bay Concord Campus, with some of the few remaining survivors who are present. (In 2020, the ceremony was virtual.) This ceremony is made possible due to the support of Mount Diablo State Park, California State University - East Bay: Concord Campus, Save Mount Diablo, CCTV, Vietnam Helicopters Museum, and the Sons and Daughters of Pearl Harbor Survivors.

Under cloudless conditions, more interesting than the sunset itself is the view of the progression of the mountain's shadow across the California Central Valley from the south to the distant Sierra Nevada to the north, finally appearing for a few moments above the horizon as a shadow in the post-sunset sky glow.

In April 1946, an Army C-45 transport plane crashed on the north side of the mountain, killing the pilot and co-pilot.

Save Mount Diablo sponsors many spring and fall schedules of events on the mountain, Spring on Diablo and Autumn on Diablo, as well as many other special events, including its anniversary event, Moonlight on the Mountain; Four Days Diablo, a trip on the Diablo Trail; the Mount Diablo Challenge, an annual hill climb to the summit with more than 1,100 cyclists each October; and the Mount Diablo Trail Adventure, combined 10k and half-marathon hikes and runs.

The park is popular in winter, when Bay Area residents can enjoy the rare experience of snowfall on the mountain. Snow occurs from the lower reaches of the park all the way to the peak, as was the case in February 2001 and February and March 2006. On Friday, March 10, 2006, an extremely cold storm moved into the region from the Gulf of Alaska, and noticeable amounts of snow fell in all regions of the Bay Area above 500 feet (152 m). The summit of the mountain received around six inches (15 cm) of snow at its peak, and the access roads were closed to automobiles at the 3,000 feet (914 m) mark due to the hazardous icy conditions above.

Occasionally there will be public access to astronomical observations made by a local astronomy club. This club was allocated a small parcel on the mountain and developed a permanent observatory at this location. The observatory has a computer-controlled telescope with a CCD camera.

=== Mount Diablo Challenge bicycle race ===
Mount Diablo
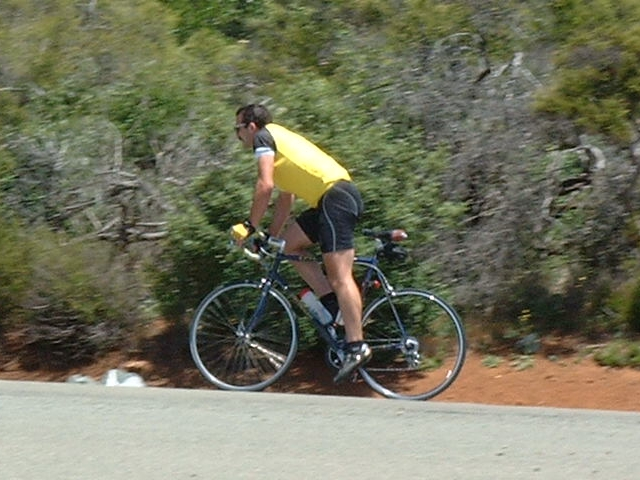
- A cyclist riding up Mount Diablo
- Gain in altitude: 3,249 ft (990 m)
- Length of climb: 10.8 mi (17.4 km)
- Maximum elevation: 3,849 ft (1,173 m)
- Average gradient: 5.7 %
- Maximum gradient: 13 %

The Mount Diablo Challenge is a bicycle race held annually on the first Sunday in October and benefiting non-profit, Save Mount Diablo's land preservation programs. The race begins at The Athenian School at the base of the mountain and climbs 3,249 feet (990.3 m) in 10.8 miles (17.4 km). The race typically draws between 800 and 1,100 riders each year who compete in a mass-start format. Bicycle riders of every age and ability are represented in the field, from weekend enthusiasts to top professionals. Prizes are typically awarded to the top overall male and female finishers, along with several age-specific categories. The most coveted prize is the special "One-Hour" T-shirts, awarded to those who finish the climb in less than one hour.

=== Course record ===
The course record for the Mount Diablo climb currently stands at 43 minutes, 33 seconds, set on October 5, 2008, by Nate English (ZteaM) four days after breaking his thumb in a bike accident. He broke the 44 minutes, 58 seconds record, set in 2004 by former professional cyclist Greg Drake (Webcor Cycling Team) of Redwood City, California. The previous course record was set by former professional cyclist Mike Engleman (Coors Light Pro Cycling Team) in 1990 with a time of 45 minutes, 20 seconds.

The fastest woman's time recorded at the Mount Diablo climb was set in 2012 by Flavia Oliveira (48 minutes, 13 seconds). In 2016, Oliveira competed at the Olympic Games in Rio de Janeiro, where she finished in seventh place.

Outside of the actual Mt Diablo Challenge each October, the climb is one of the more popular uploaded to Strava, with over 11,000 attempts recorded as of mid 2014. The top 10 times listed there are all from the Tour of California, which has used Mount Diablo as a stage several times. The fastest time (40:49) as of January 2021 is held by professional cyclist Lawson Craddock set in May 2013.

== In popular culture ==
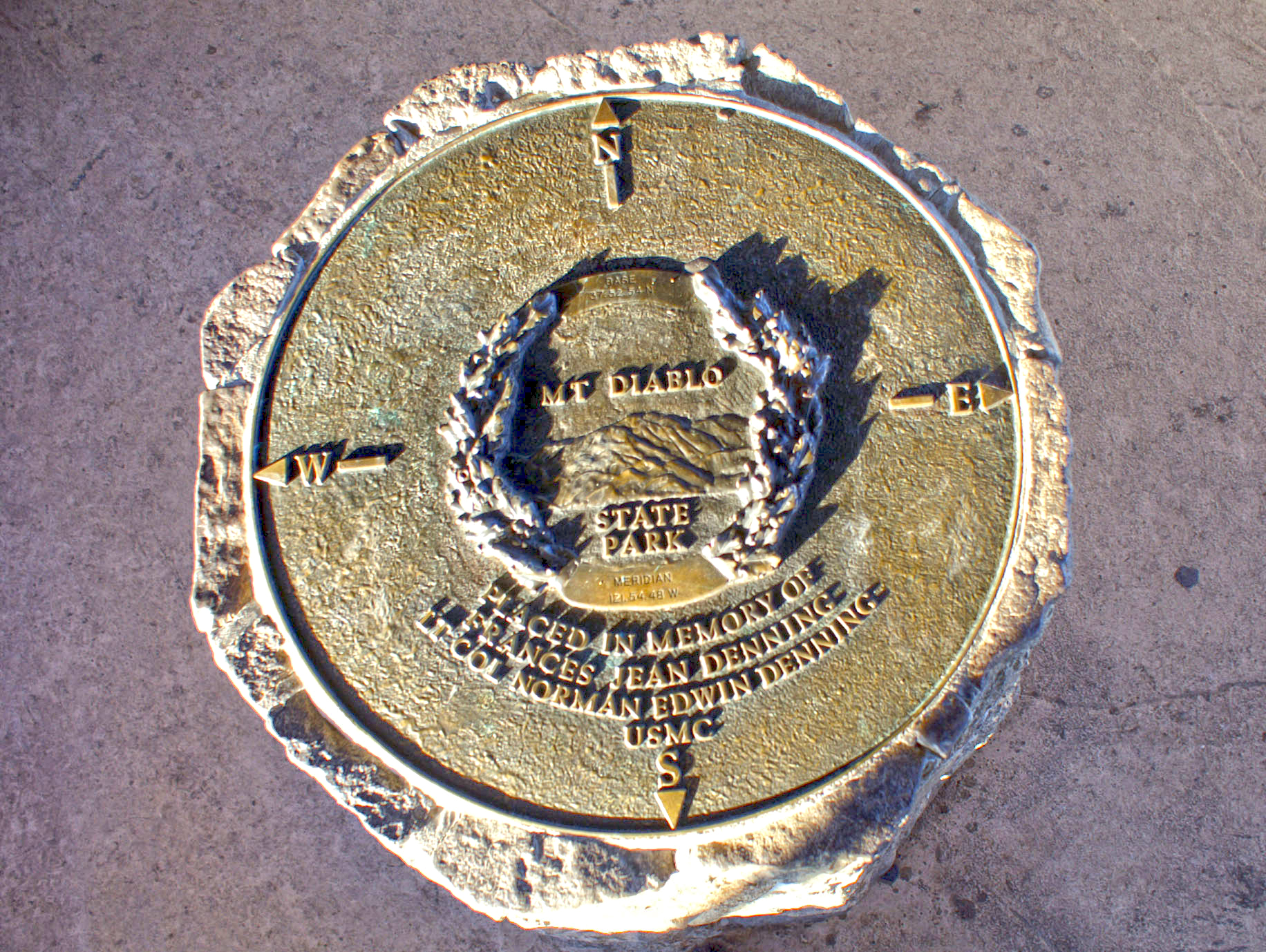
Mount Diablo Memorial Marker inside summit visitor center

- In Grand Theft Auto: San Andreas, Mount Chiliad is based on Mount Diablo. It reappears in Grand Theft Auto V.
- The silhouette of the mountain was used for the cover art of the books PiHKAL and TiHKAL by Alexander Shulgin.
- In the book The Lost Hero by Rick Riordan, Piper McLean's father is captured and held captive on the summit of Mount Diablo by Enceladus.
- The pop-punk band The Story So Far have a song named after the mountain on their debut record.
- In Marvel Comics, Tiamut was imprisoned under Mount Diablo for his actions against the other Celestials.

== Notable people ==
James "Grizzly" Adams was a frequent visitor and resident on Mount Diablo in the mid-1850s.

Robert Walter "Bob" Jones, the first professional baseball player from Contra Costa County, was born in the "Jones House" in Irish Canyon in 1889, an acquisition project of Save Mount Diablo.

On May 24, 1928, the Mount Diablo Ranch, or Diablo Ranch, ownership by Walter Paul Frick), a millionaire, who lived in Diablo, 2,250 acres (910 ha) from Mt. Diablo Development company, for $50,000, was announced.

== Legends and folklore ==
Mount Diablo has long been the site of numerous reports pertaining to cryptozoology, hauntings, mysterious lights, and various other Fortean phenomena (it is rumored that the name "Mount Diablo" is derived from the propensity for such weird events to be alleged at, or in the immediate vicinity of, the mountain). Phantom black "panthers" are seen with unusual frequency on the slopes of the mountain, as well as at the "Devil's Hole" region of the Las Trampas Regional Wilderness. As early as 1806, General Mariano Guadalupe Vallejo (July 4, 1807 – January 18, 1890) reported an encounter with a flying, spectral apparition, while engaged in military operations against the Bolgones band of the Bay Miwok tribe. In 1873, a live frog was said to be found within a slab of limestone at a mine on Mount Diablo.

== See also ==
- List of California county high points
- List of summits of the San Francisco Bay Area

Point	Coordinates (links to map & photo sources)	Notes
Mount Diablo	37.8817°N 121.9142°W	
North Peak	37.8930°N 121.9002°W	
High Sierra mountain peak	37.755°N 119.6657°W	Blocks view of Half Dome
