= Kyren Paris =

American baseball player (born 2001)

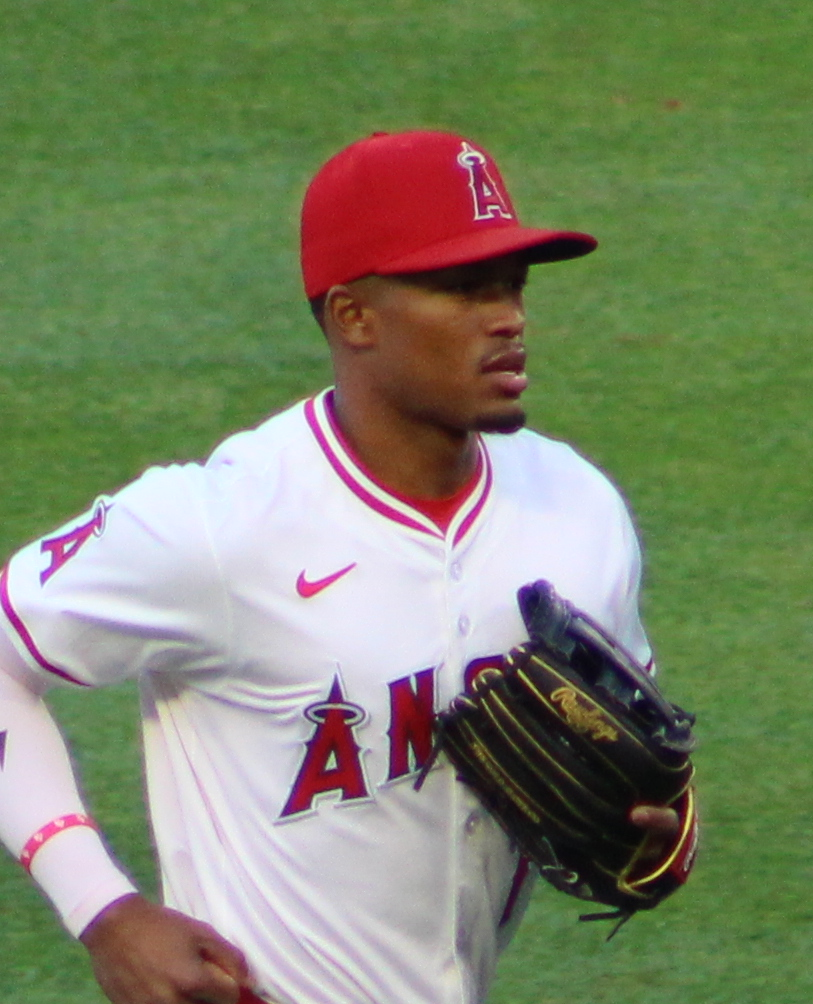
- Paris with the Los Angeles Angels in 2025

New York Mets
- Second baseman / Outfielder
- Born: November 11, 2001 (age 25); Oakley, California, U.S.
- Bats: Right Throws: Right

MLB debut
- September 1, 2023, for the Los Angeles Angels

MLB statistics (through 2026 season)
- Batting average: .147
- Home runs: 7
- Runs batted in: 17
- Stats at Baseball Reference

Teams
- Los Angeles Angels (2023–2026)

Kyren Terrell Paris (born November 11, 2001) is an American professional baseball second baseman and outfielder in the New York Mets organization. He has previously played in MLB for the Los Angeles Angels. He made his MLB debut in 2023.

== Career ==
=== Los Angeles Angels ===
Paris attended Freedom High School in Oakley, California. He was drafted by the Los Angeles Angels in the second round, with the 55th overall selection, of the 2019 Major League Baseball draft. He signed with the Angels rather than play college baseball at the University of California, Berkeley.

Paris made his professional debut with the Arizona League Angels with whom he appeared in three games. He did not play a minor league game in 2020 because the season was cancelled due to the COVID-19 pandemic. He started 2021 with the Inland Empire 66ers before being promoted to the Tri-City Dust Devils. Over 47 games between the two teams, he slashed .267/.388/.459 with four home runs, 25 RBIs, and 22 stolen bases. He missed two months due to a fractured fibula.

In 2023, Paris played in 113 games for the Double–A Rocket City Trash Pandas, hitting .255/.393/.417 with 14 home runs, 45 RBI, and 44 stolen bases. On September 1, 2023, Paris was selected to the 40-man roster and promoted to the major leagues for the first time. In 15 games for the Angels, he went 4–for–40 (.100) with 1 RBI and 3 stolen bases. On September 18, Paris was placed on the 60–day injured list with a ligament tear in his left thumb, ending his season.

Paris was optioned to the Triple–A Salt Lake Bees to begin the 2024 season. He appeared in 21 games for the Angels during the year, batting .118/.224/.216 with one home run, five RBI, and one stolen base. Paris made 44 appearances for Los Angeles during the 2025 season, hitting .190/.266/.381 with six home runs, 11 RBI, and seven stolen bases.

Paris was optioned to Triple-A Salt Lake to begin the 2026 season. Paris made eight total appearances for Los Angeles during the regular season, going hitless across 15 at–bats while recording three walks.

=== New York Mets ===
On October 29, 2026, Paris was claimed off waivers by the New York Mets. On November 2, Paris was designated for assignment by the Mets. On November 9, he cleared waivers and was sent outright to Triple-A.
