= Oakley Union Elementary School District =

Public school district in California, United States

Address
- 91 Mercedes Ln. Oakley, California, 94561; United States
- Coordinates: 37°58′54″N 121°43′00″W

District information
- Type: Public
- Grades: K–8
- Superintendent: Greg Hetrick
- Schools: 7 elementary (K–5); 2 middle (6–8)
- NCES District ID: 0628080

Students and staff
- Students: 5,098 (2023-24)
- Teachers: 215.55 (FTE) (2023-24)
- Student–teacher ratio: 23.65:1 (2023–24)

Other information
- Website: www.ouesd.k12.ca.us

Oakley Union Elementary School District is a public school district in Contra Costa County, California, United States. The district serves approximately 5000 students from grades K–8.

It includes most of Oakley, all of Bethel Island, and portions of the Knightsen census-designated place.

Oakley Union oversees nine public schools, including seven elementary schools (K–5) and two middle schools (6–8).

It feeds into Liberty Union High School District.

== History ==
In 1862, Sarah Sellers, one of city's first settlers opened the original Iron House School in Oakley.

In November 2004, the district passed Measure H, a fund to build Iron House Elementary School, Almond Grove Elementary School and the modernization of Oakley Elementary School and Gehringer Elementary School.

In February 2021, the entire school board for the district resigned after board members' "offensive" comments during a recorded online board meeting.

== Schools ==
Name	Students (Note: 2023–24 school year)	Grades
Almond Grove Elementary	453	K-5
Delta Vista Middle	900	6–8
Gehringer Elementary	666	K-5
Iron House Elementary	496	K-5
Laurel Elementary	367	K-5
O'Hara Park Middle	836	6–8
Oakley Elementary	371	K-5
Summer Lake Elementary	547	K-5
Vintage Parkway Elementary	452	K-5
