= Mountain House School District =

School district in California, United States

Location
- 3950 Mountain House Rd. Byron, California 94514 United States

Other information
- Website: www.mtnhouse.k12.ca.us

Mountain House School District is a public school district based in Alameda County, California, United States.
