= Knightsen, California =

Knightsen
- Unincorporated Community; Census Designated Place
- Location in Contra Costa County and the state of California
- Coordinates: 37°58′08″N 121°40′05″W
- Country: United States
- State: California
- County: Contra Costa

Government
  - State Senate: Christopher Cabaldon (D)
  - State Assembly: Lori Wilson (D)
  - U. S. Congress: Mark DeSaulnier (D)

Area
  - Total: 8.447 sq mi (21.88 km^{2})
  - Land: 8.357 sq mi (21.64 km^{2})
  - Water: 0.090 sq mi (0.23 km^{2}) 1.07%
- Elevation: 30 ft (9.1 m)

Population (2020)
  - Total: 1,596
  - Density: 191.0/sq mi (73.74/km^{2})
- Time zone: UTC-8 (PST)
  - Summer (DST): UTC-7 (PDT)
- ZIP code: 94548
- Area code: 925
- FIPS code: 06-38772
- GNIS feature IDs: 1658916, 2408496

Knightsen is a census-designated place (CDP) in Contra Costa County, California, United States. As of the 2020 census, the CDP population was 1,596.

== History ==
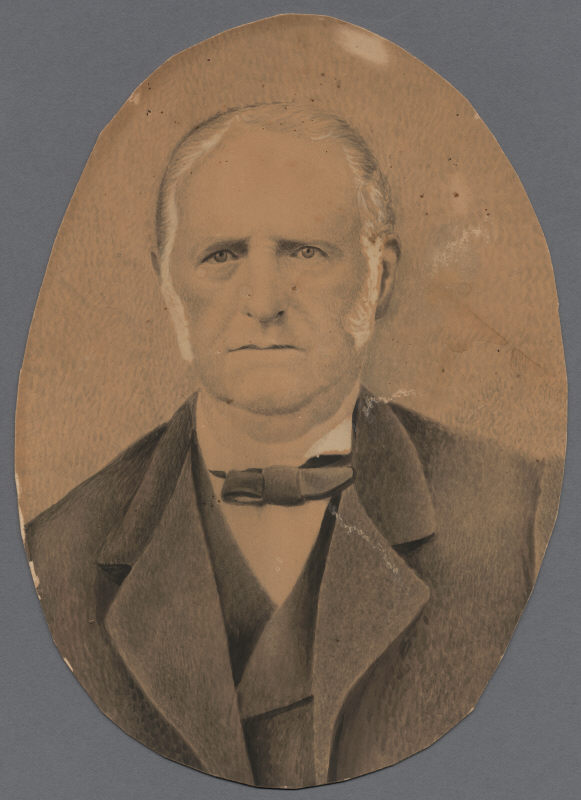
Don José Noriega, a wealthy Californio ranchero, was granted Rancho Los Méganos in 1835, covering all of modern Knightsen.

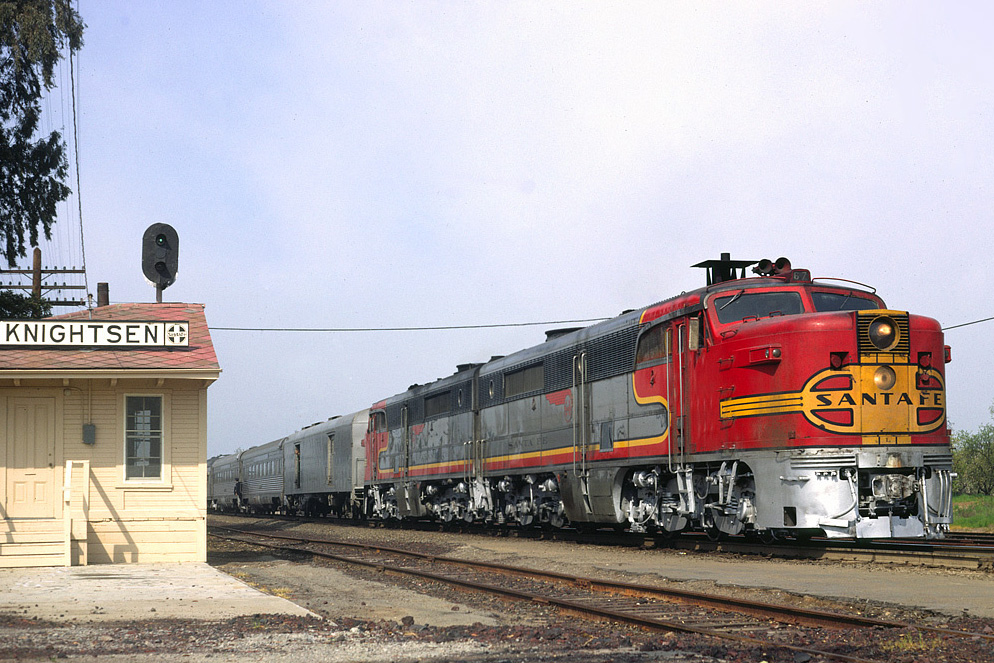
A Santa Fe Railroad charter train at Knightsen in 1968

Knightsen is a small, unincorporated community of 1,568 residents and 1,500 horses in far eastern Contra Costa County, California in the eastern San Francisco Bay Area closest to Oakley, California. The community was founded by George W. Knight, and its name is a portmanteau of his last name and his wife (Christina Christensen). Knightsen has the oldest chapter of the 4-H Club in California. The community worries about urban sprawl from expanding development in neighboring Oakley. However, a significant portion of the community lies within the agricultural conservation zone in the Brentwood, general plan.

During the 1880s, settlers began moving in and planting the first almond trees in the area. A few dairies also sprang up. Other crops, such as apricots, grapes and alfalfa were also planted. Until the railroad was built, farmers shipped their produce via water, using Babbes Landing off Dutch Slough, near the north end of what is now Sellers Avenue.

Knightsen was founded in 1898, when the Atchison Topeka and Santa Fe Railroad (Santa Fe Railway) was planning to lay a track through the area to reach Stockton, California. According to local historian, Kathy Leighton, the railroad wanted to name the community Meganos, commemorating the nearby ranch owned by Doctor John Marsh. Local settlers wanted to keep the name Knightsen. Through correspondence with officials in Washington, D.C., a post office named Knightsen was established before the railroad was complete, and George Knight was named first postmaster in mid-1899. He immediately constructed the first retail store in Knightsen, a grocery, in which he could also locate the post office, which opened in 1900.

The first buildings in Knightsen were a station house, a railroad station and a pumping plant, all belonging to the Santa Fe. After Knight's grocery, came the Lyon Brothers asparagus plant, which could ship two to four carloads of asparagus per day during the harvest season. The railroad made shipping crops much easier. Soon, six dairies were shipping an average of 2,500 U.S. gallons (9,500 L) of milk per day. During the 1920s, Knightsen was one of the largest milk shipping points in California.

Voters approved forming the Knightsen Irrigation District in 1920 to provide water to 10,000 acres (40,000,000 m^{2}) of farmland. The cost of the project then was $650,000. Even before the project was completed, the district was absorbed by the East Contra Costa Water District. The change from dry farming to irrigation brought other notable changes. The Knightsen Farm Bureau was organized in 1918. It built a hall in 1922 that has since been used for school graduations, dances, weddings, political functions, school plays, holiday celebrations, church services, a safe haven for flood victims and an endless list of other events. John N. Kristich, a pipe manufacturer from King City, California decided to build a plant for manufacturing concrete pipe in Knightsen. His firm became one of the largest producers of concrete pipe in California during the 1920s.

Knightsen has remained primarily a farming community, growing such foods as almonds, walnuts, sunflower seeds, etc. It still contains a few U-pick vegetable/fruit stands. Knightsen now is home to many horse ranches. One report even indicated that the community housed nearly as many horses (1500) as people (1568).

== Geography ==
According to the United States Census Bureau, the CDP has a total area of 8.5 square miles (22 km^{2}), 99% of it land.

== Demographics ==
Historical population
Census	Pop.	Note	%±
2000	861		—
2010	1,568		82.1%
2020	1,596		1.8%
U.S. Decennial Census; 1860–1870 1880-1890; 1900 1910 1920; 1930 1940 1950; 1960 1970 1980; 1990 2000 2010

Knightsen first appeared as a census designated place in the 2000 U.S. census.

=== Racial and ethnic composition ===
Knightsen CDP, California – Racial and ethnic composition Note: the US Census treats Hispanic/Latino as an ethnic category. This table excludes Latinos from the racial categories and assigns them to a separate category. Hispanics/Latinos may be of any race.
Race / Ethnicity (NH = Non-Hispanic)	Pop 2000	Pop 2010	Pop 2020	% 2000	% 2010	% 2020
White alone (NH)	578	1,023	883	67.13%	65.24%	55.33%
Black or African American alone (NH)	0	13	8	0.00%	0.83%	0.50%
Native American or Alaska Native alone (NH)	10	4	1	1.16%	0.26%	0.06%
Asian alone (NH)	2	27	25	0.23%	1.72%	1.57%
Native Hawaiian or Pacific Islander alone (NH)	6	3	2	0.70%	0.19%	0.13%
Other race alone (NH)	0	1	4	0.00%	0.06%	0.25%
Mixed race or Multiracial (NH)	37	43	86	4.30%	2.74%	5.39%
Hispanic or Latino (any race)	228	454	587	26.48%	28.95%	36.78%
Total	861	1,568	1,596	100.00%	100.00%	100.00%

=== 2020 census ===
As of the 2020 census, Knightsen had a population of 1,596 and a population density of 191.0 inhabitants per square mile (73.7/km^{2}). The median age was 40.7 years. The age distribution was 21.9% under the age of 18, 9.3% aged 18 to 24, 23.2% aged 25 to 44, 29.9% aged 45 to 64, and 15.7% aged 65 or older. For every 100 females, there were 108.9 males, and for every 100 females age 18 and over, there were 114.3 males age 18 and over.

The census reported that 100% of the population lived in households. In addition, 16.7% of residents lived in urban areas and 83.3% lived in rural areas.

There were 529 households, out of which 34.2% had children under the age of 18. Of all households, 60.1% were married-couple households, 5.9% were cohabiting couple households, 16.1% had a female householder with no spouse or partner present, and 18.0% had a male householder with no spouse or partner present. About 16.1% of households were made up of individuals, and 6.4% had someone living alone who was 65 years of age or older. The average household size was 3.02. There were 406 families (76.7% of all households).

There were 556 housing units at an average density of 66.5 units per square mile (25.7 units/km^{2}). Of the total housing units, 95.1% were occupied and 4.9% were vacant. The homeowner vacancy rate was 1.3% and the rental vacancy rate was 6.2%. Among occupied units, 74.1% were owner-occupied and 25.9% were occupied by renters.

== Education ==
Almost all of the CDP is within the Knightsen Elementary School District while a small portion is within the Oakley Union Elementary School District. All of the CDP is served by the Liberty Union High School District.

== Notable person ==
- Jeremy Newberry, NFL player.
