= Liberty Union =

Liberty Union may refer to:

- Liberty Union High School, high school in Ohio
- Liberty Union High School District, school district in California
- Liberty Union Party, political party active in Vermont
- Lithuanian Liberty Union, defunct political party in Lithuania
