= Freedom High School (Oakley, California) =

Location
- 1050 Neroly Road; Oakley, California 94561-3843; United States; 37.970°N 121.720°W

Information
- Type: 4A
- Established: 1996
- Superintendent: Eric Volta
- Principal: Steve Amaro
- Teaching staff: 116.68 (FTE)
- Grades: 9–12
- Enrollment: 2,478 (2023–2024)
- Student to teacher ratio: 21.24
- Colours: Navy blue, silver, and maroon
- Athletics conference: CIF Bay Valley Athletic League
- Mascot: Falcon
- Nickname: Falcons
- Website: Freedom High School

Freedom High School is located in Oakley, California, United States. It opened in 1996 on the grounds of Liberty High School, before moving to the new campus, as a part of the Liberty Union High School District. The current Liberty Union High School District contains Freedom, Heritage, Independence, La Paloma, and Liberty high schools.

== History ==
Liberty Union High School District opened Freedom High School in 1996. Because all the new students were freshmen, the school did not have a graduating class in 1996. In 1997, the school's administration offices, library, gym, and the classrooms were built by the S.J. Amoroso Construction Company of Foster City, California.

On April 1, 1997, the new Freedom High School buildings was opened in Oakley, California. When it opened in Oakley, approximately 600 students which is attending Liberty Union High School in Brentwood were switched to Freedom.

Plans for the new classrooms at Freedom were announced in late 1997. In 1999, the Oakley Public Library was merged with the Freedom Library to form a joint-use library.

Freedom High School is currently ranked #9,782 in national rankings by U.S. News and World Report.

== Athletics ==
Freedom High School is known as the Falcons, as of 2025 Freedom offers multiple sports which all compete in Bay Valley Athletic League

- Baseball
- Basketball
- Cheerleading
- Cross-Country
- Football
- Golf
- Soccer
- Softball
- Swimming & Diving
- Tennis
- Track & Field
- Volleyball
- Water Polo
- Wrestling
- Bowling
- E-Sports

== If You Really Knew Me ==
Freedom High School was featured on the 2010 MTV reality show If You Really Knew Me. The show chronicles high schools across the nation undergoing a "challenge day" where students share their stories. The idea of challenge day is to break down cliques within the school, especially those that result from racism. The school now has an on-campus group that holds mini challenge days frequently for classes.

== Notable alumni ==
- Joe Mixon (2014), running back for the Houston Texans
- Ronnie Rivers (2017), running back for the Los Angeles Rams
- Kyle Harmon (2018), college football linebacker for the San Jose State Spartans
- Kyren Paris (2019), shortstop for Los Angeles Angels
- Joey Aguilar (2021), quarterback for the Tennessee Volunteers

== See also ==
- List of high schools in California
