= Knightsen Elementary School District =

School district in California, United States

Address
- 1923 Delta Road Knightsen, California, 94548; United States

District information
- Type: Public
- Grades: K–8
- Established: 1867
- Superintendent: Harvey Yurkovich
- Schools: 2
- NCES District ID: 0620040

Students and staff
- Students: 596
- Teachers: 27.56 (FTE)
- Student–teacher ratio: 21.63:1

Other information
- Website: www.knightsen.k12.ca.us

Knightsen Elementary School District is a public school district based in Contra Costa County, California. The district serves approximately 600 students from grades K–8.

It includes almost all of Knightsen and portions of Brentwood and Oakley and Discovery Bay.

It feeds into Liberty Union High School District.

== History ==
In November 1996, Knightsen Elementary School District announced that it will end its free busing because at the time, Knightsen has four school buses; two buses that were over 20 years old, one bus that was purchased in 1984, and another one that was purchased in 1989.

In November 1997, with the support of the district's Measure C program, Knightsen ESD announced it will replace its aging 23-year old School Bus #2 with a 1998 Thomas Saf-T-Liner MVP ER model, also numbered as #2.

== Schools ==
- Knightsen Elementary School (1923 Delta Ave)
- Old River Elementary School (30 Learning Lane) located outside of Knightsen
