= Area code 925 =

Area code in California, United States

Coordinates: 37.9°N 122°W

Numbering plan areas in California (blue) and border states. Area code 925 is shown in red.

Area code 925 is a telephone area code in the North American Numbering Plan for a northern part of the U.S. state of California. It was created in an area code split of area code 510 in 1998. The numbering plan area comprises the inland portions of the East Bay counties of Alameda and Contra Costa.

== History ==
The numbering plan area (NPA) was originally served with area code 415, one of the first three area codes of California in 1947, which originally was assigned to central California. In 1991, area code 510 was created to serve most of the East Bay. Area code 925 was created March 14, 1998, when area code 510 was split along the natural border of the Berkeley Hills.

Prior to October 2021, area code 925 had telephone numbers assigned for the central office code 988. In 2020, 988 was designated nationwide as a dialing code for the National Suicide Prevention Lifeline, which created a conflict for exchanges that permit seven-digit dialing. The area code was therefore transitioned to ten-digit dialing on October 24, 2021.

== Service area ==
The numbering plan area includes southeastern Alameda County (Dublin, Pleasanton, Livermore, Sunol, and unincorporated areas surrounding those communities), and all of Contra Costa County except the western part (El Cerrito to Crockett).

=== Alameda County ===
- Altamont
- Dougherty
- Dublin
- East Pleasanton
- Kilkare Woods
- Livermore
- Pleasanton
- San Ramon Village
- Sunol
- Ulmar

=== Contra Costa County ===
- Alamo
- Alamo Oaks
- Antioch
- Bay Point
- Bethel Island
- Bixler
- Blackhawk
- Brentwood
- Byron
- Camino Tassajara
- Canyon
- Clayton
- Clyde
- Concord
- Contra Costa Centre
- Danville
- Diablo
- Discovery Bay
- Knightsen
- Lafayette
- Marsh Creek Springs
- Martinez
- Mococo
- Moraga
- Norris Canyon
- Oakley
- Orinda
- Orwood
- Pacheco
- Pittsburg
- Pleasant Hill
- San Ramon
- Saranap
- Shore Acres
- Vine Hill
- Walnut Creek

== See also ==
- List of California area codes

California area codes: 209/350, 213/323, 310/424, 408/669, 415/628, 510/341, 530, 559, 562, 619/858, 626, 650, 661, 707/369, 714/657, 760/442, 805/820, 818/747, 831, 909/840, 916/279, 925, 949, 951
| | North: 707/369, 916/279 | |
| West: 510/341 | 925 | East: 209/350 |
| | South: 408/669 | |
