= Patriots Jet Team =

American civilian aerobatic team

- Patriots Jet Team logo
- Active: 2003–present
- Country: United States
- Branch: Civilian
- Role: Aerobatic jet demonstration team
- Size: 8 pilots, 25 volunteers
- Garrison/HQ: Byron Airport
- Website: patriotsjetteam.com

Aircraft flown
- Trainer: Aero L-39 Albatros
- Transport: North American Sabreliner

The Patriots Jet Team is a civilian aerobatic formation team based in Byron, California. The team operates as a six-ship team, flying the Czech-built Aero L-39 Albatros. The team is owned by Randy Howell, a former United Airlines pilot, and is supported by a ground crew of more than 25 volunteers.

The team's performance lasts 26 minutes and includes formation flying, opposing passes, and solo maneuvers such as the team's signature tail slide maneuver. They perform in airshows across the western United States of America.

== Overview ==
The Patriots Jet Team began when Randy Howell purchased the team's first L-39 in 1999. The team began flying demonstrations in 2003 with two L-39 aircraft. In the 2004 airshow season, a third L-39 was added. With the success of the 2005 season, the Patriots added a fourth jet for the 2006 season. In 2011, the Patriots Jet Team expanded to a six-ship aerobatic formation team.

The Patriots Jet Team's jets are modified for airshow use including upgraded avionics systems, removal of excess weight, the addition of a 30-gallon smoke oil system, and are painted glossy black with red accents.

The team's pilots are composed of civilian and military pilots who were formerly part of the United States Air Force Thunderbirds and United States Navy Blue Angels.

Besides air shows, the Patriots Jet Team provides services such as event flyovers, upset prevention recovery training, and aerial filming with partner X-Brand using two of the team's jets. Additionally, the team helped produce Top Gun: Maverick where they trained the actors and performed aerial stunts.

== Fleet ==
Aircraft	Mission	In fleet
Aero L-39 Albatros	Airshows, Upset Prevention Recovery Training	8
Mikoyan-Gurevich MiG-17	Airshows	2
Rockwell Sabreliner 60	Airshows, Upset Prevention Recovery Training, Team Support	2
