= Byron Union School District =

School district in California, United States

Address
- 14301 Byron Highway Byron, California, 94514; United States

District information
- Type: Public
- Grades: K–8
- Superintendent: Crystal Castaneda
- Schools: 2 elementary (K–5); 1 middle (6–8)
- NCES District ID: 0606750

Students and staff
- Students: 1,240
- Teachers: 60.06 (FTE)
- Student–teacher ratio: 20.65:1

Other information
- Website: www.byronunionschooldistrict.us

Byron Union School District is a public school district based in Contra Costa County, California. It serves the communities of Byron and Discovery Bay.

It feeds into Liberty Union High School District.

== Schools ==
- Byron Institute for Independent Study
- Discovery Bay Elementary School
- Excelsior Middle School (Byron)
- Timber Point Elementary School (Discovery Bay)
