= Discovery Bay, California =

Discovery Bay
- Census-designated place
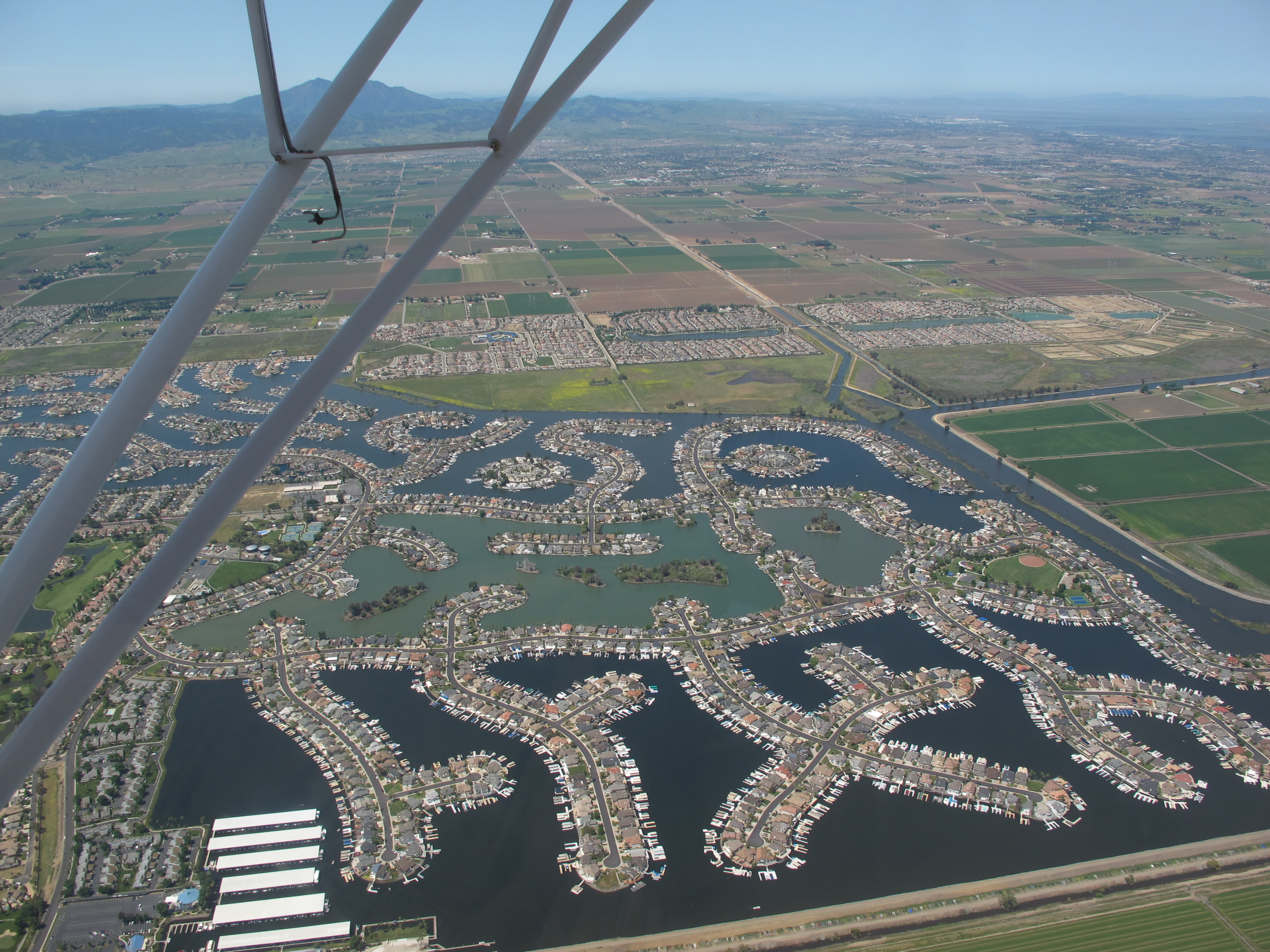
- Aerial view of Discovery Bay

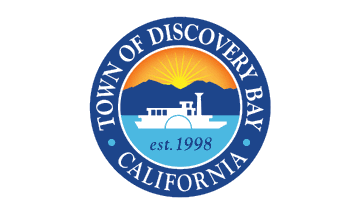
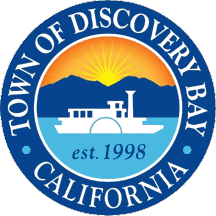
- Flag Seal
- Interactive map of Discovery Bay
- Location in the United States
- Coordinates: 37°54′31″N 121°36′01″W
- Country: United States
- State: California
- County: Contra Costa
- Established: 1964

Government
  - State Senate: Christopher Cabaldon (D)
  - State Assembly: Lori Wilson (D)
  - U. S. Congress: Josh Harder (D)

Area
  - Total: 6.95 sq mi (18.00 km^{2})
  - Land: 5.59 sq mi (14.48 km^{2})
  - Water: 1.36 sq mi (3.51 km^{2}) 19.5%
- Elevation: 7 ft (2.1 m)

Population (2020)
  - Total: 15,358
  - Density: 2,746.6/sq mi (1,060.47/km^{2})
- Time zone: UTC−08:00 (PST)
  - Summer (DST): UTC−07:00 (PDT)
- ZIP Code: 94505
- Area code: 925
- FIPS code: 06-19339
- GNIS feature IDs: 1701762, 2408672
- Website: https://www.todb.ca.gov/

Discovery Bay is a census-designated place (CDP) in eastern Contra Costa County, California, United States, approximately 60 miles (97 km) from San Francisco. It is located in the San Francisco Bay Area. As of 2020, its population was 15,358, a 15% percent gain from 13,352 at the 2010 census.

Discovery Bay was originally a waterfront community built on a network of man-made waterways and residential islands, except for the southeastern quadrant, which comprises the golf course of Discovery Bay Country Club. The homes generally have private docks with access to the Sacramento–San Joaquin River Delta. Newer developments have been added on former agricultural land to the north and west of the initial town-site. Road access is via Route 4.

== History ==
Discovery Bay began as a planned community in 1964, and originally designated as "Riverside" and "River Lake." It was built on land known as the Byron Tract, which was previously used for growing barley and potatoes. In 1968, Jurgen Lunding led an effort to give the community its current name.

In July 2007, Discovery Bay received its own ZIP code: 94505. Formerly, it had shared 94514 with Byron. The ensuing celebration included a paddle boat raft-up that set a world record.

== Geography ==
According to the United States Census Bureau, the CDP has a total area of 6.9 square miles (18 km^{2}), of which 5.6 square miles (15 km^{2}) is land and 1.4 square miles (3.6 km^{2}) (19.5%) is water.

Nineteen miles of 100-year flood protection levees maintained by Reclamation District 800 provide flood protection for part of the reclaimed swampland beneath Discovery Bay, though most residences (the waterfront properties with San Francisco Bay delta access) are not levee-protected.

== Government ==
Discovery Bay is one of the unincorporated areas in California that has a community services district (CSD), a special district that provides some basic services that are usually provided by the county. The primary duties of the area's community services district, known as The Town of Discovery Bay Community Services District, are handling water, sewer, landscaping and recreation. The CSD Board has five members who are elected by community residents. While the CSD Board has no land use or zoning authority, the CSD can advise the county on decisions related to police and fire services, residential and commercial development, and more.

In December 2016, the CSD Board announced that Discovery Bay resident Mike Davies would become the general manager of CSD, effective January 3, 2017. He would replace the interim manager, Catherine Kutsuris. Davies had served as a police officer in Brentwood, California, including five years as chief of police there. Retiring from Brentwood Police Department in 2006, he was hired at the California Police Officers Standards and Training organization in Sacramento.

== Demographics ==
Historical population
Census	Pop.	Note	%±
1980	1,326		—
1990	5,351		303.5%
2000	8,981		67.8%
2010	13,352		48.7%
2020	15,358		15.0%
U.S. Decennial Census; 1860–1870 1880-1890; 1900 1910 1920; 1930 1940 1950; 1960 1970 1980; 1990 2000 2010; 2020

Discovery Bay first appeared as a census designated place in the 1980 United States census.

=== Racial and ethnic composition ===
Discovery Bay CDP, California – Racial and ethnic composition Note: the US Census treats Hispanic/Latino as an ethnic category. This table excludes Latinos from the racial categories and assigns them to a separate category. Hispanics/Latinos may be of any race.
Race / Ethnicity (NH = Non-Hispanic)	Pop 2000	Pop 2010	Pop 2020	% 2000	% 2010	% 2020
White alone (NH)	7,406	9,659	9,734	82.46%	72.34%	63.38%
Black or African American alone (NH)	157	530	722	1.75%	3.97%	4.70%
Native American or Alaska Native alone (NH)	59	67	36	0.66%	0.50%	0.23%
Asian alone (NH)	159	509	880	1.77%	3.81%	5.73%
Native Hawaiian or Pacific Islander alone (NH)	12	41	71	0.13%	0.31%	0.46%
Other race alone (NH)	15	17	62	0.17%	0.13%	0.40%
Mixed race or Multiracial (NH)	236	455	988	2.63%	3.41%	6.43%
Hispanic or Latino (any race)	937	2,074	2,865	10.43%	15.53%	18.65%
Total	8,981	13,352	15,358	100.00%	100.00%	100.00%

=== 2020 census ===
As of the 2020 census, Discovery Bay had a population of 15,358. The population density was 2,746.4 inhabitants per square mile (1,060.4/km^{2}). The median age was 43.9 years. 22.5% of residents were under the age of 18 and 17.4% of residents were 65 years of age or older. For every 100 females there were 101.0 males, and for every 100 females age 18 and over there were 98.1 males age 18 and over.

99.6% of residents lived in urban areas, while 0.4% lived in rural areas.

There were 5,525 households in Discovery Bay, of which 32.8% had children under the age of 18 living in them. Of all households, 63.3% were married-couple households, 6.6% were cohabiting couple households, 14.4% were households with a male householder and no spouse or partner present, and 15.8% were households with a female householder and no spouse or partner present. About 16.6% of all households were made up of individuals and 7.7% had someone living alone who was 65 years of age or older. The average household size was 2.78. There were 4,267 families (77.2% of all households).

There were 6,063 housing units at an average density of 1,084.2 units per square mile (418.6 units/km^{2}), of which 5,525 (91.1%) were occupied and 538 (8.9%) were vacant. Of occupied units, 83.7% were owner-occupied and 16.3% were occupied by renters. The homeowner vacancy rate was 1.4% and the rental vacancy rate was 3.8%.

=== Income and poverty ===
In 2023, the US Census Bureau estimated that the median household income was $154,792, and the per capita income was $64,234. About 5.0% of families and 6.0% of the population were below the poverty line.

== Education ==
Almost all of Discovery Bay CDP is in the Byron Union School District, while a small portion of the CDP is in the Knightsen Elementary School District. All of it is in the Liberty Union High School District.

There are two K–5 schools in the Byron district, and both were named California Distinguished Schools in 2012: Discovery Bay Elementary and Timber Point Elementary. Excelsior Middle School is located in Byron and is the district's sole 6–8 school. Major renovations and new buildings were completed at Excelsior Middle School in 2012. It was a California Distinguished School in early 2004. High school students (9–12) in all of Discovery Bay are zoned to attend Liberty High School in the Liberty Union High School District, located in nearby Brentwood. Liberty High School students have founded an arts group known as "PADA" and have arranged with city officials to allow select students to paint and personalize certain electrical boxes, walls, etc. in the theme of the town. Plans for a fifth high school on the south side of State Route 4 are on hold.
