= Bethel Island =

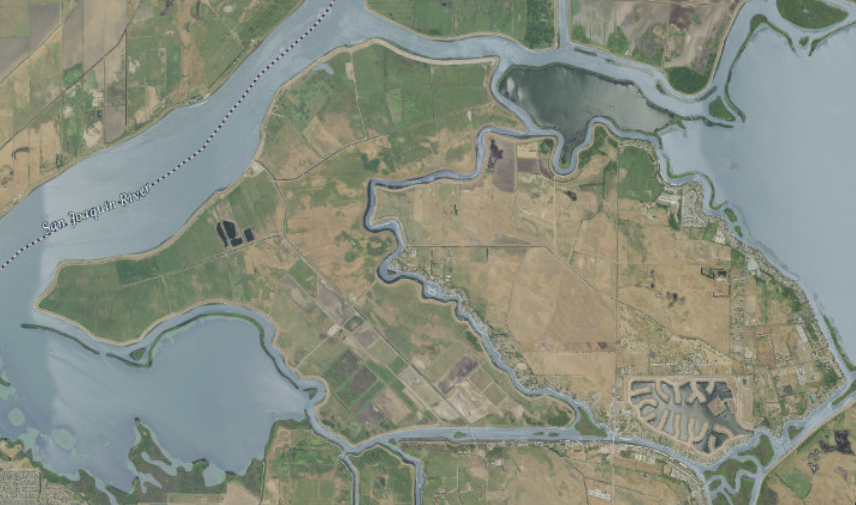
- USGS aerial imagery of Bethel Island (right) and Jersey Island (left).

- Location within Sacramento-San Joaquin River Delta Location within San Francisco Bay Area Location within California Location within the United States

Geography
- Location: Northern California
- Coordinates: 38.03131°N 121.640787°W
- Adjacent to: San Joaquin River
- Area: 3,500 acres (1,400 ha)

Administration
- United States
- State: California
- County: Contra Costa

Demographics
- Population: approx. 3700

Bethel Island
- Census-designated place
- Interactive map of Bethel Island
- Coordinates: 38°00′54″N 121°38′26″W
- Country: United States
- State: California
- County: Contra Costa

Government
  - Type: Special act district
  - State Senator: Jesse Arreguín (D)
  - State Assembly: Lori Wilson (D)
  - U. S. Congress: Josh Harder (D)

Area
  - Total: 5.82 sq mi (15.07 km^{2})
  - Land: 5.25 sq mi (13.60 km^{2})
  - Water: 0.57 sq mi (1.47 km^{2}) 0%
- Elevation: −6.6 ft (−2 m)

Population (2020)
  - Total: 2,131
  - Density: 405.8/sq mi (156.69/km^{2})
- Time zone: UTC-8 (PST)
  - Summer (DST): UTC-7 (PDT)
- ZIP code: 94511
- Area code: 925
- FIPS code: 06-06210
- GNIS feature IDs: 1658045, 2407834

Contra Costa County, California Incorporated and Unincorporated areas with Bethel Island Highlighted.

Bethel Island is an island in the Sacramento–San Joaquin River Delta of Contra Costa County, California, United States, approximately 10 kilometres (6.2 mi) east of Antioch. The island describes itself as "the heart of the California Delta."

Bethel Island (formerly known as Bethell, Bethell Ranch, Bethel Tract, Sand Mound Ranch, Sand Mound Tract) is also a census-designated place (CDP) on the island. The population at the 2020 census was 2,131. The community of Bethel Island is governed as a Special Act District created by the California State legislature and named the Bethel Island Municipal Improvement District (BIMID). It is a popular destination for recreation seekers, especially hunters, fishermen, boaters, and bird watchers.

== History ==
Bethel Island was named for the Bethell Brothers, Frank and Warren Bethell, who formed the first successful farm on the island, called Sand Mound Ranch.

The landform known as Bethel Island was created between 1859 and 1870 by several men, see the names and survey numbers below. (Source: California State Archives for Land Patent Certificate of Purchase for Swamp and Overflow Surveys Numbers 80, 81, 82, 83, 225, 226, 227 and 250). Alonzo Stone purchased much of the property formerly owned by Warren and Anne Bethell, and the area was briefly referred to as the "Stone Tract" in the 1930s. Prior to this, it was referred to as "Sandmound Ranch", "Sandmound Tract" or "Bethel Tract" and contained an estimated area of 6,000 acres (24 km^{2}), and did not become an island until 1911, when Dutch Slough was dredged eastward to join with Sandmound Slough. East Contra Costa Historical Society has been made aware of these inaccuracies, however has not yet updated their website.

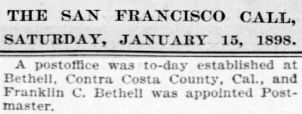
Newspaper clipping from San Francisco Call January 15, 1898

The first post office opened in 1898, and named for its first postmaster Franklin Cloud Bethell. The second "L" was dropped by a rather pious postal commissioner that reportedly felt it would be ungodly to allow the new location to be called "Bet Hell", and took liberties to change it to "Bethel" (בית אל), meaning "House of God" in Hebrew. The post office closed in 1902. A Post Office re-opened on Bethel Island in 1947.

Though it was common for the era to name the post office after the postmaster, and for the communities to assume the name of the post office, there are some references to the area as "Bethell" referring to the Sand Mound Ranch farm established by a coalition led by Franklin's older brother, Warren King Bethell, Nicholas Harris (Sheriff of San Jose) and James C. Smith. Prior "owners" of these lands were considered "land speculators" and only performed the minimum amount of improvements to reclaim the land in order to secure land patents. This may not be a fair assessment of all, since some did make an honest attempt to reclaim the lands only to be forced out by changes in governmental policy and financial constraints.

Actual "ownership" of the lands was accomplished through a long process of applications, surveys, improvements and Patents, as defined by the frequently amended Swamp and Overflow Lands Act. The first applications for land patents for what is now Bethel Island, Jersey Island, Franks Tract and Webb Tract, were secured by early California pioneers (the patent number precedes the name, and the date of application follows): 80-H. L. Henderon (1859), 81-Jabez Hatch (1859), 82-Elijah Hook (1859), 83-Stephen C. Vaughn (1859), 221-Edward P. Paine (1865), 222-John F. Arnold (1865), 223-John P. Curtis (1865), 224-Jessa Cheney (1865), 225-William Nye (1865), 226-Stephen L. Piper (1865), 227-D. J. West (1865), 250-Benjamin Taylor (1865), 284-Thomas Murphy (1868) and 297-C. C. Web (1868). Through the remainder of the 1860s and most of the 1870s, interest in several of these lands were traded or sold, passing to Cheney (who later partnered with Van W. Phillips), Hatch, Piper and Taylor. Also, interest in some of the lands were acquired by such notable names in the Delta as J. B. Haggin and A. E. Davis, and by G. D. Roberts and A. G. Kimbell. It might be of interest to note that Elijah Hook later helped establish the city of Oakland to be a distinct and separate entity from San Francisco, and Van W. Phillips was instrumental in the creation of the city of Antioch. Jabez Hatch's wife, Mary, was sister to Elijah Hook.

=== Bethells ===
Warren King Bethell was born in 1823 in Indiana to the Reverend Cloud Bethell, served in the Mexican War, and then came to California via the Isthmus of Panama in 1854. There, he engaged in mining for a few months, then settled in Santa Clara County, buying 250 acres on Almaden Road. On August 15, 1856, Warren married Ann Youree Hamilton. In 1871, Warren and Ann moved to San Jose and ran a Livery business. In 1872, along with Nicholas Harris and James C. Smith, Warren purchased the 3500 acre Sand Mound Ranch from Jessa Cheney and Van W. Phillips (Phillips went on to help establish the town of Antioch, California.)

Warren encouraged his younger brother, Franklin, to move West to assist in this new venture. Franklin C. Bethell (born: Cloud Franklyn Bethell) was born in 1833, 10 years junior to Warren, married Lucy Maria Hazen on June 2, 1857, in Indiana. Frank and Lucy had no children. There, Franklin did not appear to prosper in any noted occupation. Newspaper records of the time show Franklin as a frequent occupant of several of the finer hotels in San Francisco, Sacramento, and Brentwood. It is unclear if Franklin was employed by the Sand Mound Ranch, or if he had other means of income. After the death of his brother Warren, Franklin did purchase the lands that were previously held by Nicholas Harris, presumably using money inherited from his brother. Lands that were specifically titled to Warren went to his wife Ann. Frank Bethell and Warren Bethell's widow, Ann Youree (Hamilton) Bethell sold their interest in the island in 1901, much of it to Alonzo Stone. Ann went on to form a successful ranch in Almaden Valley and established the Bethell Block in downtown San Jose (site of the current Federal Building). The portion of the land along the levee of Taylor Slough were held by James C. Smith stayed with his descendants until 1941.

In 1898, Franklin was appointed Post Master for the local post office, run out of his house near Horseshoe Bend. Prior to 1898, mail was delivered to the Post Office at Jersey Landing, and special service carried mail to the Sand Mound Ranch from there. A pious clerk at the U.S. Postal office did not want the name "Bet Hell" and dropped the additional "L" to make it "Bethel", like the Hebrew term בית אל beth el which translates to "House of God," Franklin's post office closed in 1902, however the name Bethel(l) was now officially tied to the locality.

=== 20th century ===
A one-lane wooden bridge was built in 1911, but was removed by order of the Army Corps of Engineers. After litigation, it was ordered to be replaced in 1921. In the late 1930s a resort was created by Houston (Jack) Farrar and his wife Blanche (Ruby), with a recreational area for picnics and swimming. Known as Farrar Park, it was the first recreational business on the island. Hunters, fishermen, and boaters began buying property after World War II.

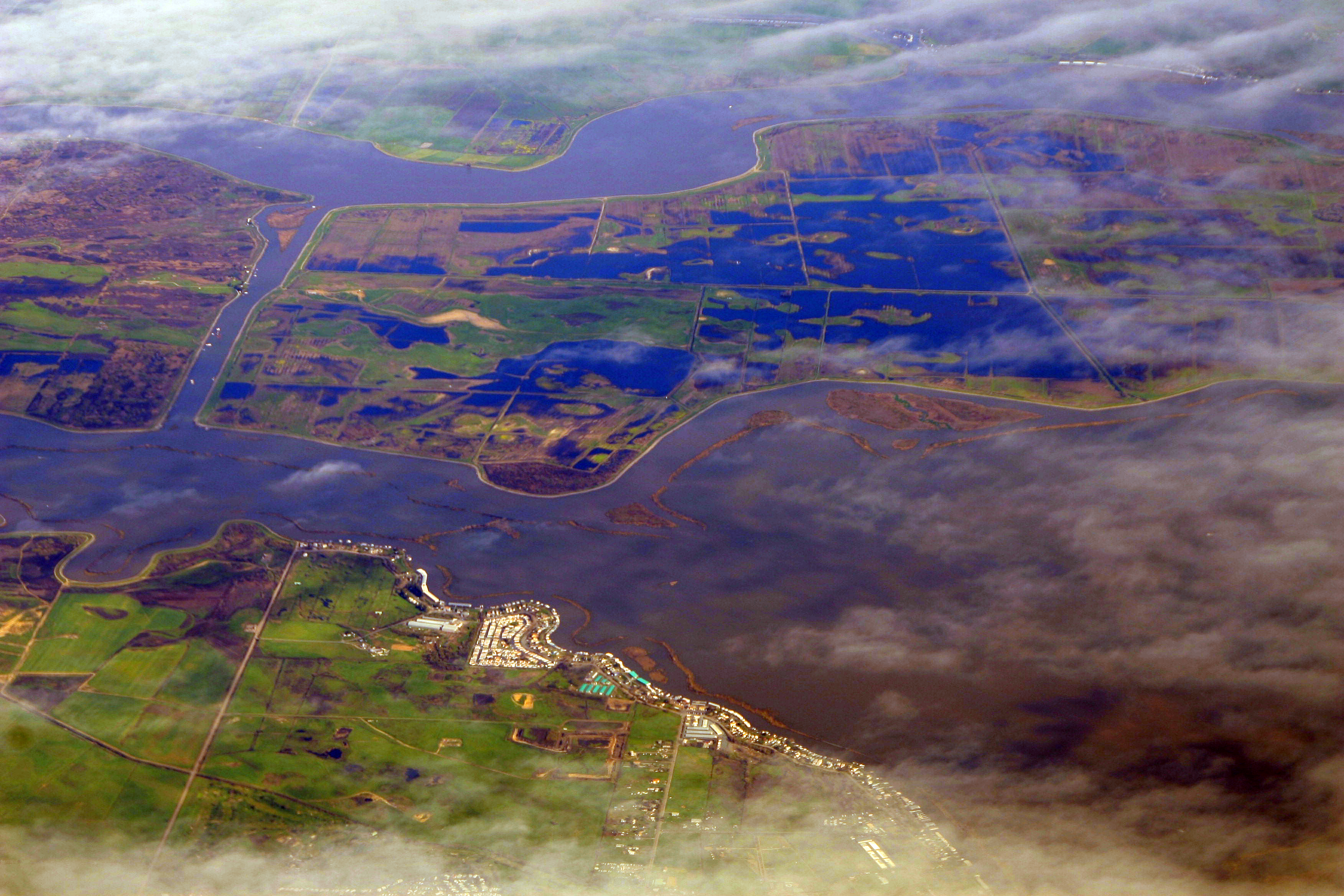
California Delta at flood stage, 2009. Bethel Island is at bottom left of image.

Remsburg Marina was started by Warren Remsburg in 1938, and in 1944 a fishing resort called Frank's had gained popularity on the island. The resort was built by the Andronico family.

Electricity was first supplied in 1946, and telephone service arrived in 1949. From then on, Bethel Island became an increasingly popular recreation spot.

By the 1950s the area became popular with sport fishermen and the rich.

=== 21st century ===
In 2019, construction began on Delta Coves, a development of 494 homes built around a man-made lagoon on top of a double levee. A housing development in that location had been proposed in the 1970s, but had been held up by lawsuits and financial problems.

Bethel Island is now the most densely populated island in the delta. The community calls itself "The Heart of the Delta."

== Geography ==
According to the United States Census Bureau, the CDP has a total area of 5.1 square miles (13 km^{2}), all land. It is located on an island of the same name 9 miles (14 km) east of Antioch. The island is surrounded by Taylor, Piper, Dutch and Sandmound Sloughs, and protected by 11.5 miles (18.5 km) of earthen levees. The only land access is a bridge that connects Bethel Island Road to Cypress Road in Oakley.

Other nearby communities are Oakley, which adjoins Bethel Island on the west-southwest, Knightsen and Brentwood, which is south of the island.

== Climate ==
According to the Köppen Climate Classification system, Bethel Island has a warm-summer Mediterranean climate, abbreviated "Csa" on climate maps.

== Demographics ==
Historical population
Census	Pop.	Note	%±
1970	1,398		—
1980	1,774		26.9%
1990	2,115		19.2%
2000	2,312		9.3%
2010	2,137		−7.6%
2020	2,131		−0.3%
U.S. Decennial Census; 1850–1870 1880-1890; 1900 1910 1920; 1930 1940 1950; 1960 1970 1980; 1990 2000 2010

Bethel Island first appeared as an unincorporated community in the 1970 U.S. census; and as a census-designated place in the 1980 United States census.

=== 2020 census ===
Bethel Island CDP, California – Racial and ethnic composition Note: the US Census treats Hispanic/Latino as an ethnic category. This table excludes Latinos from the racial categories and assigns them to a separate category. Hispanics/Latinos may be of any race.
Race / Ethnicity (NH = Non-Hispanic)	Pop 2000	Pop 2010	Pop 2020	% 2000	% 2010	% 2020
White alone (NH)	1,962	1,709	1,453	84.86%	79.97%	68.18%
Black or African American alone (NH)	33	37	56	1.43%	1.73%	2.63%
Native American or Alaska Native alone (NH)	18	12	8	0.78%	0.56%	0.38%
Asian alone (NH)	22	38	48	0.95%	1.78%	2.25%
Native Hawaiian or Pacific Islander alone (NH)	2	3	7	0.09%	0.14%	0.33%
Other race alone (NH)	7	4	11	0.30%	0.19%	0.52%
Mixed race or Multiracial (NH)	65	54	101	2.81%	2.53%	4.74%
Hispanic or Latino (any race)	203	280	447	8.78%	13.10%	20.98%
Total	2,312	2,137	2,131	100.00%	100.00%	100.00%

The 2020 United States census reported that Bethel Island had a population of 2,131. The population density was 405.8 inhabitants per square mile (156.7/km^{2}). The racial makeup of Bethel Island was 72.5% White, 3.0% African American, 2.0% Native American, 2.4% Asian, 0.3% Pacific Islander, 10.4% from other races, and 9.4% from two or more races. Hispanic or Latino of any race were 21.0% of the population.

The Census reported that 98.9% of the population lived in households, 1.1% lived in non-institutionalized group quarters, and no one was institutionalized.

There were 983 households, out of which 17.2% included children under the age of 18, 39.6% were married-couple households, 8.0% were cohabiting couple households, 22.7% had a female householder with no partner present, and 29.7% had a male householder with no partner present. 35.6% of households were one person, and 17.4% were one person aged 65 or older. The average household size was 2.14. There were 546 families (55.5% of all households).

The age distribution was 13.5% under the age of 18, 4.6% aged 18 to 24, 20.0% aged 25 to 44, 35.6% aged 45 to 64, and 26.2% who were 65 years of age or older. The median age was 54.6 years. For every 100 females, there were 106.5 males.

There were 1,244 housing units at an average density of 236.9 units per square mile (91.5 units/km^{2}), of which 983 (79.0%) were occupied. Of these, 79.6% were owner-occupied, and 20.4% were occupied by renters.

== Governance ==
The state created Swamplands Districts #1, 102, 107 and 183 in 1894 to raise money for maintaining the levees in the California Delta. These became part of Reclamation District (RD) 1619, which was created in 1915. The Bethel Island Municipal Improvement District (BIMID) was created from RD 1619 in 1960, and provides some of the same functions as a city government. BIMID currently provides levee maintenance and repairs, habitat mitigation, park services, as well as storm drain maintenance and repair. BIMID has five directors who are elected for four-year terms by registered voters living on Bethel Island.

Residents rely on the Contra Costa Fire Protection District (CCFPD) for fire protection. The Contra Costa County Sheriff's Department provides police services. BIMID is responsible primarily for maintaining the levee around the island. They also have responsibilities for drainage and the park.

BIMID owns 100 acres (40 ha) of land in the center of the island between Bethel Island Road and Piper Road. Appropriately 85 acres (34 ha) is used for sourcing sand to maintain the levee; plus approximately 15 acres (6 ha) used to plant new trees to mitigate for tree removal elsewhere on the island. The BIMID property on Stone Road consists of the District offices, a meeting room and a small equipment yard.

== Amenities ==
The island is mostly below sea level, with a 14.9 mile perimeter levee. The area is home to approximately 3,700 people, with 1,300 residential houses on the island, plus four mobile home parks, 13 commercial marinas, a commercial business area and agricultural land.

== Education ==
The island is served by the Oakley Union Elementary School District and the Liberty Union High School District.

== Parks and recreation ==
Bethel Island Golf Course designed by Bob Baldock, is home to Bethel Island Men's Golf Club, which is affiliated to Northern California Golf Association (NCGA) and offers official USGA handicaps.

== Birding ==
The island lies along the Pacific Flyway within the Sacramento-San Joaquin River Delta. Its tidal wetlands, sloughs, and protected areas, including Hoover Ranch, provide habitat for more than 300 resident and migratory bird species.

== See also ==
- California Delta
- Slough (hydrology)
