= Kilkare Woods, California =

Unincorporated community in California, United States

Kilkare Woods
- Unincorporated community
- Location in California
- Coordinates: 37°37′42″N 121°54′44″W
- Country: United States
- State: California
- Counties: Alameda
- Elevation: 827 ft (252 m)

Population
  - Metro: 773†
- Time zone: UTC−8 (PST)
  - Summer (DST): UTC−7 (PDT)
- ZIP code: 94586
- Area code: 925
- GNIS ID: 1656110
- FIPS code: 06-38464
- †=figure is for zip code

Kilkare Woods, also known as Kilcare Woods, is a small rural unincorporated community of approximately 773 people in southern Alameda County, California, United States, near Pleasanton.

Kilkare Woods began as a private association of summer cottages. The town lies along Sinbad Creek beside Pleasanton Ridge Regional Park, at an elevation of 827 feet (252 meters). The town is only accessible through Sunol by Kilkare Road. Ninety-six % of residents of the ZIP code spoke English as their primary language, while 4% did not. Of those who did not, 3% spoke Hindi and 1% spoke Spanish. Kilkare Woods is served by the CAL FIRE and Livermore-Pleasanton fire departments. Students attend elementary school at Sunol Glen Elementary School in Sunol and high school at Foothill High School in Pleasanton. Law enforcement services are provided by the Alameda County Sheriff's Office.
