= Joe Mixon =

American football player (born 1996)

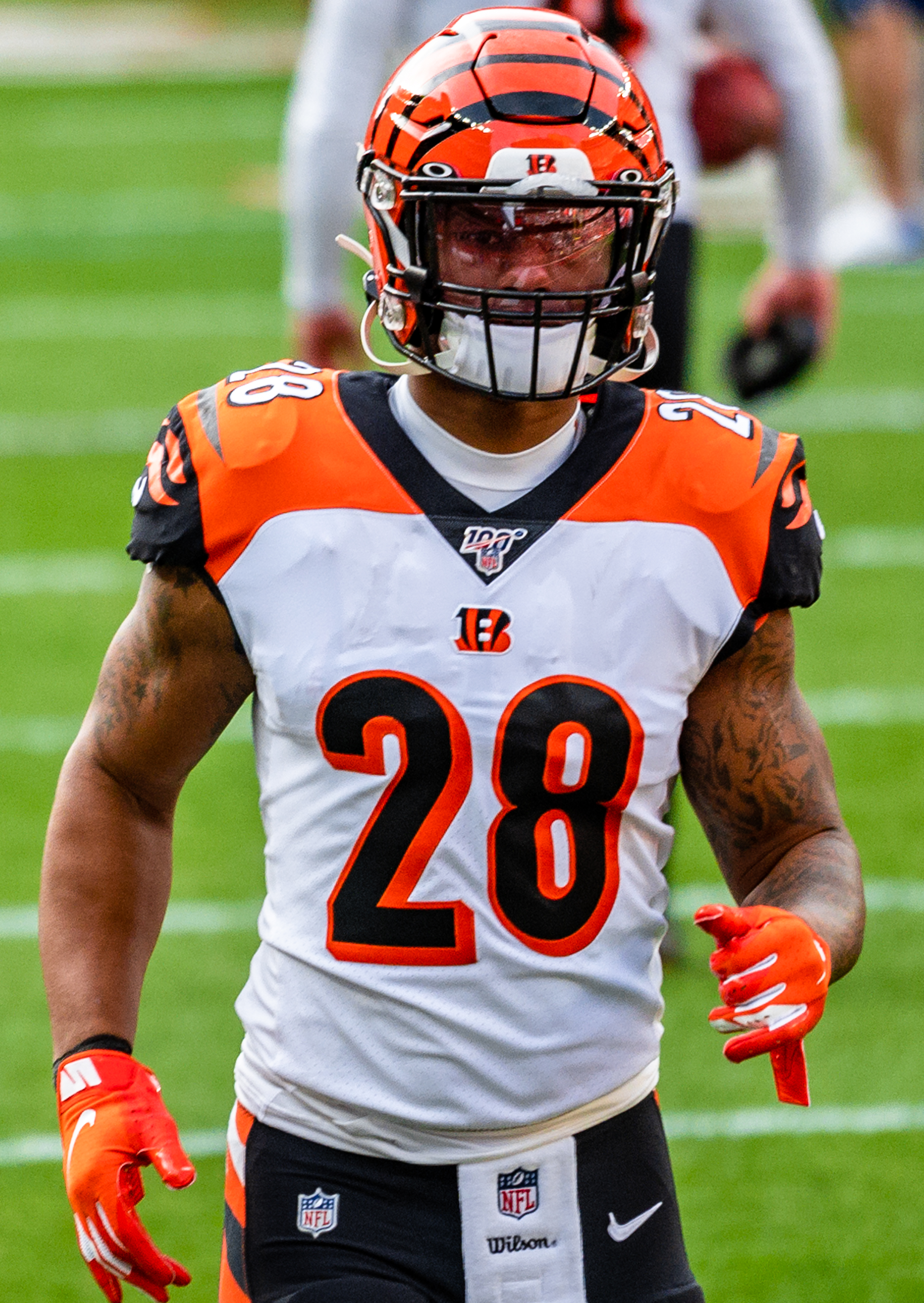
- Mixon with the Cincinnati Bengals in 2019

Profile
- Position: Running back

Personal information
- Born: July 24, 1996 (age 30); Oakley, California, U.S.
- Listed height: 6 ft 1 in (1.85 m)
- Listed weight: 220 lb (100 kg)

Career information
- High school: Freedom (Oakley)
- College: Oklahoma (2014–2016)
- NFL draft: 2017: 2nd round, 48th overall pick

Career history
- Cincinnati Bengals (2017–2023); Houston Texans (2024–2025)

Awards and highlights
- 2× Pro Bowl (2021, 2024); First-team All-Big 12 (2016)

Career NFL statistics as of 2025
- Rushing yards: 7,428
- Rushing average: 4.1
- Rushing touchdowns: 60
- Receptions: 319
- Receiving yards: 2,448
- Receiving touchdowns: 14
- Stats at Pro Football Reference

Joseph Tyler Mixon (born July 24, 1996) is an American professional football running back. He played college football for the Oklahoma Sooners, earning first-team All-Big 12 honors in 2016. He was selected by the Cincinnati Bengals in the second round of the 2017 NFL draft. He has also played for the Houston Texans.

== Early life ==
Mixon attended Freedom High School in Oakley, California, where he played football and basketball for the Falcons. He was a three-year starter at running back for the Freedom High School Falcons football team. He rushed for 1,134 yards and 13 touchdowns as a sophomore on 171 carries. In his junior year, he rushed for 1,443 yards and 21 touchdowns on 201 carries. In his final year, he rushed for 1,704 yards and 23 touchdowns on 226 carries.

Mixon played in 16 basketball games for the Falcons. He had a 12.2 points per game average and a free throw percentage of 57% and made 79 field goals. His team went 22–2 overall and 10–0 in league play that season.

Mixon was ranked as a five-star recruit and the top-ranked running back in the nation by the Rivals.com recruiting network. In January 2014, he committed to the University of Oklahoma to play college football. He had 47 offers, and ultimately chose Oklahoma over Alabama, California, Wisconsin, and UCLA.

== College career ==
Mixon attended and played college football for the University of Oklahoma from 2014 to 2016. He was suspended from the Oklahoma football team for the 2014 season after a misdemeanor assault charge in October 2014.

In 2015, Mixon earned playing time his redshirt freshman year, playing in all 12 games with three starts. In his first career game, Mixon had a 76-yard touchdown reception, the longest catch ever by a Sooner freshman running back. In addition, he ran for 27 yards on five carries against Akron. On October 24, against Texas Tech, he had 154 rushing yards and two rushing touchdowns. In the annual rivalry game against Oklahoma State, he had 136 rushing yards and two rushing touchdowns. Oklahoma qualified for the College Football Playoff in the 2015 season. In the semifinals against Clemson in the Orange Bowl, he was limited to four rushing yards and 11 receiving yards in the loss. During the 2015 regular season, he ran for 749 yards on 110 carries, averaging 6.8 yards. He rushed for seven touchdowns and set his career long carry at 66 yards. He also recorded 25 receptions for 345 yards, averaging 13.8 yards per reception, and four touchdowns.

Mixon started the 2016 season with 40 rushing yards, one rushing touchdown, and 77 receiving yards in a loss to Houston. In the next game against Louisiana–Monroe, he had 117 rushing yards in the 59–17 victory. On October 1, against TCU, he had 105 rushing yards, one rushing touchdown, five receptions, and 70 receiving yards. On October 15, against Kansas State, he had 88 rushing yards, 34 receiving yards, one receiving touchdown, and threw a 26-yard touchdown. On October 22, he had the best statistical performance of his collegiate career with 31 carries for 263 rushing yards and two rushing touchdowns to go along with four receptions for 114 receiving yards and three receiving touchdowns in a 66-59 win over Texas Tech. His career day against Texas Tech marked the first of six consecutive games with at least one rushing touchdown. On November 12, against Baylor, he had 124 rushing yards, one rushing touchdown, five receptions, and 63 receiving yards. He followed that up with 147 rushing yards and a rushing touchdown against West Virginia. On December 3, against Oklahoma State, he had 99 rushing yards, one rushing touchdown, two receptions, 19 receiving yards, and a receiving touchdown. On January 2, he had 91 rushing yards, two rushing touchdowns, five receptions, and 89 receiving yards in the victory over Auburn in the Sugar Bowl.

After the 2016 season, Mixon decided to forgo his remaining two years of eligibility and enter the 2017 NFL draft.

== Professional career ==
=== Pre-draft ===
Coming out of college, some analysts and scouts graded Mixon as a first-round talent but projected him to be selected in the third or fourth round due to his prior history. He was ranked the fifth-best running back by NFLDraftScout.com, the fourth-best by Sports Illustrated, and the third-best back by Pro Football Focus. Although he was a talented prospect, the NFL declined to invite him to the NFL Scouting Combine. ESPN reported that on the weekend of the combine the Cincinnati Bengals met with Mixon in order for them to get a chance to talk with him extensively about his character. On March 8, 2017, Mixon performed all of the combine tests and completed the positional workouts at Oklahoma's Pro Day.

Pre-draft measurables
Height	Weight	Arm length	Hand span	Wingspan	40-yard dash	10-yard split	20-yard split	20-yard shuttle	Three-cone drill	Vertical jump	Broad jump	Bench press	Wonderlic
6 ft 0 3/4 in (1.85 m)	228 lb (103 kg)	30 1/8 in (0.77 m)	10 1/4 in (0.26 m)	6 ft 2 1/2 in (1.89 m)	4.45 s	1.51 s	2.62 s	4.27 s	7.10 s	35.0 in (0.89 m)	9 ft 10 in (3.00 m)	21 reps	12
All values from Oklahoma's Pro Day

=== Cincinnati Bengals ===
==== 2017 ====
Mixon was selected by the Bengals in the second round (48th overall) of the 2017 NFL Draft. He was the fourth running back to be selected in that year's draft. He was viewed as a first-round talent by some scouts, but several teams removed him from their draft board entirely due to character concerns after a prior assault on Amelia Molitor, a female student at Oklahoma. New England Patriots owner Robert Kraft said, "While I believe in second chances and giving players an opportunity for redemption, I also believe that playing in the NFL is a privilege, not a right. For me, personally, I believe that privilege is lost for men who have a history of abusing women." After Mixon was drafted, ESPN writer Dan Graziano wrote that, "No 2017 draft pick enters the league under more intense scrutiny or controversy." The editorial board of Cincinnati TV station WCPO criticized the draft pick and called for a boycott of the Bengals, writing, "Instead of buying a Bengals ticket this year, take the $50 or more you would have spent on that ticket and donate the money to a nonprofit that works to prevent violence against women." On June 2, 2017, the Bengals signed Mixon to a four-year, $5.45 million contract with $2.81 million guaranteed and a signing bonus of $2.10 million.

On September 10, 2017, Mixon made his NFL debut in a 20–0 loss to the Baltimore Ravens. He had eight rushes for nine yards and three receptions for 15 yards. In Week 3, against the Green Bay Packers, his role in the offense expanded with 18 carries for 62 yards. In Week 5, against the Buffalo Bills, he recorded his first career rushing touchdown, a five-yard rush in the fourth quarter. In Week 8, against the Indianapolis Colts, he recorded over 100 scrimmage yards (18 rushing and 91 receiving) for the first time in his career, 67 of them coming on a long run-after-catch play in the second quarter. After three disappointing weeks of 31 rushing yards against the Jacksonville Jaguars, 37 rushing yards against the Tennessee Titans, and 49 rushing yards against the Denver Broncos, averaging just 2.79 yards per carry over the time span but recording two touchdowns, Mixon led the NFL in Week 12 with a career-best 114 rushing yards against the Cleveland Browns, along with a touchdown and 51 yards receiving. Mixon closed out his rookie season with 96 rushing yards against the Ravens in the 31–27 victory. Overall, in his rookie season, Mixon finished with 626 rushing yards, 4 rushing touchdowns, 30 receptions, and 287 receiving yards.

==== 2018 ====
In the 2018 season opener against the Colts, Mixon started the season off with 95 rushing yards, a rushing touchdown, and five receptions for 54 yards in the 34–23 victory. In the next game against the Ravens, Mixon had to leave the game multiple times due to a knee injury. He returned to action in Week 5 against the Miami Dolphins with 93 rushing yards, 22 receiving yards, and a receiving touchdown in the 27–17 victory. In Week 8, against the Tampa Bay Buccaneers, he had 123 rushing yards and two rushing touchdowns in the 37–34 victory for his second-career multi-touchdown game. On December 9, Mixon racked up 111 yards and a score on the ground against the Los Angeles Chargers. In Week 15 against the Oakland Raiders, Mixon rushed for 129 yards and two touchdowns in a 30–16 win. This was the third multi-touchdown game of Mixon's career. He finished the season leading the AFC in rushing yards with 1,168. In addition, he had eight rushing touchdowns and one receiving touchdown.

==== 2019 ====
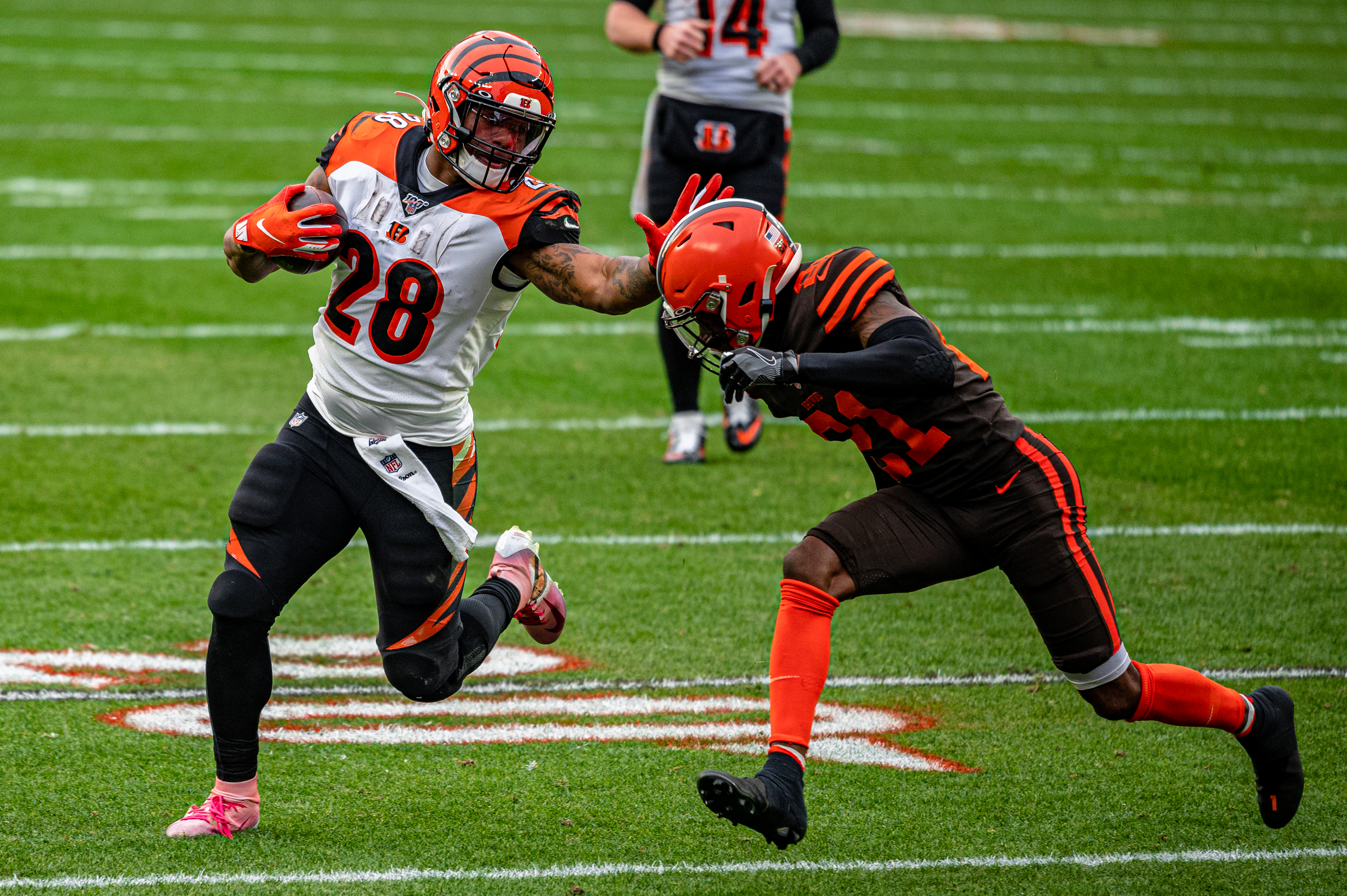
Mixon playing against the Cleveland Browns in 2019

In Week 3 against the Bills, Mixon rushed 15 times for 61 yards and caught two passes for 34 yards and a touchdown as the Bengals lost 21–17. In Week 10 against the Ravens, Mixon rushed a season high 30 times for 114 yards in the 49–13 loss. In Week 11 against the Raiders, Mixon rushed 15 times for 86 yards and his first rushing touchdown of the season in the 17–10 loss. In Week 14 against the Browns, Mixon finished the game with 23 rushes for 146 yards and a touchdown and three catches for 40 yards as the Bengals lost 27–19. During Week 15 against the Patriots, Mixon finished with 25 rush attempts for 136 rushing yards as the Bengals lost 34–13. In Week 17 against the Browns, Mixon rushed 26 times for 162 yards and two touchdowns during the 33–23 win. In the 2019 season, Mixon finished with 1,137 rushing yards and five rushing touchdowns to go along with 35 receptions for 287 receiving yards and three receiving touchdowns.

==== 2020 ====
On September 1, 2020, Mixon signed a four-year, $48 million contract extension with the Bengals through the 2024 season. In Week 4, against the Jaguars, Mixon had 25 carries for 151 rushing yards and two rushing touchdowns to go along with six receptions for 30 receiving yards and one receiving touchdown during the 33–25 win. Mixon was named the AFC Offensive Player of the Week for his performance in Week 4. In Week 6, he suffered a foot injury and missed the next three games before being placed on injured reserve on November 21, 2020. In the 2020 season, Mixon finished with 428 rushing yards and three rushing touchdowns to go along with 21 receptions for 138 receiving yards and a receiving touchdown in six games.

==== 2021 ====
During Week 1 against the Minnesota Vikings, Mixon finished with 127 rushing yards and a touchdown as the Bengals won 27–24 in overtime. In Week 11, against the Las Vegas Raiders, he had 121 rushing yards and two touchdowns. In Week 12, Mixon had 165 rushing yards and two touchdowns in a 41–10 win over the Pittsburgh Steelers, earning AFC Offensive Player of the Week. In December, Mixon was selected to his first Pro Bowl, making him the first Bengals running back to make the Pro Bowl since Rudi Johnson in 2004. On January 5, 2022, Mixon was revealed to have tested positive for COVID-19, and thus could not play in the season finale. Overall, Mixon finished the 2021 season with a career high 1,205 rushing yards and 13 rushing touchdowns to go along with 42 receptions for 314 receiving yards and 3 receiving touchdowns. Mixon's 13 rushing touchdowns were the most by a Bengals player since Ickey Woods had 15 in the 1988 season.

In Super Bowl LVI, Mixon rushed for 72 yards, and threw his first career pass attempt, a 6-yard passing touchdown to Tee Higgins in the 23–20 loss to the Los Angeles Rams. He was the third running back in NFL history to throw a touchdown in the Super Bowl. He was ranked 38th by his fellow players on the NFL Top 100 Players of 2022.

==== 2022 ====
In the Bengals' season-opener, Mixon had 145 scrimmage yards in the 23–20 overtime loss to the Steelers. In Week 9 against the Carolina Panthers, Mixon rushed for 153 yards, had 58 receiving yards, and a career-high, franchise record, five touchdowns in the 42–21 win. He was named AFC Offensive Player of the Week for his game against the Panthers. In the 2022 season, Mixon finished with 210 carries for 814 rushing yards and seven rushing touchdowns to go along with 60 receptions for 441 receiving yards and two receiving touchdowns in 14 games and starts. In the Divisional Round against the Bills, he had 20 carries for 105 yards and a touchdown in the 27–10 victory.

==== 2023 ====
Mixon began the season by restructuring his contract to a more team-friendly, incentive based deal. He scored his first touchdown of the season in Week 3 against the Los Angeles Rams, and had his first combined 100-yard game in Week 8 against the San Francisco 49ers. He would have a two-touchdown game against the Jacksonville Jaguars in Week 13, and had his first and only 100-yard rushing game of the season against the Cleveland Browns in Week 18. Mixon finished the 2023 season with 1,034 rushing yards and 12 combined touchdowns. He moved into third place for the Bengals' franchise rushing leader, behind James Brooks and Corey Dillon. He was selected as a first alternate to the Pro Bowl.

=== Houston Texans ===
Mixon was traded to the Houston Texans on March 13, 2024, in exchange for a 2024 seventh round selection previously obtained from the Arizona Cardinals, which the Bengals used to select safety Daijahn Anthony. The next day, he signed a three-year, $27 million contract extension through the 2026 season. In his Texans debut against the Colts on September 8, Mixon recorded his third-highest career rushing output in a single game as he finished with 159 yards with a touchdown in a 29–27 win, earning AFC Offensive Player of the Week. He missed three games from Week 3 to Week 5 with an ankle injury. In his return in Week 6, he had 132 scrimmage yards, a rushing touchdown, and a receiving touchdown in the 41–21 win over the Patriots. In the following game against the Packers, he had 25 carries for 115 yards and two touchdowns in the 24–22 loss. In the following three games, he scored a touchdown in each game and went over 100 rushing yards in two of them. In Week 11 against the Cowboys, he had 20 carries for 109 yards and three touchdowns in the 34–10 win. In Week 13 against the Jaguars, he became the only player in NFL history to have at least 100 rushing yards and a rushing touchdown in six consecutive road games. He finished the 2024 season with 245 carries for 1,016 rushing yards and 11 rushing touchdowns to go with 36 receptions for 309 receiving yards and one receiving touchdown. In the Wild Card Round of the playoffs, he had 25 carries for 106 rushing yards and one rushing touchdown in the 32–12 win over the Chargers. He had 100 scrimmage yards and a rushing touchdown in the 23–14 loss to the Chiefs in the Divisional Round.

Mixon missed the entirety of the 2025 season with a foot injury. On March 6, 2026, Mixon was released by the Texans.

== Career statistics ==
=== NFL ===
Legend
**Bold**	Career high

==== Regular season ====
Year	Team	Games		Rushing					Receiving					Fumbles	
Year	Team	GP	GS	Att	Yds	Avg	Lng	TD	Rec	Yds	Avg	Lng	TD	Fum	Lost
2017	CIN	14	7	178	626	3.5	25	4	30	287	**9.6**	**67**	0	**3**	**2**
2018	CIN	14	13	237	1,168	**4.9**	51	8	43	296	6.9	21	1	0	0
2019	CIN	16	15	278	1,137	4.1	41	5	35	287	8.2	33	**3**	0	0
2020	CIN	6	6	119	428	3.6	34	3	21	138	6.6	19	1	1	1
2021	CIN	16	16	**292**	**1,205**	4.1	32	**13**	42	314	7.5	52	**3**	2	1
2022	CIN	14	14	210	814	3.9	40	7	**60**	**441**	7.4	35	2	0	0
2023	CIN	17	17	257	1,034	4.0	44	9	52	376	7.2	45	**3**	0	0
2024	HOU	14	14	245	1,016	4.1	**59**	11	36	309	8.6	37	1	0	0
2025	HOU	0	0	Did not play due to injury											
Career		111	102	1,816	7,428	4.1	59	60	319	2,448	7.7	67	14	6	4

==== Postseason ====
Year	Team	Games		Rushing					Receiving					Fumbles	
Year	Team	GP	GS	Att	Yds	Avg	Lng	TD	Rec	Yds	Avg	Lng	TD	Fum	Lost
2021	CIN	4	4	**67**	**262**	3.9	**23**	1	**18**	**107**	5.9	**21**	0	0	0
2022	CIN	3	3	39	163	4.2	16	1	8	50	6.3	13	0	0	0
2024	HOU	2	2	43	194	**4.5**	17	**2**	3	25	**8.3**	13	0	**1**	**1**
2025	HOU	0	0	Did not play due to injury											
Career		9	9	149	619	4.2	23	4	29	182	6.3	21	0	1	1

=== College ===
Season	Team	Games		Rushing				Receiving			
Season	Team	GP	GS	Att	Yds	Avg	TD	Rec	Yds	Avg	TD
2015	Oklahoma	13	4	113	753	6.7	7	28	356	12.7	4
2016	Oklahoma	12	5	187	1,274	6.8	10	37	538	14.5	5
Total		25	9	300	2,027	6.8	17	65	894	13.8	9

== Legal issues ==
=== 2014 misdemeanor assault charge ===
Mixon entered an Alford plea to a misdemeanor assault charge in October 2014 for punching Amelia Molitor, breaking bones in her face and resulting in hospitalization and surgery. The incident happened on July 25, 2014, in Norman, Oklahoma.

Some of his teammates were harassing Molitor and her friend outside a store. The surveillance video shows Mixon follow Molitor inside the store and the two begin arguing, followed by Molitor pushing and slapping Mixon's face, and then Mixon punching Molitor, causing her to fall into a table. Molitor required surgery after the incident, as the punch and resulting fall had broken four bones in her face. According to Molitor, the incident was escalated when Mixon used a homophobic slur towards her friend after Mixon followed them into the store. Mixon claimed that Molitor's friend had directed a racial slur at him and that he responded with a homophobic slur at the friend.

Mixon received a one-year deferred sentence and was ordered to undergo counseling along with 100 hours of community service. Molitor filed suit in federal court against Mixon on July 22, 2016, accusing Mixon of negligence, wilful and wanton misconduct, and intentional infliction of emotional distress. A settlement in the case was reached, and Mixon apologized to Molitor on April 21, 2017.

=== 2023 alleged aggravated menacing incident ===
A warrant was issued for Mixon's arrest for one count of Aggravated Menacing on February 2, 2023. It was alleged that Mixon pointed a gun at a woman in downtown Cincinnati, according to local reports. Mixon allegedly said: "You should be popped in the face. I should shoot you now. The police can't get me." The alleged incident was said to have happened one day before the Bengals faced the Buffalo Bills in the AFC Divisional playoff game. On February 3, 2023, less than 24 hours after the warrant was issued the aggravated menacing charge against Mixon was dismissed, per the request of The Hamilton County Prosecutor's Office. According to WCPO-TV, a prosecutor told county judge Curt Kissinger, "We need additional investigation before we would move forward with this case." Authorities reserved the right to refile the charge at a later date if needed. On April 7, 2023, the Cincinnati Police Department publicly announced the criminal charge against Mixon had been refiled. On August 17, 2023, Mixon was found not guilty and acquitted of the charges following a four-day trial in Hamilton County Municipal Court.

=== 2023 injured child incident ===
On March 6, 2023, the Hamilton County sheriff department responded to a "shots fired" call at Mixon's home. An injured child was found on the scene and transported to Cincinnati Children's Hospital Medical Center with non-life-threatening injuries. On March 16, 2023, Hamilton County prosecutors charged Mixon's sister and her boyfriend in the case. However, Mixon was not charged as the prosecutor said, "He did not commit a crime."

== Personal life ==
Mixon is a Christian. He often credits God for his football ability.

In an interview with Malik Wright filmed in 2025, Mixon described himself as low key and a man who prefers to spend a lot of time at home and with family.

Mixon has a daughter who was born in October 2023 according to Bengals coach Zac Taylor. He has been described as having tight relationships with his offensive lines (on both the Texans and Bengals).
