= Heritage High School (Brentwood, California) =

- The Heritage High School Rotunda

Location
- 101 American Avenue; Brentwood, California 94513; United States; 37.92128°N 121.75469°W

Information
- Type: Public
- Motto: "Home of the Patriots"
- Established: 2005
- School district: Liberty Union High School District
- Principal: Casey Lewis
- Teaching staff: 115.95 (FTE)
- Grades: 9–12
- Enrollment: 2,566 (2024-2025)
- Student to teacher ratio: 22.13
- Colors: Columbia blue, gold and white
- Athletics conference: Bay Valley Athletic League (BVAL)
- Mascot: Patriot
- Team name: Patriots
- Newspaper: Heritage Star Ledger
- Website: Heritage High School Website

Heritage High School is a public high school in Brentwood, California, United States. It opened on August 1, 2005, with a freshman and sophomore class.

== Overview ==
The school features include a state-of-the-art theatre, recording studio, broadcast studio (with green screen), and large rear projection screen TVs in every classroom. Its colors are gold, Columbia blue, and white, and its mascot is the Patriot. It was recently credited with the six-year status highest API score in the district.

== History ==
In 2003, bids were taken for the construction of the school.

The school grew every year until it reached the capacity of all four classes (freshman, sophomore, junior, and senior) in 2008. The Heritage High School class of 2008 was the highest grade each year it was at Heritage, and was its first graduating class.

In 2012, the school became the first school in the district to ban the use of social media in school campaigns due to adverse social effects. In 2012, more than 50 students were suspended for a prank involving a lamb and washable paint.

In 2013, a large number of students and spectators required medical treatment due to extreme heat at the graduation ceremony.

In 2014, the school created an innovative program combining art and technology.

In January 2026, many students participated in a walkout protesting the actions of ICE and the Trump Administration.

== SLCs ==
The school is separated into four Small Learning Communities (SLCs): SLC-A, SLC-B, SLC-C, and SLC-D. SLC-A is further divided into SLC-A1 and SLC-A2. Each SLC is staffed with an assistant principal, counselor, and secretary. All students are assigned to an SLC once enrolled, and they remain in the same SLC until graduation.

SLC-A and SLC-D were the only SLCs open the first year of school, but the second school year saw the beginning of SLC-B, with SLC-C being partially used for PE teachers, and by 2007 it was being used completely. The Class of 2008 was the first class to graduate from Heritage High School, and the Class of 2009 was the first to have attended Heritage for all four years.

As of 2019, all four SLCs are being used and have been staffed with assistant principals.

== Academics ==
Heritage High offers 21 Advanced Placement courses as of 2026. The school has a graduation rate of 96% according to GreatSchools.

The school also offers four Career Academies: Health, Technology, Arts and Entrepreneurial, and Public Service. Each academy contains multiple career pathways that students can complete by taking certain courses as required by the pathway. Students who successfully complete a pathway are recognized at graduation.

Heritage participates in the Contra Costa County Regional Occupation Program (ROP). This program allows students to earn community college credits by taking classes on-campus that are taught by certified high school teachers.

Students may enroll in Dual-Enrollment and Concurrent-Enrollment classes while at Heritage. These classes allow students to take community college classes as a high school student.

== Athletics ==
The school is home to sports teams called the Patriots. It is part of the Bay Valley Athletic League (BVAL). The Patriots compete in various sports including football, basketball, soccer, baseball, softball, track and field, cross country, swim and dive, water polo, wrestling, golf, tennis, volleyball, and competitive and stunt cheer. Numerous sports also compete in the North Coast Section Championships. In 2023, the school inaugurated girls' flag football.

== Extracurriculars ==
The school offers a wide range of extracurricular programs and clubs to enhance students' experience and learning, including, but not limited to:

=== Visual & performing arts ===
- Instrumental Music Program
- Choir Program
- Rising Stars Theater Program
- Video Productions Program

=== Competitive clubs/Programs ===
- Dance Team
- Future Business Leaders of America
- Health Occupations Students of America
- Mock Trials
- Model UN
- Robotics
- Science Olympiad
- Speech & Debate
- STEAM Racing

=== Cultural clubs ===
The school features a variety of cultural, ethnic, and religious clubs that foster a diverse and inclusive community, allowing students to explore their identities, celebrate their traditions, and build connections with peers from similar or different backgrounds.

=== Other Clubs ===
The school features dozens of other clubs in various fields including volunteering, sports, photography and journalism, music, STEM, literature, environment, and more.

== Notable alumni ==
- Paul Blackburn (2012), MLB All-Star pitcher
