= Marsh Creek Springs, California =

Marsh Creek Springs
- Private recreational facility
- Location in California
- Coordinates: 37°53′34″N 121°51′14″W
- Country: United States
- State: California
- County: Contra Costa County
- Elevation: 584 ft (178 m)
- GNIS ID: 1659067
- FIPS code: 06-46080

Marsh Creek Springs was a private recreational facility in Contra Costa County, California. It was developed in 1927 by Gerald L. Gill on 90 acres alongside Marsh Creek. The facility included two swimming pools, wading pools, a livery stable, a dance hall and four baseball diamonds. By 1940 it had grown to cover 210 acres and was able to host 5,000 guests and 1,200 automobiles arriving from all over the Bay Area. In 1957 a flash flood sent a twelve-foot crest of water down Marsh Creek and destroyed the park. It was re-opened that same year but a second flood in 1962 again destroyed the park and it remained closed.
