= Byron Airport =

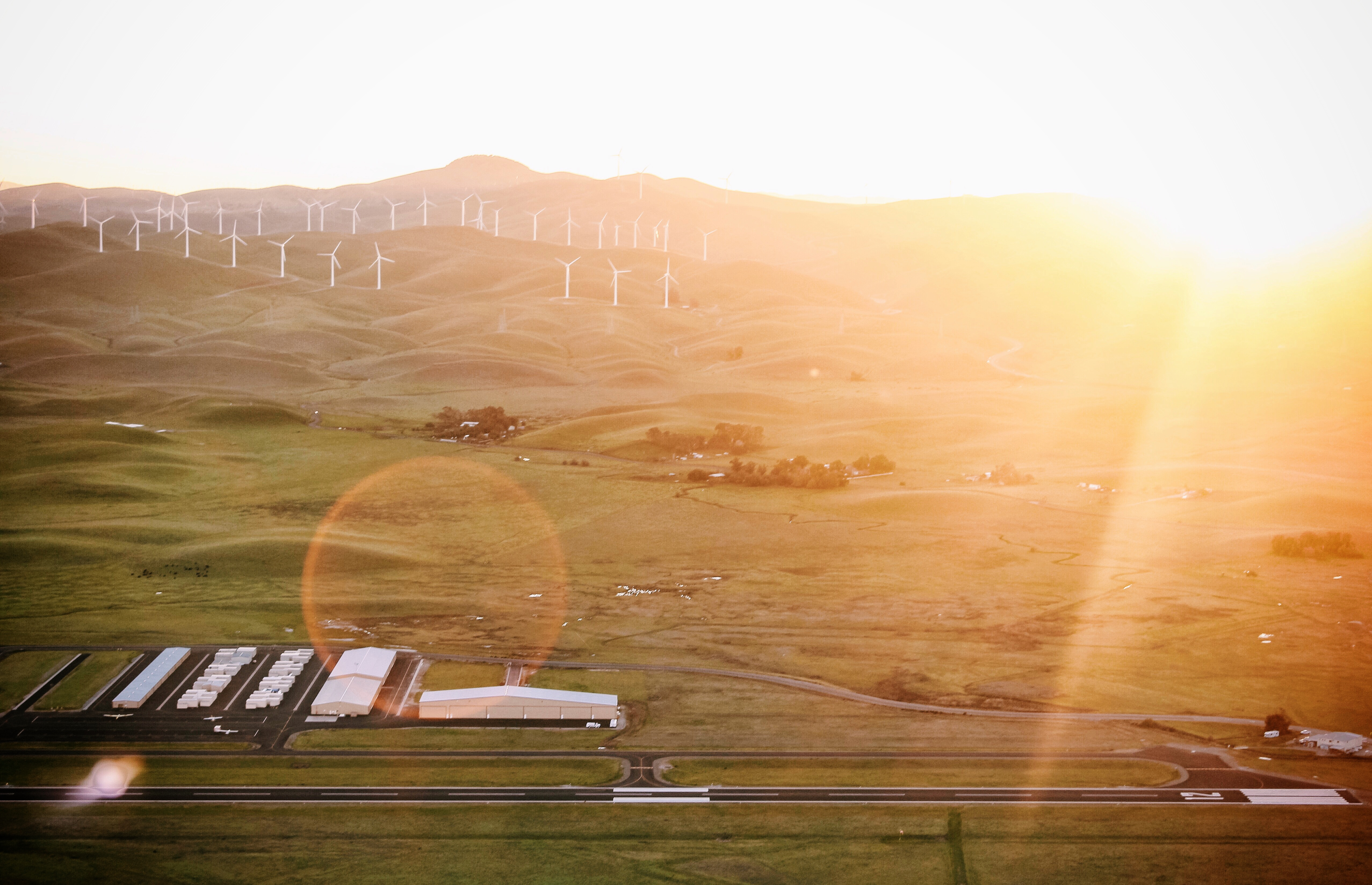
- Byron Airport in 2017
- IATA: none; ICAO: none; FAA LID: C83

Summary
- Airport type: Public
- Owner: Contra Costa County
- Location: Byron, California
- Opened: 1994
- Elevation AMSL: 79 ft (24 m)
- Coordinates: 37°49′42″N 121°37′33″W

Map
- Location within California

Runways
Direction	Length		Surface
Direction	ft	m	Surface
12/30	4,500	1,372	Asphalt
5/23	3,000	914	Asphalt

Statistics (2021)
- Aircraft operations: 83,075
- Based aircraft: 84
- Source: Federal Aviation Administration

Byron Airport (FAA LID: C83) is a public airport two miles south of Byron, in Contra Costa County, California, United States. The FAA's National Plan of Integrated Airport Systems for 2007–2011 categorized it as a reliever airport.

== About ==
On the lee side of the Diablo Range mountains, Byron experiences 10-30 knot winds and thermals. Local student pilots often use Byron to practice crosswind landings.

Uncontrolled and relatively isolated, Byron supports organizations for skydiving and soaring. For skydiving, the popular drop zone is on the north end of the airport and serviced by Bay Area Skydiving. For soaring, the Northern California Soaring Association offers instructions on weekends in flying gliders.

All pilots should be mindful of the variable wind and thermals, rising terrain, and traffic without radios.

== Facilities ==
Byron Airport covers 1,421 acres (575 ha) and has two asphalt runways: 12/30 is 4,500 x 100 ft (1,372 x 30 m) and 5/23 is 3,000 x 75 ft (914 x 23 m).

In the year ending December 31, 2021, the airport had 83,075 aircraft operations, average 227 per day: 100% general aviation and <1% military. 84 aircraft were then based at this airport: 66 single-engine, 12 glider, 4 multi-engine, 1 helicopter, and 1 ultralight.

== See also ==
- List of airports in the San Francisco Bay Area
