= Byron, California =

Byron
- Unincorporated Community; Census Designated Place
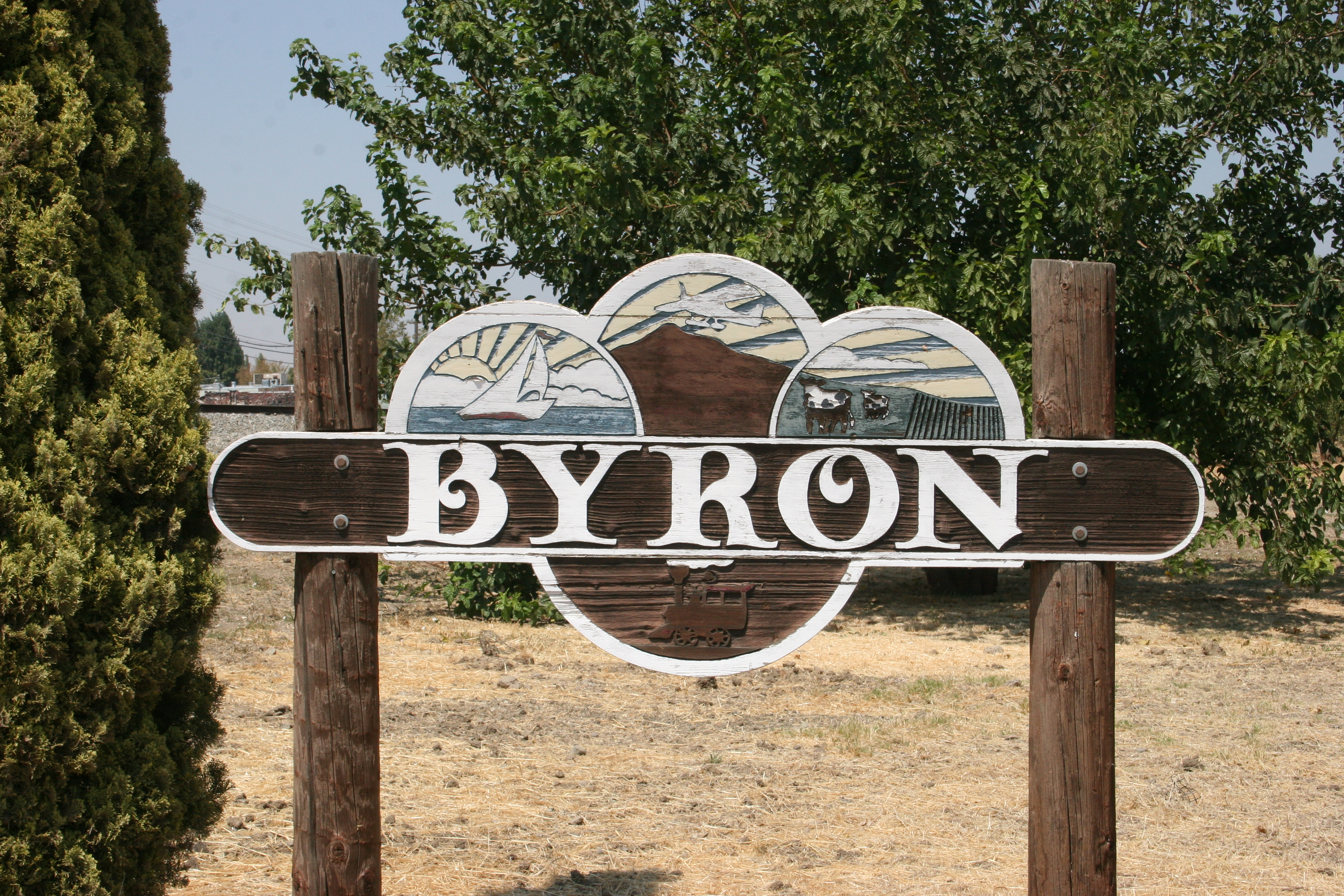
- Byron sign

- Location in Contra Costa County and the state of California

- Location in the United States
- Coordinates: 37°52′02″N 121°38′17″W
- Country: United States
- State: California
- County: Contra Costa

Government
  - State senator: Christopher Cabaldon (D)
  - Assemblymember: Lori Wilson (D)
  - U. S. rep.: Josh Harder (D)

Area
  - Total: 6.52 sq mi (16.89 km^{2})
  - Land: 6.52 sq mi (16.89 km^{2})
  - Water: 0 sq mi (0.00 km^{2}) 0%
- Elevation: 33 ft (10 m)

Population (2020)
  - Total: 1,140
  - Density: 175/sq mi (67.5/km^{2})
- Time zone: UTC-8 (Pacific)
  - Summer (DST): UTC-7 (PDT)
- ZIP code: 94514
- Area code: 925
- FIPS code: 06-09346
- GNIS feature IDs: 238290, 2407934

Byron is a census designated place (CDP) in Contra Costa County, California, United States. As of the 2020 census, Byron had a population of 1,140.

== History ==
Byron's location was part of a land grant that Jose Noriega received from the King of Spain in 1835. Noriega then sold 17,000 acres to John Marsh for the equivalent of $500 (three U.S. cents per acre). In 1841, the Bidwell-Bartelson wagon train arrived at Marsh's ranch with the earliest Anglo settlers from the east.

Byron's first post office opened in 1878. Byron is named after an employee of the San Pablo, and the eastern U. S. and Pacific Railroad. (Note: Later acquired by the Southern Pacific Railroad)

In 1942, all of the town's residents of Japanese descent were forcibly removed by the US government with pressure from California agricultural interests and taken to Turlock assembly center.

In 1960, Contra Costa County built the Orin Allen Youth Rehabilitation Center, better known informally as the Boys' Ranch on a 50 acres (200,000 m^{2}) tract immediately southeast of Byron. The Boys' Ranch is a minimum-security facility that houses up to 100 youthful offenders. The property has no security fence to contain residents within the perimeter and includes dormitories, classrooms, a kitchen and dining facility, athletic facilities and administrative offices which occupy about one-third of the area. Its objective was stated as rehabilitation, rather than simply detention.

In 2008, a Contra Costa County Grand Jury began an investigation into whether the facility was cost-effective, or whether it should be permanently closed. It began by conducting an unannounced site inspection in September, 2008. In 2009, it released its report to the county commissioners. The report identified 21 defects at the facility that needed correction.

== Geography ==
According to the United States Census Bureau, the CDP has a total area of 6.5 square miles (17 km^{2}), all land. It is located 5.5 miles (9 km) southeast of Brentwood.

=== Climate ===
This region experiences hot and dry summers, with average monthly high temperatures varying from 55 degrees in January to 93 degrees in July. Byron is windy, and dust devils sometimes appear. According to the Köppen Climate Classification system, Byron has a warm-summer Mediterranean climate, abbreviated "Csb" on climate maps.

=== Gallery ===
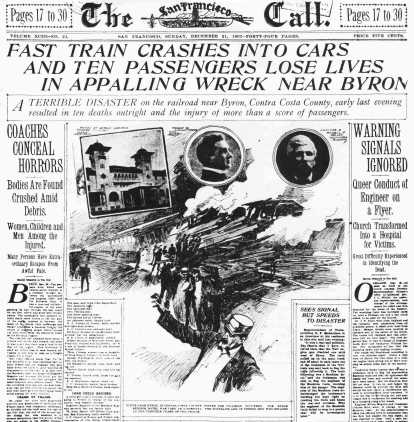
The San Francisco Call reporting the Byron Train Disaster, December 1902

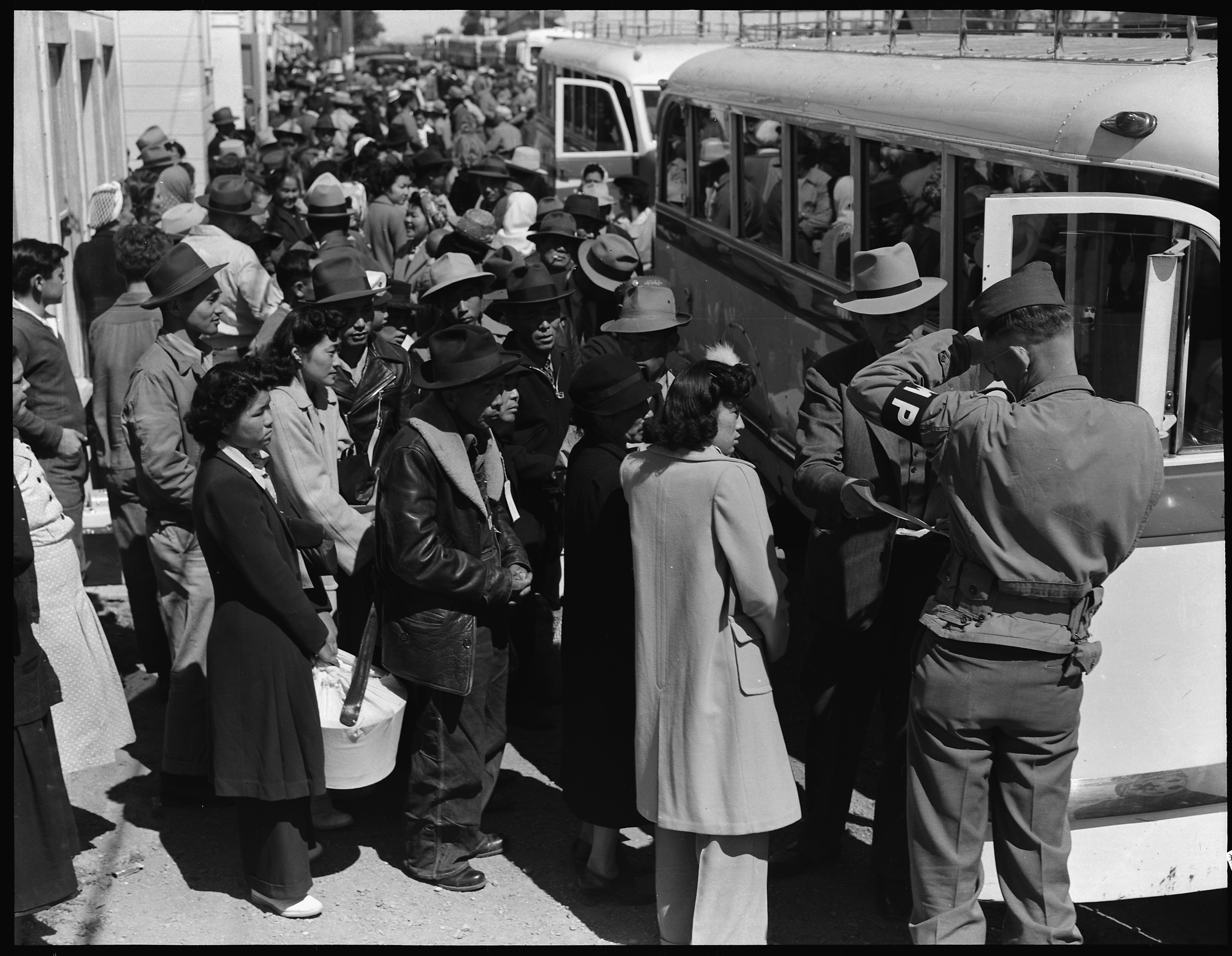
Families of Japanese ancestry being removed from Byron during World War II

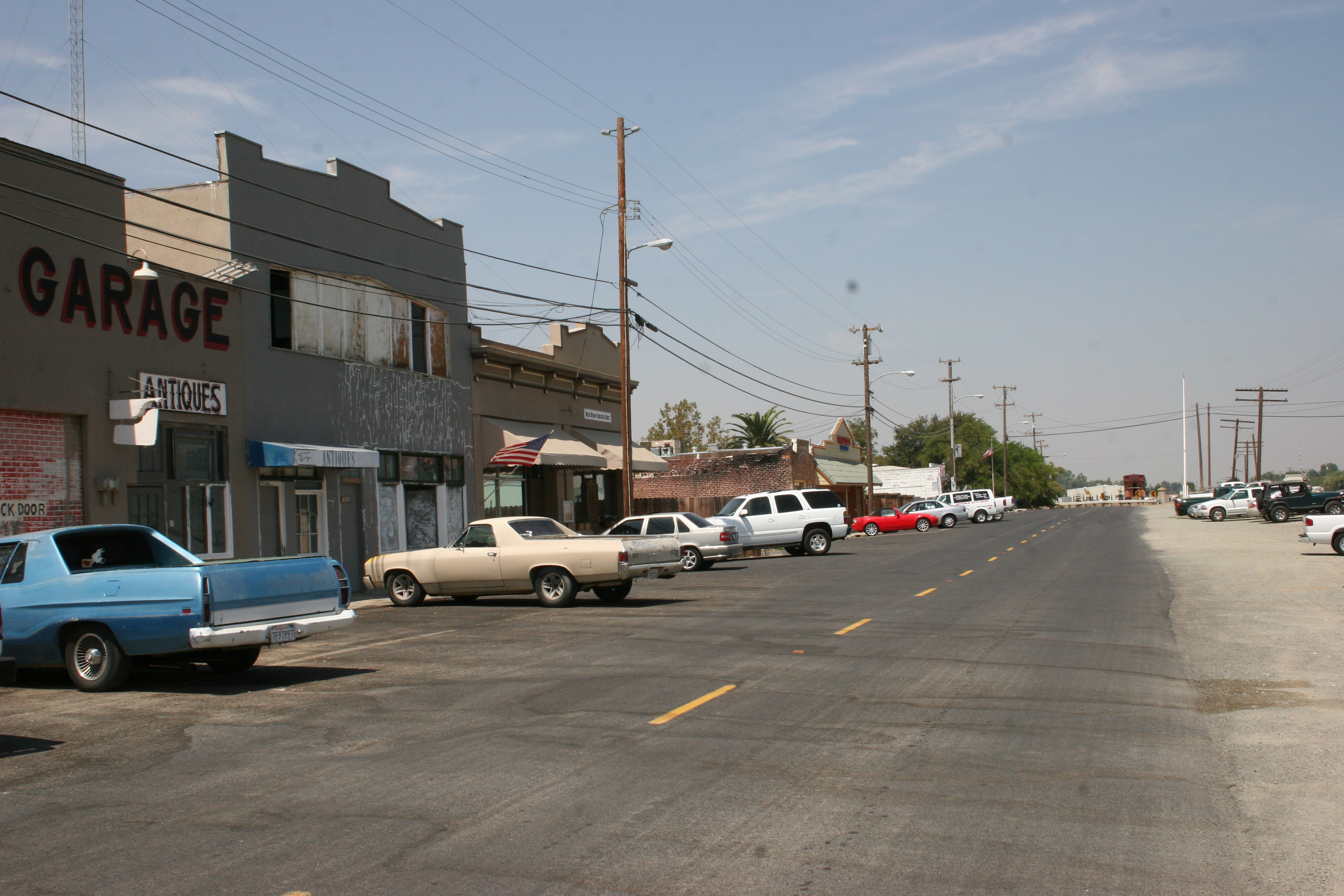
Main Street, Byron, California 2008

== Demographics ==
Historical population
Census	Pop.	Note	%±
2000	916		—
2010	1,277		39.4%
2020	1,140		−10.7%
U.S. Decennial Census; 1850–1870 1880-1890; 1900 1910 1920; 1930 1940 1950; 1960 1970 1980; 1990 2000 2010

Byron first appeared as a census designated place in the 2000 U.S. census.

=== Racial and ethnic composition ===
Byron CDP, California – Racial and ethnic composition Note: the US Census treats Hispanic/Latino as an ethnic category. This table excludes Latinos from the racial categories and assigns them to a separate category. Hispanics/Latinos may be of any race.
Race / Ethnicity (NH = Non-Hispanic)	Pop 2000	Pop 2010	Pop 2020	% 2000	% 2010	% 2020
White alone (NH)	589	666	509	64.30%	52.15%	44.65%
Black or African American alone (NH)	40	59	24	4.37%	4.62%	2.11%
Native American or Alaska Native alone (NH)	10	4	8	1.09%	0.31%	0.70%
Asian alone (NH)	20	4	5	2.18%	0.31%	0.44%
Native Hawaiian or Pacific Islander alone (NH)	2	10	3	0.22%	0.78%	0.26%
Other race alone (NH)	0	0	0	0.00%	0.00%	0.00%
Mixed race or Multiracial (NH)	18	31	15	1.97%	2.43%	1.32%
Hispanic or Latino (any race)	237	503	576	25.87%	39.39%	50.53%
Total	916	1,277	1,140	100.00%	100.00%	100.00%

=== 2020 census ===
As of the 2020 census, Byron had a population of 1,140 and a population density of 174.8 inhabitants per square mile (67.5/km^{2}).

The Census reported that 98.5% of the population lived in households, no one lived in non-institutionalized group quarters, and 1.5% were institutionalized.

The age distribution was 22.9% under the age of 18, 8.7% aged 18 to 24, 24.2% aged 25 to 44, 29.6% aged 45 to 64, and 14.6% who were 65 years of age or older. The median age was 39.4 years. For every 100 females, there were 110.7 males, and for every 100 females age 18 and over there were 106.8 males age 18 and over.

55.7% of residents lived in urban areas, while 44.3% lived in rural areas.

There were 374 households, out of which 34.2% included children under the age of 18, 55.6% were married-couple households, 5.6% were cohabiting couple households, 21.1% had a female householder with no partner present, and 17.6% had a male householder with no partner present. 17.9% of households were one person, and 7.2% were one person aged 65 or older. The average household size was 3.0. There were 285 families (76.2% of all households).

There were 377 housing units at an average density of 57.8 units per square mile (22.3 units/km^{2}), of which 374 (99.2%) were occupied. Of these, 66.6% were owner-occupied, and 33.4% were occupied by renters. 0.8% of housing units were vacant. The homeowner vacancy rate was 0.0% and the rental vacancy rate was 0.0%.

== Education ==
All of Byron is in the Byron Union School District. All of it is also in Liberty Union High School District. There are only one 6–8 school in the Byron district, Excelsior Middle School. Discovery Bay Elementary and Timber Point Elementary is located in Discovery Bay and is the district's K–5 schools.

== Former resort ==
Byron, California is also home to the somewhat well-known and historical Byron Hot Springs, a now-abandoned resort that was a retreat that attracted many movie stars and famous athletes in the early 1900s. The first hotel was built around 57 hot springs and owned by Lewis Mead in 1889. The hotel included a three-story wood building, with a few cottages scattered nearby, as well as a laundry, gas plant and ice plant, all of which were destroyed by fire on July 25, 1901. A second hotel, also three stories, but made of stucco was constructed 1901–1902, but it burned on July 18, 1912. The third and final hotel, a four-story brick structure was built in 1913, reopened in 1914.

In 1938 the resort closed, after a series of lawsuits that were probably brought about by the Great Depression, but was leased by the government in 1941 and became a military interrogation camp housing both German and Japanese prisoners of war, known as Camp Tracy, until 1945, when orders were sent to dismantle it.

In 1947 Byron Hot Springs was put up for sale and purchased by the Greek Orthodox Church for $105,000. It served as Monastery St. Paul for several years. It then changed hands several times as a resort, country club, and private residence. In 2008, a developer announced plans to restore the resort. As of 2021 a Byron Hot Springs website retains a "Resort Plans" page for the restoration of Byron Hot Springs.

In 2005, a Victorian-era carriage house on the property was burned to the ground. The hotel itself sustained some fire damage, but still stands.

Byron Hot Springs is 1.5 miles (2.4 km) south-southeast of Byron. A post office operated at Byron Hot Springs from 1889 to 1930.

Byron Hot Springs

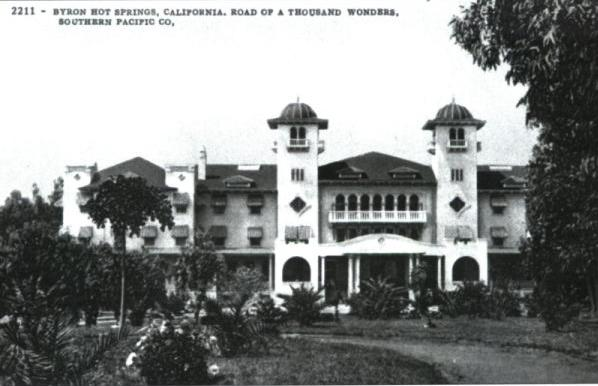
Second Byron Hot Springs Hotel, 1901–1912

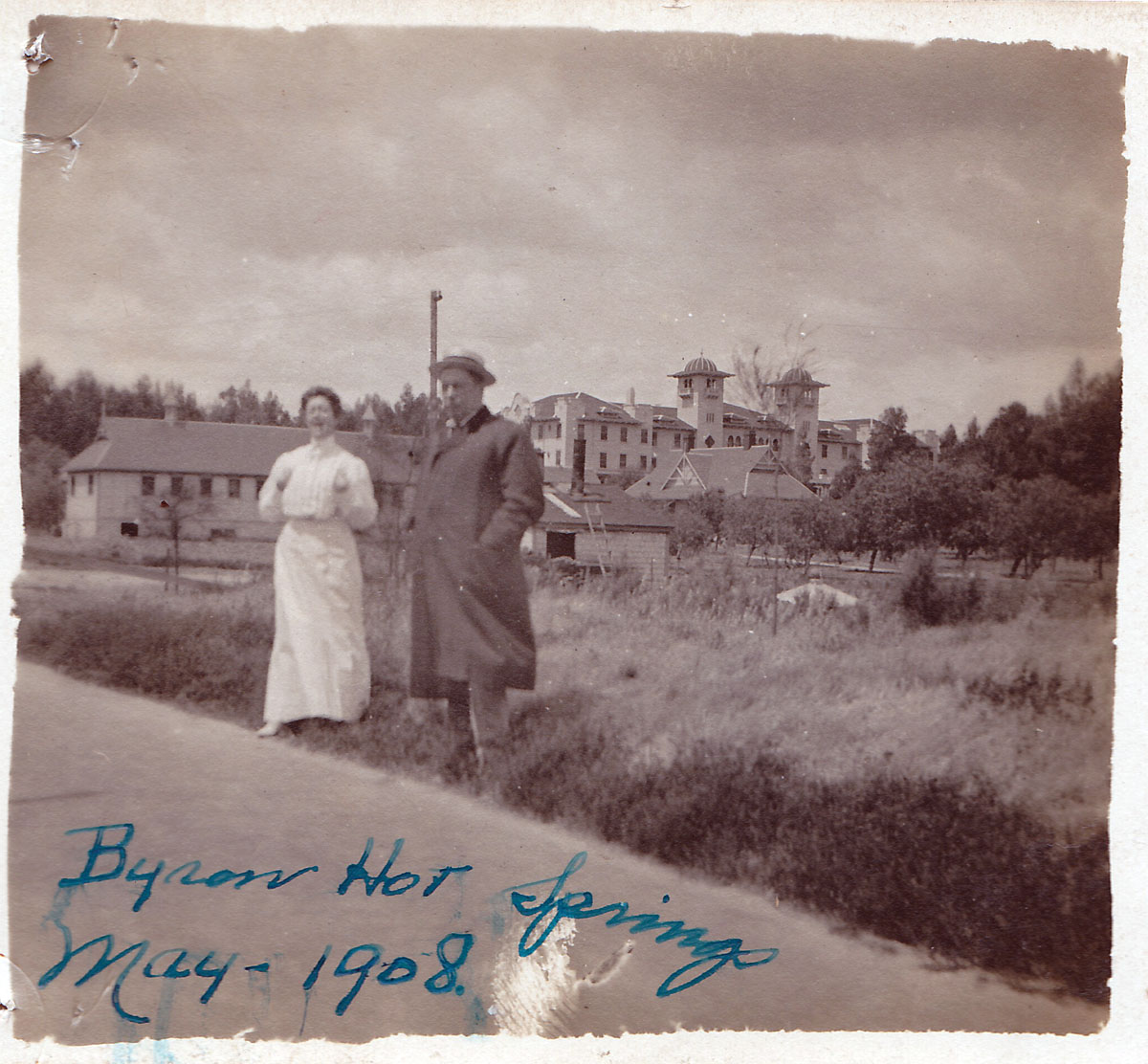
Byron Hot Springs, 1908

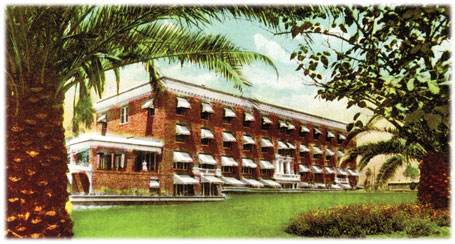
Postcard, Byron Hot Springs, 1914

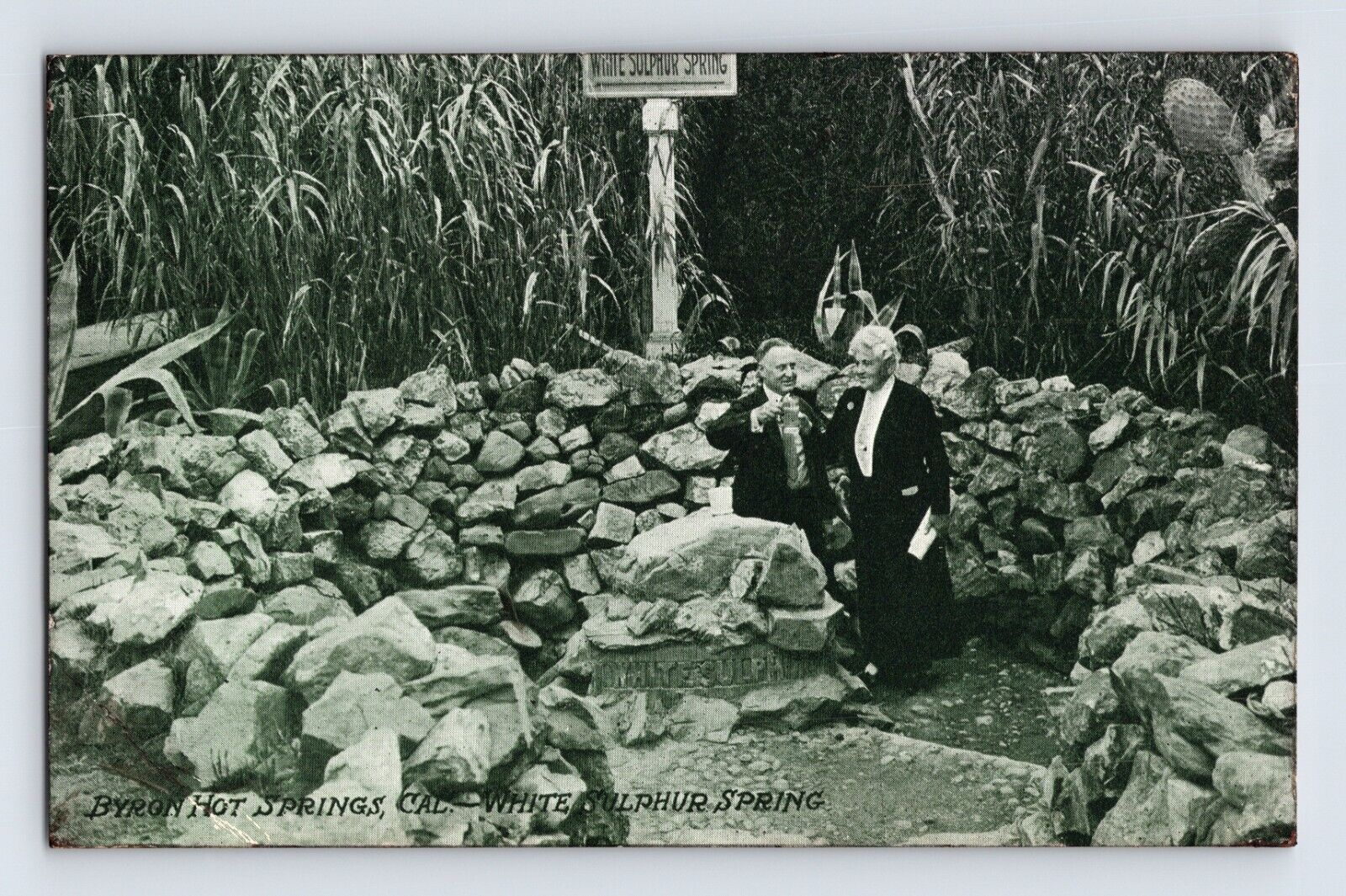
Postcard Byron Hot Springs, 1923

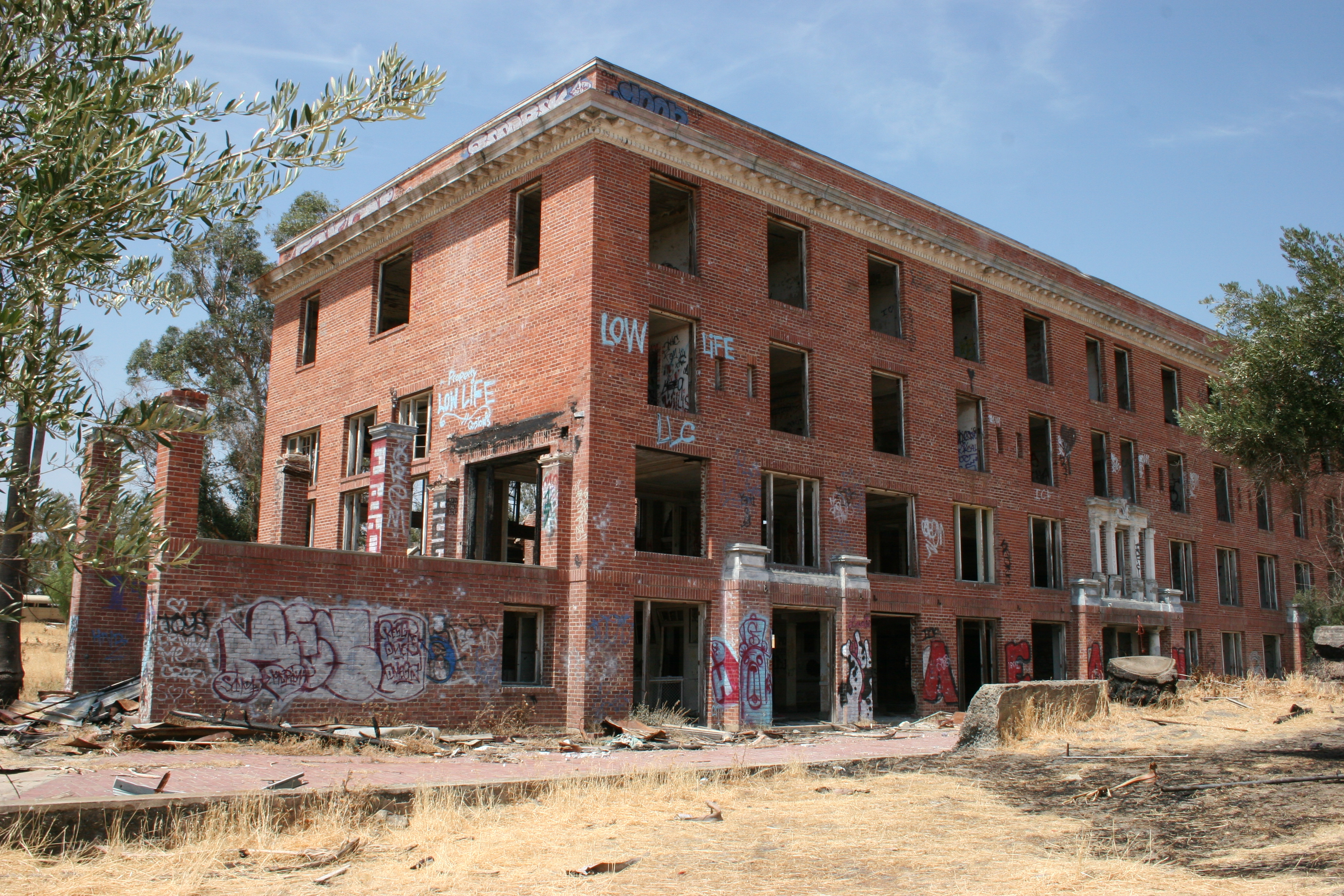
Byron Hot Springs, 2008

== Transportation ==
=== Byron Airport ===
In 1993 Contra Costa County broke ground on a new airport two miles (3 km) south of Byron. On October 8, 1994, Byron Airport was dedicated. The new airport has 1,307 acres (5.29 km^{2}) of land. 814 acres (3.29 km^{2}) are reserved for habitat management land for the San Joaquin kit fox, a federally listed endangered species, as well as many other endangered and special status species.

This is the home airport of the Patriots Jet Team. It has also been used for illegal drag races in the past.
