= Oakley, California =

City in California, United States

- City
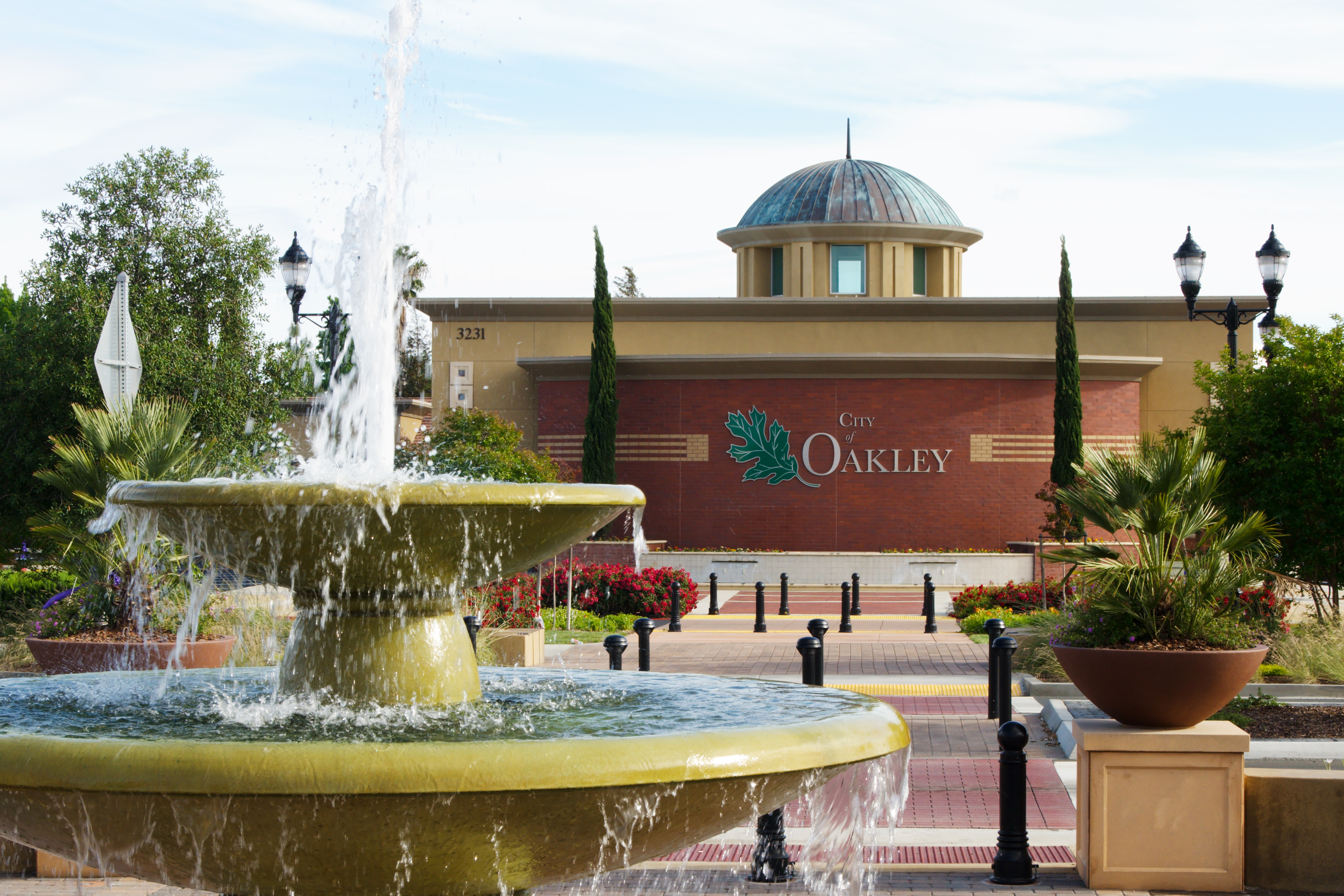
- Oakley City Hall

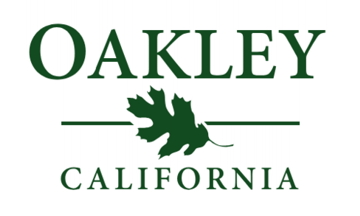
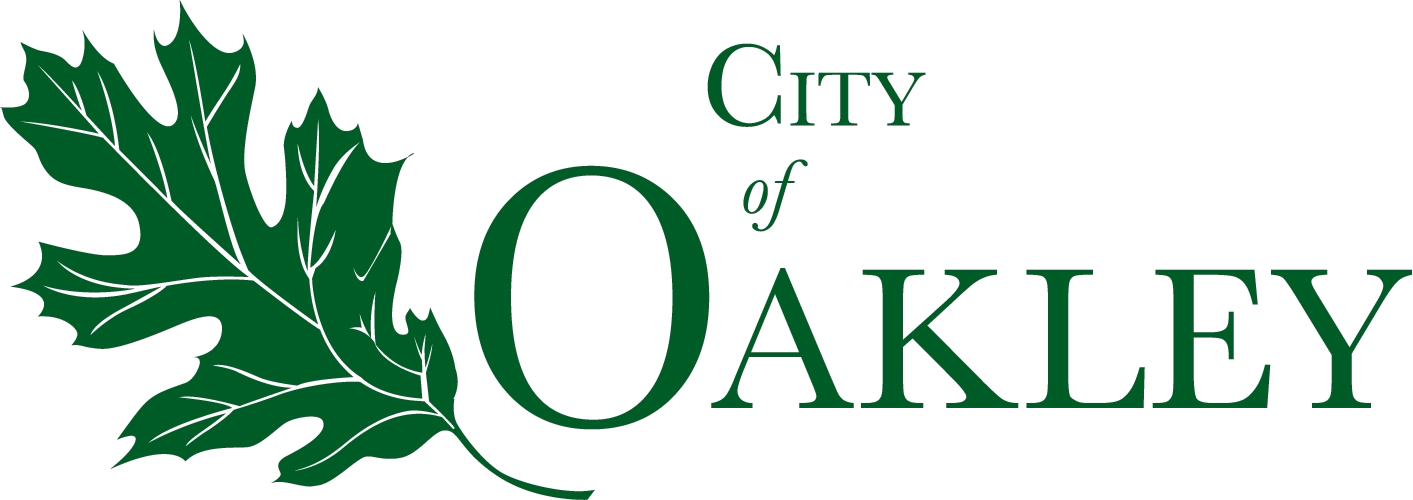
- Flag
- Interactive map of Oakley, California
- Location in the United States
- Coordinates: 37°59′51″N 121°42′45″W
- Country: United States
- State: California
- County: Contra Costa
- Incorporated: July 1, 1999

Government
  - Mayor: Shannon Shaw
  - State Senator: Christopher Cabaldon (D)
  - State Assembly: Lori Wilson (D)
  - U. S. Congress: Mark DeSaulnier (D)

Area
  - Total: 16.17 sq mi (41.88 km^{2})
  - Land: 15.86 sq mi (41.09 km^{2})
  - Water: 0.31 sq mi (0.79 km^{2}) 1.87%
- Elevation: 20 ft (6 m)

Population (2020)
  - Total: 43,357
  - Density: 2,733/sq mi (1,055/km^{2})
- Time zone: UTC-8 (PST)
  - Summer (DST): UTC-7 (PDT)
- ZIP code: 94561
- Area code: 925
- FIPS code: 06-53070
- GNIS feature IDs: 277567, 2411294
- Website: oakleyca.gov

Oakley is a city in Contra Costa County, California, United States. It is within the nine-county San Francisco Bay Area. The population at the 2020 United States census was 43,357. Oakley was incorporated in 1999, making it the newest incorporated city in Contra Costa County.

== Etymology ==
The name "oak" comes from the abundance of oak trees, while the suffix "-ley" comes from the Old English word for "field" or "meadow". The name Oakley is of Old English origin and its meaning is "meadow of oak trees". This aptly describes the area when first settled and to some extent even today. However, if not for the flip of a coin and cribbage board the community may have been named Dewey. City founder Randolph C. Marsh wanted to name the city Dewey, after Admiral George Dewey, in honor of the latter's success at the Battle of Manila Bay during the Spanish–American War. His friend Joel D. Wightman preferred the name "Oakley" because the terrain was largely meadows and oaks. To determine which name would prevail they battled it out over a game of cribbage. Marsh may have lost the game and the right to name the city but he ensured his immortality by choosing downtown street names whose first initials spelled "Marsh" — Main, Acme, Ruby, Star and Home.

== History ==
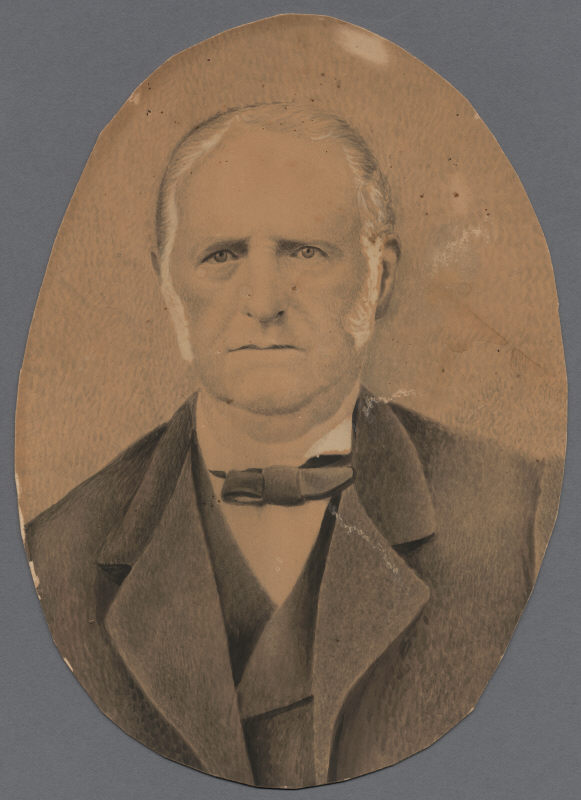
Don José Noriega, a wealthy Californio ranchero, was granted Rancho Los Méganos in 1835, covering all of modern Oakley.

=== Indigenous history ===
Archeologists have found prehistoric sites in the Oakley area. One substantial shell mound was discovered early in the 20th century near what is now the eastern edge of town. The Northwest Information Center of the California Historical Resources Information System monitors the archeological investigations undertaken in Oakley. Around three dozen such projects have been completed in the past 25 years, yielding only four prehistoric sites in the city. However, the information center believes there is a high possibility that other prehistoric sites remain within the city. To enable further archaeological excavation, the site referred to as Simon Mound was purchased by the Archaeological Conservancy after many of the ancient settlement places had already been destroyed by urban encroachment. Simone Mound has provided bones and fragments from burial sites starting around 1000 A.D. and is near a similar Conservancy preserve, the Hotchkiss Mound.

The first accounts of identifiable cultural community in the west delta are attributed to the Bay Miwoks, who occupied the region between 1100 and 1770 AD. The Bay Miwok people, usually called the Julpunes or Pulpunes by European explorers, were organized into "tribelets"—political units that included several fairly permanent villages and a set of seasonal campsites arrayed across a well-defined territory.

=== Spanish exploration ===
Incursions of the Spanish Empire into the Oakley area began in the 1770s. The first group to enter the present-day city limits was the De Anza expedition of 1775–76. However, after a failed attempt to find a route through the tule swamps to the Sierra, the De Anza expedition returned to Monterey. Subsequent expeditions by the Spanish did not result in colonization. Europeans settled in the Delta in the 19th century, but were killed by malaria and smallpox.

=== American period ===
Oakley's first post office was established in 1898.

Oakley became an incorporated city in 1999.

== Geography and environment ==
According to reports provided by Money.com, Oakley experiences 21.16 inches (537 mm) of annual rainfall with an average high temperature in July of 96.0 °F (35.6 °C) and an average low temperature in January of 40.0 °F (4.4 °C). Oakley experiences 52% clear days throughout the year.

Oakley's western border is California State Route 160. The City of Antioch adjoins Oakley on the west, the city of Brentwood adjoins Oakley on the south, and Bethel Island lies to the east. The Sacramento-San Joaquin Delta forms the northern boundary. The southwestern skyline is dominated by Mt. Diablo.

== Government ==
United States presidential election results for Oakley, California
Year	Republican		Democratic		Third party(ies)	
Year	No.	%	No.	%	No.	%
2000	3,577	41.70%	4,726	55.10%	274	3.19%
2004	4,222	45.69%	4,937	53.42%	82	0.89%
2008	4,207	36.99%	6,955	61.15%	211	1.86%
2012	4,381	36.80%	7,195	60.44%	329	2.76%
2016	5,189	37.25%	7,849	56.34%	894	6.42%
2020	7,874	39.76%	11,446	57.80%	483	2.44%
2024	8,769	45.18%	10,126	52.18%	512	2.64%

The City of Oakley is a general-law city, as opposed to a charter city, formed under state legislative statutes and governed by a body of laws in the state Constitution. Oakley operates under a council-manager form of government.

The Oakley City Council consists of five non-partisan council members elected by district. Oakley's city council members are considered part-time because, aside from being council members, they have full-time jobs. This part-time nature of the council opens up opportunities for ordinary citizens who are working in the private sector to participate.

At the first council meeting in December, the mayor is selected by a majority of the city council from among currently serving council members. At this time a vice mayor is also selected.

=== Politics ===
In 2017, Oakley had 19,906 registered voters with 9,921 (49.8%) registered as Democrats, 4,705 (23.6%) registered as Republicans, and 4,371 (22%) decline to state voters. Records show that 662 Oakley voters are registered Independents, with an additional 55 registered Green Party members.

== Agriculture ==
Oakley has had vineyards since the late 1800s. Early Portuguese and Italian immigrants found the climate amenable and planted thousands of acres of vineyards.

Nearly 80 percent of Oakley's roughly 700 acres (2.8 km^{2}) of vineyards are planted in Zinfandel. Oakley's grape harvest can conservatively be estimated at 2,000 tons. These grapes are distributed to a number of local wineries.

== Transportation ==
The BNSF Railway runs through town from east to west. This line also carries Amtrak California's Gold Runner service. In March 2023, the decision was made to close the Amtrak Antioch–Pittsburg station and replace it with Oakley Station.

California State Route 4 used to run right through town from Antioch to Brentwood on Main Street. From 2000 to 2008 a Bypass was constructed from California State Route 160 to Marsh Creek Road south of Brentwood to extend the freeway from Antioch. Oakley relinquished Hwy 4 through downtown to the state in 2012, and is now connected through the Laurel Rd exit.

Oakley is part of the East Contra Costa Bicycle Plan, which has existing facilities in Oakley as well as plans for further expansion.

== Demographics ==
Historical population
Census	Pop.	Note	%±
1970	1,306		—
1980	2,816		115.6%
1990	18,374		552.5%
2000	25,619		39.4%
2010	35,432		38.3%
2020	43,357		22.4%
U.S. Decennial Census

Oakley first appeared as a census designated place in the 1970 U.S. census.

=== 2020 census ===
As of the 2020 census, Oakley had a population of 43,357 and a population density of 2,732.7 inhabitants per square mile (1,055.1/km^{2}).

The census reported that 99.7% of the population lived in households, 0.2% lived in non-institutionalized group quarters, and 0.1% were institutionalized. 98.6% of residents lived in urban areas, while 1.4% lived in rural areas.

The age distribution was 26.7% under the age of 18, 9.0% aged 18 to 24, 28.0% aged 25 to 44, 25.3% aged 45 to 64, and 11.0% who were 65 years of age or older. The median age was 35.6 years. For every 100 females, there were 96.1 males, and for every 100 females age 18 and over there were 94.0 males age 18 and over.

There were 13,045 households, out of which 45.6% had children under the age of 18. Of all households, 61.1% were married-couple households, 6.6% were cohabiting couple households, 19.9% had a female householder with no spouse or partner present, and 12.4% had a male householder with no spouse or partner present. 13.6% of households were one person, and 6.0% were one person aged 65 or older. The average household size was 3.31. There were 10,628 families (81.5% of all households).

There were 13,379 housing units at an average density of 843.2 units per square mile (325.6 units/km^{2}), of which 13,045 (97.5%) were occupied. Of occupied units, 77.2% were owner-occupied and 22.8% were occupied by renters. 2.5% of housing units were vacant; the homeowner vacancy rate was 0.7% and the rental vacancy rate was 3.3%.

Racial composition as of the 2020 census
Race	Number	Percent
White	19,917	45.9%
Black or African American	3,627	8.4%
American Indian and Alaska Native	448	1.0%
Asian	4,107	9.5%
Native Hawaiian and Other Pacific Islander	303	0.7%
Some other race	7,320	16.9%
Two or more races	7,635	17.6%
Hispanic or Latino (of any race)	15,928	36.7%

=== 2023 ACS estimates ===
In 2023, the US Census Bureau estimated that 17.8% of the population were foreign-born. Of all people aged 5 or older, 69.5% spoke only English at home, 21.0% spoke Spanish, 3.0% spoke other Indo-European languages, 5.7% spoke Asian or Pacific Islander languages, and 0.8% spoke other languages. Of those aged 25 or older, 88.5% were high school graduates and 23.2% had a bachelor's degree.

The median household income was $132,067, and the per capita income was $43,879. About 4.9% of families and 6.6% of the population were below the poverty line.

== Education ==
The majority of the city is in the Oakley Union Elementary School District (K–8), while there are pieces in Knightsen Elementary School District and Brentwood Union Elementary School District. Those portions are also within the Liberty Union High School District. Additionally, a western portion is in a K-12 school district, Antioch Unified School District.

=== Elementary schools ===
- Oakley Elementary School
- Gehringer Elementary School
- Laurel Elementary School
- Vintage Parkway Elementary School
- Iron House Elementary School
- Orchard Park School (K–8, located in Antioch USD)
- Almond Grove Elementary School
- Summer Lake Elementary School (starting the 2019–20 academic year)

=== Middle schools ===
- O'Hara Park Middle School
- Delta Vista Middle School
- Orchard Park School (K–8, located in the Antioch Unified School District)

=== High schools ===
- Freedom High School

=== Public libraries ===
The Oakley branch of the Contra Costa County Library system is located in Oakley.

== Notable people ==
- Joe Mixon, Houston Texans running back, 2024 - former Cincinnati Bengals running back 2017–2023.
- Nguyen Do, poet, editor, and translator, relocated from San Francisco to Oakley.
- Lisa Joann Thompson, dancer, actress, choreographer, starred in In Living Color, Fame L.A. and Motown Live, lived in Oakley during her high school years.
- Malik Izaak Taylor, known professionally as Phife Dawg (or simply Phife), was an American rapper and a member of the group A Tribe Called Quest, relocated from New York to Oakley.
