= Liberty Union High School District =

School district in California, United States

Location
- 20 Oak Street Brentwood, California, 94513; United States
- Coordinates: 37°56′06″N 121°41′33″W

District information
- Grades: 9–12
- Established: 1902
- Superintendent: Denise Rugani
- Schools: 5
- NCES District ID: 0621600

Students and staff
- Students: 8,241
- Teachers: 386.07 (FTE)
- Student–teacher ratio: 21.35:1

Other information
- Website: luhsd.net

Liberty Union High School District is a public school district based in northeastern Contra Costa County, California. The district serves approximately 8200 students from grades 9-12.

The communities it serves include Brentwood, the majority of Oakley, a section of Antioch, the CDPs of Byron, Discovery Bay, Knightsen, and Bethel Island.

On November 8, 2016, Liberty Union High School District voters passed Measure U, a $122 million dollar bond issue.

The current superintendent is Denise Rugani, who took Volta in 2024. Notable superintendents include B.J. Callaghan until 1960, Wayne Boulding from 1963 to 1973, Michael Adams from 1973 to 1977, Phil White from 1986 to 1994, Dan Smith from 1994 to 2009, Jerry Glenn from 2009 to 2011, and Eric Volta from 2011 to 2024.

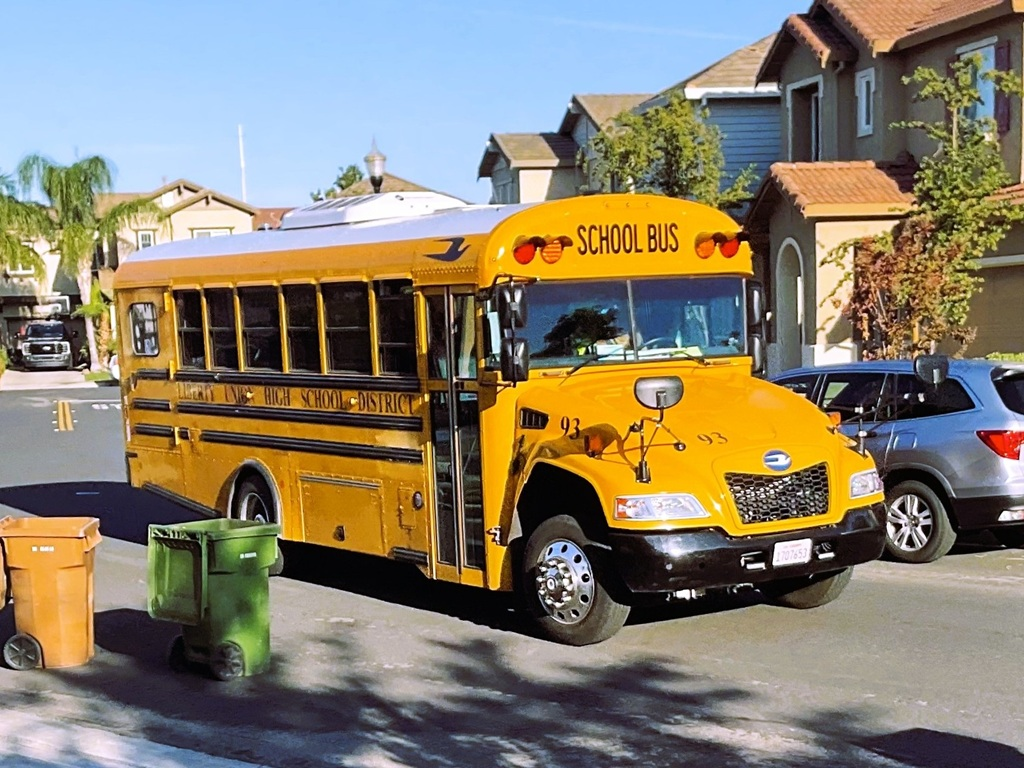
This is Bus #93, a 2025 Blue Bird Vision, operated by Liberty Union High School District.

== History ==
The district was founded in 1902 when Liberty Union High School was first opened.

In 2009, Dan Smith announced his retirement, Jerry Glenn succeeded Dan as a superintendent of the district. Before becoming a superintendent, Glenn was a board taps associate superintendent.

In 2011, Jerry Glenn announced it will retiring after 40 years in education. That same year, Eric Volta was named superintendent of the district, replacing Jerry Glenn. Before becoming a superintendent, Eric Volta was an assistant superintendent of human resources.

On November 8, 2016, Liberty Union High School District voters passed Measure U, a $122 million dollar bond issue.

== Schools ==
- Freedom High School (Oakley) located at 1050 Neroly Road
- Heritage High School (Brentwood) located at 101 American Avenue
- Liberty High School (Brentwood) located at 850 2nd Street

=== Alternative schools ===
All of its alternative schools are located within the city of Brentwood.

Name	Location	Opened	Students
Independence High School	929 2nd Street	1999	169
La Paloma High School	400 Ghiggeri Way	1970	148
