= Marsh Creek (California) =

Marsh Creek Arroyo De Los Poblanos
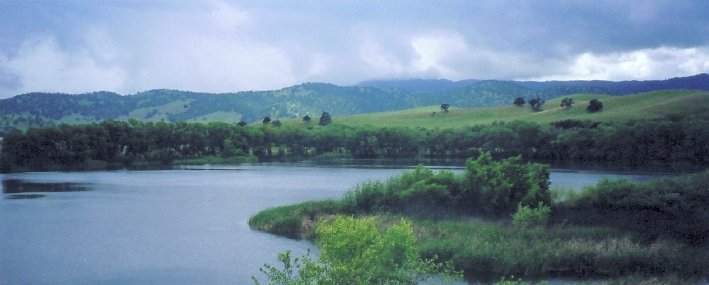
- Marsh Creek Reservoir, October 9, 2014

- Location of the mouth of Marsh Creek in California Marsh Creek (California) (California)

Location
- Country: United States
- State: California
- Region: Contra Costa County

Physical characteristics
- Source: Eastern Mount Diablo in Morgan Territory Regional Preserve
  - location: 12 mi (19 km) SSE of Clayton, California
  - coordinates: 37°48′43″N 121°48′06″W
  - elevation: 2,360 ft (720 m)
- Mouth
  - location: Sacramento–San Joaquin River Delta at Oakley, California
  - coordinates: 38°00′52″N 121°41′04″W
  - elevation: 0 ft (0 m)

Basin features
- Tributaries
  - left: Briones Creek, Dry Creek, Deer Creek, Sand Creek
  - right: Sycamore Creek, Kellogg Creek

Marsh Creek is a stream in east Contra Costa County, California in Northern California which rises on the eastern side of Mount Diablo and flows 30 miles (48 km) to the Sacramento–San Joaquin River Delta at Oakley, California, near Big Break Regional Shoreline. The creek flows through Marsh Creek State Park, where water is impounded to form Marsh Creek Reservoir, then through the city of Brentwood, California.

== History ==
The creek bears the name of notable California pioneer John Marsh who built his home on the creek in 1838 after acquiring the Rancho Los Meganos Mexican land grant from Jose Noriega on the western edge of the town of Brentwood and just to the east of what is now Clayton, California. Marsh Creek was originally named Arroyo De Los Poblanos.

== Watershed ==
The Marsh Creek watershed drains about 100 square miles (260 km^{2}) of the eastern slopes of Mt. Diablo and the neighboring portions of the Black Hills. Its upper tributaries are intermittent and small perennial streams which flow northwesterly until the creek turns east at Marsh Creek Springs. The creek was dammed downstream from the Springs in the 1960s, forming Marsh Creek Reservoir. The dam is south of Brentwood and north of the intersection of Marsh Creek Road and Camino Diablo Road. Major tributaries are Briones, Dry, Deer and Sand Creeks. Briones Creek, which drains the undeveloped Briones Valley, flows into Marsh Creek at Marsh Creek Reservoir, which lies in Marsh Creek State Park (California). Dry, Deer, and Sand creeks all flow into Marsh Creek within the city limits of Brentwood. The creek is largely channelized in the lower watershed, and includes a drop structure near the city of Brentwood that appears to be a complete passage barrier. The lower stretch of the creek includes 11 miles (18 km) from the outfall of the Marsh Creek Reservoir into the western Delta at the Big Break Regional Shoreline area of the Sacramento–San Joaquin River Delta northeast of the city of Oakley.

== Conservation and ecology ==
Human activities have led to the loss of over 80 percent of suitable spawning habitat for fall-run Chinook salmon (Oncorhynchus tshawytscha) in the Sacramento and San Joaquin River watersheds. There are archeological records of Chinook salmon at CCO-18, a site dating to 1000-1500 C.E. in the John Marsh State Historic Park in the Marsh Creek watershed. Straightening of lower Marsh Creek for flood control steepened its gradient relative to its original meandering course, requiring construction of a 6 foot (1.8 m) waterfall drop structure in 1958 below Marsh Creek Dam (4 miles from the creek mouth). The drop structure and the Marsh Creek Reservoir dam (constructed in 1963) are complete barriers to anadromous fish migration. Below the dam and above the drop structure barrier, there is approximately 7 miles (11 km) suitable gravel quality, quantity, and vegetative cover to support Chinook salmon spawning. The presence of coastal rainbow trout (Oncorhynchus mykiss irideus) has not been established in fish surveys of Marsh Creek above the drop structure. In December 2010, American Rivers, the Natural Heritage Institute and the Contra Costa Water District (CCWD), constructed a $400,000 fish ladder that made passage of the drop structure possible for the first time in 52 years, enabling Chinook salmon and steelhead to potentially use the next 7 miles (11 km) of stream channel, up to the Marsh Creek Reservoir Dam, as well as the Sand Creek and Deer Creek tributaries. The Friends of Marsh Creek Watershed citizen salmon monitoring program had identified salmon congregating immediately below the drop structure barrier prior to construction of the fish ladder. On December 2, 2012, Chinook salmon were videotaped above the fish ladder between Balfour and Central Avenue. By December 2016, Chinook salmon numbering in the hundreds used the fish ladder and returned to Marsh Creek to spawn.

Numerous perennial pools in the intermediate and upper zones of the Marsh Creek watershed have been rumored to support rainbow trout (Oncorhynchus mykiss), however this has not been confirmed by fish sampling studies. If rainbow trout were identified in the higher watershed it would raise the possibility that steelhead trout historically used Marsh Creek for spawning. Recent observations of perennial pools in the upper reach of Sand Creek in Black Diamond Mines Regional Preserve suggest that removal of the two existing migration barriers on Sand Creek might open up suitable habitat for steelhead trout.

The intermediate and upper watershed zones are also home to four federally listed faunal species – the Alameda whipsnake (Masticophis lateralis), California red-legged frog (Rana aurora draytonii), San Joaquin kit fox (Vulpes macrotis mutica), and vernal pool fairy shrimp (Branchinecta lynchi).

The tidal waters at the mouth of Marsh Creek and Big Break provide habitat for the federally threatened Sacramento splittail (Pogonichthys macrolepidotus) and Delta smelt (Hypomesus transpacificus). Big Break, where Marsh Creek enters the Delta, is one of only three locations where adult splittail still congregate in large numbers. In 2017 the Department of Water Resources will put out bids for the Dutch Slough Tidal Marsh Restoration Project, which will re-route the last quarter mile of Marsh Creek through the levee area there and create a tidal plain for salmon rearing and habitat for other endangered species.

In 2014, Save Mount Diablo (SMD), a conservation group, announced that it had bought a 51 acres (21 ha) tract of land along a 3,100 foot (940 m) stretch of Marsh Creek. The tract, known as Big Bend, lies between Clayton and Brentwood. SMD had bought the land from a bank at an online auction. Spokespersons for SMD say they want to turn the tract over to a public park agency eventually. Meanwhile, the group will protect the land. The previous owners, who were unidentified, had used the land as a horse pasture for many years, but had lost ownership through foreclosure.

== Marsh Creek Regional Trail ==
Marsh Creek Regional Trail is a recreational trail along Marsh Creek. It connects Creekside Park, a city park in Brentwood, with Big Break Regional Shoreline in Oakley. The trail is designed for hiking and bicycling. Most of the trail is paved and designated as multi-use. It is managed by the East Bay Regional Park District (EBRPD) and is approximately 6.5 miles (10.5 km) long.

There are plans for extending the trail from Brentwood to Morgan Territory Regional Preserve and Round Valley Regional Preserve, making the total length 14 miles (23 km).

== See also ==
- Big Break Regional Shoreline
- Marsh Creek State Park (California)
- Mount Diablo
