= Liberty High School (Brentwood, California) =

Public high school in California, United States

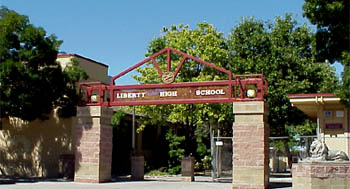

Location
- 850 2nd Street; Brentwood, California 94513; United States; 37°56′08″N 121°41′40″W

Information
- Type: Public
- Established: 1902
- School district: Liberty Union High School District
- Principal: Efa Huckaby
- Teaching staff: 131.36 (on an FTE basis)
- Grades: 9–12
- Enrollment: 2,836 (2024–2025)
- Student to teacher ratio: 21.59
- Colors: Cardinal and gold
- Athletics conference: CIF North Coast Section
- Mascot: Lion
- Newspaper: The Lion's Roar
- Yearbook: Lion
- Website: lhs.luhsd.net

Liberty High School is located in Brentwood, California, United States. It is a comprehensive 9–12 grade high school serving approximately 2,800 students. It was founded in 1902 as Liberty Union High School.

== Overview ==
Liberty is organized into four Small Learning Communities (SLC). SLC leadership teams include an assistant principal, counselor, SLC coordinator and academy director. Career specific academy programs are available to students in grades 10 through 12. These programs highlight business & technology, health careers, teaching & learning careers, arts, and humanities.

Liberty is known for their Student Learning Careers, such as the TLC academy for students who plan on childcare or teaching careers, as well as their PADA academy for art-oriented students. In 2017, Liberty High PADA students completed a public beautification project in Oak Meadow Park by crafting a mural.

Liberty High School's official newspaper is The Lion's Roar. This quarterly publication is typically eight pages in length and is produced by approximately twenty students enrolled in Journalism. It was the second place bracket winner of the American Scholastic Press Association's newspaper competition in 2014 and 2015.

The Lion Pride Marching Band is the school’s marching band. The band competes in competitive field show circuits such as Northern California Band Association and the Western Band Association. They also annually participate in community events such as the Liberty High School Homecoming Parade, the Brentwood Holiday Parade, and the Discovery Bay Holiday Parade.

== History ==
=== Early years ===
In August 1902, Liberty Union High School opened its doors in the backroom of the Brentwood Grammar School, which is now Brentwood Elementary School. The first graduation was held in June 1905 with only one graduate, Edith A. Sellers. Also, the first yearbook for Liberty Union High School was published. However, There were only sixteen pages and no photographs.

In 1907, Cardinal and gold were selected as the school's colors, a tradition that remains to this day. In 1908, Liberty Union High School was moved to its own building at First Street. This building was built for $9,000, where the Brentwood Veterans Memorial Building stands today. In 1913, the student body chose to name their yearbook the "Liberty Bell," while the active drama association performed many plays, including "The Minister's Wife."

In 1917, Erastus G. Nash become the principal of Liberty Union High School, who remained there until 1947. Today, his legacy is honored by Nash Hall in the middle of the present campus. In 1918, the school was destroyed by a fire because of a chemistry experiment gone wrong.

=== Moving to a current site and school expanding ===
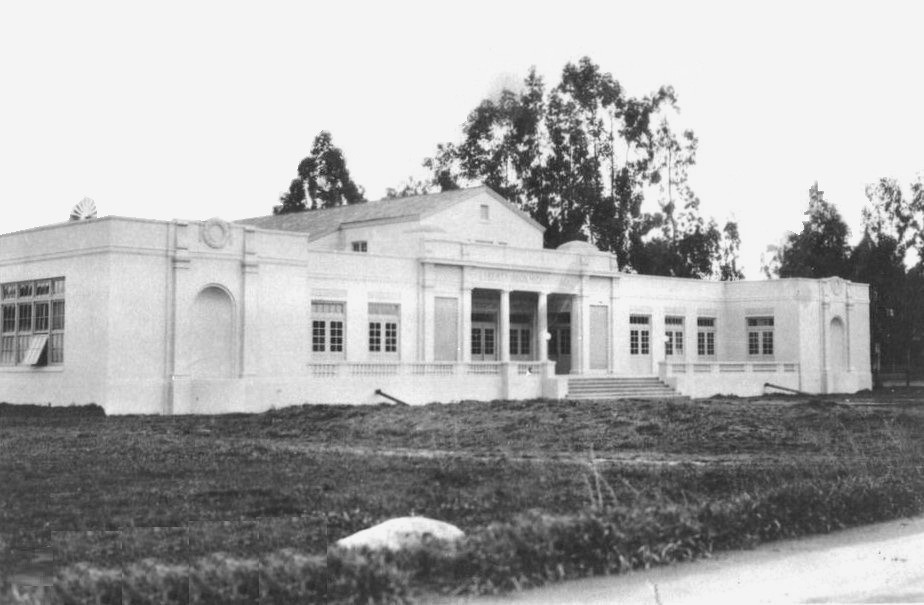
The original building located on 2nd Street was existed from 1920 to 1963

In 1920, Liberty Union High School moved to its current site at Second Street. The new building for Liberty Union High School was built for US$93,000 (equivalent to $1,494,643 in 2025). The 1920 building housed the administrative offices, counseling offices, and classrooms. But, It contained more classrooms, athletic fields, a library, and an 800-seat auditorium.

In 1936, The school's mascot became the lion as a tribute to the help of the Lions Club. In 1940, The A building was built. The A building was originally used for home-making. Later, The A building was used as a administration building, which was moved to the AD building. Today, it is now a classrooms building. In 1942, the Agriculture building, now used for Liberty Auto Shop was built. In 1947, the Lion Broadcaster (now known as the Lion's Roar), the school newspaper, began publication and brought news to the student body.

Beginning with the 1947–1948 school year, B.J. Callaghan replaced Erastus G. Nash as a principal of Liberty Union High School. Today, his legacy is honored by the B.J. Callaghan Library in the present campus. B.J. Callaghan originally served as a vice principal from 1924 to 1947. In the late 1940s, Liberty Union High School's original B and C classroom buildings was built. It was demolished and replaced with the new B and C classroom buildings less than 75 years later.

=== 1963 building fire and rebuilding ===
On March 24, 1963, the 1920 Liberty Union High School building was destroyed by a fire, which was set up by a disgruntled student. In 1965, the new buildings used for Liberty Union High School was built. The first main building contained the study hall, cafeteria, kitchen, lunch line, and the atrium. The second building contained the Art and the Career Technical Education (CTE) Departments. The third building, known as the Nash Hall contained the classrooms, and was named after Erastus G. Nash. The fourth building, known as the B.J. Callaghan Library contained the Library, and was named after B.J. Callaghan.

In early 2002, the school changed to its current name as "Liberty High School". In 2005, William C. Batze, a long-term teacher at the school, announced his retirement at the school after his 40 years of education. Since 1965, Batze had taught 6,700 students, graded 780,000 papers and worked more than 7,200 days.

On November 8, 2016, Liberty Union High School District voters passed Measure U, a $122 million dollar bond issue. The project at Liberty High School includes the football field stadium, increased parking, administration offices, classrooms, cafeteria renovation, and an aquatic center. In 2022, The school's cafeteria was renovated.

== Athletics ==
Liberty High School's teams are known as the Lions. Liberty competes in the Bay Valley Athletic League, and North Coast Section of the California Interscholastic Federation.

=== Sports ===
Sports teams offered include:

- Baseball
- Basketball (boys' freshman, junior varsity and varsity; girls' freshman, junior varsity and varsity)
- Cross country
- Football (freshman, junior varsity and varsity)
- Golf (boys' varsity and girls' varsity)
- Soccer (boys' junior varsity and varsity; girls' junior varsity and varsity)
- Softball (freshman, junior varsity and varsity)
- Stunt
- Swimming
- Tennis (boys' varsity and girls' varsity)
- Track and field
- Unified sports (soccer and bowling)
- Volleyball (boys' and girls')
- Water polo (boys' and girls')
- Wrestling ((boys' junior varsity and varsity; girls' varsity)

=== State championships ===
Liberty won their first CIF state football championship in 2018.

== Notable alumni ==
- J. Douglas Adams, superintendent of the Brentwood Union School District from 1991 to 2007
- Chris Gruler, drafted #1 by the Cincinnati Reds, 3rd overall in the 2002 Major League Baseball draft, minor league baseball pitcher
- Mike McCarthy, MLB baseball player
- Brent Mydland, keyboardist and vocalist for the Grateful Dead from 1979 to 1990
- Jaden Rashada, college football quarterback
- Matt Riley, drafted in the 3rd round by the Baltimore Orioles in the 1997 Major League Baseball draft
- Delanie Sheehan, soccer player for Gotham FC of the National Women's Soccer League
- Jacob Spomer, NFL center for the Los Angeles Chargers
- Lisa Joann Thompson, dancer, actress, and choreographer, starred in In Living Color, Fame L.A., and Motown Live
- Sione Vaki, NFL safety for the Detroit Lions
