= Jacob Spomer =

American football player (born 2001)

No. 60 – Los Angeles Chargers
- Position: Center
- Roster status: Active

Personal information
- Born: January 24, 2001 (age 25); Brentwood, California, U.S.
- Listed height: 6 ft 3 in (1.91 m)
- Listed weight: 290 lb (132 kg)

Career information
- High school: Liberty (Brentwood, California)
- College: Diablo Valley (2020–2021); Fresno State (2022–2025)
- NFL draft: 2026: undrafted

Career history
- Los Angeles Chargers (2026–present)

Awards and highlights
- First-team All-Mountain West (2025)

Career NFL statistics as of Week 4, 2026
- Games played: 1
- Stats at Pro Football Reference

Jacob Spomer (born January 24, 2001) is an American professional football center for the Los Angeles Chargers of the National Football League (NFL). He played college football for the Diablo Valley Vikings and Fresno State Bulldogs.

== Early life ==
Spomer was born on October 10, 2002, and grew up in Brentwood, California. He attended Liberty High School where he played football as an offensive lineman, earning honorable mention all-league honors as a senior in 2019. After high school, Spomer enrolled at Diablo Valley College. He did not play for the Diablo Valley Vikings in 2020, as the season was canceled due to the COVID-19 pandemic. He then was an all-conference performer in 2021.

Spomer transferred to the Fresno State Bulldogs in 2022. He spent three seasons as a left tackle for the Bulldogs before switching to center. He started all 14 games in 2022 and 10 games in 2023, earning honorable mention All-Mountain West Conference (MW) honors both years. He suffered an injury towards the end of the 2023 season causing him to miss most of the following season. In 2024, Spomer redshirted while starting four games. He played a final season for the Bulldogs in 2025 and did not allow a sack, earning first-team All-MW honors.

== Professional career ==
Pre-draft measurables
Height	Weight	Arm length	Hand span	Wingspan	40-yard dash	10-yard split	20-yard split	20-yard shuttle	Three-cone drill	Vertical jump	Broad jump	Bench press
6 ft 2 1/4 in (1.89 m)	290 lb (132 kg)	31 1/4 in (0.79 m)	10 1/8 in (0.26 m)	6 ft 4 1/4 in (1.94 m)	5.14 s	1.80 s	2.94 s	4.60 s	7.37 s	28.0 in (0.71 m)	9 ft 5 in (2.87 m)	28 reps
All values from Pro Day

After going unselected in the 2026 NFL draft, Spomer signed with the Los Angeles Chargers as an undrafted free agent. He made the team's final roster for the 2026 season.
