= John Marsh (pioneer) =

American physician

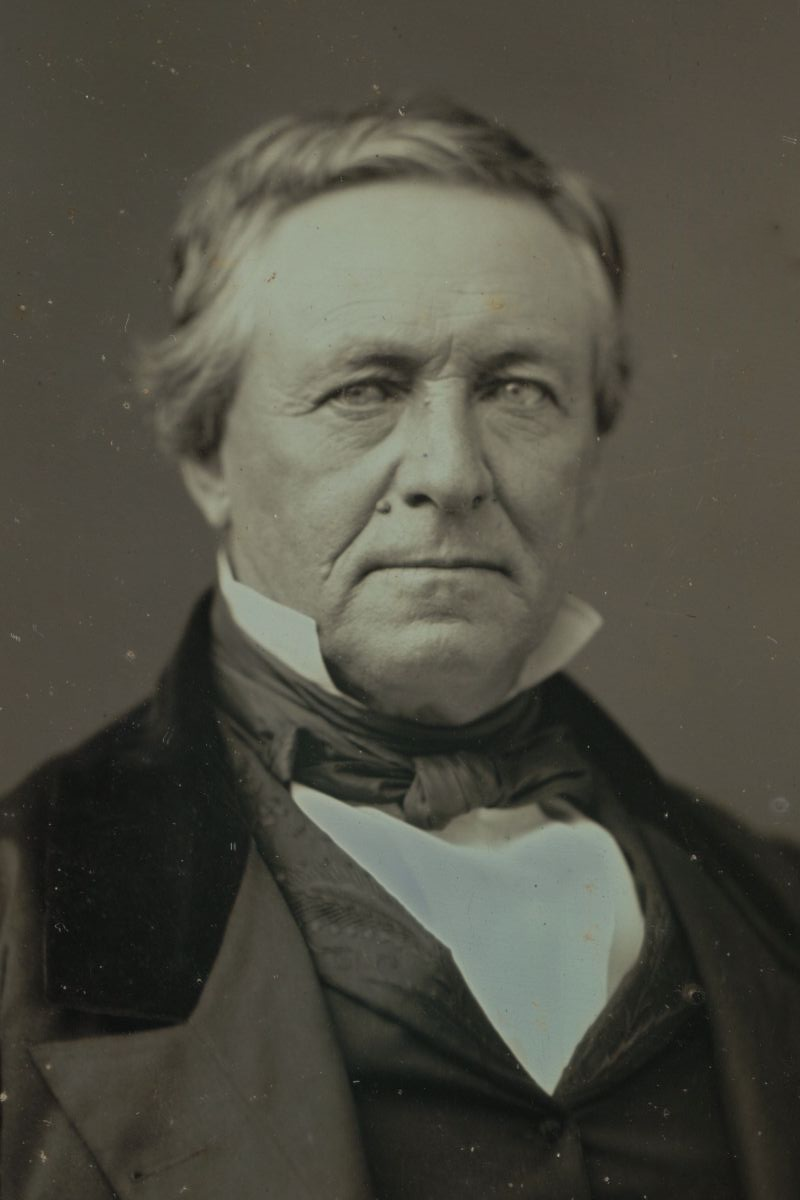
- John Marsh in 1852
- Born: June 5, 1799; Danvers, Massachusetts, U.S.
- Died: September 24, 1856 (aged 57); Vine Hill, California
- Citizenship: United States; Mexico
- Education: Harvard University
- Occupations: Medical doctor, rancher
- Known for: Early California pioneer
- Spouse: Abigail Smith Tuck
- Partner: Marguerite Deconteaux
- Children: Charles (son), Abigail (daughter)
- Parent(s): John Marsh Sr. (father), Polly Brown (mother)

John Marsh (June 5, 1799 – September 24, 1856), later known in Spanish as Don Juan Marsh, was a medical doctor, ranchero, and linguist in California when it was still part of the Republic of Mexico. Born in Massachusetts, Marsh immigrated to California in 1836, where he became a Mexican citizen. He was baptized as Roman Catholic in order to buy land, and acquired the vast land grant of Rancho Los Méganos in Contra Costa. He became one of the wealthiest ranchers in California, and was among the highly influential men who worked to gain United States statehood after Mexico ceded this area following its defeat in the Mexican-American War.

Marsh knew Hebrew, Latin and Greek, and, while working as a US Indian agent at Fort Snelling, was the first person to compile a dictionary of the Sioux language. He is the namesake of Marsh Creek and Marsh Creek State Park in Contra Costa County. The John Marsh Historic Trust was organized to protect his legacy.

== Early life ==
Born in Danvers, Massachusetts in 1799, Marsh graduated from the private Phillips Academy in Andover in 1819. He attended Harvard College from 1819 to 1823 and received a bachelor's degree. Colbruno writes that Marsh was dismissed from Harvard for participating in a student uprising. He was readmitted in 1821, after promising not to engage in any further disturbances. He originally planned to study for the ministry, but changed his major to medicine after his readmission. He studied medicine with a Boston doctor.

Marsh migrated west, living in the Michigan Territory, where he opened a school, the first in what is now Minnesota. Marsh was appointed by the federal government as a United States Indian agent for the Sioux Agency at Fort Snelling, (Note: Fort Snelling, in what is now Hennepin County, Minnesota. It was named Fort Saint Anthony when it was founded in 1819. It was renamed in 1825 to honor its founder, Colonel Josiah Snelling) At Fort Snelling, Marsh took a Lakota/French mistress named Marguerite Decouteaux; they had a son Charles together. Territorial Governor Lewis Cass appointed Marsh as Justice of the Peace in Crawford County (which included what is now southern Wisconsin, northern Illinois, and portions of Iowa and Minnesota), whereupon he became known as "Judge Marsh."

While at Fort Snelling, Marsh resumed his study of medicine, with the post doctor, Dr. Purcell. Because Purcell died before Marsh completed his studies, he never received a certificate. Marsh lived for a time in Prairie du Chien, Wisconsin, where he got involved in the Black Hawk War between the United States and a group of Sauk, Meskwaki (Fox), and Kickapoo, known as the "British Band". As the Sioux supported the US against their old rivals, Marsh was blamed for a Sioux massacre of Fox and Sauk warriors.

As a result, he fled the area, taking Decouteaux and their son with him and settling in New Salem, Illinois. Leaving the pair there, he returned to Prairie du Chien. Decouteaux was pregnant again and pining for Marsh; she tried to walk the several hundred miles to rejoin him. The journey exhausted her, and she and their second child died in childbirth. Marsh placed his young son, Charles, to be raised with a family named Painter in New Salem.

He again became involved in Indian affairs. He was discovered selling guns illegally to some of the Indians and had to flee the territory, this time settling in Independence, Missouri, where he became a merchant. Marsh visited his son again before his business failed, and in 1836 he emigrated, as an employee of the American Fur Company, to Santa Fe, New Mexico. He proceeded to Southern California via the Santa Fe Trail. Both areas were part of the Republic of Mexico, which had gained independence from Spain in 1821.

== Life in California ==
In southern California, Marsh claimed he was the only person who had any knowledge of Western (or European-style) medicine. He presented his Harvard degree to the local Mexican government of Alta California. The degree was written in Latin, which none of the local authorities could read. They took his word and granted him permission to practice medicine. Marsh was quite successful in his new profession, but his prices were very high. He sometimes charged as much as a head of cattle to deliver a baby. He is credited as being the first person to practice medicine in California.

He was often paid in the currency of the day: cowhides and tallow. Marsh joked that his adobe looked more like a warehouse than the offices of a physician. In 1836, he sold his accumulated inventory to a Boston trader for $500 and rode to Northern California seeking a ranch to purchase. Since Mexico allowed only Catholics to own land in California, he became baptized as a Roman Catholic.

In 1837, Marsh purchased the 17,000-acre Rancho Los Méganos, a land grant, from prominent Californio ranchero José Noriega on what is now called Marsh Creek. This was east of what is now Clayton, California and on the western edge of the present-day city of Brentwood. (His acquisition of the rancho indicates that Marsh had become a naturalized Mexican citizen). The price he paid for the rancho was $500 (all of his savings). He became the first known non-Hispanic white settler in what is now Contra Costa County.

Marsh prospered there, both as a rancher and as a doctor. He continued to invest by purchasing more land near his original rancho. Before his death, he claimed that his rancho contained about 40,000 acres of land. In practicing medicine, he again charged very high prices, generally in relation to how far he had to travel to see the patient (which often meant being away from his ranch for days or weeks). There is some evidence that during this period, he cared for some of the survivors of the Donner Party.

Marsh acquired tens of thousands of head of cattle for his rancho and lived the life of a wealthy ranchero. He was known to pay very low wages to his workers, and many were said to hate him. In 1841, when the first American emigrant party, the Bartleson-Bidwell Party, reached California from Missouri. There were 32 men and one woman and her baby. Marsh invited them to be his guests. The California Trail thus terminated in Brentwood.

After entertaining members of the Bartleson-Bidwell Party, Marsh was said to invite them to slaughter one of his steers for breakfast the next morning. The next day, however, he found that the party had also slaughtered his best work oxen, which comprised a highly valuable commodity and were critical to ranch operations. Although it was likely a mistake, Marsh was angry and bitter toward the party. Later there were further disagreements between them. John Bidwell reportedly said that "John Marsh is the meanest man I ever met." Among the Bartleson-Bidwell Party was Nancy Kelsey, known as the first woman to cross the Sierras to reach California. She later became known as the "Betsy Ross of California" after she created the state's first flag.

As early as 1837, Marsh worried about being able to retain ownership of the great rancho. Americans and some other foreigners considered the Mexican courts in California to be corrupt and unpredictable in their rulings on such cases. In addition, there was evidence of competition by the Russians, French and English, who were independently preparing to seize the province. Marsh was determined to have the territory become part of the United States to protect his holdings. He felt the best method to achieve that was to encourage emigration by Americans to California, and in this way repeat the history of Texas as a takeover by more numerous Americans.

Marsh conducted a letter-writing campaign espousing the California climate, soil and other reasons to settle there, as well as the best route to follow, which became known as "Marsh's route." His letters were read, reread, passed around, and printed in newspapers throughout the country, and stimulated the first significant migration to California. Marsh invited immigrants to stay on his ranch until they could get settled, and assisted in their obtaining passports.

After ushering in the period of organized emigration to California, Marsh helped take California from the last Mexican governor, thereby paving the way to California's ultimate acquisition by the United States.

Marsh worked behind the scenes to promote American statehood, at the urging of U.S. consul Thomas O. Larkin. In March 1845 he wrote a letter signed by himself and 23 other expatriates, announcing a clandestine meeting for the Fourth of July. This letter has been designated by modern historians as the "Call To Foreigners". While Marsh did not take credit as the author, historians agree that it is his work. The meeting's purpose was to, "promote the union and harmony and best interests of all the foreigners resident in California..." Marsh also participated in the Battle of Providencia (also known as the Second Battle of Cahuenga Pass), and managed to persuade Americans on both sides that it was foolish to fight one another. As a result of Marsh's urging, these soldiers united, which resulted in the defeat of unpopular Governor Manuel Micheltorena's forces. Micheltorena was deported to Mexico and replaced by native-born Californian Pio Pico.

During this period Marsh began a search to reunite with his son, Charles, but was unable to find him. In 1851, the Reverend William W. Smith introduced Marsh to Abigail "Abby" Smith Tuck, a schoolteacher from New England, who served as principal at a girls school in San Jose. After a brief two-week courtship, they married on June 24, 1851. Soon after the wedding, the couple moved into the old adobe. On 12 March 1852, she gave birth to a daughter they named Alice Frances.

== John Marsh House ==
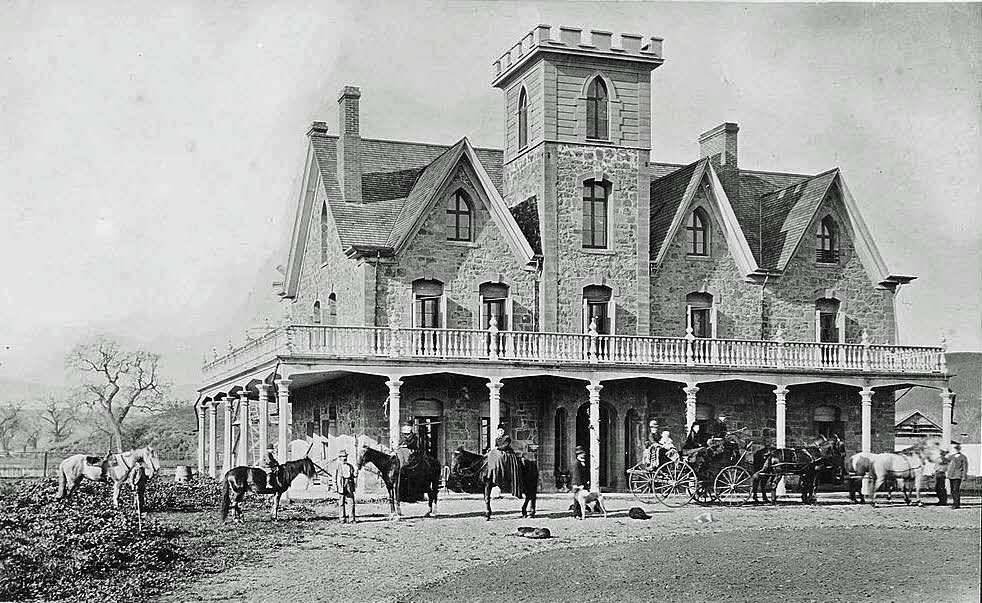
John Marsh house (ca 1870). The house still exists, and has been stabilized, but awaits restoration (pending fundraising). See external links below.

Marsh soon began construction of a mansion built entirely of stone quarried from the nearby hills. Abby chose to site the house next to Marsh Creek, with a fine view of the surrounding valley and Mount Diablo. The present city of Brentwood, California developed north of here. Designed by San Francisco architect Thomas Boyd, the 7,000 square feet (650 m^{2}) Gothic-Revival style home incorporated a 65 feet (20 m) tower and exterior porch supported by octagonal pillars. The entire cost of the home did not exceed $20,000. Abby died in 1855, before the Stone House was completed. Marsh moved into the new house about three weeks before he was murdered.

His son and daughter inherited the ranch and stone house, in which they continued to live. They apparently let the property fall into disrepair and decay, and eventually became renters. They were visited in May 1862 by William Henry Brewer and the California Geological Survey.

The mansion still stands as part of the Marsh Creek State Park, formerly known as Cowell Ranch/John Marsh Property State Historic Park. The state has supported applying for status for the property as a National Historic Monument. The park includes 3,659 acres (1,481 ha) of natural habitat. The mansion is on the list of National Register of Historic Places.

The Cowell Foundation (founded by industrialist S. H. Cowell) donated the house and surrounding property to the county in 1960, with the condition that the house would be restored. it is now part of Marsh Creek State Park, which is not open to the public. The house has not been restored, and awaits funding for this project.

== Death ==
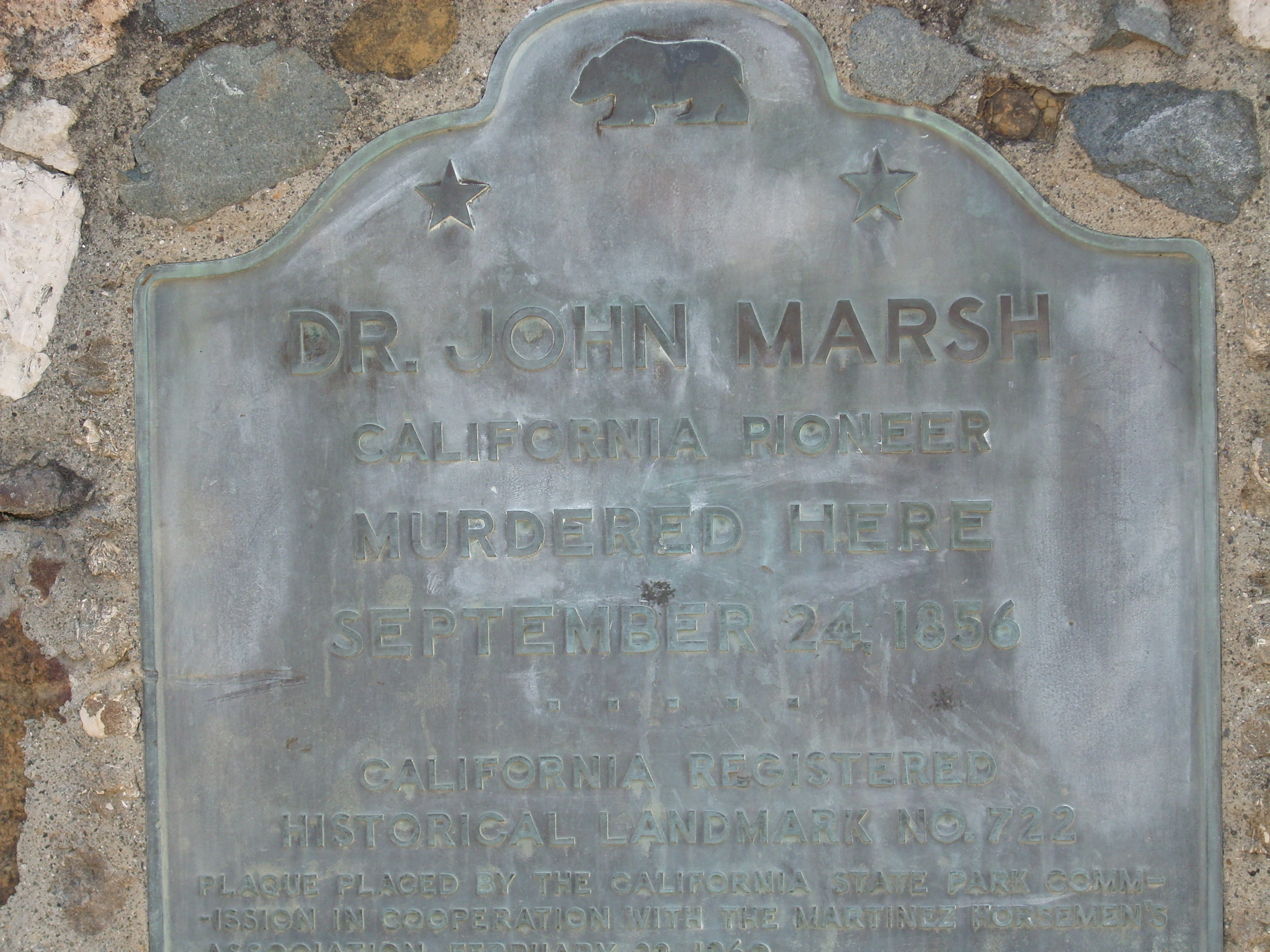
Plaque marking the site of his murder

Marsh was active in California politics. On September 24, 1856, he began a journey from his land in eastern Contra Costa County to San Francisco for a personal or political appointment. On the road between Pacheco and Martinez, he was ambushed and murdered by three of his vaquero employees over a dispute about their wages. Initially the three men escaped. Two of the killers were found ten years later and brought to trial. One man turned state's evidence and was released without trial. The other was convicted and sentenced to life in prison, though he was pardoned 25 years later. The third man was never caught. A California Historical Landmark (#722) plaque marks the site of the murder.

Both Abigail and John Marsh are buried in Mountain View Cemetery, in Oakland, California.

Location monument, Martinez, CA

== Legacy ==
According to local tradition, shortly before Marsh's death, a young man arrived at his house, saying he was seeking shelter from a harsh storm. It was his son Charles, who had journeyed to California in search of his father. They enjoyed a happy, although short-lived reunion. Charles tracked down one of his father's murderers, Felipe Moreno, and brought him to justice.

The orphaned daughter Alice Marsh was entrusted to the care of Mrs. Thompson at Marsh's Landing, not far from present-day Antioch, California. As a young woman, Alice Marsh moved to Oakland, where she married William Walker Camron, one of the builders of the Mt. Diablo toll road. They lived in the Camron-Stanford House, which still stands. They had two daughters, Amy and Gracie; the latter died in infancy.

Camron lost Alice's fortune in some bad real estate transactions. The couple divorced in 1896. Alice never remarried. She and Amy (who remained unmarried) operated a San Francisco boardinghouse, and later moved to Santa Barbara. After their deaths, both women were buried in Mountain View Cemetery in Oakland, as their parents had been.

Marsh Creek, a stream in Contra Costa County, is named for John Marsh.

An elementary school in Antioch, California bears Marsh's name.

A non-profit known as the John Marsh Historic Trust was organized to preserve structures and areas associated with his history in the state.

The California State Route 4 around the cities of Oakley and Brentwood has been named John Marsh Heritage Highway in honor of Dr. Marsh. This portion of SR4 runs from the intersection with SR160 in eastern Antioch to the Marsh Creek/Vasco Road intersection in Brentwood.

== See also ==
- Marsh Creek, California
- Marsh Creek State Park (California)
