= Delta Theater =

Historic movie theater in California, U.S.

- Interactive map of the Delta Theater area
- Alternative names: The Delta

General information
- Type: Movie theater
- Architectural style: Art Deco
- Location: 641 1st Street, Brentwood, California
- Coordinates: 37°55′55″N 121°41′41″W
- Opened: 1938
- Renovated: 2020-2024
- Owner: CineLux Theatres (former operator)

Design and construction
- Architect: L.H. Nishkian

Website
- www.deltatheater.com

The Delta Theater (currently operating as The Delta) is a historic movie theater located in Brentwood, California. The theater screens first-run and second-run films. Since reopening in 2024, the theater has screened G, PG, PG-13, and R films from Warner Bros, Disney, Universal, and Paramount.

== History ==
=== Family ownership (1938-2000) ===
This theatre opened on July 26, 1938 when Chas. E. Petersen opened his then-new Delta Theater. It featured two movies, Three Blind Mice and Prison Farm. In 1955, Clifford and Rose Pierce purchased the Delta Theater from Petersen and remained there until 1979. In 1979, the Delta Theater was sold to Johnny Giannini, and then to Roberto Arteaga.

In the early 1990s, the theater was converted to two screens. The first screen was Theatre #1, which featured a stage and 190 seats. Theatre 2 had 130 seats.

In mid-November 1999, the Delta Theater temporarily closed. Charles Boening, the previous owner of the Brentwood Theater Company disappeared, owing landlords an estimated $140,000 in back rent.

On December 17, 1999, the Delta Theater reopened with a new owner, Dale Davison, as the president and CEO of the Brentwood Theater Company. At that time, the theater screened G, PG, and PG-13 films.

=== Campbell Plaza Theaters/CineLux ownership (2000-2020) ===
In late-August 2000, Paul Gunsky, owner of Campbell Plaza Theaters purchased the Delta Theater from Davison. The plan was for the theater to be closed for four to six weeks for refurbishing. Gunsky planned to renovate the projection systems, including putting in all-digital sound and installing new carpet.

In January 2002, Campbell Plaza Theaters were renamed CineLux Theatres, and the Delta Theater became a part of their broader cinema network. The theater was renamed "The New Delta Cinema, later "CineLux New Delta Cinema", and then "CineLux Delta Cinema Saver" in the mid-2000s. On March 16, 2020, the Delta Theater closed due to the COVID-19 pandemic.

=== Restoration and reopening (2024-present) ===
Later restoration efforts were extensive and aimed at preserving its historical charm while modernizing its facilities. New reclining seats with attached trays were installed, along with upgraded sound and lighting. The iconic marquee, which had been in need of repair since the early 2010s, was restored.

The renovation was led by Sean McCauley with operator Joshua Caudle who aimed to restore the theater as a community hub. McCauley began renovating the theatre in late 2020. The seating capacity was reduced from 320 seats to 164, about 80 per auditorium. New Screens, upgraded Dolby Digital 7.1 Surround Sound was installed in both auditoriums, and a new projector was also acquired.

On June 14, 2024, the Delta Theater was reopened as "The Delta" beginning with Inside Out 2. One day later on June 13, the Delta Theater screened a short film celebrating the city's history. The film was showcased during VIP soft openings, where guests were treated to complimentary popcorn, snacks, and soft drinks before enjoying the newly renovated theater.

== Architecture ==
The theatre was designed in Art Deco style, featuring the iconic neon marquee. The marquee was restored in the late 1990s and again in the early 2020s.
