= East Contra Costa Fire Protection District =

Former American municipal fire department

Operational area
- Country: United States
- State: California
- City: Brentwood
- Section: East Contra Costa County

Agency overview
- Established: November 1, 2002; 23 years ago
- Dissolved: July 1, 2022; 4 years ago
- Fire chief: Brian Helmick
- EMS level: BLS

Facilities and equipment
- Stations: 3
- Engines: 6

Website
- Archived official website at the Wayback Machine (archived 2006-02-02)

East Contra Costa Fire Protection District (ECCFPD) is a former fire department that is responsible for providing fire protection in the most eastern section of Contra Costa County. The district was created on November 1, 2002 by the East Diablo, Oakley, and Bethel Island Fire Protection Districts. It was annexed on July 1, 2022 by CONFIRE.

From 2020, The district has three fire stations with three fire fighters each. Its territory covers 247 square miles and includes two cities, plus much of the county's unincorporated area. The incorporated cities are Brentwood and Oakley. Unincorporated community areas are Bethel Island, Discovery Bay, Byron, Knightsen, and Marsh Creek/Morgan Territory (under contract with CALFIRE).

As of 2020, the district claims to serve a population of 128,000. (Note: ECCFPD reported that as of July 1, 2017, the district had responded to over 7,700 calls per year.) Financial support is primarily from property taxes collected by the county. (Note: Assemblyman Jim Frazier (D-Discovery Bay) said that the county allocation has remained at seven percent of the county property tax receipt since ECCFPD was formed.)

== History ==
=== Pre-merger of fire stations ===
Before the East Contra Costa Fire Protection District was formed in November 2002, the fire protection districts for East Contra Costa was East Diablo Fire Protection District (Brentwood, Byron, Discovery Bay, and Marsh Creek), Oakley Fire Protection District (Oakley and Knightsen), and Bethel Island Fire District (Bethel Island).

==== East Diablo Fire Protection District ====
The district was founded as the Brentwood Fire District in 1928 by local residents who elected Clyde Watson as the very first Fire Chief. With the creation of the Fire District, the first official fire engine was purchased for Brentwood. The Brentwood Fire District had one fire station, Station 91 at 739 1st Street in Brentwood. This station was served as the headquarters for the Fire District. The station was built in 1957. In 1961, Brentwood Fire District bought a 1961 American LaFrance fire truck. In 1968, the district bought a 1968 International Loadstar fire truck from Van Pelt and replaced the 1941 fire truck, numbered "Engine #2".

In 1984, the Brentwood Fire District was merged with Eastern Fire Protection District to create East Diablo Fire Protection District. Following the merger, Brentwood Fire District's Station 91 was re-numbered and became Station 54. Eastern Fire Protection District only has one station, Station 51 at 11851 Marsh Creek Road in the Marsh Creek area since the district was reorganized in 1963.

In December 1991, The district acquired Byron Fire District of Byron, California. Byron Fire District was founded in 1929. It has two fire stations, Station 97 at 3024 1st Street in Byron and Station 98 at 1535 Discovery Bay Blvd in Discovery Bay. The Byron station was built in 1964, while the Discovery Bay station was occupied on September 8, 1980. Following the acquisition, The stations was re-numbered and became Station 57 and 58.

In 2000, the district announced plans for a second fire station in Brentwood. The groundbreaking ceremony was held on December 1, 2000. Also, the district also announced plans for a second fire station in Discovery Bay. Construction at Fire Station 59 was started in 2001, and was finished in 2002. In 2002, East Diablo Fire Protection District has two new stations, Station 52 at 201 John Muir Parkway in Brentwood and Station 59 at 1685 Bixler Road in Discovery Bay. Station 52 was built in 2002 and Station 59 was built in 2002.

==== Oakley Fire Protection District ====
The Oakley Fire Protection District was founded in 1924 after the Oakley Hotel building burned down the same year. With the creation of the Fire District, Anthony Dal Porto was appointed as the first Fire chief, under the direction of the chief businessmen. The district bought a used fire engine in Oakley.

The district had two fire stations, Station 93 at 212 2nd Street in Oakley and Station 94 at 15 A Street in Knightsen. The Oakley station was built in 1963, while the Knightsen station was built in 1964.

In 1971, the district purchased a four-wheel drive fire engine with 600 gallons of water for Station 93. In 1983, Oakley Fire Protection District purchased a 1250 g.p.m. Ford C-9000 diesel engine and a 1,000 g.p.m. International from Van Pelt, both replaced the 1942 and 1949 Chevrolet Fire Engines. The replacements was requested by Chief Joe Tovar in 1982.

On July 1, 1994, the Oakley Fire Protection District was dissolved and became part of the Contra Costa County Fire Protection District. However, the district was recreated and removed from the Contra Costa County Fire Protection District on January 1, 1999. Since the district was recreated from CONFIRE, the district was known as the Oakley-Knightsen Fire Protection District.

==== Bethel Island Fire District ====
The Bethel Island Fire District was founded in 1947. It only had one fire station, Station 95 at 3045 Ranch Lane in Bethel Island. The station was built in 1950.

=== Merger of three fire stations ===
In April 2002, It was announced the East Diablo, Oakley, and Bethel Island fire districts serving East Contra Costa will be merging into one. They were merged into the East Contra Costa Fire Protection District on November 1, 2002, leaving the East Contra Costa Fire Protection District with 8 fire stations. In 2004, Station 51 become Station 16, now owned by CALFIRE under contract with the East Contra Costa Fire Protection District.

=== Station closures and financial difficulties ===
In June 2010, the district announced that it will close two stations, including Station 57 in Byron and 58 in Discovery Bay. The stations closed on July 16, 2010 and the staffing was increased from two to three firefighters.

On August 18, 2011, Fire Station 93 in Oakley was moved from 212 Second Street to 530 O’Hara Avenue. In 2012, the district announced that it will close three stations, including Station 54, 94, and 95.

On August 29, 2012, the district was awarded a federal SAFER Grant that provided funding to reopen two stations. In November 2012, Station 94 was reopened in Knightsen and in May 2013, Station 54 was reopened in Downtown Brentwood. The federal program last for two years, ending on November 18, 2014.

In 2015, The district announced that it will close two fire stations due to financial difficulties. These stations included the temporary Station 54 in Brentwood (which was closed on September 2, 2014) and Station 94 in Knightsen. After the station closures, the three remaining stations will stay to cover a 247-square-mile area.

=== Consolidation with Contra Costa County Fire Protection District ===
In 2020 the district commenced a study to consider consolidation with ConFire. In September 2021, Both Boards of Directors voted to have ConFire annex East Contra Costa Fire District . When approved by Contra Costa County LAFCO, the district assets and personnel will be absorbed by ConFire. The annexation was completed on July 1, 2022, and the stations was transformed to the Contra Costa County Fire Protection District.

After CONFIRE annexed East Contra Costa Fire Protection District, Contra Costa County Fire Protection District announced plans to reopen a fire station in downtown Brentwood that was closed. The old Fire Station 54 building, which was shut down in 2014 was demolished in October 2022 to make way for a two-story building. The new station will be named "Station 94" and will be on the same site as the one demolished in 2022.

In late 2024, district officials announced that the station will open in Fall 2026. On March 21, 2025, the Brentwood Planning Commission postponed its decision on the new Fire Station 94. However, the project was approved by the Brentwood Planning Commission on June 10, 2025.

== Mutual aid agreements ==
Various fire protection districts have mutual aid agreements, but in May 2019 these were modified based on numbers of engines available at the time the aid was summoned. For example, ECCFPD (Battalion 5) covers Brentwood, Oakley, Discovery Bay, Byron, Bethel Island, Knightsen, Morgan Territory while Contra Costa Fire Protection District (CONFIRE) (Battalion 8) normally covers Antioch, Pittsburg and Bay Point.

CONFIRE has 8 engines, and has already said it is willing to send a maximum of four to another district when requested. However, if one or more of its engines are unavailable for any reason, then it will deduct one from the number it will send. In other words, if all eight are unavailable, then CONFIRE will send none to the requesting district. In such a situation the aid will have to be requested from stations farther away (e.g., Central CC: Concord, Martinez or Pleasant Hill or CALFIRE in Rio Vista, Tracy, Stockton or Livermore.

On June 8, 2020, ECCFPD Fire Chief Brian Helmick announced that as of July 1, 2020, the district will only allow its fire fighters to enter burning structures if occupants' lives are at stake. "Otherwise,... you need to do the best you can to fight the fire from the exterior to the interior, but you cannot be aggressive and overextend yourself.” Moreover, only a maximum of three of the department's five fire engines will be sent to a structure fire. This new policy is intended to prevent damage to engines that the department cannot afford to replace.

== Response times ==
Based on national standards, a fire service in an urban or suburban area should have a station located within five miles of any structure. This is based on having the first engine arrive on scene within four minutes of leaving the station. However, ECCFPD's 3-station model cannot meet these criteria because funding is inadequate to build and staff new stations. The Dispatcher normally calls for both an ambulance and a fire truck on the first call. If the ambulance arrives first, the EMS crew can start work on the patient(s) immediately, and if no fire is involved, can cancel the fire truck call, letting it return to the station right away. One member of the fire crew is also a trained EMS person, who can quickly assess the medical issues and even start basic life support procedures and prepare the patient for transport to an emergency room.

== Pension restructuring ==
At the end of August, 2020, Chief Helmick announced that the Contra Costa County Employees Retirement Association had granted permission for his district to disconnect from the larger CCCFPD by paying the pensions of its own employees directly instead of through sharing with the costs of other agencies. He said that this would save his district about $1.2 million per year in retirement costs.

In December 2018, ECCFPD had 24 retirees in the pension plan, while the much larger ConFire had 565 in the plan, resulting in the smaller group subsidizing the larger. ECCFPD will reduce its annual pension cost from $1.17 to $0.79 for every dollar of base pay. The smaller district intends to use the savings to service its own district, rather than continuing its past practice of calling heavily on CONFIRE for aid.

== Stations ==
=== Current ===
Fire Station	Location	City	Opened	Notes
52	201 John Muir Parkway	Brentwood	2001	Originally part of the East Diablo Fire Protection District; Occupied in 2002; Become Station 92 when the district was annexed by CONFIRE
53	530 O’Hara Avenue	Oakley	1963	Originally part of the Oakley Fire Protection District; Located at 212 2nd Street until 2011; This station was the Oakley Fire Protection District headquarters. CCCFPD station from 1994 to 1998; Originally named Station 93 until 2017; Become Station 93 when the district was annexed by CONFIRE
59	1685 Bixler Road	Discovery Bay	2002	Originally part of the East Diablo Fire Protection District; Become Station 99 when the district was annexed by CONFIRE

=== Canceled ===
Fire Station	Location	City	Opened	Notes
55	3200 East Cypress Road	Oakley	2022	Originally part of the Bethel Island Fire District station, then a station of the East Contra Costa Fire Protection District; Originally located at 3045 Ranch Lane, built in 1950; This station was the Bethel Island Fire District headquarters. Closed on July 1, 2012; Reopened at the current location on June 1, 2022; Become Station 95 when the district was annexed by CONFIRE

=== Former ===
Fire Station	Location	City	Opened	Notes
54	739 1st Street	Brentwood	1957	Originally part of the Brentwood Fire District, then the East Diablo Fire Protection District; Originally named Station 91, then Station 54; This station was the Brentwood Fire District headquarters. Closed on September 2, 2014; To be rebuilt and reopened in Fall 2026
94	15 A Street	Knightsen	1964	Originally part of the Oakley Fire Protection District; Closed on September 2, 2014
