= Big Break Regional Shoreline =

Park in California, United States of America

- Interactive map of Big Break Regional Shoreline
- Location: Oakley, Contra Costa County, California.
- Nearest city: Oakley, California
- Coordinates: 38°00′34″N 121°43′44″W
- Created: 2012
- Operator: East Bay Regional Park District
- Open: 5 a.m. – 10 p.m. Visitor center open 10 a.m. – 4 p.m. Wednesday - Sunday.

Big Break Regional Shoreline is a 1,648 acre regional park in Oakley, Contra Costa County, northern California. It is a part of the East Bay Regional Park District system and opened in 2005.

== Delta Visitor Center ==
The park features an $11 million, 5,000-square-foot Delta Visitor Center, which operates as a natural history museum, science laboratory, and staging area for paddling and hiking trips along the Sacramento–San Joaquin River Delta. The new visitor center opened in October 2012.

The center includes a 1,200 square feet (110 m^{2}) interactive map of the Sacramento–San Joaquin River Delta that shows visitors how water flows through the region. A 30-by-50 model of the delta is also located at the park, as well as restored wetlands.

== Park name ==
The park is named for a break in the levee system that flooded an asparagus farm between the San Joaquin River and Dutch Slough in 1928. The break formed a small bay along the river, near the area where fresh water from the river mixes with salt water from San Francisco Bay.

== Wildlife ==
According to the East Bay Regional Parks District, Big Break Regional Shoreline provides habitat for at least 70 species of birds and several species of mammals. They include:

- Birds include black rail, northern harrier, white-tailed kite, yellow-breasted chat, great blue heron, great egret, snowy egret, green heron, white-faced ibis coot, mallards, black-crowned night heron, common yellowthroat, and kingfisher
- Mammals include beavers, muskrats, river otters and American mink.
- Reptiles include giant garter snake, common water snakes, and western pond turtles, a California Species of Special Concern.
- Fish include chinook salmon, striped bass, largemouth bass, bluegill, white sturgeon, and fathead minnow.
- Plants include willow, tule, cattail, Brazilian waterweed, water primrose, cottonwood, yerba mansa, and salicornia.

== Activities ==
- The Delta Discovery Experience includes covered outdoor educational areas for explaining the ecosystems and wildlife of the Delta region.
- The park offers shaded picnic areas and a small amphitheater.
- Fishing is a popular recreational activity. A 100 feet (30 m)-long fishing pier extends into the river from the park. Off-shore fishing is also popular. The chief varieties of fish include largemouth bass, striped bass, white catfish, bluegill, sunfish and sturgeon. Fishermen must have a California fishing license.
- A beach launch is available for kayaks, canoes, and paddle boards.
- Big Break is a terminus for Big Break Regional Trail and Marsh Creek Regional Trail.
- The visitor center offers craft activities and programs every weekend.
- The park has a small rough trail, Levee Top Trail, that features owl boxes, beaver lodges, and otter slides.

== Accessibility ==
The park is open daily from sunrise to sunset. The Visitor Center is open Wednesday-Sunday, 10 a.m. to 4 p.m. The park is at 69 Big Break Road in Oakley. It can be reached by private vehicles from Main Street, and there is no fee for parking or admission. Tri Delta Transit #300 provides access to the park through Vintage Parkway and Big Break Road on weekdays. The park is generally wheelchair accessible.

Dogs are permitted, except in marsh and wetland habitats in the park.

== See also ==
- Parks in Contra Costa County, California
