= The Streets of Brentwood =

Shopping mall in Brentwood, California, U.S.

- AMC Brentwood 14
- Location: Brentwood, California, United States
- Coordinates: 37.9442068°N 121.7431091°W
- Address: 2455 Sand Creek Road
- Opened: 2008
- Developer: Continental Retail Development
- Manager: Heitman
- Owner: CenterCal Properties, LLC
- Num. of stores: 64
- Num. of anchor tenants: 5
- Floor area: 358,700 sq ft (33,324.3 m^{2})
- Floors: 1
- Website: www.shopstreetsofbrentwood.com

The Streets of Brentwood is an open-air, lifestyle center in Brentwood, California, United States. It was opened in October 2008. The center features a 14-screen movie theater operated by AMC Theatres, a Sprouts Farmers Market grocery store, and a Barnes & Noble bookstore. The center is also anchored by DSW and Ulta Beauty.

== History ==
The center was developed by dk Engineering and Continental Retail Development in 2006. The project near Sand Creek Road costs $125 million. The center's initial phase is totaled 313,000 square feet (29,078.7 m^{2}). A second phase of 100,000 square feet (9,290.3 m^{2}) was slated for the complex, creating a total of 460,000 square feet (42,735.4 m^{2}). Construction of this project started in July 2007.

The center officially opened on October 24, 2008 with Rave Motion Pictures Brentwood 14, DSW, and REI. However, due to the 2008 recession, the REI store did not open until February 2009.

On January 17, 2013, AMC Theatres purchased Rave Cinemas Brentwood 14 along with five other theatres from Rave Cinemas. DSW is currently the last original anchor operating at the center since REI closed in February 2014.

In 2018, Fairborne Properties purchased The Streets of Brentwood for $85.75 million. CenterCal is currently the owner of the center since 2024.

In January 2025, Barnes & Noble opened in the former REI, relocating from a prior location in nearby Antioch.

== Anchors ==
- AMC Brentwood 14 – 14-screen movie theater; opened 2008 as Rave Motion Pictures
- Barnes & Noble – opened 2025
- DSW – opened 2008
- Sprouts Farmers Market – opened 2016
- Ulta Beauty
