= John Muir Health =

- Nonprofit

Geography
- Location: Contra Costa County, CA, United States

Organization
- Affiliated university: UCSF Medical Center, Stanford University
- Network: John Muir Health Physician Network

Services
- Emergency department: Level II trauma center
- Beds: 817

Helipads
- Helipad: Yes

History
- Founded: 1997

Links
- Website: www.johnmuirhealth.com
- Lists: Hospitals in the United States

John Muir Health is a hospital network headquartered in Walnut Creek, California and serving Contra Costa County, California and surrounding communities (all considered suburbs of Oakland and San Francisco). It was formed in 1997 from the merger of John Muir Medical Center (based in Walnut Creek) and Mount Diablo Medical Center (based in neighboring Concord).

John Muir Health includes two of the largest medical centers in Contra Costa County: John Muir Medical Center, Walnut Creek, a medical center that serves as Contra Costa County's only designated trauma center; and John Muir Medical Center, Concord. Together, they provide services in neurosciences, orthopedics, cancer care, cardiovascular care and high-risk obstetrics. Other areas of specialty include general surgery, robotic surgery, weight loss surgery, rehabilitation and critical care. Both hospitals are accredited by The Joint Commission, a national surveyor of quality patient care.

John Muir Health also offers complete inpatient and outpatient behavioral health programs and services at its Behavioral Health Center, a fully accredited, 73-bed psychiatric hospital located in Concord.

Since its inception in 1996, the John Muir Physician Network has become one of the largest physician networks in Northern California, with more than 900 primary care and specialty physicians. Physicians associated with the Physician Network belong to either John Muir Medical Group (JMMG) or Muir Medical Group IPA, Inc. The Physician Network owns and operates primary care practices staffed by JMMG physicians in 23 locations from Brentwood to Pleasanton.

In addition, John Muir Health provides outpatient services throughout the community and urgent care centers in Brentwood, Concord, San Ramon and Walnut Creek.

== John Muir Medical Center, Walnut Creek ==
John Muir Medical Center, Walnut Creek is a 554-bed acute care facility that is designated as a level II trauma center, the only trauma center for Contra Costa County and portions of Solano County. Recognized as one of the region's premier health care providers, its areas of specialty include high- and low-risk obstetrics, orthopedics, rehabilitation, neurosciences, cardiac care, and cancer care. In spring 2011, The Tom and Billie Long Patient Care Tower, with 230 private rooms opened. Key areas of expansion include emergency, trauma, imaging, lab, surgery, critical care, neonatal intensive care unit, birth center, orthopedics and rehabilitation.

== John Muir Medical Center, Concord ==
John Muir Medical Center, Concord, is a 244-bed acute care facility that serves Contra Costa and southern Solano counties. The medical center is a center for cancer care and cardiovascular care, including open heart surgery and interventional cardiology. Other areas of specialty include general surgery, orthopedic and neurology programs, and behavioral health services at the respective facility located at 2740 Grant Street. In November 2010, The Hofmann Family Patient Care Tower opened, housing private patient rooms, a centralized cardiovascular institute and a new emergency department.

On July 28, 2011, Becker's Hospital Review listed John Muir Medical Center, Concord under 60 Hospitals With Great Orthopedic Programs. The hospital's orthopedic department includes joint replacement, extremity care, spinal surgery and sports medicine. The hospital's spine surgeons perform operations for patients who need surgical intervention.

== History ==
The John Muir Medical Center in Walnut Creek opened in 1965 after the efforts of several local doctors, who received financing in part from a Hill–Burton Act grant. During the planning of the Walnut Creek Medical Center in the late 1950s, the name “John Muir” was chosen via a local school naming contest. In 2020, following public scrutiny of John Muir’s historical views, John Muir Health stated it would examine the legacy of the name and appointed a study group to make recommendations.

Concord Hospital was established in 1930, in a modest one-story home at 2334 Almond Avenue (which exists to this day and is used as a private residence). Concord Hospital was founded by Edna Haywood, a nurse; the facility would expand into a two-story hospital. In 1972, further expansion led to the creation and construction of Mount Diablo Hospital/Medical Center.

In 1997, John Muir Medical Center merged with Mt. Diablo Medical Center, based in neighboring Concord, to form the John Muir/Mt. Diablo Health Network. Because Mt. Diablo was a publicly run facility, residents of the Mt. Diablo service area needed to approve the merger by popular vote, which they did in 1996. In 2005, the system adopted its current name to further define itself as one common healthcare system.

== Lawsuit ==
On January 13, 2022, John Muir Health was sued by Dr. Alicia Kalamas who alleged that institutional failures led to the death of a child and several adult patients. She alleged that profit motives interfered with patient care decisions. The hospital denied wrongdoing and stated that patient safety was a top priority.

On April 7, 2022, the San Francisco Chronicle ran an 8 ½ page article exposing how John Muir's Walnut Creek hospital performed a complex surgery on a child, Ailee Jong, despite being warned that they lacked the ability to safely perform the surgery. The article detailed how John Muir Health entered into a branding arrangement with Stanford Health but actually lacked the skills offered at Stanford's facilities. The parents then chose John Muir Medical Center thinking they were obtaining the same care as they would have received at Stanford. The child died on the operating table.

John Muir Health responded to the article stating that the surgery was properly performed and that the child was frail and could have died even under optimal circumstances. On April 15, 2022, the Medical Board of California launched an investigation of John Muir and its doctors relating to the death of Ailee Jong.

== See also ==
- List of hospitals in California
