= Contra Costa County Fire Protection District =

American municipal fire department

Operational area
- Country: United States
- State: California
- City: Concord
- Section: Contra Costa County
- Address: 4005 Port Chicago Highway

Agency overview
- Established: December 29, 1964; 61 years ago
- Fire chief: Lewis T. Broschard III
- EMS level: ALS

Facilities and equipment
- Battalions: 5
- Stations: 32
- Engines: 45+
- Trucks: 7
- Quints: 1

Website
- www.cccfpd.org

Contra Costa County Fire Protection District (CCCFPD) is a fire department that is responsible for providing fire protection in Contra Costa County. The district was created on December 29, 1964 by the Central and Mt. Diablo Fire Protection Districts.

Since the 2022 annexation of East Contra Costa Fire Protection District, the district has three fire stations in East County with three fire fighters each. Its territory covers 247 square miles and includes two cities, plus much of the county's unincorporated area. The incorporated cities are Brentwood and Oakley. Unincorporated community areas are Discovery Bay, Byron, Knightsen, and Bethel Island.

As of 2025, the district claims that it serves a population of over 1,000,000. Financial support is primarily from property taxes collected by the county. The district announced it will build two new fire stations in Brentwood.

== History ==
On July 1, 1994, the Contra Costa County Fire Protection District annexed four districts serving Contra Costa County. These fire districts included the Riverview Fire District, the Oakley Fire Protection District, West County Fire District, and the Pinole Fire District.

In 2020 the district commenced a study to consider consolidation with ECCFPD. In September 2021, Both Boards of Directors voted to have ConFire annex East Contra Costa Fire District. When approved by Contra Costa County LAFCO, the district assets and personnel will be absorbed by ConFire. The annexation of East Contra Costa Fire Protection District was completed on July 1, 2022, and the stations was transformed to the district.

After CONFIRE annexed East Contra Costa Fire Protection District, Contra Costa County Fire Protection District announced plans to reopen a fire station in downtown Brentwood that was closed. The old Fire Station 54 building, which was shut down in 2014 was demolished in October 2022 to make way for a two-story building. The new station will be named "Station 94" and will be on the same site as the one demolished in 2022.

In late 2024, district officials announced that the station will open in Fall 2026. On March 21, 2025, the Brentwood Planning Commission postponed its decision on the new Fire Station 94. However, the project was approved by the Brentwood Planning Commission on June 10, 2025.
