= J. Douglas Adams =

American superintendent (1949–2026)

- Adams in 2007
- Born: December 19, 1949; Pleasanton, California, U.S.
- Died: May 22, 2026 (aged 76); Pleasanton, California, U.S.
- Education: Liberty Union High School
- Years active: 1991–2007
- Known for: Superintendent of Brentwood Union School District
- Family: Jeanne Adams (mother; 1921–2010); Jack Adams (father; 1921–2026)

J. Douglas Adams (December 19, 1949 – May 22, 2026) was an American superintendent of Brentwood Union School District from 1991 to 2007. He was known to be honored when Adams Middle School was dedicated by the district in 2006.

== Life ==
Adams was born on December 19, 1949, in Pleasanton, California. He was raised in Brentwood and attended Brentwood Elementary School, Edna Hill Middle School, and Liberty Union High School before dedicating his career to local students.

Adams returned to his hometown in 1991 to serve as the Superintendent of the Brentwood Union School District, replacing Bill Bristow. During his tenure, he oversaw massive growth, expanding the district from three schools with 1,400 students in 1991 to ten schools serving over 8,000 students in 2007.

In September 2006, Brentwood USD formally dedicated the state-of-the-art Adams Middle School campus, which was named after the superintendent Adamsg. This was Brentwood's third middle school that was opened in late July of the same year.

In January 2007, Adams announced his retirement at Brentwood USD after serving for 16 years as a superintendent. He was replaced by Merrill Grant on July 1 of the year. He had surgery on the first day of school in 2007.

On February 28, 2013, Adams was returned as an acting superintendent of BUSD to replace Merrill Grant, which was fired by the school district due to a child-abuse case. Then, he got replaced again in May 2013 by Dana Eaton, which was the current superintendent.

Adams died on May 22, 2026, at the age of 76, in Pleasanton, California.
