= Brentwood Union School District =

School district in California, United States

Address
- 255 Guthrie Lane Brentwood, California, 94513; United States
- Coordinates: 37°55′22″N 121°40′56″W

District information
- Type: Public
- Grades: K–8
- Established: 1878
- Superintendent: Dana Eaton
- Schools: 9 elementary (K–5); 3 middle (6–8)
- NCES District ID: 0605910

Students and staff
- Students: 9,751
- Teachers: 403.13 (FTE)
- Staff: 399.67 (FTE)
- Student–teacher ratio: 24.19:1

Other information
- Website: www.brentwood.k12.ca.us

Brentwood Union School District is a public school district based in Contra Costa County, California. The district serves approximately 9700 students from grades K–8.

It includes almost all of Brentwood and portions of Antioch and Oakley.

It feeds into Liberty Union High School District.

== History ==
The district was founded in 1878 when they opened Brentwood Grammar School, originally a one-room school. In 1887, they added another room. In 1924, the school was moved to 929 2nd Street, where the Liberty Adult Education is currently used. In 1943, the district annexed the Liberty Elementary School District.

In 1991, J. Douglas Adams replaced Bill Bristow as the district's superintendent. In 1997, the Brentwood Elementary School moved to its current location at 200 Griffith Lane. On July 1, 2007, Merrill Grant replaced J. Douglas Adams as the district's superintendent, which was announced his retirement in January of that year.

On May 8, 2013, the district announced its new superintendent, Dana Eaton, which replaced J. Douglas Adams, who temporary replaced Merrill Grant following a child-abuse case.

The current superintendent is Dana Eaton, which was worked as a principal at Pioneer since its opening. Notable superintendents include William B. Bristow from 1966 to 1991, J. Douglas Adams from 1991 to 2007, and Merrill Grant from 2007 to 2013.

== Schools ==
=== Elementary schools ===
- Brentwood Elementary School (200 Griffith Lane)
- Garin Elementary School (250 1st Street)
- Isaac R. Montañez School (2340 Smith Road) named after Issac R. Montanez, opened in 2024
- Krey Elementary School (190 Crawford Drive)
- Loma Vista Elementary School (2110 San Jose Ave)
- Marsh Creek Elementary School (601 Grant Street)
- Mary Casey Black Elementary School (480 Farmington Rd) named after Mary Casey Black, opened in 2013
- Pioneer Elementary School (2010 Shady Willow Lane)
- Ron Nunn Elementary School (1755 Central Ave)

=== Middle schools ===
- Adams Middle School (401 American Avenue) named after J. Douglas Adams, built in 2006
- Bristow Middle School (140 Birch Street) named after William B. Bristow, built in 1995
- Edna Hill Middle School (855 Minnesota Ave) named after Edna Hill in 1955, designated as a California Distinguished School in 2007
