= Brentwood, California =

City in California, United States

- City
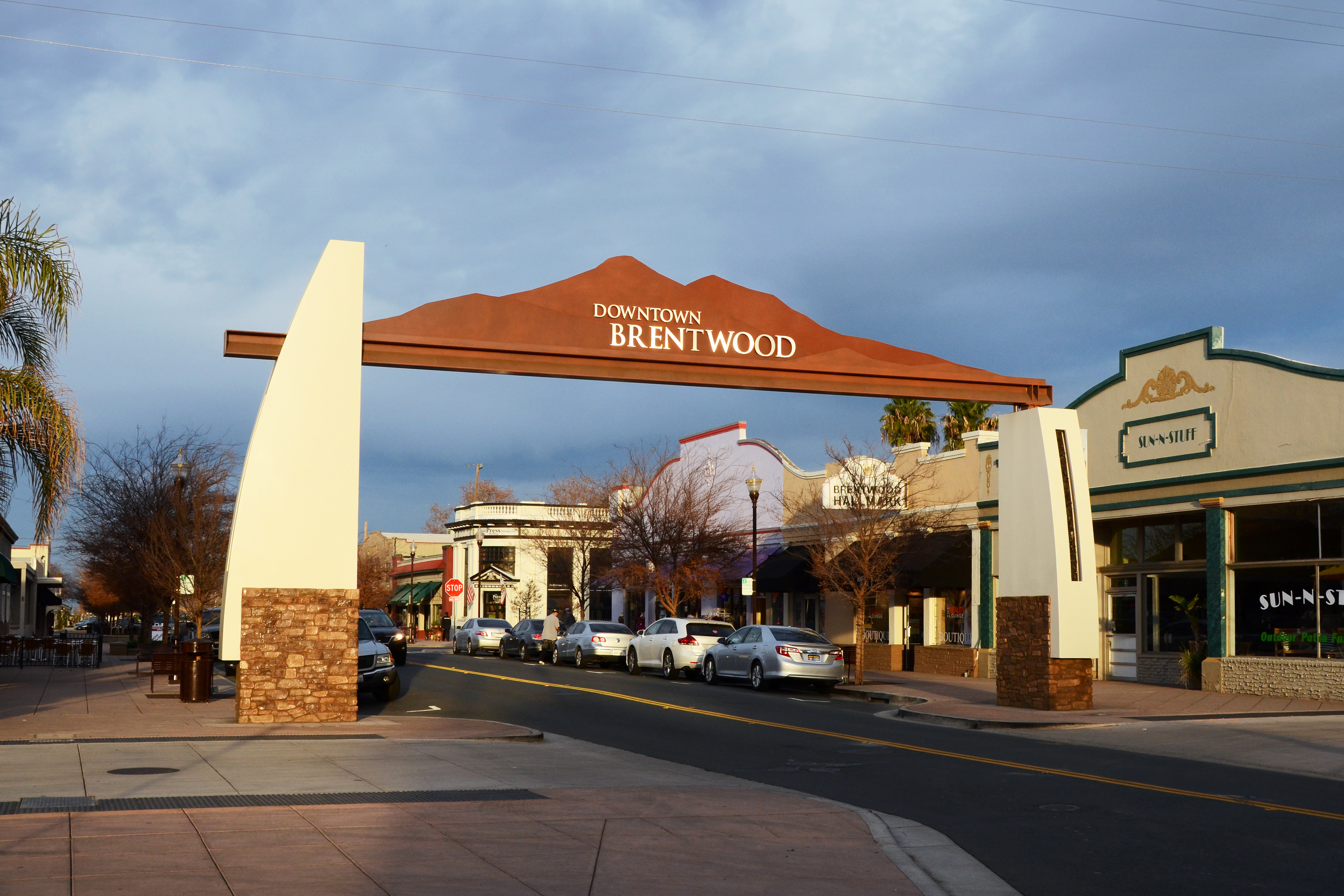
- Gateway to downtown Brentwood

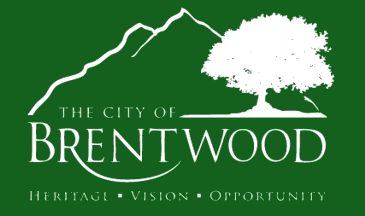
- Flag Logo (Note: Whilst the background is black in the Brentwood City logo, the actual logo's background is white.)
- Interactive map of Brentwood, California
- Location in the United States
- Coordinates: 37°55′55″N 121°41′45″W
- Country: United States
- State: California
- County: Contra Costa
- Incorporated: January 21, 1948
- Named for: Brentwood, Essex, England

Government
  - Mayor: Susannah Meyer
  - State Senator: Christopher Cabaldon (D)
  - State Assembly: Anamarie Avila Farias (D)
  - U. S. Congress: Mark DeSaulnier (D)

Area
  - Total: 14.86 sq mi (38.50 km^{2})
  - Land: 14.86 sq mi (38.50 km^{2})
  - Water: 0 sq mi (0.00 km^{2}) 0.13%
- Elevation: 79 ft (24 m)

Population (2020)
  - Total: 64,292
  - Estimate (2024): 65,350
  - Density: 4,394.4/sq mi (1,696.67/km^{2})
- Time zone: UTC-8 (PST)
  - Summer (DST): UTC-7 (PDT)
- ZIP code: 94513
- Area code: 925
- FIPS code: 06-08142
- GNIS feature IDs: 277479, 2409902
- Website: www.brentwoodca.gov

Brentwood is a city in Contra Costa County, California, United States. It is located near the East Bay region of the San Francisco Bay Area. The population is 66,854 as of 2022, an increase of 287% from 23,302 at the 2000 census.

Brentwood was settled by Euro-Americans in the late 19th century. The community is still known throughout the Bay Area for its agricultural products - primarily its cherries, corn and peaches. Due to urban sprawl, many of the old farms and orchards have been replaced by suburban properties and developments since 1990. Brentwood is increasingly residential, with the rate of population growth in the triple digits during the 1990s, and 69% from 2000 through 2010. As of currently, estimates put the population at around 65,350; a 26.5% increase from 2010.

== History ==
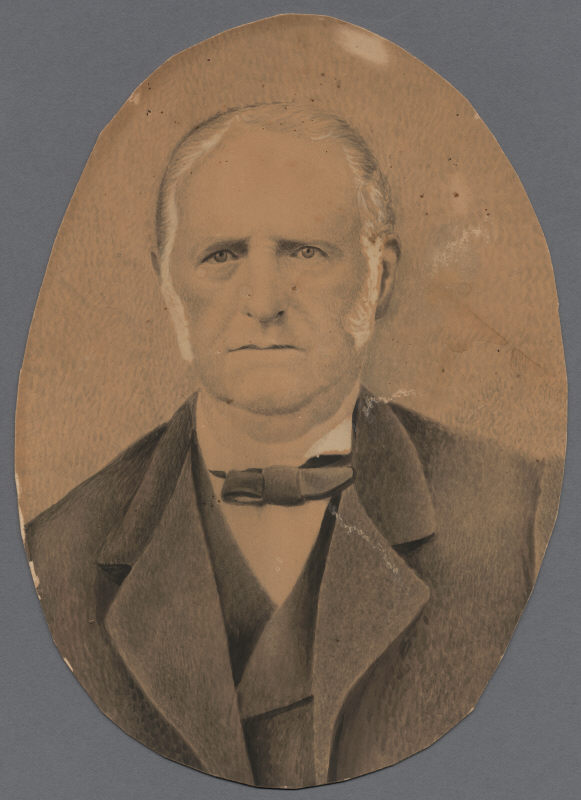
Don José Noriega, a wealthy Californio ranchero, was granted Rancho Los Méganos in 1835, covering all of modern Brentwood.

Brentwood was originally laid out on land donated from property owned by John Marsh, an East Contra Costa County pioneer who acquired Rancho Los Méganos, the land grant that Brentwood is built upon, in 1837 from Jose Noriega. Marsh was one of the wealthiest men in California and was instrumental in its becoming independent from Mexico and part of the United States. His letters extolling the potential for agriculture in California were published in newspapers throughout the East. They resulted in the first wagon trains to California. Marsh encouraged this, and allowed new arrivals to stay on his ranch until they could get settled. Rancho Los Méganos became the terminus of the California Trail. Brentwood was named after Marsh's ancestral home, the town of Brentwood in the County of Essex, England.

Brentwood's first post office was established in 1878. The city incorporated in 1948.

Balfour, Guthrie & Co., a British investment company, purchased the John Marsh ranch in 1910. The company invested heavily in other California agricultural properties as well. In 1910, it built the Brentwood Hotel at Oak Street and Brentwood Boulevard, across from the railroad station. This replaced an earlier hotel on the same site that had burned down in 1903. The hotel was razed in 1967, and replaced by a service station.

Original Brentwood water tower

The Brentwood water tower perhaps symbolizes the city's transition from a rural farm community to a modern bedroom community. This landmark on Walnut Boulevard, across the street from the Brentwood Park and Ride lot, is the tallest structure in the city. It is no longer used for its original purpose, but now serves as a cell phone tower. City water is stored in large tanks atop hills outside the city.

The city is bordered on three sides by the Contra Costa County Agricultural Core which consists of 11,000 acres of preserved and still actively productive farm land.

During the mid-2000s, many retail stores were built along the Brentwood/Antioch border on Lone Tree Way, on both sides of SR 4, about 3.5 miles (5.6 km) from downtown Brentwood. This includes Lone Tree Plaza (includes The Home Depot), which was opened in 2004. The Streets of Brentwood, an outdoor lifestyle retail center, along Sand Creek Rd opened in 2008.

The city broke ground for a new civic center in November 2009. The Mission-style architectural inspiration for City Hall, the main building, was the 1910 Brentwood Hotel. The $60 million project, completed in May 2012, includes the 58,000-square-foot City Hall and state-of-the-art City Council Chambers, a 32,000-square-foot community center, 280-space parking garage and redevelopment of the 1/2-acre City Park. The community center also includes arts and crafts rooms as well as studios for dance classes and community exercise programs. The center received a Leadership in Energy and Environmental Design silver certification for amenities such as green roofs, biosales, permeable paving and infiltration planters. City departments began moving into the new facility in October 2011, and the former city hall was demolished during November 2011.

== Indigenous history ==
Brentwood was home to the Julpuns who settled mainly in the upper corner of the East Bay. The Julpun were Native Americans who were a part of the Bay Miwok tribes who spoke the same language in an area, which is a branch of the Eastern Miwok Language. The Bay Miwok tribes would generally include 50–200 people in each village, where they would build their villages along the creeks since they were filled with fish. The Julpun believed that everything in the world had a life or spirit and were very in tune with the nature around them. They set things as sacred where they would pray at as part of their religious beliefs, they ended up coining Mt. Diablo, or as they call it Supremenenu, as the birthplace of the world. Due to this, they would hold the top points of Mt. Diablo to be used for sacred gatherings or religious purposes.

Back then the Julpun were never reached out to by ethnographers or linguists when the Julpun still retained their language, the Bay Miwok. They weren't mainly concentrated but spread out from the San Joaquin River to the bottom part of Marsh Creek which is now the southern part of Brentwood. Between 1806 and 1808 few of the Julpun migrated over to Mission San Jose with about 100 or so went by 1813. Later on Milliken listed down that about 141 Julpun members were baptized by 1819 from Mission San Jose. As time went on, Mission San Jose converted from religious beliefs and values to secular institutions where the Julpun members ended up leaving in 1836 back to their original territory. John Marsh ended up acquiring Rancho Los Meganos from Jose Noriega in 1837 which would cover modern Brentwood and back then cover the Julpuns territory. However, due to Mission San Jose revoking the spiritual possession it once had, the Julpuns may have gone back to their territory and ended up working under John Marsh on the land where their home once was.

In present time the Julpun tribe have more or less settled around the Bay Area. Some are living in specific groups, while others are living in society where they are preserving their native culture even though they may be away from their tribes. They (the Julpun) are working with the National Park Service, where they united under one federally recognized tribe called the Federated Indians of Graton Rancheria.

== Geography ==
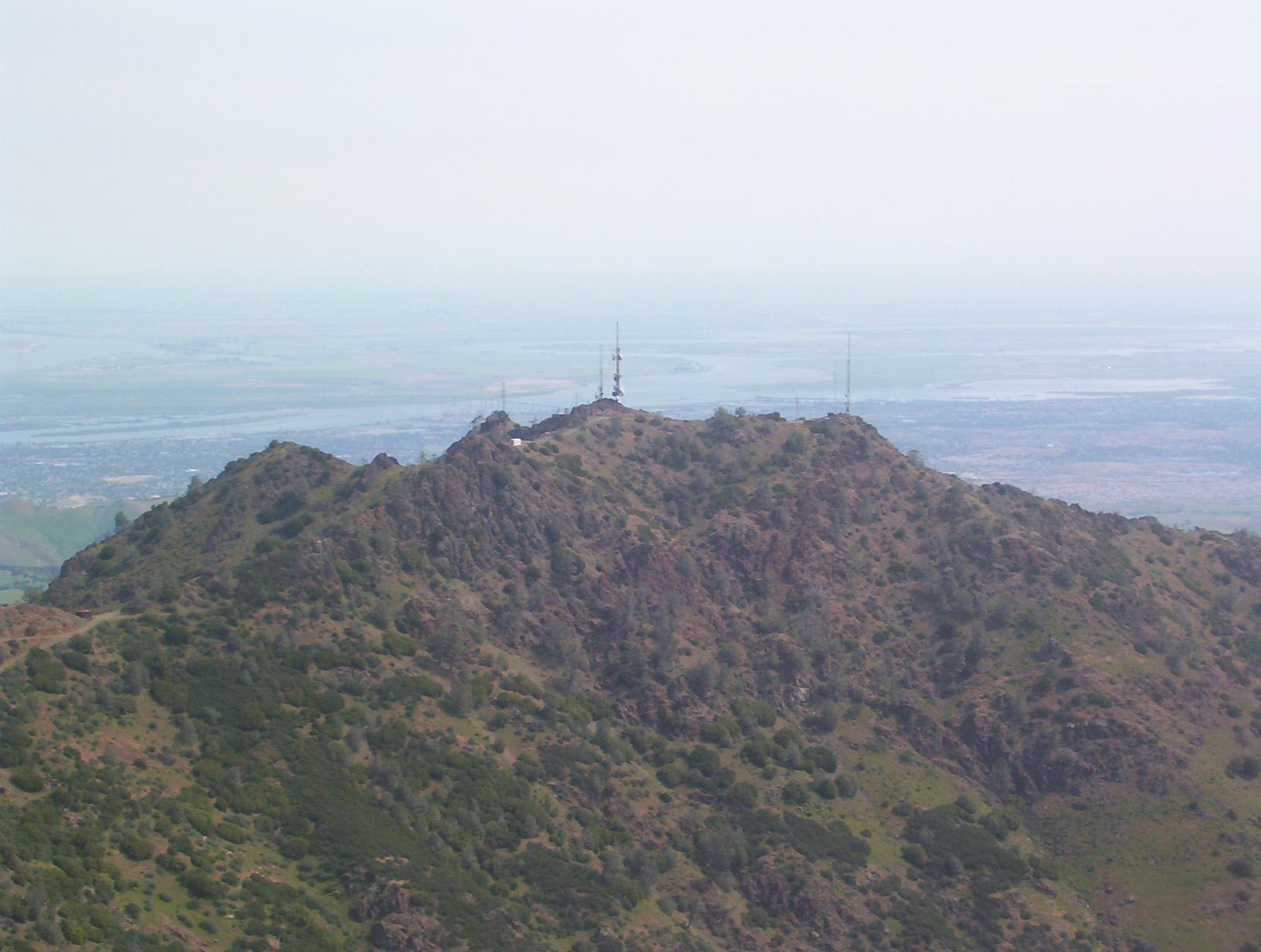
Photo of Mount Diablo, showing Brentwood behind the mountain and to the right.

As is common with many East Bay towns in Contra Costa County, Mount Diablo is clearly seen from Brentwood. Brentwood is located on the alluvial plain of the Sacramento-San Joaquin Delta. In the picture shown at right, Brentwood lies center right and the city of Antioch lies center left. North Peak appears in the foreground between the two cities and largely hides the city of Oakley.

The East Bay Regional Park District is a special San Francisco Bay Area district operating in the East Bay counties of Alameda and Contra Costa. East Bay Regional Park District trails and parks are found in Brentwood.

Brentwood has a total area of 14.81 sq mi (38.4 km^{2}), of which 14.79 sq mi (38.3 km^{2}) is land and 0.02 sq mi (0.05 km^{2}) or 0.13% is water. The landscape on the west is marked by rolling hills, non-native grasses, oak trees, fruit orchards, and vineyards, with a number of public golf courses.

=== Climate ===
Brentwood borders on the Mediterranean climate (Csa) and Semi-arid climates (Bsh). Like most of East Contra Costa County, Brentwood lies in the rain shadow of Mt. Diablo and receives less rainfall than many of its neighbors. The wet season is generally October through April, though there may be a day or two of light rainfall in June or September. Summer heat is often moderated by the Delta breeze, especially in the late afternoon, causing temperatures to cool rapidly.

Climate data for Brentwood, California
Month	Jan	Feb	Mar	Apr	May	Jun	Jul	Aug	Sep	Oct	Nov	Dec	Year
Record high °F (°C)	77 (25)	80 (27)	90 (32)	96 (36)	103 (39)	117 (47)	114 (46)	110 (43)	115 (46)	103 (39)	88 (31)	75 (24)	117 (47)
Mean daily maximum °F (°C)	54 (12)	60 (16)	66 (19)	71 (22)	79 (26)	86 (30)	92 (33)	90 (32)	86 (30)	77 (25)	64 (18)	55 (13)	73 (23)
Mean daily minimum °F (°C)	39 (4)	43 (6)	45 (7)	48 (9)	54 (12)	58 (14)	59 (15)	59 (15)	57 (14)	52 (11)	45 (7)	39 (4)	50 (10)
Record low °F (°C)	20 (−7)	22 (−6)	27 (−3)	28 (−2)	37 (3)	38 (3)	43 (6)	45 (7)	42 (6)	28 (−2)	24 (−4)	18 (−8)	18 (−8)
Average precipitation inches (mm)	2.66 (68)	2.43 (62)	2.08 (53)	.78 (20)	.43 (11)	.09 (2.3)	0 (0)	.02 (0.51)	.18 (4.6)	.62 (16)	1.60 (41)	2.41 (61)	13.3 (339.41)

== Government ==
The City of Brentwood operates under the City Manager form of government. Under policy direction of the City Council, the City Manager serves as the Chief Administrative Officer of the city; assumes full responsibility for planning, administering, directing, overseeing, and evaluating the activities and operations of all City departments. The following city departments report directly to the manager:

- City Attorney
- City Manager
- Community Development
- Engineering
- Finance and Information Systems
- Human Resources (HR)
- Parks and Recreation
- Brentwood Police Department (BFD)
- Public Works

=== Brentwood City Council Seats ===
The Mayor of Brentwood is Susannah Meyer, the former Vice-Mayor; the current Vice-Mayor is Pa'tanisha Pierson (D2). (Note: The "D_" is representing "District_".) The rest of the Brentwood City Council seats are fill by Faye Maloney (D1), Jovita Mendoza (D3), and Tony Oerlemans (D4).

=== Brentwood Police Department (BPD) ===
Brentwood established its own City Police Department in 1948, when it was primarily a small agricultural community. The first police vehicles was the Ford cars, purchased from Brentwood Motors (now Bill Brandt Ford). Today, it serves an area of 14 square miles (36 km^{2}), divided into four geographic areas. The police department's current fleet included the Ford Police Interceptor Utility vehicles, motorcycles, and an Emergency Rescue Vehicle.

The Brentwood Police Department was located at 9100 Brentwood Blvd beginning in 2005. Tim Herbert is the current police chief, appointed in Sept 2022.

=== Fire Protection ===
Fire protection is provided by the Contra Costa County Fire Protection District (CCCFPD), who annexed East Contra Costa Fire Protection District (ECCFPD) in 2022. This district reports to the Contra Costa County Board of Supervisors. Resources are shared with the communities of Oakley, Bethel Island, Knightsen, Byron and Discovery Bay. It also covers certain unincorporated areas of the county. The fire district was headquartered in the Brentwood City Hall building. Prior to the East Contra Costa Fire Protection District, Brentwood was served by the East Diablo Fire Protection District from 1984 to 2002. Prior to this, the Brentwood Fire Protection District from 1928 to 1984 protected the area.

The fire district had to close two fire stations in 2015 because of funding issues. This has left only three stations to cover an area of 249 square miles. One station remains open in Brentwood, Oakley, and Discovery Bay.

=== Delta Patrol Station ===
The Delta Patrol Station, a unit of the Contra Costa County Sheriff's office has signed an agreement with the City of Brentwood to move its existing office from Oakley to a larger space in Brentwood. The Delta Patrol Station has occupied a 1920s era building for over four decades, and has been looking for a larger facility in East County to serve the growing population for faster response in unincorporated Contra Costa County areas (e.g., Byron, Discovery Bay and Knightsen). Response time for Bethel Island is expected to remain the same.

== Education ==
=== Public schools ===
Almost all of the city is in the Brentwood Union School District (BUSD), while a small portion is in Knightsen Elementary School District. All of it is in Liberty Union High School District (LUHSD).

BUSD and LUHSD combined have nine elementary (plus one digital academy), three middle (Bristow Middle School, Edna Hill Middle School, and Adams Middle School), and four high schools (Independence High School, Liberty High School, La Paloma High School, and Heritage High School).

The Brentwood Union School District runs on a modified traditional school calendar. The Brentwood Union School District has many schools designated as a California Distinguished School. Approximately five percent of California schools are awarded this honor.

=== Community college ===
Los Medanos College began operating a satellite facility (Brentwood Center) at 101 Sand Creek Road in the city. The existing center has outgrown its limited space in a former Lucky grocery store, where it has no room for expansion. The Brentwood Center acquired property in the southwest part of the city, where it plans built a new 18 acres (7.3 ha) campus that opened in 2021.

=== Public library ===
The temporary Brentwood branch of the Contra Costa County Library, located at 104 Oak Street, across from the Civic Center and City Park, was razed early in 2017, along with two other city-owned buildings at 118 and 120 Oak Street to be replaced by the long-awaited new Brentwood branch library. The Brentwood City Council approved the design for the new 20,000 square feet (1,900 m^{2}) facility in September 2016. The facility was completed in 2018, and serves a population of more than 50,000. The library collection includes materials in both Spanish and English. It also offers a wide variety of media, including DVDs, CDs, and audiobooks, as well as a large print collection. The library offers a number of programs for all ages, including storytimes for babies and toddlers.

== Demographics ==
Historical population
Census	Pop.	Note	%±
1950	1,729		—
1960	2,186		26.4%
1970	2,649		21.2%
1980	4,434		67.4%
1990	7,563		70.6%
2000	23,302		208.1%
2010	51,481		120.9%
2020	64,292		24.9%
2024 (est.)	65,350	▲	1.6%
U.S. Decennial Census

Brentwood first appeared as a city in the 1950 U.S. census following the city's incorporation in 1948.

=== 2020 census ===
As of the 2020 census, Brentwood had a population of 64,292. The population density was 4,325.1 inhabitants per square mile (1,669.9/km^{2}). The Census reported that 99.8% of residents lived in households, 0.2% lived in non-institutionalized group quarters, and 0.0% were institutionalized. 100.0% of residents lived in urban areas, while 0.0% lived in rural areas.

The median age was 39.3 years. 26.2% of residents were under age 18, 8.7% were from 18 to 24, 23.1% were from 25 to 44, 25.8% were from 45 to 64, and 16.2% were 65 years of age or older. For every 100 females there were 93.5 males, and for every 100 females age 18 and over there were 90.3 males age 18 and over.

There were 20,793 households, of which 42.6% had children under the age of 18 living in them. Of all households, 63.4% were married-couple households, 5.0% were cohabiting couple households, 21.0% had a female householder with no partner present, and 10.6% had a male householder with no partner present. About 15.9% of all households were made up of individuals, and 9.9% had someone living alone who was 65 years of age or older. The average household size was 3.09. There were 16,731 families (80.5% of all households).

There were 21,228 housing units at an average density of 1,428.1 units per square mile (551.4 units/km^{2}), of which 20,793 (98.0%) were occupied. Of the occupied units, 76.2% were owner-occupied and 23.8% were occupied by renters. The homeowner vacancy rate was 0.8% and the rental vacancy rate was 2.3%.

Racial composition as of the 2020 census
Race	Number	Percent
White	33,061	51.4%
Black or African American	4,465	6.9%
American Indian and Alaska Native	629	1.0%
Asian	8,642	13.4%
Native Hawaiian and Other Pacific Islander	314	0.5%
Some other race	6,952	10.8%
Two or more races	10,229	15.9%
Hispanic or Latino (of any race)	17,121	26.6%

=== 2023 estimates ===
In 2023, the US Census Bureau estimated that 18.8% of the population were foreign-born. Of all people aged 5 or older, 70.8% spoke only English at home, 13.0% spoke Spanish, 5.8% spoke other Indo-European languages, 9.0% spoke Asian or Pacific Islander languages, and 1.4% spoke other languages. Of those aged 25 or older, 92.1% were high school graduates and 38.8% had a bachelor's degree.

The median household income was $139,567, and the per capita income was $55,927. About 6.1% of families and 7.8% of the population were below the poverty line.

=== Voter Demographics ===
According to the California Secretary of State, as of February 20, 2024, Brentwood has 42,146 registered voters. Of those, 18,726 (44.4%) are registered Democrats, 11,590 (27.5%) are registered Republicans, and 9,598 (22.8%) have declined to state their political affiliation.

== Economy ==
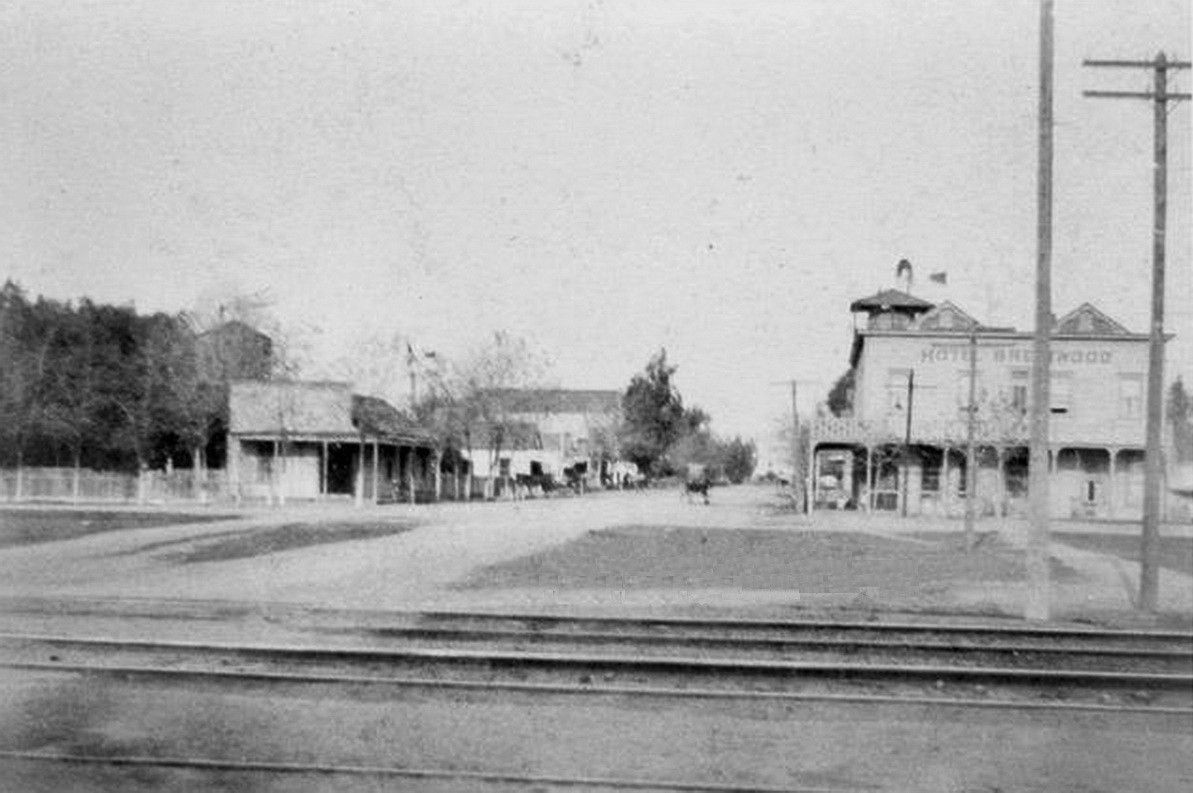
Looking Downtown Brentwood from Oak Street in the late 1890s

Agriculture remains important to the local economy, but has declined in relative importance as the city has become more suburban. Local wineries including Bloomfield, Tamayo, and Hannah Nicole have gained in sales and prestige after winning numerous medals in recent years at the San Francisco Chronicle Wine Competition and the California State Fair. There is no heavy industry and only a small light industrial area in the northeastern part of the city. Brentwood underwent a strong economic boom from 2000 through 2008. Population expanded from 23,302 in 2000 to about 48,000 in 2006, a higher growth rate than other communities in the Bay Area. Some of the new neighborhoods were centered around two new golf courses, the Shadow Lakes Golf Club and the Deer Valley Golf Club, that were constructed to take advantage of the views of Mt. Diablo. The boom stalled in 2009, paralleling the economic crisis that affected all of California, but successful new home subdivisions, including a gated community (Carmel Estates), appeared again in 2010.

Within an active adult community (Trilogy at the Vineyards), Club Los Meganos opened in 2010 with 34,000 square feet (3,200 m^{2}) of athletic club, pool and cabanas, gourmet studio, spa, tennis courts, and events center. In 2013, Brentwood's economy displayed renewed economic vigor with substantial new activity in residential and commercial/retail construction. Sales offices of new home subdivisions commonly advertise new houses beginning in the $500Ks with the largest homes with many upgrades nearing $1M. The overall improvement in the Bay Area economy and anticipation for the 2015 completion of eBart and highway improvements in East Contra Costa County are playing a part in the revival of strong economic growth in Brentwood. One of the most exciting development opportunities in Brentwood is linked to the two Federal research facilities – Lawrence Livermore National Laboratory and Sandia National Laboratories – that are located 25 minutes south of Brentwood. Brentwood has established close relations with the national labs and is a member of i-GATE, which is a regional partnership designed to promote tech-oriented business growth connected with the labs.

=== Top employers ===
According to the city's 2018 Comprehensive Annual Financial Report, the top employers in the city are:

#	Employer	# of Employees	% of Total City Employment
1	Brentwood Union School District	697	4.63%
2	City of Brentwood	448	2.97%
3	Liberty Union High School District	431	2.86%
4	The Home Depot	150	1.00%
5	Safeway	141	0.94%
6	John Muir	132	0.88%
7	Precision Cabinets	130	0.86%
8	Ellison Framing Inc.	125	0.83%
9	Kohl's	123	0.82%
10	WinCo Foods	102	0.68%
11	Raley's	101	0.67%
12	BJ's Brewhouse	100	0.66%
13	Walgreen Co.	85	0.56%
14	Town & Country Roofing	75	0.50%
15	Delta Valley Athletic Club	14	0.09%
16	Best Buy	8	0.05%

== Media ==
The Press building, Brentwood Press' headquarters

Brentwood is served by the Brentwood Press, published by Brentwood Press & Publishing Corporation. Brentwood Press is a weekly newspaper that is published every Friday. The city is also served by the Brentwood News, a weekly community supplement of the East Bay Times.

In 1904, the Brentwood News published its first issue. The Brentwood Press was founded by Jimmy Chamoures in 1999, direct mailing newspapers to all homes and businesses in the city weekly. Since 2020, the newspaper was known as The Press. However, in July, 2020, Brentwood Press moved to a 100% paid-delivery model.

== Transportation ==
=== Highway ===
Public transportation is very limited, so the principal roads leading into the city are very congested with commuter traffic. No freeways served Brentwood directly until February 2008, when the John Marsh Heritage Highway (also known as the California State Route 4 Bypass or Bypass Road, now California State Route 4) was built to connect the western side of Brentwood directly with Antioch. State Route 4 passes by the western edge of Brentwood. The freeway portion of SR 4 ends just south of the Balfour Road exit. SR 4 continues as a two-lane highway to its intersection with Marsh Creek Road and the end of Vasco Road, an unnumbered highway that is the principal route to Livermore, Interstate 580, and the Silicon Valley. To the southeast of Brentwood, County Route J4, known as the Byron Highway, connects to Tracy and the San Joaquin Valley.

=== Bus service ===
Local bus service is provided by Tri Delta Transit, a special purpose district providing public transportation for Eastern Contra Costa County.

Tri Delta Transit Route 300X operates roughly 30-minute express bus service between Brentwood Park & Ride and Antioch BART station Monday through Friday, several times per day.

Tri Delta Transit Route 391 provides weekday and weekend local service between Brentwood Park & Ride and Pittsburgh Center Station, with stops at Antioch BART and Los Medanos College.

The Brentwood Park & Ride is a terminal for Tri Delta Transit routes 202X, 300X, 384, 385, and 391. Tri Delta Transit routes 380, 383, and 395 also serve parts of Brentwood.

=== Rail ===
A light rail Bay Area Rapid Transit expansion from Bay Point to Hillcrest Avenue, serving East Contra Costa County, known as eBart, was put into regular service in August 2018.

There is no passenger rail service to Brentwood. The nearest Altamont Corridor Express train station is in Livermore. The nearest Amtrak station is in Antioch.

There is a freight-only rail line that passes through Brentwood, which is owned by Union Pacific Railroad. However, the line has been inactive since the early 1990s. Union Pacific Railroad does have plans to reactivate this line sometime in the future.

=== Airport ===
Commercial airports serving this area are:

- Oakland International Airport
- San Francisco International Airport
- San Jose International Airport
- Sacramento International Airport
- Stockton Metropolitan Airport

Other nearby airports serving private aircraft are:

- Byron Airport
- Livermore Municipal Airport
- Concord (Buchanan Field)

== Attractions and lifestyle ==
Brentwood was one of 212 cities designated by KaBOOM! as a Playful City USA for 2010 - one of only 23 such cities in California and only three in Northern California. This is the seventh consecutive year that Brentwood has been listed. Each community selected demonstrated creative commitments to the cause of play and fitness. Brentwood was selected for a variety of reasons, including the fact that it offers the community its Wellness Policy, a community-wide aspirational goal which promotes physical activity and education as the benefits of living a healthy lifestyle. Brentwood has many parks and miles of jogging trails, to support healthy lifestyles.

The visual and performing arts are well represented in Brentwood. The city is home to the Brentwood Art Society, which sponsors events such as the annual Art, Wine, and Jazz Festival, the Artists Open Studio Tour, open mic nights, and other gatherings and shows. The Art Society is also a supporter of the Brentwood Theater Company, which since 2010 has been producing Broadway musicals and musical reviews in venues around the city. In spring 2014, a major art gallery was opened in the Streets of Brentwood shopping center.

The Brentwood Parks and Recreation Department reports that it is responsible for 72 city parks. Only four of these exceed 10 acres in size, while 23 parks cover less than one acre each. Brentwood has a building listed on the National Register of Historic Places, the John Marsh House.

=== Points of interest ===
- East Contra Costa Historical Society and Museum - east of Brentwood on Sellers Ave.
- Los Vaqueros Reservoir
- Marsh Creek Regional Trail
- Marsh Creek State Park - currently not open to the public
- Round Valley Regional Preserve
- Vasco Caves Regional Preserve
- Sacramento-San Joaquin River Delta
- Brentwood Civic Center
- Streets of Brentwood - shopping center
- John Marsh House - historic home, currently not open to the public; managed by the John Marsh Historic Trust.
- Delta Theater - historic movie theater located in Downtown Brentwood

=== Agriculture-related attractions ===
- The Art, Wine, and Jazz Festival is held each year in late August. A host of local vintners, wineries, and brewers participate, including: Hannah Nicole Vineyards, Bloomfield Vineyards, Tamayo Family Vineyards, J Doran Vineyards, Cline Cellars, and Black Diamond Brewery.
- Numerous local farms operate produce stands or offer "U-Pick" opportunities throughout Brentwood on the "Harvest Time" farm tour route.
- A farmers' market is held on First Street in downtown Brentwood on Saturday mornings year-round.
