= Rancho Los Méganos =

Mexican land grant in California

Coordinates: 37.950°N 121.680°W

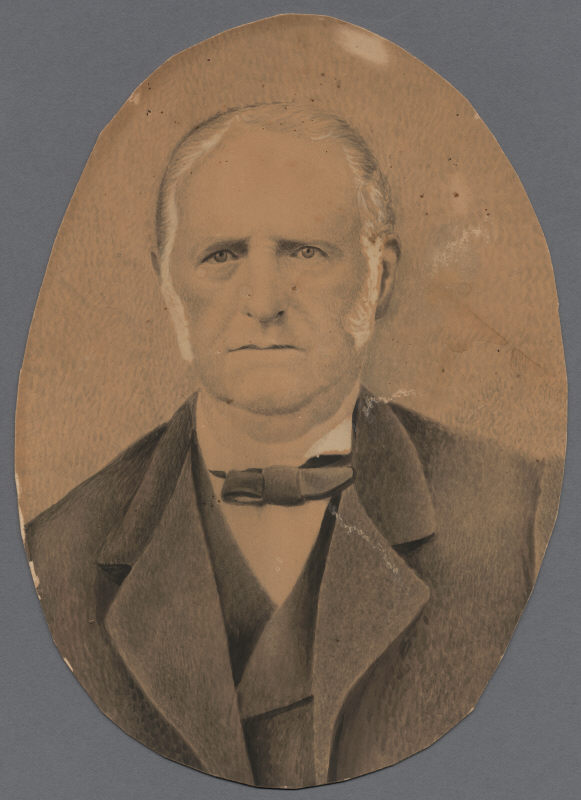
Don José Noriega was granted Rancho Los Méganos in 1835.

Rancho Los Méganos was a 13,316-acre (53.89 km^{2}) Mexican land grant in the southwestern Sacramento-San Joaquin Delta region of present-day Contra Costa County, California.

It was given in 1835 by Governor José Castro to José Noriega. "Méganos" means "sand dunes" in Spanish.

Rancho Los Méganos extended eastward from present-day Antioch along the San Joaquin River to the Old River. The rancho lands included present-day Oakley, Knightsen, and Brentwood.

== History ==
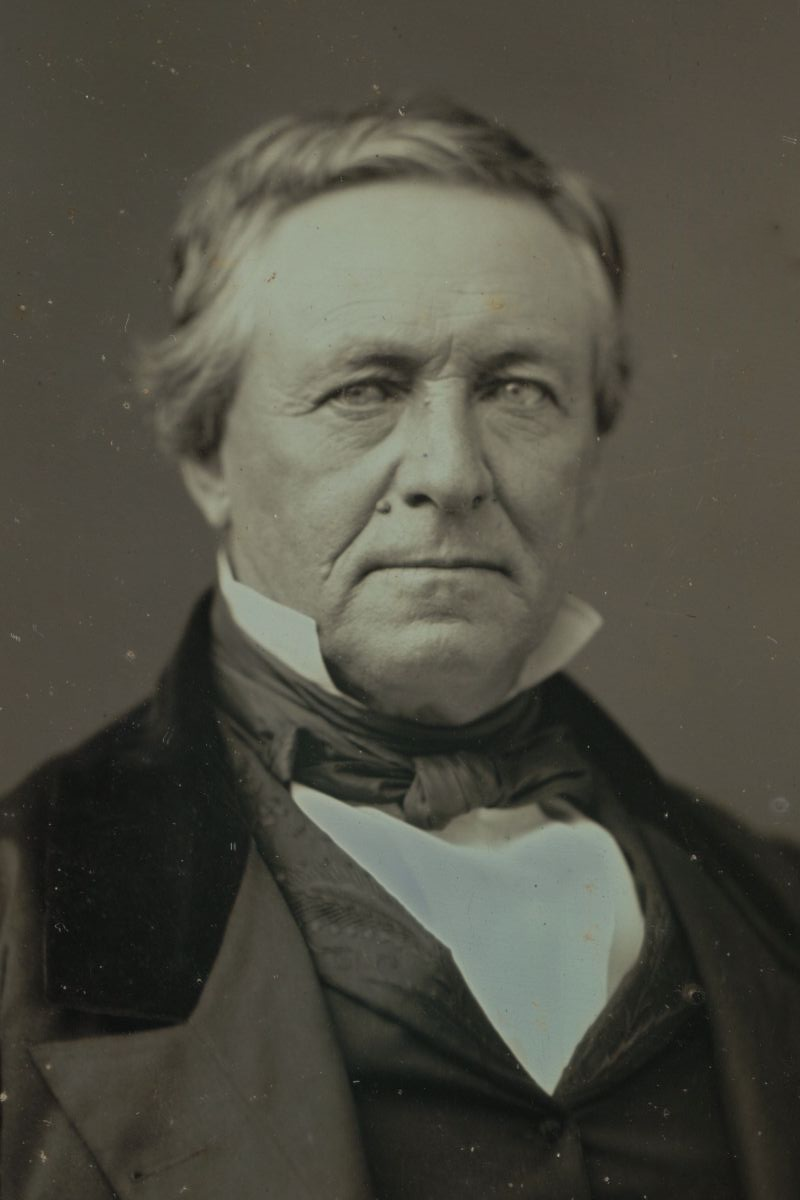
John Marsh in 1852

José Noriega arrived in California in 1834 and received the between three and four square leagues Los Méganos grant in 1835. John Marsh bought the rancho from Jose Noriega in 1837. From that time Los Méganos was also known as the Marsh Ranch. In 1851, Marsh married Abbie Tuck, and in 1854 started on a new house (the stone house). But Abbie Marsh died in 1855, before the house was finished, leaving Marsh and their young daughter Alice. John Marsh was murdered in 1856 by disgruntled employees who felt that he had cheated them out of their wages.

With the cession of California to the United States following the Mexican-American War, the 1848 Treaty of Guadalupe Hidalgo provided that the land grants would be honored. As required by the Land Act of 1851, a claim for Rancho Los Méganos was filed with the Public Land Commission by John Marsh in 1852, and the grant was patented to daughter Alice Marsh in 1867.

Alice Marsh married William Walker Camron in 1871. The couple later lived in Oakland in the Camron-Stanford House, originally erected by Dr. Samuel Merritt on the southwest shore of Lake Merritt. In 1871 son, Charles P. Marsh, mortgaged the rancho and lost it to the Savings and Loan Society (of San Francisco), who sold the property to James T. Sanford of New York. In 1878, the Savings and Loan Society foreclosed on Sanford and held the rancho until 1900, when the Balfour Guthrie Investment company purchased the rancho.

== Historic sites of the Rancho ==
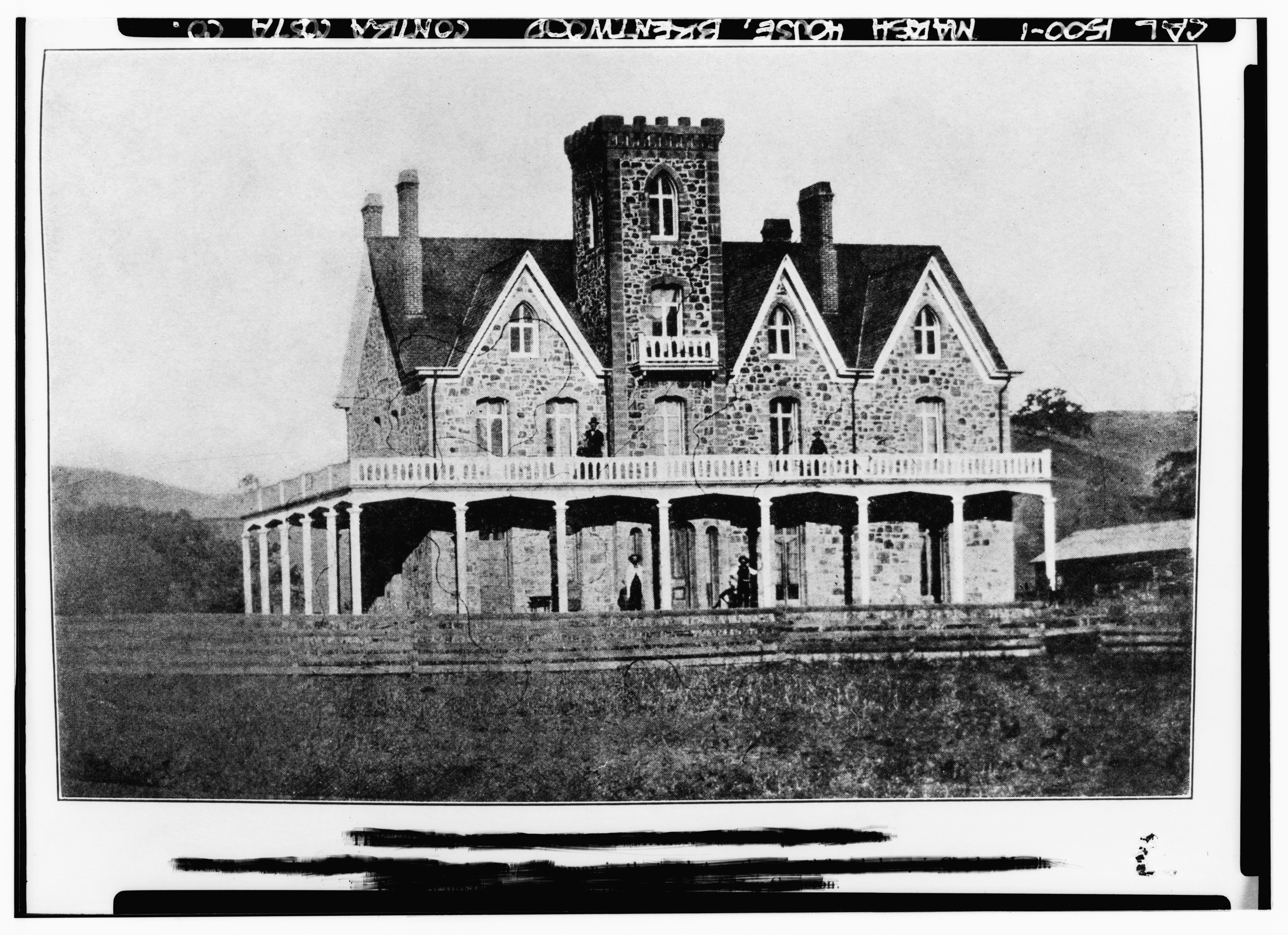
John Marsh stone house on Rancho Los Méganos. The home still exists, and has been stabilized, but awaits restoration (pending fundraising). See External Links below.

- Stone House of John Marsh. Completed in 1856.
- Site of the Murder of Dr John Marsh.

== See also ==
- Ranchos of Contra Costa County, California
- Marsh Creek State Park (California)
- Los Medanos College
