= Marsh Creek State Park (California) =

State park in California, United States

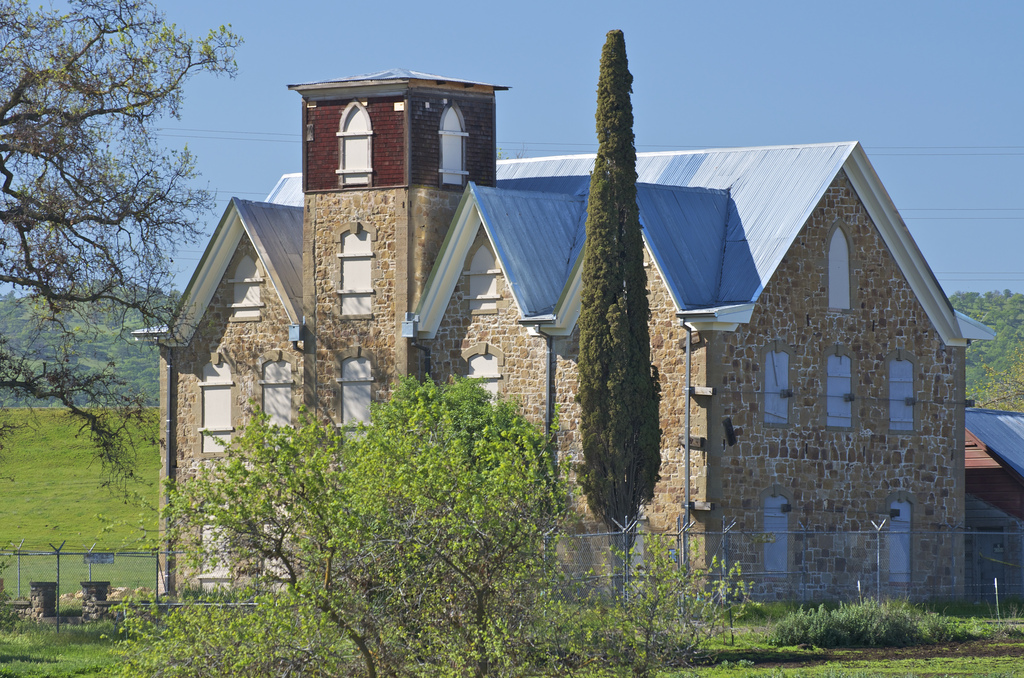
- John Marsh House in Marsh Creek State Park, California; Photo date August 30, 2012.
- Interactive map of Marsh Creek State Park
- Location: Contra Costa County, California
- Nearest city: Brentwood, California
- Area: 3,659 acres (14.81 km^{2})
- Designation: State Historic Park
- Designated: January 27, 2012
- Governing body: California Department of Parks and Recreation
- Owner: State of California
- Website: www.parks.ca.gov?page_id=525

Marsh Creek State Park is a State Historic Park in east Contra Costa County, California, United States. About 3.3 miles (5.3 km) south of downtown Brentwood. The park, named for the creek flowing through the property, contains the historic stone John Marsh house, ranching buildings, and numerous pre-historic archaeological sites. The creek is named for the ranch's former owner and California pioneer John Marsh (1799–1856), who was a doctor, rancher, landowner and the first non-Hispanic European to settle in what is now Contra Costa County, California. The park is not yet open to the public.

The park is significant for many reasons. It represents the Mexican period in California history, was an important site for the Miwok and other Native American people, was home of vaqueros, was the end point of the California Trail (with the first party over the Sierra Nevada coming directly to the John Marsh rancho at his invitation), and its archaeological site has produced artifacts going back 7,000 years. It has been identified by the Sacramento Archaeological Society as being the most important archaeological site in the California State Park system.

== History ==
The house has been publicly owned as a historic site since 1960, when the owner Henry Cowell donated it to Contra Costa County for preservation and restoration. The ranch property itself was acquired by the Trust for Public Land in 2002 and conveyed to the state to become a new state park. In 2012, the combined park property, previously unnamed and referred to as Cowell Ranch/John Marsh, was given an official name alongside the approval of a General Plan for the development of the park.

Archaeologists have found that Native Americans lived in the East Contra Costa County area at least 7,000 years ago. Some of the groups identified with the area are the Volvone and the Miwoks. Excavations have turned up human remains and other historical items that confirm this. Some burial sites have been identified. The park planners intend to protect these cultural sites that lie within the park boundaries.

State Park Senior Archaeologist Rick Fitzgerald led a group of Sacramento archaeologists on a tour of a Marsh Creek archaeology site on April 10, 2010. According to the Marsh Creek State Park General Plan and Program Environmental Impact Report, "The archaeological resources at Marsh Creek State Park are some of the most unique and important within the California State Park System. Research has indicated that the first inhabitants occupied the area by at least 7,000 years ago. At about 4,000 years ago the Windmiller culture made its first appearance at Marsh Creek. The Windmiller people represent one of the most sophisticated and advanced pre-historic cultures of aboriginal California. They lived up and down the Central Valley, with their heartland being the Delta region. These findings are important because they shed light on a rare and unique manifestation of a pre-historic culture in California seldom seen in the archaeological record. Statewide, less than ten Windmiller sites have been identified and fewer have been excavated. The Windmiller occupation eventually gave way to what is called the Meganos people, who carried on the Windmiller culture until about 1,000 years ago. Evidence of these people also exists at the Park."

=== John Marsh ===
Marsh was the first medical doctor in California, the first Harvard graduate in the territory, the first to introduce a number of new crops, and one of the most influential men in the establishment of California statehood. Marsh, a widower, was a native of Massachusetts, who had previously lived in Minnesota, Illinois, Wisconsin, Missouri and New Mexico before settling in Los Angeles, California. In 1838, he acquired Rancho Los Meganos in northern California. The ranch covered over 80 square miles (21,000 ha), and extended over 8 miles (13 km) to the San Joaquin River, where Marsh's Landing was built (near present-day Antioch, California). The park covers a portion of this former rancho. Marsh reportedly paid $300 in cowhides for the land.

=== John Marsh House ===
- John Marsh House
- U.S. National Register of Historic Places
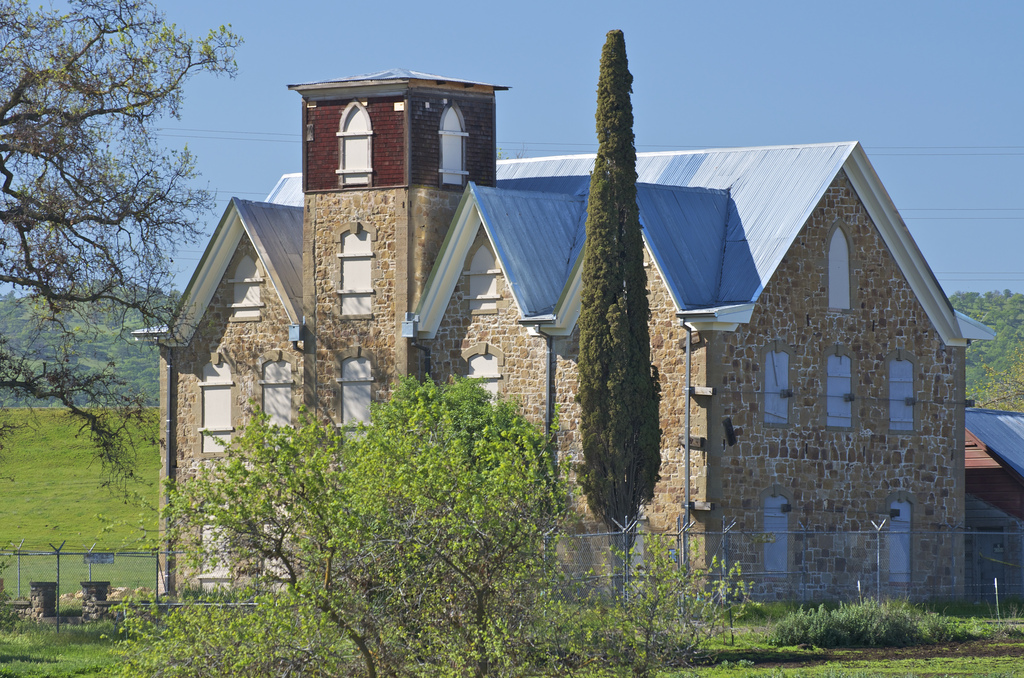
- John Marsh House, August 30, 2012 Photo by Robin Mayoff
- Location: Contra Costa County, California
- Coordinates: 37°53′30″N 121°43′22″W
- Built: 1856
- Architect: Thomas Boyd
- Architectural style: Gothic Revival
- NRHP reference No.: 71000136
- Added to NRHP: October 7, 1971

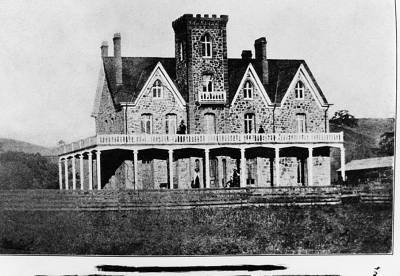
John Marsh House, c. 1856

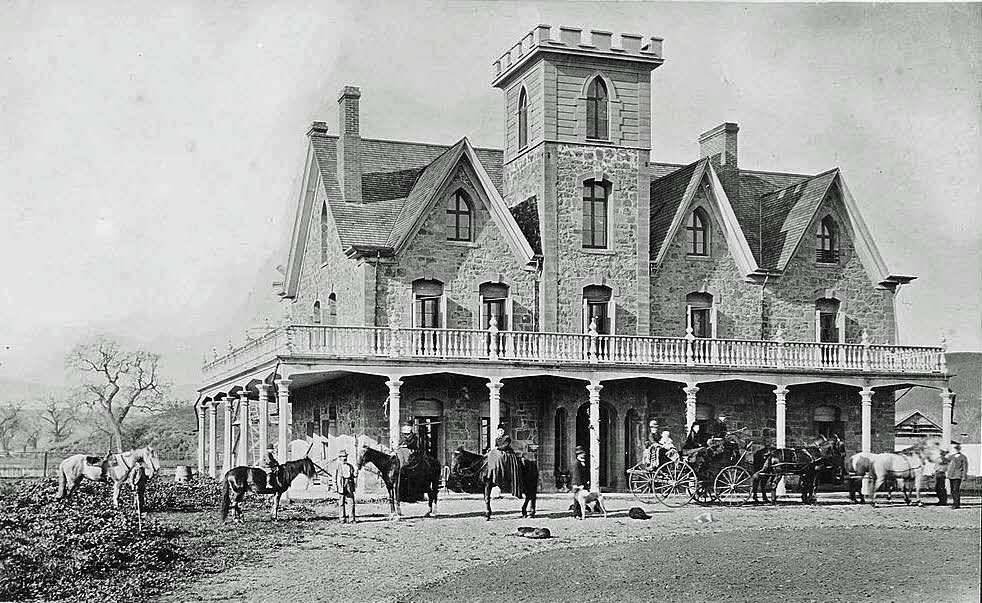
John Marsh house, c. 1870

A highlight of the park is the home of John Marsh, which was begun in 1853 and completed in 1856, and which has been undergoing extensive renovation for several years. Marsh was the first non-Hispanic white settler to live in the county. The property encompassed by Marsh Creek State Park was part of Rancho Los Meganos, (Los Meganos is a Spanish phrase meaning "sand dunes"), which Marsh acquired in 1838. Initially, Marsh lived in a four-room adobe house which had been built on the property for him by local Miwok Indians. Marsh apparently got along well with the Miwoks and had even provided them with free medical care. In return, the tribesmen built the adobe house. After he married Abby (Note: Her name also has been spelled as Abbie.) Tuck in 1851, he retained San Francisco architect Thomas Boyd to design a grand new mansion. Many of the features apparently were stipulated by Marsh himself. John's wife, Abby, had selected the site for the house along Marsh Creek. The new Gothic Revival style house was three stories high and had an observation tower that rose 65 feet (20 m) into the air. Marsh built the tower so that he could see the approach of strangers from a great distance. Rustlers and marauders frequently came to his ranch to steal cattle or steal other valuables. However, the stone tower proved vulnerable to earthquakes. The original tower collapsed during the 1868 Hayward earthquake. It was rebuilt with wood, but the replacement collapsed again after the 1906 quake. Images from the Historical American Building Survey (HABS) collection in the Library of Congress shown here depict the differences in the two structures. This house is the earliest substantial building in Contra Costa County that was not built entirely of adobe.

The Marsh mansion soon became known as the "Stone House" because the walls were covered with locally quarried sandstone. Abby died in 1855, before the house was finished. It was still not quite complete when John moved from the adobe house into one of the upstairs bedrooms in the new house about September 1, 1856. John was murdered while returning from a trip to Martinez, California on September 24, 1856. In 1860, the U. S. Land Commission recognized over 13,000 acres (5,300 ha) as part of the Marsh estate, which was shared by Charles and Alice Marsh. Alice was the daughter of John and Abby. Charles was John's son by John's first marriage.

A series of tenant farmers occupied the house. Reportedly, one occupant complained in 1878 that the house was in bad shape. The ranch was bought by the Balfour-Guthrie Company. The Cowell Company subsequently acquired the house and land. Neither company had any particular use for the house and spent little on maintenance.

According to Craig's report for HABS, the floor space of the house consisted of 2,100 square feet (200 m^{2}) on each of the three main floors, 720 square feet (67 m^{2}) in the basement and 144 square feet (13.4 m^{2}) in the tower. The Marsh house footprint is 36 feet (11 m) long by 30 feet (9.1 m) wide, and the height is 38 feet (12 m) to the ridge of the roof. The roof has four large dormers, so that the third story rooms are full height. The tower is 47 feet (14 m) tall. (Note: Craig reported that an 1856 San Francisco newspaper article described the tower as 65 feet tall, but others have said that it was 45 to 47 feet high. Old photographs suggest the latter is more nearly correct, especially if the interior rooms were no more than 12 feet high.) A ten-foot (3.0 m) wide portico or veranda surrounds the house on three sides. The portico has a balcony at the second floor-level, which was supported by octagonal pillars. The balcony was decorated with balustrades, as can be seen easily in the 1870 photo shown here. Full-length French doors allowed access from the portico to each room on the first and second floors.

The house has an exterior wall covered with twelve-inch (300 mm) wide, buff-colored sandstone blocks. Inside the stone exterior, there was a four-inch (100 mm) void, then another wall built of adobe brick. (Note: The sandstone was quarried on the ranch, which also had a plant to make the bricks.) The architect chose to use an asymmetric Victorian floor plan, instead of the symmetrical Georgian style that was popular in most of the larger California houses built in the 1850s. The first floor contained a stair hall that ran from the front door to the rear door, a parlor, dining room, office and kitchen. The parlor is 20 feet (6.1 m) by 35 feet (11 m) by 12 feet (3.7 m) high. The second level has the master bedroom located directly above the parlor and accesses to the top level of the portico. There are two other bedrooms and a bath on the second level that access the stair hall. Another stair leads to the third level, which contains three more rooms. A ladder leads from the third floor hall to the tower parapet.

The original tower was built entirely of stone and designed for defense against unwelcome visitors, because the area was considered "bandit country," with no organized law enforcement agency at the time. The top of the tower was crenellated, giving it a fortress-like appearance and providing some protection to the defenders. However, an earthquake in 1868, severely damaged the tower, and it needed to be mostly rebuilt. The rebuilt tower had a wood top that imitated the former castellated stone and the vertical wood surfaces covered with shingles. The shingles were painted about 1925.

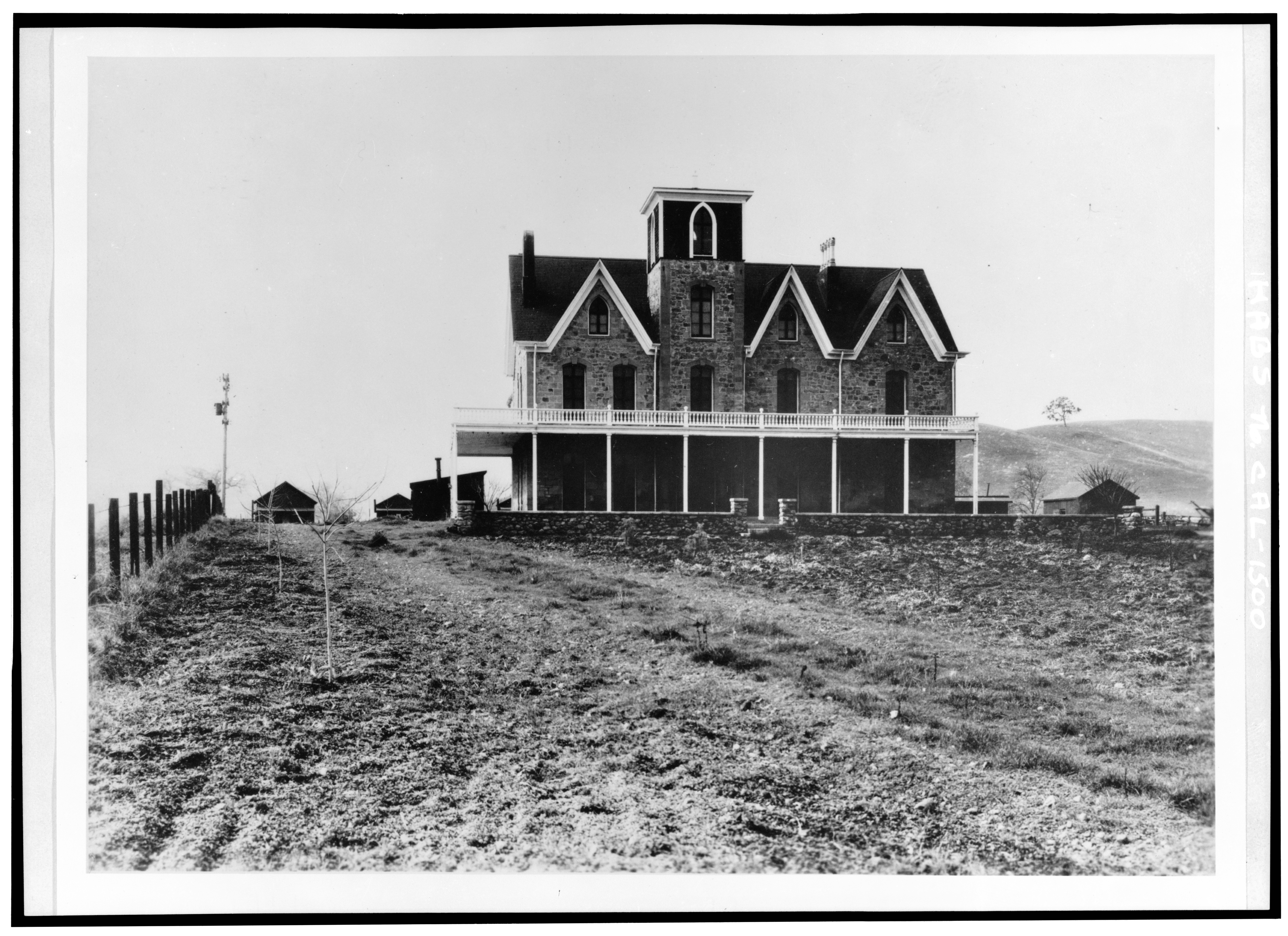
Marsh House ca 1920

The main interior partitions were masonry, other walls were wood studs with wood lath. The walls were then plastered. Ceilings were constructed of lath and plaster. The roof was framed and the exterior was originally covered with wood shingles (later replaced with asphalt shingles). During the 2006 reconstruction, inspections showed the roof so damaged and leaky from rot that was given a temporary cover of tin, as shown in the 2012 photo above.

==== Present Status ====
In 1960, Henry Cowell, the last owner and operator of the ranch, donated the house to Contra Costa County, with the understanding that the house would be restored. Ownership then passed to the California State Parks Department in 1979. The John Marsh House was listed on the National Register of Historic Places (NRHP) with Reference Number on October 7, 1971.

Neither Cowell, the county nor the state was able to come up with funding for even the essential restoration. In 2004, the John Marsh Historic Trust was organized to attract private donations for that purpose. Meanwhile, nature continued to damage the house. A large section of the south wall collapsed in the 1970s, as a result of an earthquake.

Among the major objectives for future restoration and reconstruction work are:

- Repairing the load-bearing interior walls, which will be retained;
- Rebuilding the portico;
- Rebuilding the top of the tower;
- Installing new roofing;
- Adding sandstone finishing to the south wall exterior.

As of 2013, nearly one million dollars had been spent on stabilizing the house since 2006. This work was required to keep the sandstone structure from collapsing. The state of California allocated a further $1.4 million for construction and restoration of the house as part of the state's 2021 – 2022 budget.

== Development plans ==
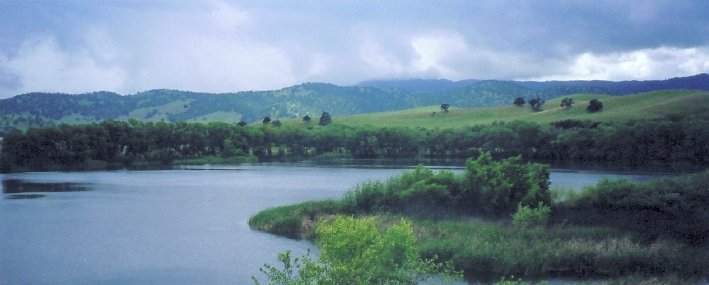
Marsh Creek Reservoir in the park

Creation of a visitor center, trailheads, picnic areas, parking, equestrian facilities, campsites and accommodations for special events, such as a farmers market, are all under consideration for future development. Restoration of the Stone House may occur, possibly funded by the California Cultural Historic Endowment and donations from the John Marsh Historic Trust. Construction of a replica of Marsh's original four-room adobe house is also under consideration. The park land contains some historic Native American burial sites. Larry Myers, a representative of the California Native American Heritage Commission, urged state park officials to keep the burial sites off-limits to the public.

The General Plan calls for 70 miles (110 km) of trails, an 11-acre (4.5 ha) Primary Historic Zone that contains the Stone House, the replica of Marsh's adobe house, and the replica Ohlone village (representing that which was originally located near Marsh's adobe house).

== See also ==
- John Marsh (pioneer)
- List of ranchos of California
- Ranchos of California
