= Camron-Stanford House =

Historic house in California, United States

- Cameron-Stanford House
- U.S. National Register of Historic Places
- Oakland Designated Landmark
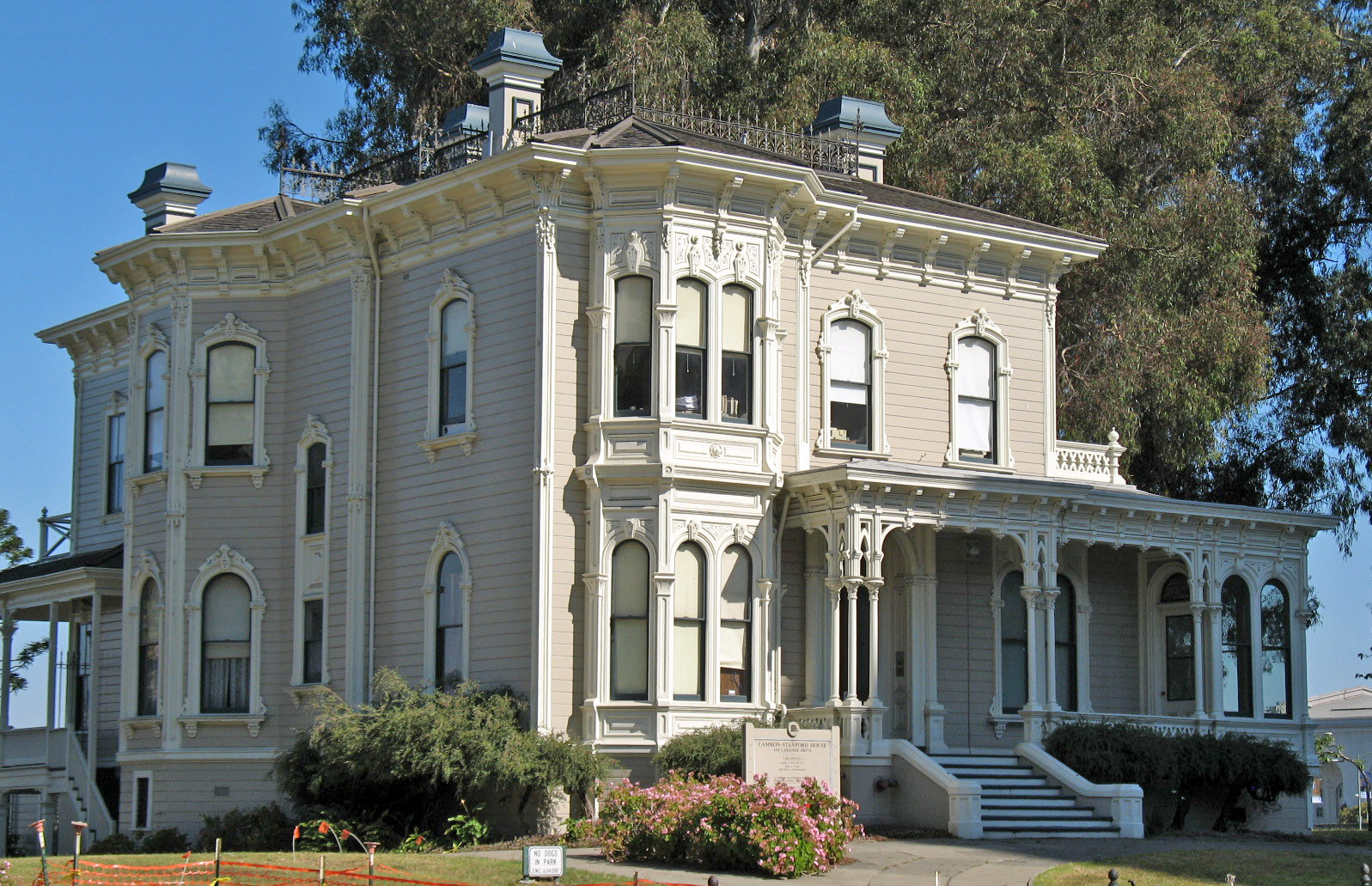

- Location within California
- Location: 1426 Lakeside Drive, Oakland, California
- Coordinates: 37°48′05″N 122°15′40″W
- Area: 0 acres (0 ha)
- Built: 1871
- Built by: Will W. Cameron
- Architectural style: Italianate
- NRHP reference No.: 72000213
- ODL No.: 2

Significant dates
- Added to NRHP: June 13, 1972
- Designated ODL: 1975

The Camron-Stanford House is the last of the 19th-century Victorian mansions that once surrounded Lake Merritt in Oakland, California. It was the home to a series of influential families, and in 1907, became the city's first museum.

== History ==
The home was built in 1876, and its first occupants were William Walker Camron and his wife, Alice (Marsh) Camron. She was the daughter of Dr. John Marsh, who was a California pioneer. Marsh was influential in encouraging wagon trains of settlers to come to California and also in its obtaining independence from Mexico. He owned the 13,000-acre Rancho los Meganos and the large, stone house of John Marsh that he built there, in what is now Marsh Creek State Park, still stands. He was murdered by a disgruntled employee, and as a young woman, Alice received a large inheritance, which she used to purchase the Camron-Stanford house from its builder, Samuel Merritt.

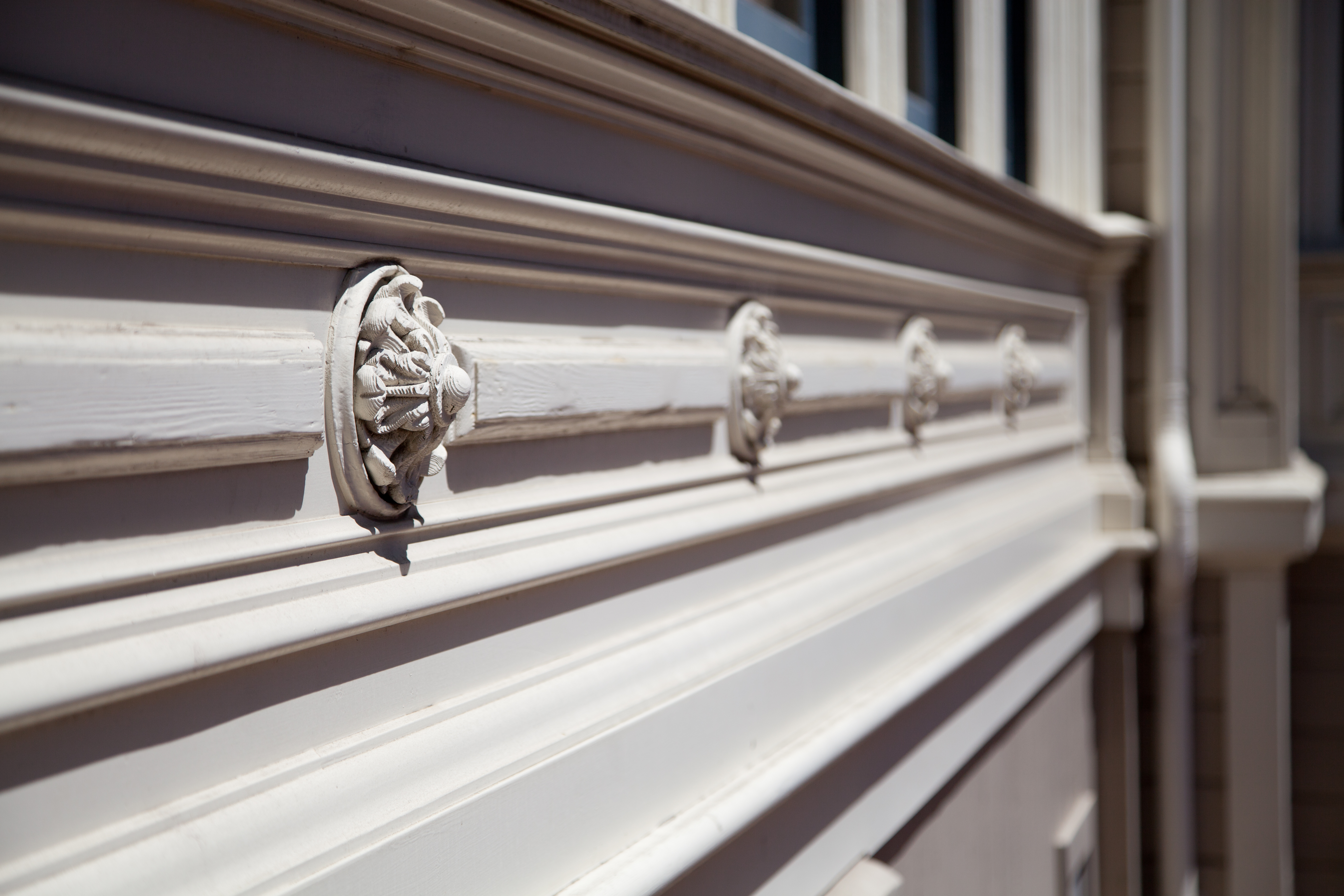
Architectural detail on the Camron-Stanford House.

Her husband, William Camron, was a deputy sheriff and was active in the Republican Party. He was appointed to a vacant seat on the Oakland City Council, and later became a member of the California State Assembly.

Next to occupy the home was the family of David Hewes. He made and lost several fortunes. He is best known for donating one of the golden spikes used in the celebration of the completion of the first transcontinental railroad at Promontory Summit, Utah in 1869.

The Josiah Stanford family owned the home from 1882 to 1903. Josiah Stanford was a brother of Leland Stanford, who was one of the founders of the Central Pacific Railroad, which built the portion of the first transcontinental railroad east from Sacramento to Promontory Summit.

In 1907, the city of Oakland purchased the Camron-Stanford house and other private residences bordering Lake Merritt. The city razed the other homes and created Lakeside Park. It established the Oakland Museum in the Camron-Stanford house, which occupied the house for the next five decades. The museum merged with the Oakland Art Gallery and the Snow Museum and in 1965, moved to other quarters. However, public interest and donations saved the Camron-Stanford House, and today it is an independent museum.

The house has been listed on the National Register of Historic Places since June 13, 1972.
