= Snow Museum of Natural History =

- Established: 1922
- Dissolved: 1967
- Location: Oakland, California, United States
- Type: Natural history museum
- Founder: Henry A. Snow

The Snow Museum of Natural History was a natural history museum located in Oakland, California, on the shore of Lake Merritt. It was founded in 1922 by naturalist Henry A. Snow, displaying his collections of taxidermy specimens, pelts, bird eggs, and living animals. The Snow Museum collections formed the basis of both the Oakland Museum of California and the Oakland Zoo.

== History ==
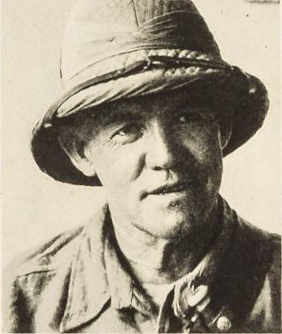
Henry A. Snow, c. 1922

In 1919, Oakland resident Henry A. Snow returned from a major hunting expedition in Kenya. He offered to donate his collected specimens to the city, under the condition that a museum building be constructed to house them. The City of Oakland provided a 30-room mansion near Lake Merritt to temporarily house the collection, and the Snow Museum opened in this building in 1922. The museum's collections were expanded by the Snow family through the 1920s, over multiple hunts in Africa, North America, and the Arctic. Several of these expeditions were filmed, and were edited into feature films such as 1922's Hunting Big Game in Africa with Gun and Camera.

When the Snow Museum opened, the property was home to living animals, cared for by Snow's son Sidney. Due to noise and space concerns, these animals were moved to a larger property in Durant Park. This facility, the Oakland Zoo, opened in 1939. Although Snow intended to have a permanent museum building completed, this did not come to fruition. Snow died on July 28, 1927, and his daughter Nydine took over operation of the museum.

The Snow Museum closed in 1967. The majority of its collections from outside North America were auctioned off, and its egg and nest collections were transferred to the Western Foundation of Vertebrate Zoology in 1976. The remaining specimens were combined with the collections of two other small museums, the Oakland Public Museum and the Oakland Art Museum, to form the Oakland Museum (now the Oakland Museum of California) in 1969. The museum building was demolished in 1970, and the site is now occupied by Snow Park.
