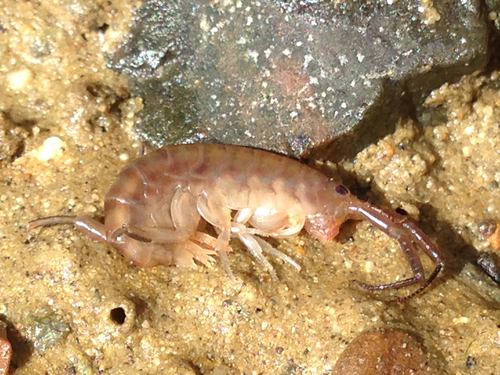

Scientific classification
- Domain: Eukaryota
- Kingdom: Animalia
- Phylum: Arthropoda
- Class: Malacostraca
- Order: Amphipoda
- Family: Talitridae
- Genus: Bulychevia
- Species: B. enigmatica

Binomial name
- Bulychevia enigmatica (Bousfield and Carlton, 1967)

Synonyms
- Orchestia enigmatica Bousfield & Carlton, 1967; Transorchestia enigmatica (Bousfield & Carlton, 1967)

= Bulychevia enigmatica =

Species of crustacean

Bulchevia enigmatica is a species of beach hopper in the family Talitridae. So far, it has only been found in Lake Merritt in Oakland, California, where it was found by Jim Carlton in 1962. In 1967, Carlton and Edward L. Bousfield of the National Museum of Canada published a paper naming it Orchestia enigmatica. Bousfield re-classified it as Transorchestia enigmatica in 1982. It is not thought to be endemic to California. Its closest known relative is the Transorchestia chiliensis.

It has since been moved into the genus Bulchevia.
