= Oakland Museum of California =

Art museum in Oakland, California

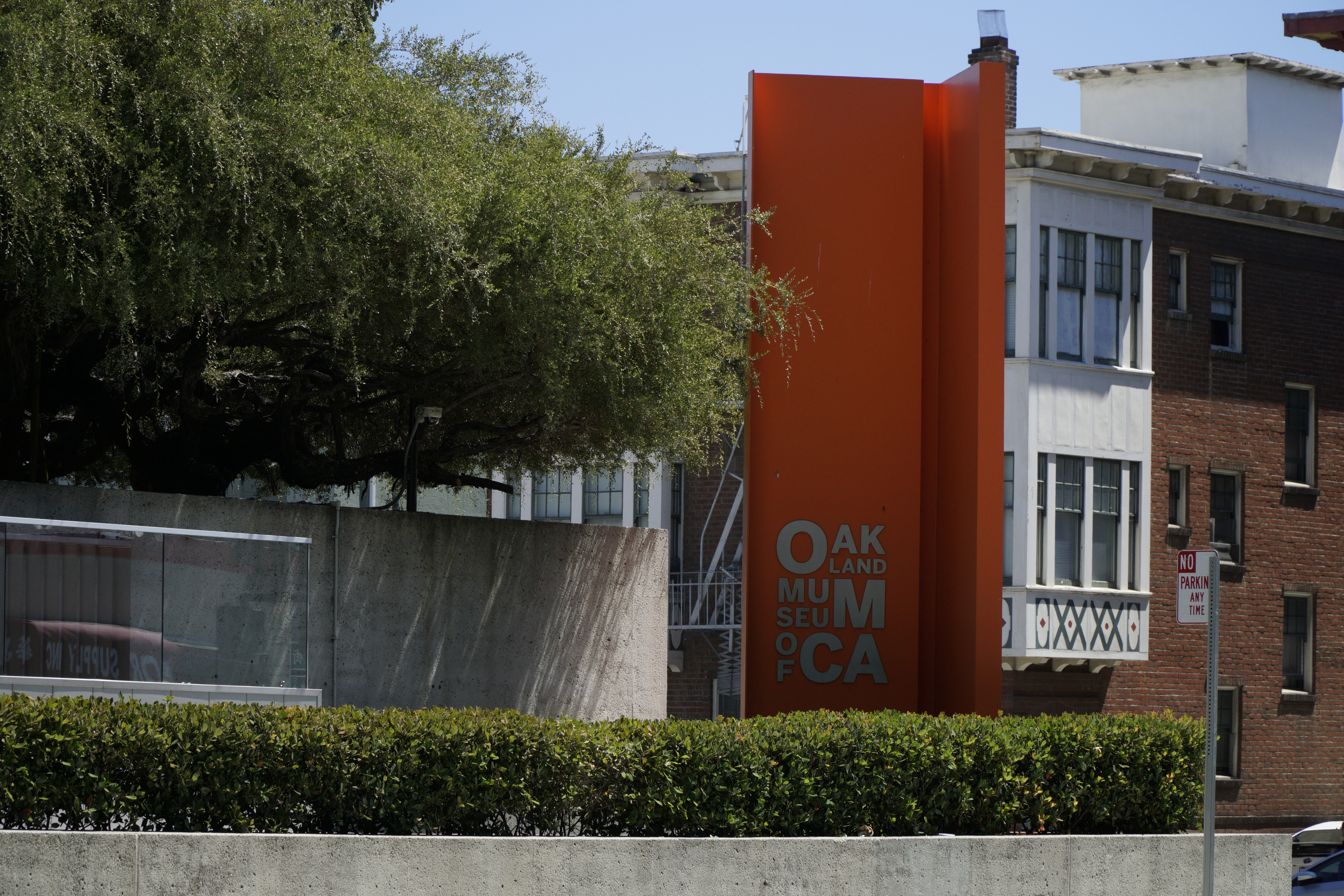

- Location within Oakland, California Location within California Location within the United States
- Established: 1969
- Location: 1000 Oak St, Oakland, CA 94607
- Coordinates: 37.7986°N 122.2636°W
- Type: Art, History, Natural Science
- Director: Lori Fogarty
- Public transit access: Lake Merritt
- Website: museumca.org

Oakland Designated Landmark
- Designated: 1995
- Reference no.: 119

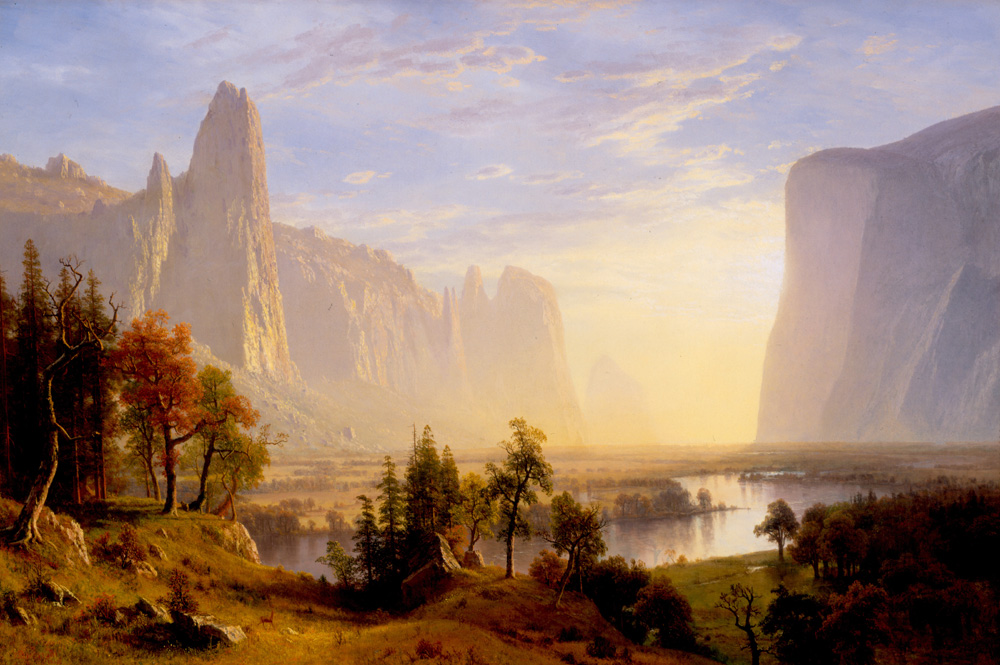
Albert Bierstadt, Yosemite Valley, 1868, oil on canvas

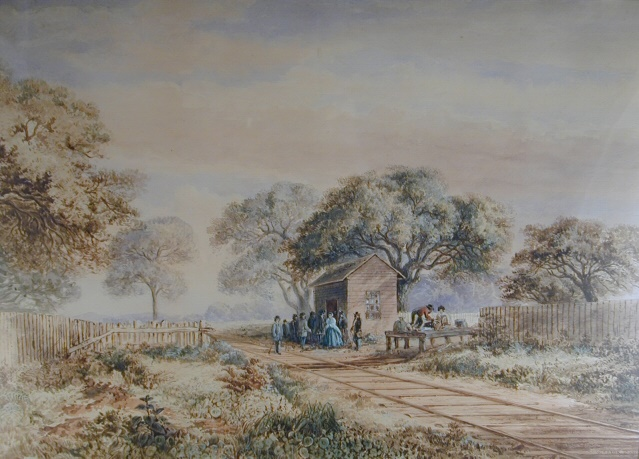
William Keith, Early Oakland, 7th and Adeline Streets, The Southern Pacific Depot, 1867, watercolor

The Oakland Museum of California or OMCA (formerly the Oakland Museum) is an interdisciplinary museum dedicated to the art, history, and natural science of California, located at 1000 Oak Street in Oakland, California. The museum contains more than 1.8 million objects dedicated to "telling the extraordinary story of California."

== History ==
The OMCA was founded in 1969 as a merger of three smaller area museums – the Oakland Public Museum, the Oakland Art Gallery, and the Snow Museum of Natural History. The seeds of this merger began in 1954 when the three organizations established a nonprofit association with the goal of merging their collections under one umbrella. This plan was eventually realized in 1961 when voters approved a $6.6 million bond issue to start the development of what would become the OMCA campus overlooking Lake Merritt in the city center.

The museum's founding credo positioned itself as a “people’s museum,” wherein it was dedicated to representing the diverse communities of Oakland. This rhetoric was by and large influenced by the social and political environment of the late 1960s civil rights movements. (The museum's campus is located adjacent to the Alameda County Court House where at the time of its opening ongoing protests had been taking place to demand freedom for Huey Newton, a co-founder of the Black Panther Party.)

In this climate and based the OMCA's founding principles, the inaugural director Jim Holliday lobbied the museum's board of directors to form a community advisory committee in order to diversify representation at the decision-making level for the newly formed museum. This effort led to Holliday being relieved of his duties by the board six months before the museum opened its doors. His termination sparked controversy within the ranks of the museum staff and even provoked the newly hired director of education Julia Hare to resign.

Fallout from this event continued into the 1970s as some community members decided to boycott the museum. In an effort to alleviate this tension, the OMCA decided to hire local artist Ben Hazard as the curator of special exhibits and education. Hazard went on to organize with the local population to form the Cultural and Ethnic Affairs Guild. The Guild helped program community events at the museum and formed myriad ethnicity-based advisory committees that have left a lasting impact on how the museum operates to this day.

In October 2025, over 1000 items were stolen from an off-site storage facility owned by the museum. The theft occurred during the same week as the 2025 Louvre robbery. The Oakland Police Department said those items included Native American baskets and jewelry, as well as laptops owned by the museum. Their monetary value is not known. The museum announced on Oct. 31, 2025, that investigators believe the burglary was a "crime of opportunity" and not a planned heist. This was at least the second time the museum collection was burgled: In 2013 a thief broke into the museum itself and stole a Gold Rush-era jewelry box made of California gold, adorned with gold veined quartz, and valued at $800,000. The box was recovered later that same year.

== Facilities ==
The museum building, designed by architect Kevin Roche John Dinkeloo and Associates LLC (Roche-Dinkeloo), with landscape design by Dan Kiley and gardens by Geraldine Knight Scott, is an important example of mid-century modernism and the integration of indoor and outdoor spaces. The concrete building includes three tiers, one each focusing on the art, history, and natural science collections, along with temporary exhibition galleries, an auditorium, a restaurant, and other ancillary spaces. Outdoor architectural features are terraced roof gardens, patios, outdoor sculpture, a large lawn area, and a koi pond.

Between 2009 and 2013, the museum underwent a major renovation and expansion designed by Mark Cavagnero Associates. The art and history galleries were closed from August 2009 to May 2010, followed by closure of the natural science gallery and education facilities (reopened in May 2013). Skidmore, Owings and Merrill designed the environmental graphics program for the renovation and re-branding of the museum. Core support for the capital improvements came from Measure G, a $23.6 million bond initiative passed by Oakland voters in 2002. The museum is also planning a renovation to its building's exterior facilities, which would open up the building's courtyard with a new entrance along the 12th Street side facing Lake Merritt in order to better connect the facility to the neighborhood. The $18–20 million exterior renovation is planned to be completed by Fall 2020.

== Collections ==
=== Art ===
The museum owns more than 70,000 examples of California art and design, created from the mid-1800s to the present. Painters represented in the art collection include Addie L. Ballou, Albert Bierstadt, George Henry Burgess, Richard Diebenkorn, Maynard Dixon, Childe Hassam, Thomas Hill, Amédée Joullin, William Keith, David Park, Mel Ramos, Granville Redmond, Jules Tavernier, Wayne Thiebaud, and the "Society of Six" (William H. Clapp, Selden Connor Gile, August Gay, Bernard Von Eichman, Maurice Logan, and Louis Siegriest). The museum holds the personal archives of Dorothea Lange and images by many other noted photographers. Lange's archive was a gift given by the artist herself and includes thousands of negatives and vintage prints as well as field notes and personal memorabilia. Tony Labat’s “Big Peace IV" sculpture is a large, yellow peace sign on the museum's rooftop, in a section that is freely accessible when the museum is open.

==== Craftsman movement ====
The museum holds a notable collection of paintings and decorative objects associated with the American Craftsman movement, including a large collection of paintings and decorative art by Arthur Mathews and his wife Lucia Kleinhans Mathews. The museum holds over 500 paintings, drawings, furniture, and other decorative artwork produced by Arthur and Lucia. OMCA is also home to the Matthews's archive which contains notes, sketches, and other memorabilia.

=== History ===
More than 1.8 million items represent California's history and cultures from the era before Europeans arrived, to the 21st century. The strongest collections are in photography including the Dorthea Lange collection. California native baskets and other material; California Gold Rush era artifacts; and material that relates to California technology, agriculture, business and labor, domestic life, and significant events such as World War II.

The Native Californian basket collection includes an estimated 2,500 baskets from various geographic and cultural regions of California. One of the highlights of the collection is an Ohlone basket commissioned by the museum in 2010 from Ohlone artist Linda Yamane.

=== Natural sciences ===
The collection of the Natural Sciences Department showcases California as a biodiversity hotspot and as the state containing the greatest biological diversity in the nation. It numbers more than 100,000 research specimens and other artifacts, including over 10,000 identified and pinned entomology specimens, over 5,000 specimens in the malacology (shell) collection, more than 2,000 bird and mammal study skins and mounts, several thousand bird eggs, more than 3,180 herbarium sheets, over 2,330 freeze-dried exhibit specimens, as well as collections of reptiles and amphibians, fishes, terrestrial and marine invertebrates, and fungi.

== Predecessor museums ==
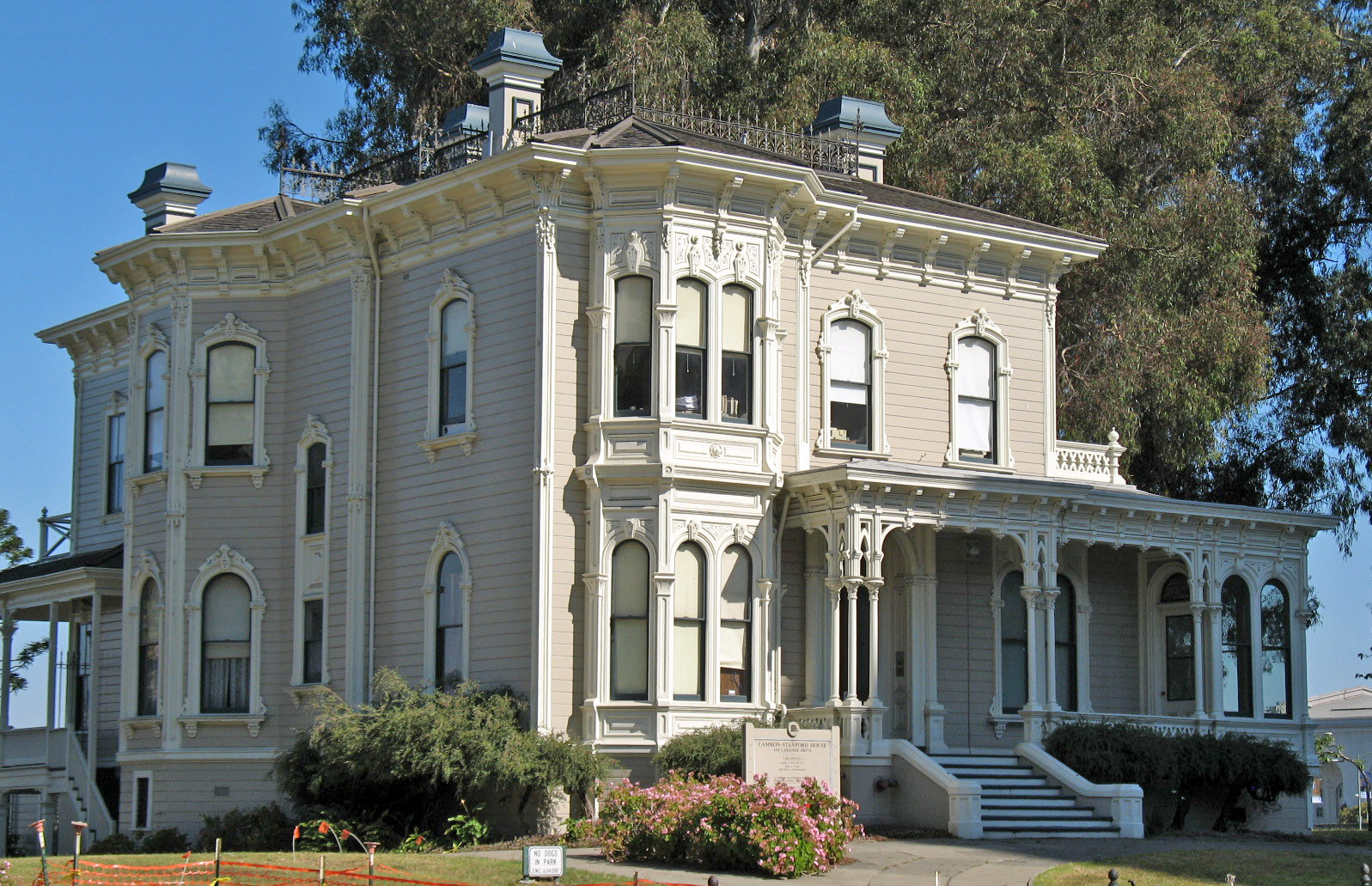
The Oakland Public Museum was originally housed in the Camron-Stanford House from 1910 to 1967. The house is now a separate museum.

The Oakland Public Museum opened in the nearby Camron-Stanford House in 1910. Its first curator, Charles P. Wilcomb, gathered a collection representing two aspects of California cultural history, Native Americans and settlers from the East Coast. The Oakland Art Gallery opened in the Oakland Municipal Auditorium in 1916, originally under the auspices of the Oakland Public Museum, whose director at the time, Robert B. Harshe, was an artist. The Snow Museum of Natural History opened in the Cutting mansion, also on the shore of Lake Merritt, in 1922. Although the merged Oakland Museum focuses on California art, history and nature, some "legacy" pieces from outside the state remain, such as a collection of snuff bottles and a carved jade pagoda.
