= Cleveland Cascade =

Stairway

Coordinates: 37.80625°N 122.2495°W

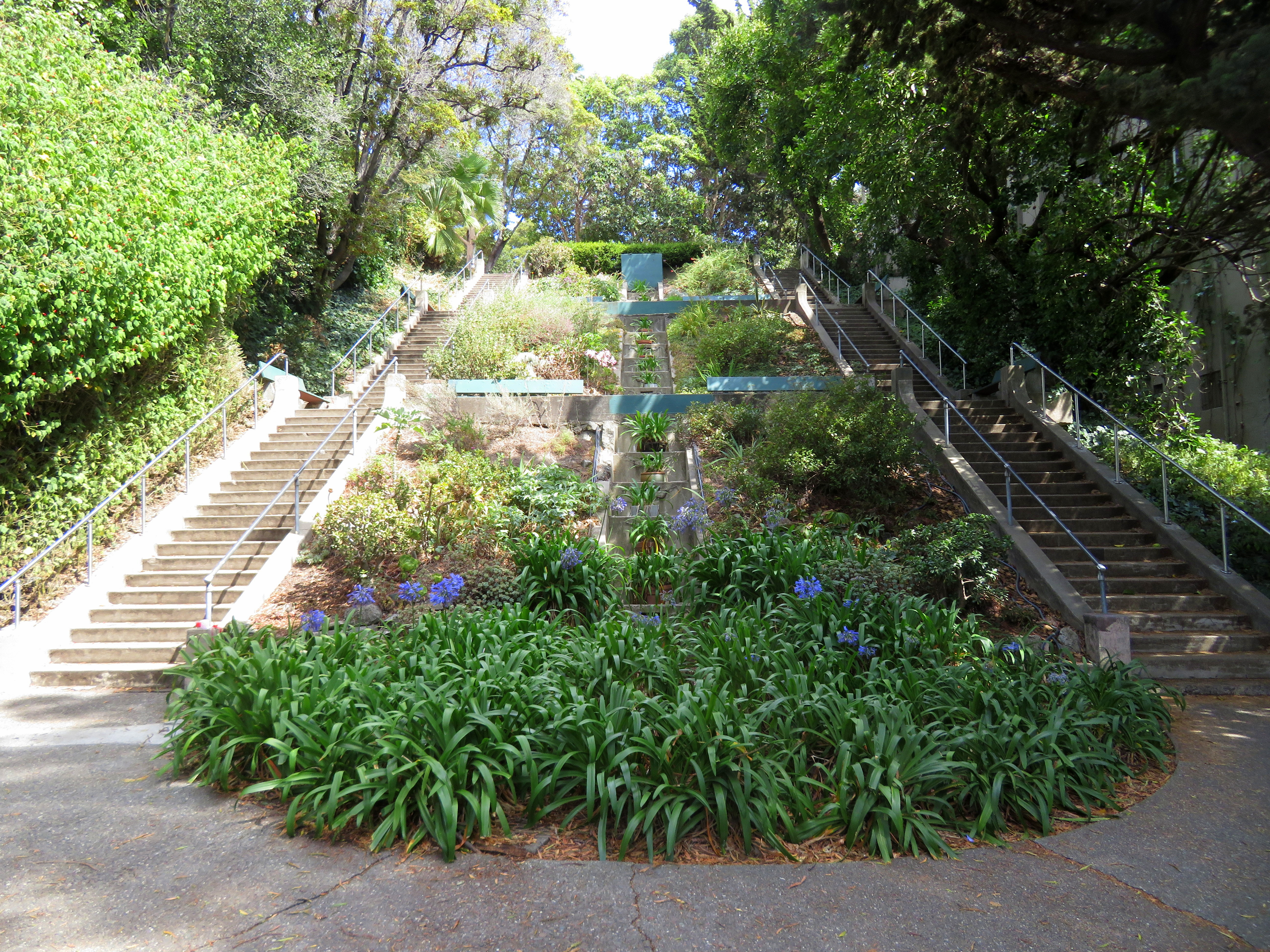
Cleveland Cascade in August 2020

The Cleveland Cascade is a 250-foot-long ornamental stairway near Lake Merritt in Oakland, California, with cascades in the center, designed in 1923 by Howard Gilkey. It opened with great civic pride as "one of the few things of this kind in the West".

== Description ==
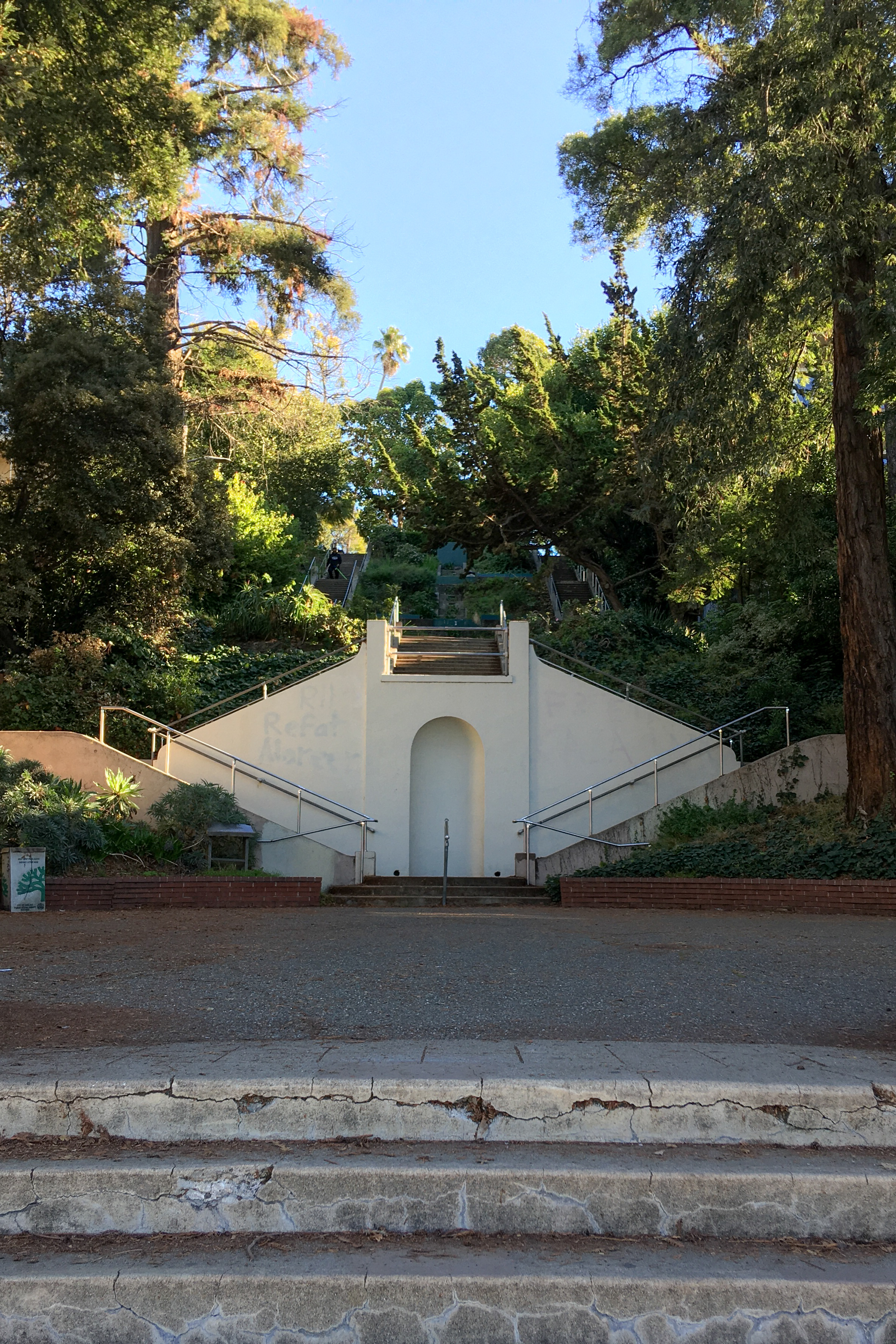
2 narrow stairways.

The Cascade was reportedly modeled after features in the hill towns of Italy. From the lakefront downhill end, wide concrete steps rise to a landing, then divide around a round-topped fountain niche and pool, and continue to the top following the middle landing as two narrow stairways on either side of a series of concrete bowls that form the cascade. Water flowed down over twenty concrete bowls past colored lights.

It was adequately maintained into the early 1940s but then began to suffer from neglect and resulting disrepair. Until about 1950 the bowls were illuminated at night by colored lights, and an electric pump returned water from the pool to the top of the cascade. The lights and water were shut off sometime in the 1950s, and the bowls were filled in. As “Cleveland Stairs,” the Cascade never lost its popularity. The feature is an active pedestrian thoroughfare and popular with joggers.

== Renovation ==
The waterfalls remained in despair and were eventually completely covered by dirt. Their presence was first uncovered when old photos of the fountains were found, leading the community to excavate the site instead of arranging a park on top of it. Since 2004, efforts have been underway to restore the Cascade to its past glory. Local resident Barbara A. Tripner Newcombe (1923-2022) spearheaded the Friends of the Cleveland Cascade organization that managed the renovation.
