= David Hewes =

American businessman (1822–1915)

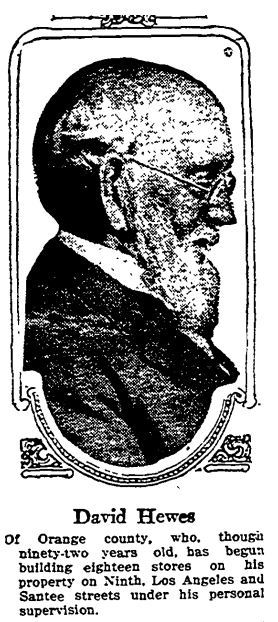
Hewes as portrayed in the Los Angeles Times, August 23, 1913

David Hewes (May 16, 1822 in Lynnfield, Massachusetts – July 23, 1915 in Orange, California), was an American born into one of the "old families" of Massachusetts that could be traced back seven generations to the patriot Joshua Hewes. Hewes is associated with the construction and completion of the First transcontinental railroad, although he was an enthusiastic supporter rather than being directly connected with the construction thereof. He provided a golden spike marking completion of the railroad and he also planned the connection of the railroad company's wires to Western Union.This allowed the taps of the silver hammer driving the golden spike at Promontory Summit, Utah Territory to be heard instantaneously coast-to-coast.

== Early life ==
Hewes supported himself from the age of fourteen and earned enough to pay for his education including entry into Phillips Academy, Andover and Yale College. During his second year at Yale he joined his savings with a small inheritance from his father investing the monies in galvanized iron houses that were shipped to California. He travelled by ship and arrived at San Francisco in February 1850 and later set up a general merchandise store in Sacramento. In 1852 Sacramento was devastated by fire and in early 1853 a flood leaving Hewes with little resources. Seeing San Francisco as a promising metropolis of the Pacific Coast he began a small-scale business of earth-moving as the city was leveling sand dunes and filling streets.

== San Francisco ==
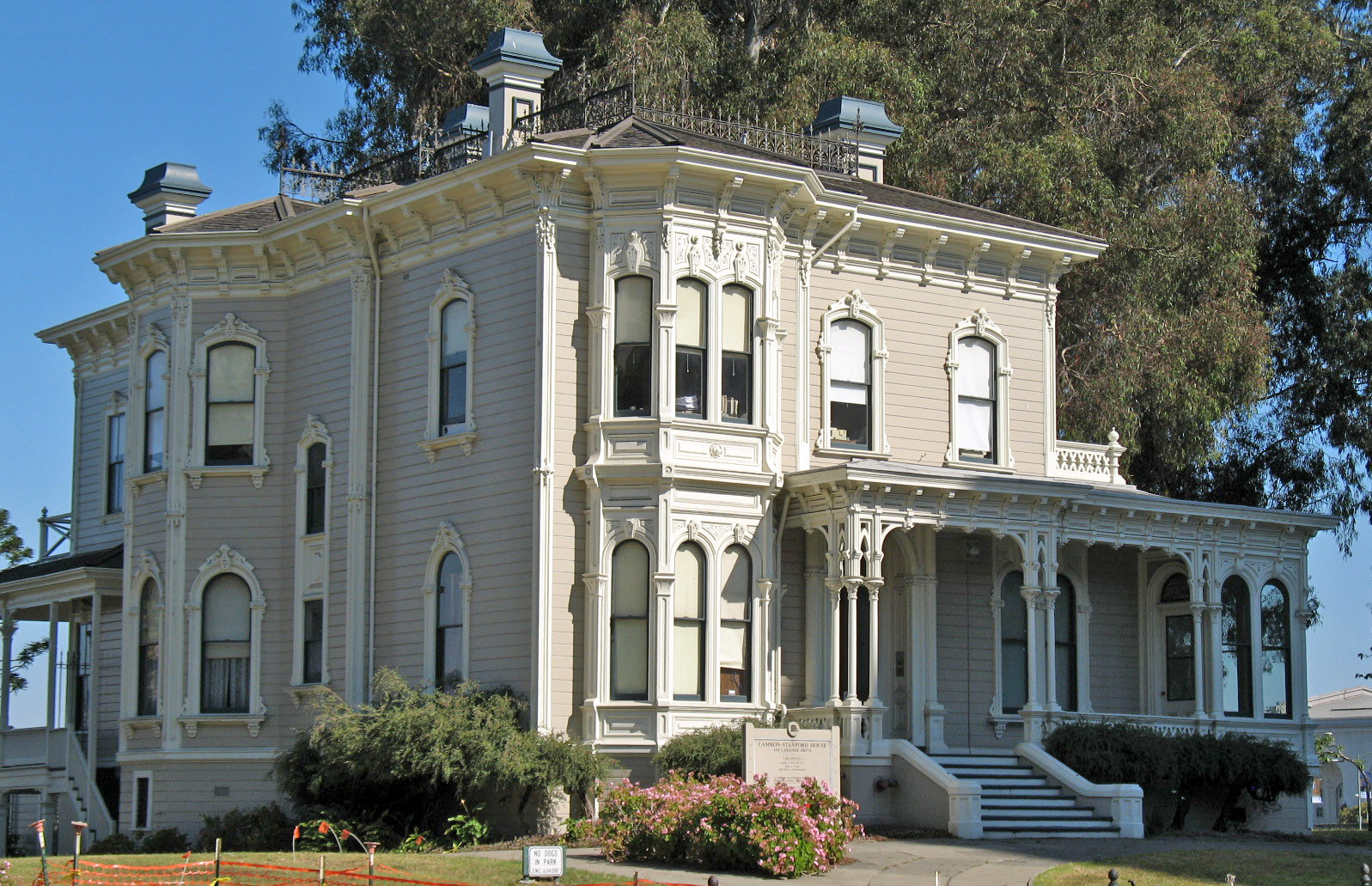
David Hewes and his wife, Matilda French, lived in the Camron-Stanford House in Oakland, California. The house still stands and is now a museum. It has a bust of Hewes and paintings of family members in its collection.

Hewes' Steam Paddy Company purchased steam shovels and then built the first steam locomotive on the Pacific Coast. He grew the enterprise to reclaiming the harbor, blocked by hundreds of abandoned ships from the gold rush, to level and fill the area where much of San Francisco's business district now stands. He was called the "maker of San Francisco" because it was through "his initiative and energy that the task was undertaken and accomplished". Hewes was invited to be a part of the Big Four (Central Pacific Railroad) but declined due to the financial risks, over his lifetime he gained and lost several fortunes. Hewes first marriage was to Matilda C. Gray in 1875 and they spent two and a half years in Europe. On the return trip Matilda's health necessitated that they move to a warmer climate. In 1881, they settled in Southern California, building a Victorian-styled mansion that still stands as a historical site in Tustin, CA. Matilda died in 1887. Hewes' second wife was Anna Lathrop, sister of Mrs. Leland Stanford. Married in 1889, they also travelled overseas and additionally to Europe they spent parts of their eighteen months in the Orient and Mid-East. Anna died soon after in August 1892.

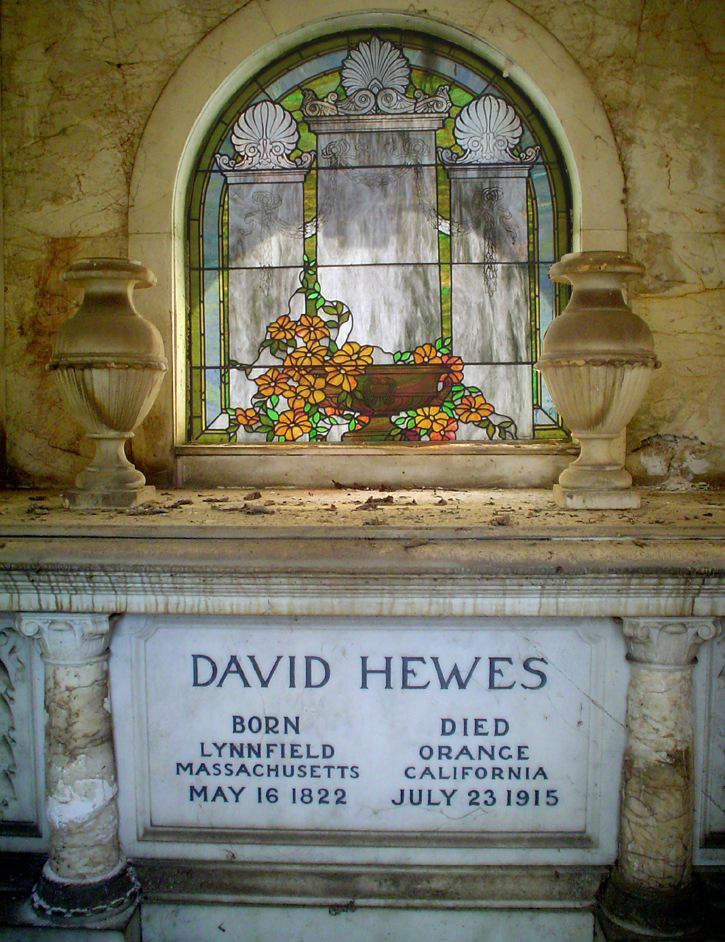
David Hewes' burial vault.

Hewes first started what arguably was his greatest accomplishment - the Hewes ranch near El Modena in Orange County when he moved there with Matilda. Called Anapauma, "a place of rest", it was a massive sheep ranch over 800 acres (3.2 km^{2}) with a large portion eventually converted in vineyards which later died off from blight. Hewes restored the ranch as a citrus farm which was one of the noted orange groves that stayed with the estate until 1920 when it was sold for $1,000,000. Hewes' art collection of pictures, statues and frescos was presented to the Leland Stanford Jr. University. He also created Hewes Park on what was once a barren hilltop.

== Personal life ==
Hewes became very interested in his family genealogy, especially his ancestor Lt. Joshua Hewes who had emigrated from England to the Massachusetts Bay colony in 1633. He commissioned Eben Putnam, a California genealogist, to collect and edit material for a Hewes family genealogy. This volume, privately published in 1913, includes a biography of David Hewes (pp. 191-205), an autobiography (pp. 225-264), an appendix with a transcription of the memorial booklet for Anna Lathrop Hewes, and an appendix with letters from his mother, and many photographs and paintings of Hewes and his family members, his house in Tustin, and advertisements and labels for the fruit produced by his ranch.

Hewes died in Orange, California in 1915 at the age of 93 and is buried at Mountain View Cemetery in Oakland.
