= Howard Gilkey =

American landscape architect (1890–1972)

- Born: Howard Ellsworth Gilkey; March 26, 1890; Winthrop, Iowa
- Died: September 12, 1972 (aged 82); Oakland, California
- Education: University of California at Berkeley
- Occupation: Architect
- Projects: Cleveland Cascade, Woodminster Amphitheatre, Mills College

Howard Ellsworth Gilkey (1890–1972) was an American landscape architect known for his civic works in Oakland, California and as a designer of garden shows.

== Early life and education ==
Howard Gilkey was born in Winthrop, Iowa, March 26, 1890. The first of the numerous turning points in his life came, when at the age of three, he moved with his parents to Tennessee, where he lived for five years. Their residence was an old Civil War blockhouse in Greenbriar, 30 miles north of Nashville.

At an early age, Howard taught himself to read by studying the ads on newspapers pasted on the walls upside down to serve as wallpaper. So far no one has come forward to dispute Howard’s claim to being the only person who learned to read while standing on his head. One of the first words he learned to spell was “beautiful.”

It was at this early period of his life that Howard’s natural love of flowers began to find expression. He loved to wander along the “spring branches” in search of wild flowers. He also made a collection of 40 kinds of wild seeds and bulbs. When he was 4 years old he put wild gentian and wild violet together and said he was “going to mix them.”

In 1898 the Gilkeys moved to Peoria, Ill., where they lived for four years. Howard completed grammar school before leaving Peoria. In 1902 the family moved to California and Howard was enrolled in the Santa Rosa High School.

In the spring of 1907, Will Lawrence, who was Luther Burbank's foreman, gave him a job operating a Norcross cultivator. These implements are familiarly known as “devil’s claws.” The operator walks backward and drags the cultivator after him.

Howard was put to work in a big plot of giant amaryllis. He broke off three of them. He was not fired as he expected to be, but worked for Burbank for two years doing most of the greenhouse work of seeding and planting. It was at this period that he did the cross pollenization work with spineless cactus as a result of the “bumble bee” conversation already recorded.

He worked for Burbank until the spring of 1909. In the fall of 1909 he resumed his interrupted studies in Santa Rosa High School, graduating in 1911, the only boy honor student in his class.

He went to Berkeley to attend U.C., paying his way by taking orders for bulbs for a new variety of gladiolus. Bulbs for these flowers had been given him by Burbank. Completed his studies at UC Berkeley in 1916.

== Career ==
During 1914 and 1915, while he was attending the University of California—he was graduated in 1916—he acted as assistant to a landscape designer who was superintendent of horticulture for the Panama Pacific International Exhibition.

Gilkey was twice associated with Mills College, first as an instructor in 1916 and 1917, and later, from 1922 to 1926, as consultant for landscaping and gardening on campus.

During World War I he was an assistant engineer in charge of orders and requisitions for the planning department of the firm engaged in construction of shipyards in Alameda.

For 18 months, in 1919 and 1920, Gilkey served as a payroll clerk for the Oakland Board of Education. Later he served on a year’s appointment as a substitute high school teacher in the Oakland Public Schools.

In 1921 and 1922, he was city park engineer and acting city planning engineer for the City of Oakland. From 1923 onward Gilkey as devoted his time to the private practice of his profession. He held many commissions throughout the state connected with public parks and institutions.

The Cleveland Cascade project was developed during his tenure as city parks engineer and opened in March 1923. It featured over 20 cascading bowls for water to flow through along with multi-colored electric lighting (photo)

For a number of years he was consultant for the Alameda County Institutions Commission, planning and supervising the landscaping of the grounds of Highland-Alameda County and Fairmont hospitals as well as other public institutions.

In the early 1930s he served as work-relief employee of the WPA and supervised a project employing 3500 persons engaged in the renovation of Golden Gate Park in San Francisco. Later he was associated for a time with Golden Gate International Exposition.

As a member of the Woodminster Committee of the California Writers Club, he did much of the early planning which resulted in the Woodminster Amphitheatre & Cascade (photo) at Joaquin Miller Park

Starting in the late 1920s Gilkey became involved with a group of prominent Oakland businessmen and was one of the four founders of the Business Men's Garden Club of Oakland, which was organized on January 15, 1930. The other three organizers were Harold Austin, James Cobbledick and George Furniss.

The desire to create a garden show resulted in the first annual California Spring Garden Show, held in 1930 in the Earl G. Anthony Building.

He has been connected with this annual show in an official capacity, save for two years, 1935 and 1936. On his return in 1937 the theme was Nature’s Gardens. In 1944 and 1945 the annual shows were suspended, Howard went into war work, as an engineer and draughtsman. Observation of the prefabrication of ship parts while he worked as a marine draughtsman at Kaiser No. 3 Yard in Richmond gave him the idea of prefabrication features of the 1946 garden show.

The club developed the California Spring Garden Shows, which were some of the biggest on the West Coast during this time. "Mr. Gilkey was best known for his work with the Garden Show, staging the first one and establishing a tradition of spectacular redwood trees and waterfalls known throughout the west."

The shows, and Gilkey, were the subject of a Saturday Evening Post issue in October 1950 with the subtitle “The fellows think nothing of rebuilding a redwood forest or a mountain cataract. Navlet said the article “made a national figure of Howard, and drew attention of the world to the great shows he created.”

== Awards ==
He was the first western landscape designer named a member of the American Society of Landscape Architects, and his many honors included being named “Man of the Year” for 1963 by the Oakland Eastbay Garden Center, an association of 55 Garden Clubs.

== Projects ==
- Cleveland Cascade
- Mills College
- Woodminster Amphitheater and Cascade
- the original duck pond on Lake Merritt
- Knowland State Park arboretum
- Lakeside Drive, Oakland
- Highland Hospital grounds
