= Samuel Merritt =

American physician, businessman, and mayor Delta Phi Kappa

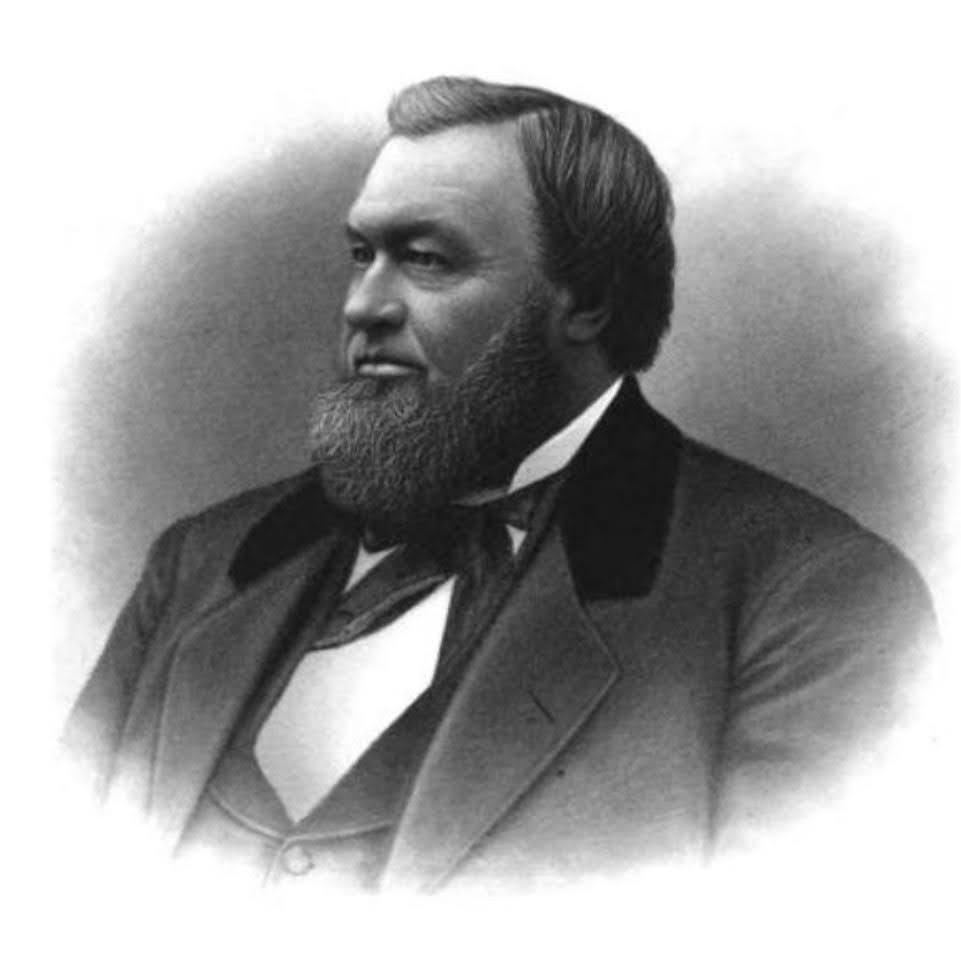

13th Mayor of Oakland
- In office November 3, 1867 – February 18, 1869
- Preceded by: William Watrus Crane, Jr.
- Succeeded by: John B. Felton

Personal details
- Born: March 30, 1822 Harpswell, Maine, U.S.
- Died: August 17, 1890 (aged 68) Oakland, California, U.S.
- Education: Bowdoin College

Samuel Merritt (1822–1890) was an American physician and the 13th mayor of Oakland, California, from 1867 to 1869. He was a founding Regent of the University of California (1868–1874). He was also a shipmaster and a very successful businessman. He died in 1890 at age 68, with a reputation as the richest man in Oakland.

== Early years ==
Merritt was born in 1822 in Harpswell, Maine, within Casco Bay. As the youngest of five children of Stephen and Joanna (Purington) Merritt, in addition to schooling, he learned some fishing, helped to build ships, and helped in other functions of a mariner. In 1844 he graduated from the Medical School of Maine at Bowdoin College. After practising medicine in Plymouth, Massachusetts, for three years, Dr. Merritt, at Daniel Webster's urging, decided to join the California gold rush. He borrowed heavily from his brother Isaac, bought the 140-ton brig Reindeer, filled it with general supplies, and embarked on his voyage in 1849 as the navigator.

According to the Port of San Francisco, the brig Reindeer arrived on 5 May 1850, 153 days from New York, with assorted cargo for Merritt. Because of a fire in San Francisco days prior to his arrival, he sold his consignment quickly for a handsome profit. Moreover, he chartered his brig for $800 a month, carrying passengers and cargo to and from Humboldt Bay, which started his trading business. Meanwhile, he continued through the 1850s his medical practice near the San Francisco berths, with his physician's office listed for six years at Room No. 7 in the Express Building at the corner of Montgomery and California Streets.

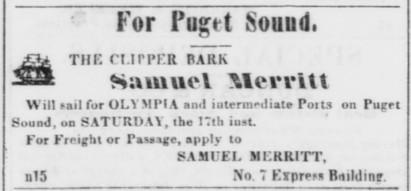
Ad in Daily Alta California (Nov 1855). His namesake bark, Samuel Merritt (130 feet long, 28 feet beam, 333 tons) was built in Bath, Maine, for his lumber trade.

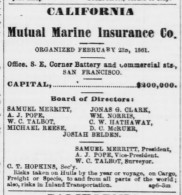
Insurance Co. established by Samuel Merritt in 1861; he was its 1st president and remained a director for the rest of his life.

He went back to Bath, Maine, a center for shipbuilding, to visit family in 1853, and commissioned two new barks (including his namesake, Samuel Merritt, 1855), built to his model designed specifically for the coastal lumber trade. When he was called back to Bath, Maine, in 1862 to settle his brother Issac's estate, he contracted for three more sailing ships (Deacon, 1863; Vidette, 1865; Oakland, 1865), all built to his design for trading. After running each ship for a handsome profit, he sold the ships themselves at prices greater than their costs.

In 1852 Merritt began a series of lucrative real estate transactions in San Francisco. He also bought land in what is now the city of Oakland and moved there in 1863.

== Later years ==
As mayor of the rapidly growing town of Oakland (1867-1869), Merritt knew that it was crucial to establish the West Coast railhead of the Pacific Railroad in Oakland itself to secure its future economic viability. To achieve this goal, he and his contemporaries resolved complicated and long-standing disputes over tideland ownership through legal maneuvers, negotiated with railroad companies, and navigated a series of compromise waterfront arrangements in spring 1868. "They secure to Oakland the terminus of the greatest work of the age, the Pacific Railroad". As the compromise ordinance was approved on April 1, cynics called it an April Fool's Day trick. As Oakland was an across-the-bay suburb of San Francisco, the press dubbed it the "future Jersey City of the Pacific Coast".

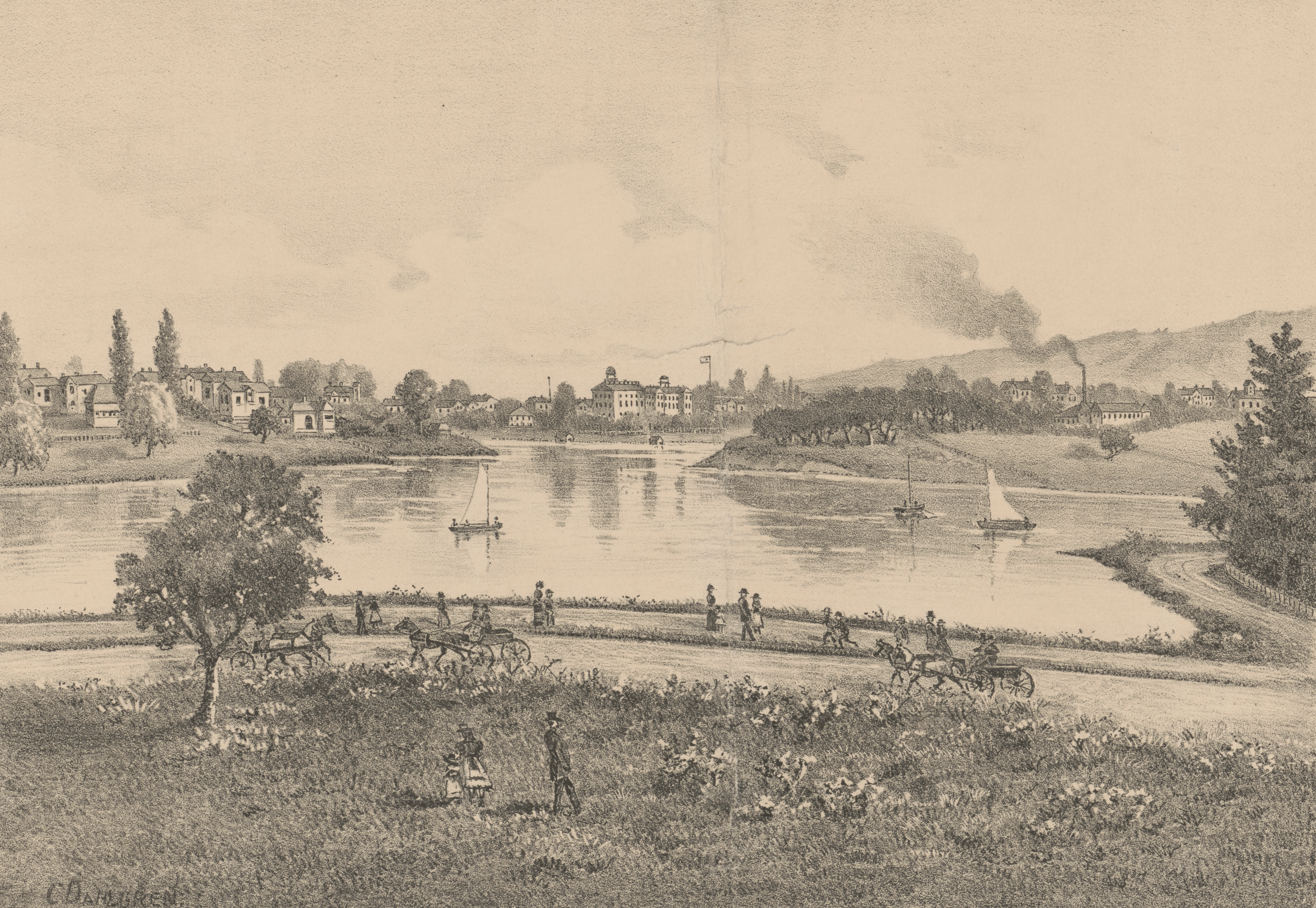
Lake Merritt, Oakland, California (1899) was the tidewater lake Samuel Merritt had created by building a dam across the estuary at 12th Street in 1868

In 1867, he donated 155 acres (627,000 m^{2}) of tidal water from the headwaters of Indian Slough to the Bay. As part of his mayoral waterfront compromises in Spring 1868, he orchestrated (and donated $18,000 toward) a public work dam across the San Antonio Slough estuary at 12th Street, turning the tidal lagoon into a lake at the high-tide level, which became known first as "Merritt's Lake" and later as Lake Merritt. Lake Merritt is historically significant as the United States' first official wildlife refuge, designated in 1870 at his urging. It also has been listed as a National Historic Landmark since 1963, and on the National Register of Historic Places since 1966.

As mayor, "he introduced or supported many progressive ideas: the city's first municipal water supply; its first public health department; and a subscription library that was the forerunner of Oakland's first public library..." --Beth Bagwell (1982)

In May 1868, Merritt was appointed as a regent by Governor Haight to the founding Board of Regents of the then-nascent University of California. He served as a regent until June 1874. Merritt resigned from the board after a two-month investigation by the California State Assembly's public building committee which held him responsible for the young university's very first corruption scandal. The committee concluded that Merritt had profited financially from selling an inferior building to the university at an exorbitant cost, at $24,000 over its reasonable value. Even though the Board of Regents had enacted a resolution against self-dealing in the construction of campus buildings in June 1872, Merritt in his capacity as chair of the regents' building committee had awarded the contract for the construction of the original College of Letters building (North Hall) at the Berkeley campus to his preferred contractor, Power and Ough—who then obtained most of the needed lumber and cement from a lumber company in Oakland owned by Merritt.

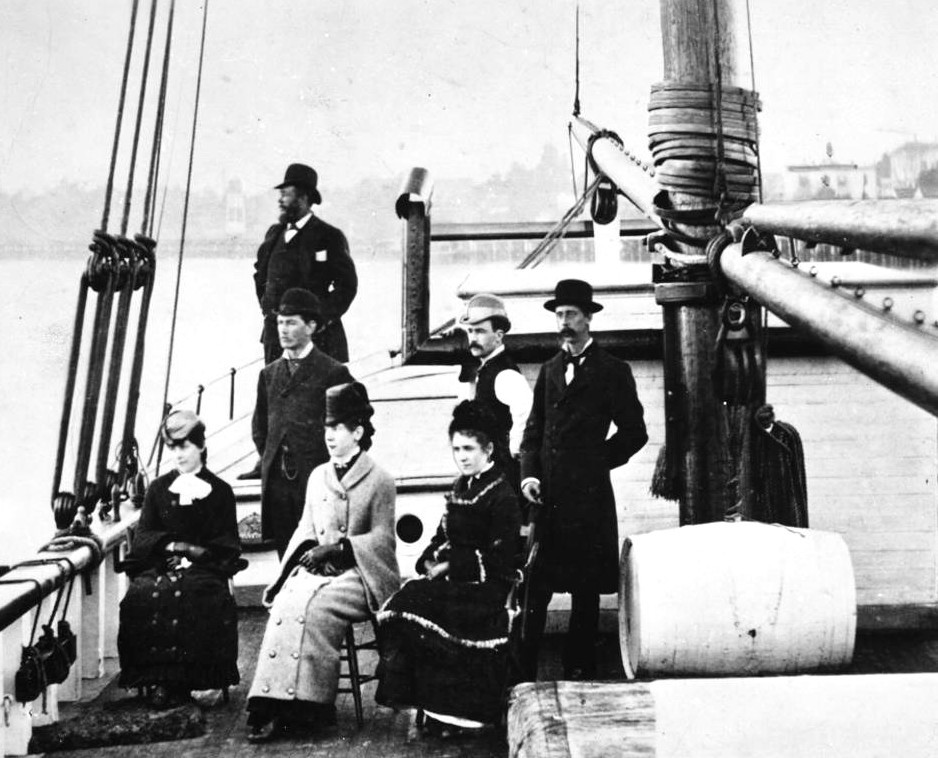
1888: Samuel Merritt (top, standing) aboard his yacht Casco with Robert Louis Stevenson (right, standing) and his party, probably taken June 1888 before Stevenson and his party sailed to the South Sea.

With the sea in his blood, Dr. Merritt launched in 1878 his 72-ton keel schooner yacht, Casco, built under his supervision after a model of his own and named for the Casco Bay of his boyhood. It was the largest pleasure craft on the Pacific. In 1880 Merritt undertook a four month voyage in Casco to the South Seas, visiting the Hawaiian islands and Tahiti. His yacht was commanded by Captain Colcord and his party included a photographer, I. W. Taber; a journalist, T. T. Dargie of the Oakland Tribune; and four lady guests. Two years later, he launched onto his Lake the first sharpie on the Pacific coast. Robert Louis Stevenson, who chartered Merritt's Casco ($750/month plus expenses) from Summer 1888 to Spring 1889, was delighted with the sailing qualities of the schooner yacht in the South Seas.

"I was the showman of the Casco. She, her fine lines, tall spars and snowy decks, the crimson fittings of the saloon, and the white, the gilt, and the repeating mirrors of the tiny cabin, brought us a hundred visitors. The men fathomed out her dimensions with their arms, as their fathers fathomed out the ships of Cook; the women declared the cabins more lovely than a church..." --Robert Louis Stevenson, on his first encounter with the Marquesans (July 1888)

In early August 1890, Merritt sailed to Sausalito one last time in his yacht Casco, but he was too weak and had to return to Oakland in a steamer.

== Death and legacy ==
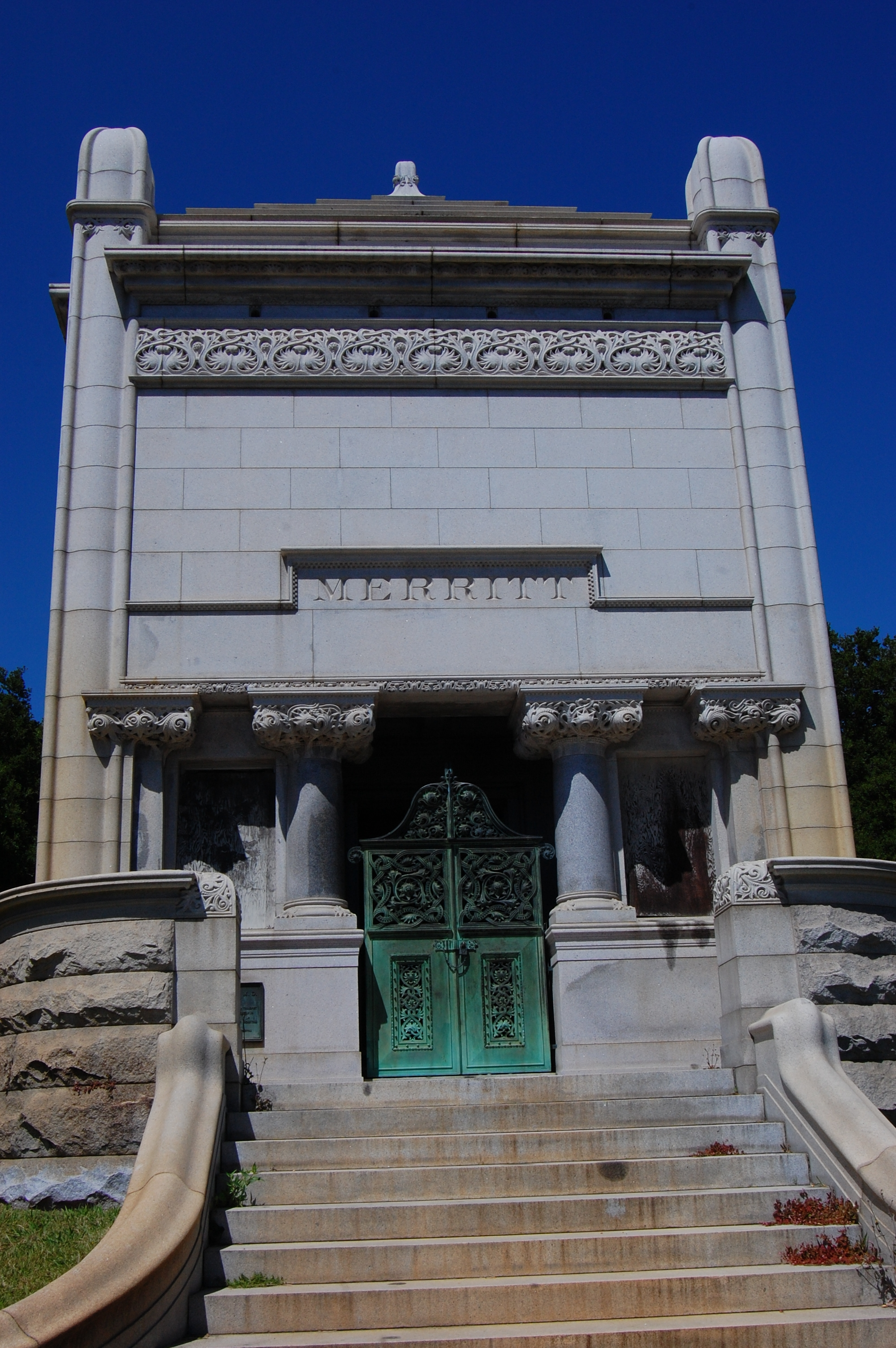
Tomb

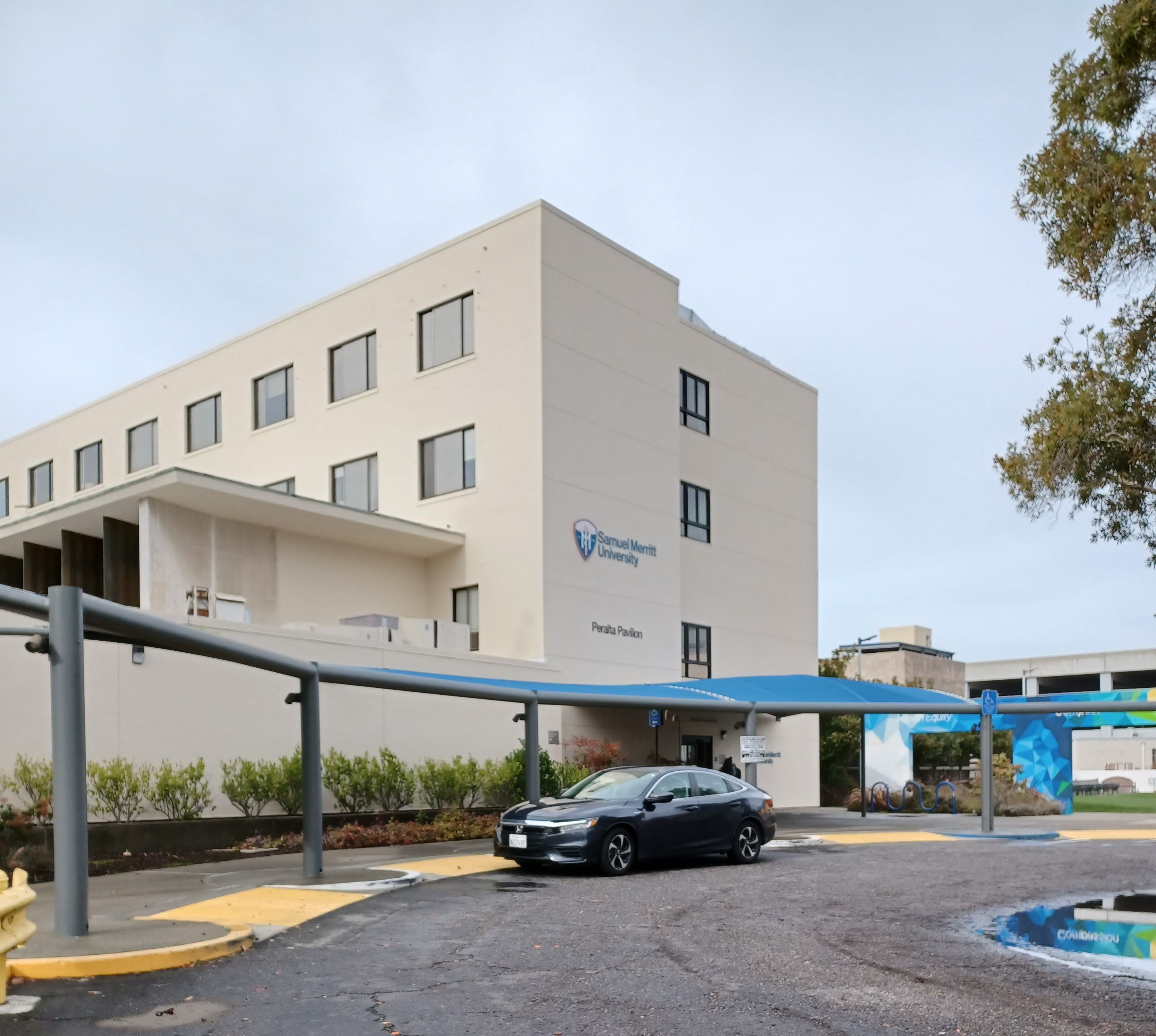
Samuel Merritt University

Dr Merritt died in August 1890 at age 68, in his Oakland residence in the block bounded by Madison, Jackson, Fourteenth and Fifteenth streets, with an estate of over $2,000,000 and the reputation of being the most affluent man in Oakland. He was buried in Mountain View Cemetery in Oakland.

His namesake Lake Merritt "stands as the jewel of Oakland, even crowned with lights."

He left plans for a hospital and nursing school to be built in his name after his death. In 1909, Samuel Merritt University and Merritt Hospital opened.

Political offices
Preceded by William Watrus Crane, Jr.	13th Mayor of Oakland; November 3, 1867-February 18, 1869	Succeeded by John B. Felton
