= Richmond, California =

- City
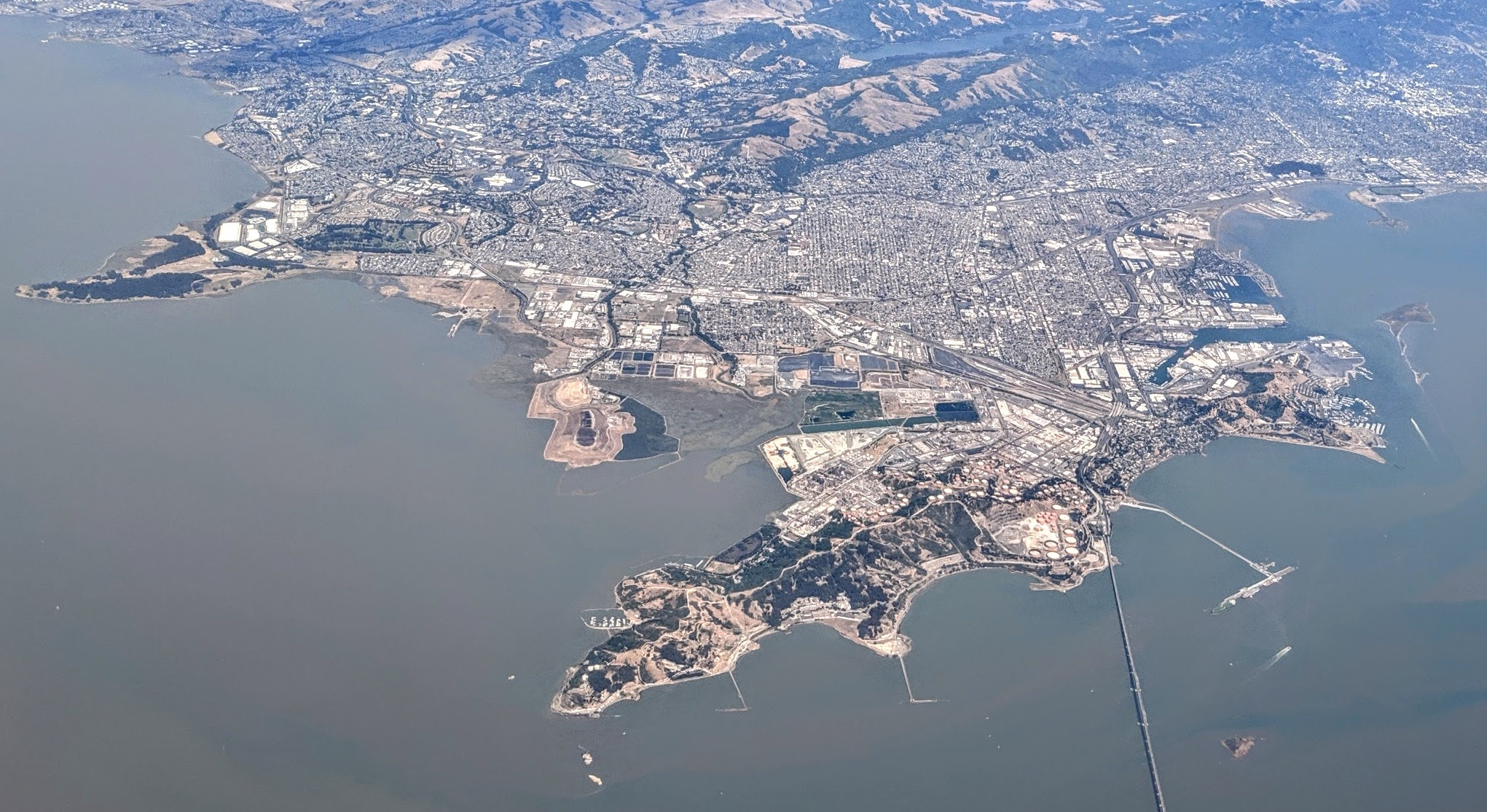
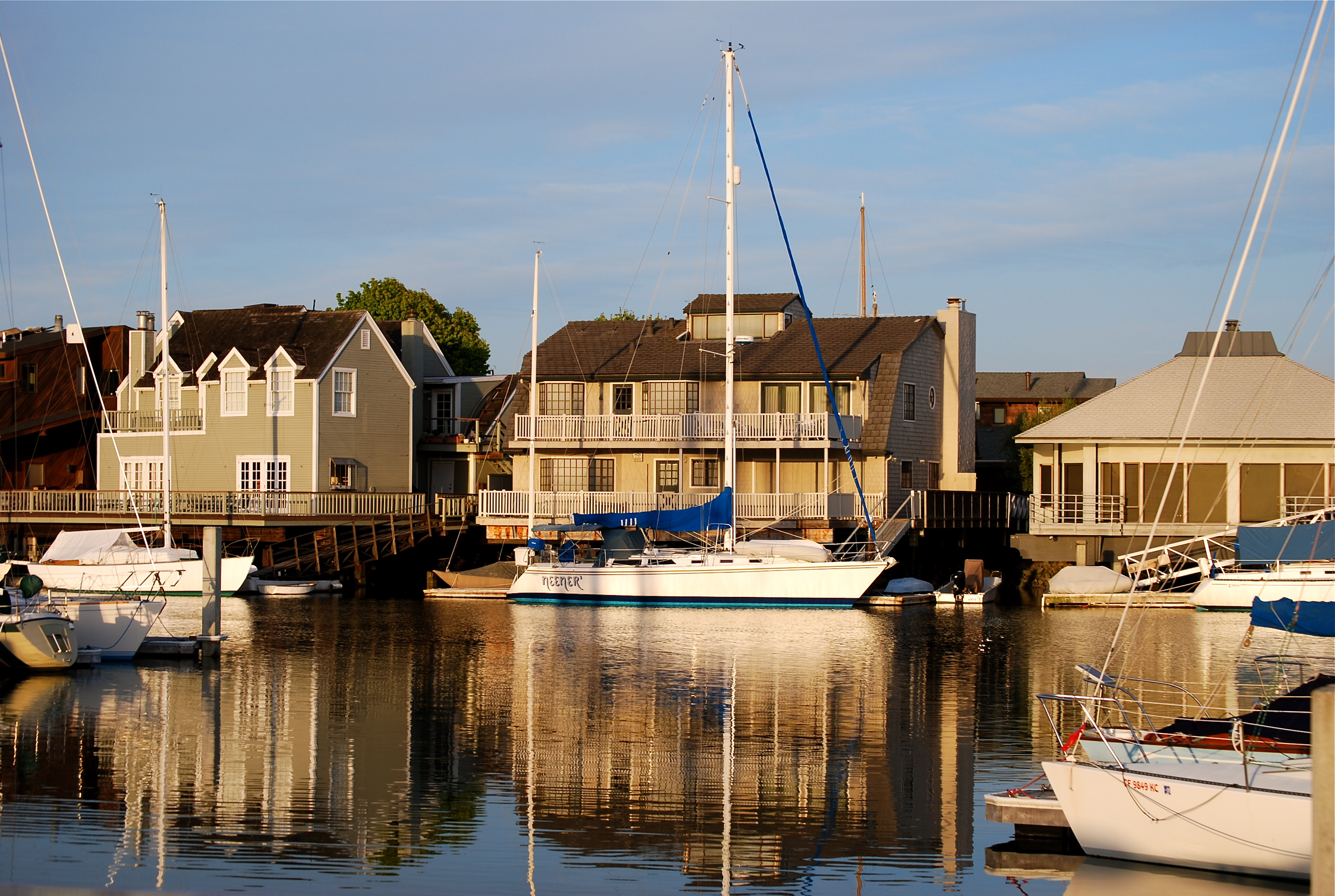
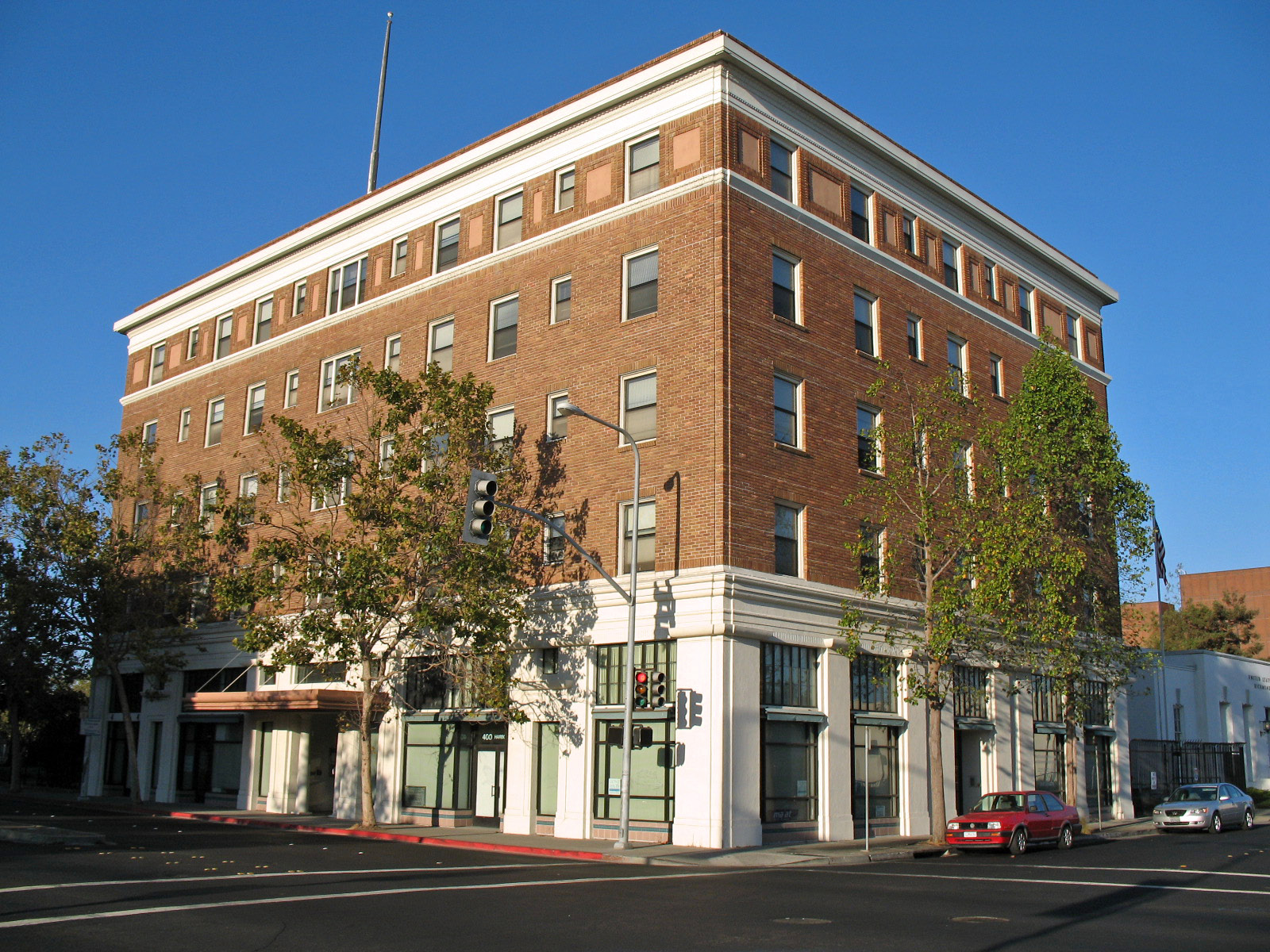
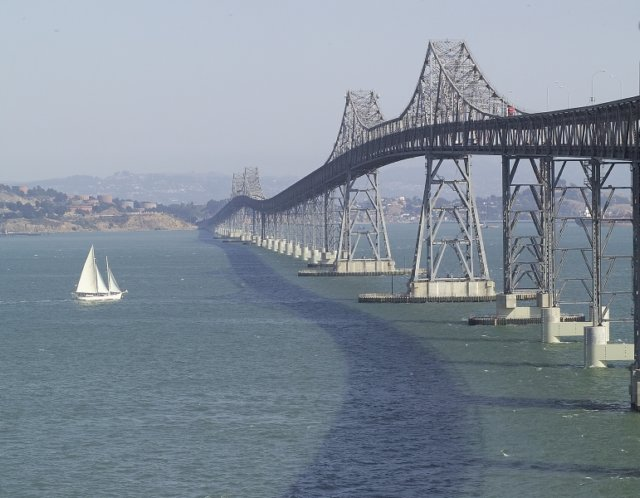
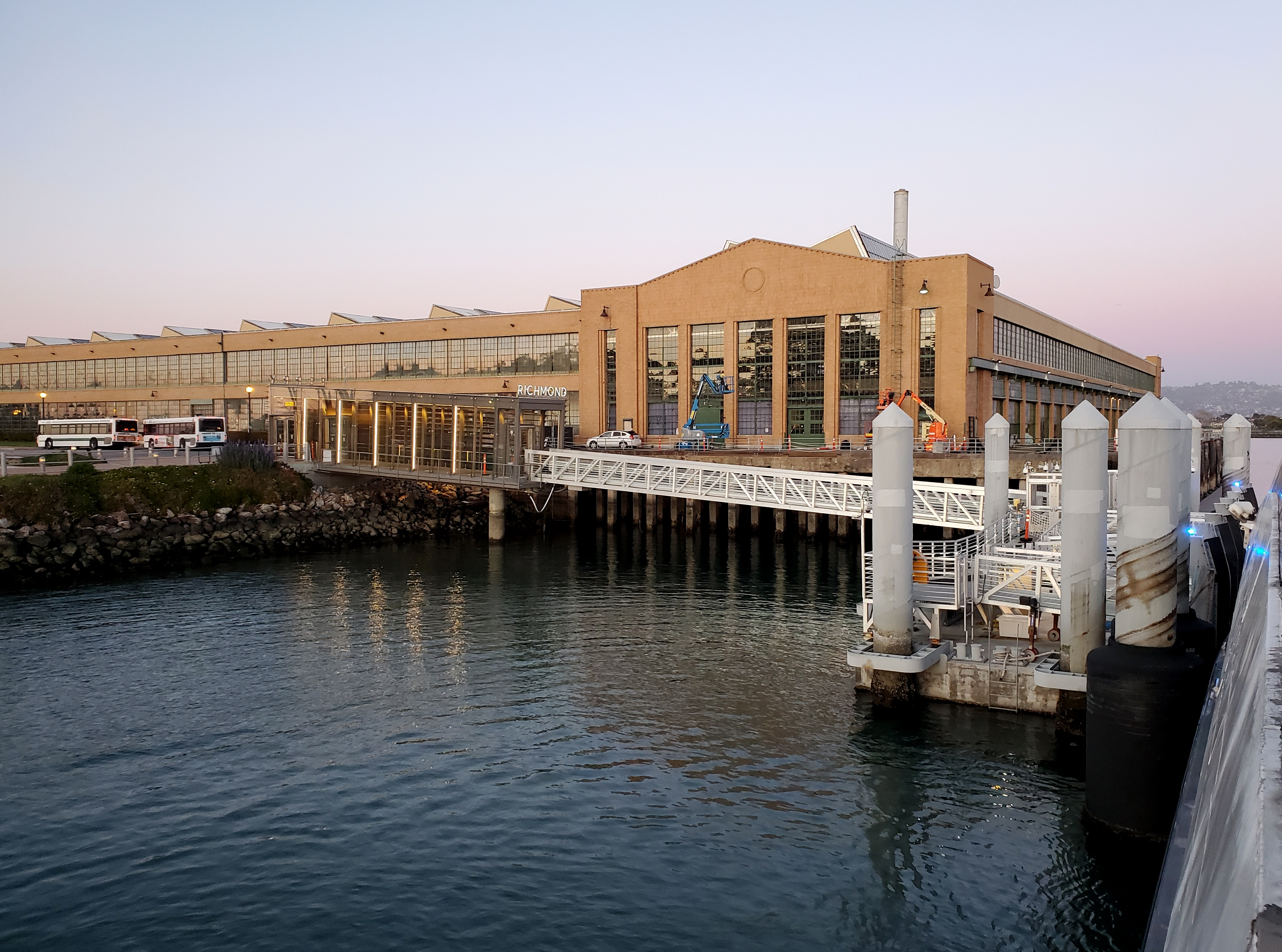
- Aerial view of Richmond Point Richmond New Hotel Carquinez Richmond-San Rafael Bridge Richmond Ferry Terminal

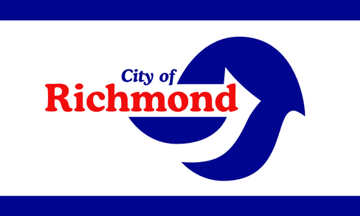
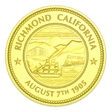
- Flag Seal
- Motto: The City of Pride and Purpose
- Interactive map of Richmond, California
- Location in the United States Richmond, California (California) Richmond, California (the United States)
- Coordinates: 37°56′09″N 122°20′52″W
- Country: United States
- State: California
- County: Contra Costa
- Incorporated: August 3, 1905
- Named for: Richmond, Virginia, U.S.

Government
  - Type: Council-Manager
  - Body: City council
  - Mayor: Eduardo Martinez
  - Supervisor: District 1: John Gioia
  - State senator: Jesse Arreguín (D)
  - Assemblymember: Buffy Wicks (D)
  - U. S. rep.: John Garamendi (D)

Area
  - City: 52.51 sq mi (136.00 km^{2})
  - Land: 30.05 sq mi (77.84 km^{2})
  - Water: 22.46 sq mi (58.16 km^{2}) 42.77%
- Elevation: 46 ft (14 m)

Population (2020)
  - City: 116,448
  - Rank: 2nd in Contra Costa County; 54th in California
  - Density: 3,870/sq mi (1,496/km^{2})
  - Metro: 4,648,486
- Time zone: UTC−8 (Pacific)
  - Summer (DST): UTC−7 (PDT)
- ZIP codes: 94801, 94802, 94804, 94805, 94807, 94808, 94850
- Area code: 510, 341
- FIPS code: 06-60620
- GNIS IDs: 1659507, 2410939
- Website: ci.richmond.ca.us

Richmond is a city in western Contra Costa County, California, United States. The city was incorporated on August 3, 1905, and has a city council. Located in the San Francisco Bay Area's East Bay region, Richmond borders San Pablo, Albany, El Cerrito and Pinole in addition to the unincorporated communities of North Richmond, Hasford Heights, Kensington, El Sobrante, Bayview-Montalvin Manor, Tara Hills, and East Richmond Heights, and for a short distance San Francisco on Red Rock Island in the San Francisco Bay.

Richmond is one of two cities, the other being San Rafael, that sits on the shores of both San Francisco Bay and San Pablo Bay. Its population was 116,448 as of the 2020 United States census making it the second largest city in the United States named Richmond after Richmond, Virginia.

== Etymology ==
The name "Richmond" predates incorporation of the city by more than fifty years. Edmund Randolph, originally from Richmond, Virginia, represented the city of San Francisco when California's first legislature met in San Jose in December 1849, and he became state assemblyman from San Francisco. Out of fondness for his hometown, Randolph persuaded a federal surveying party, surveying and mapping the San Francisco Bay, to place the names "Point Richmond" and "Richmond" on their 1854 geodetic coastal map. The map was used at the terminal selected by the San Francisco and San Joaquin Valley Railroad. By 1899 maps made by the railroad carried the name "Point Richmond Avenue", a county road that later became Barrett Avenue, a central street in Richmond. The Atchison, Topeka and Santa Fe Railroad purchased the railroad making their terminus at Richmond. The first post office opened in 1900, and the city of Richmond incorporated in 1905.

== History ==
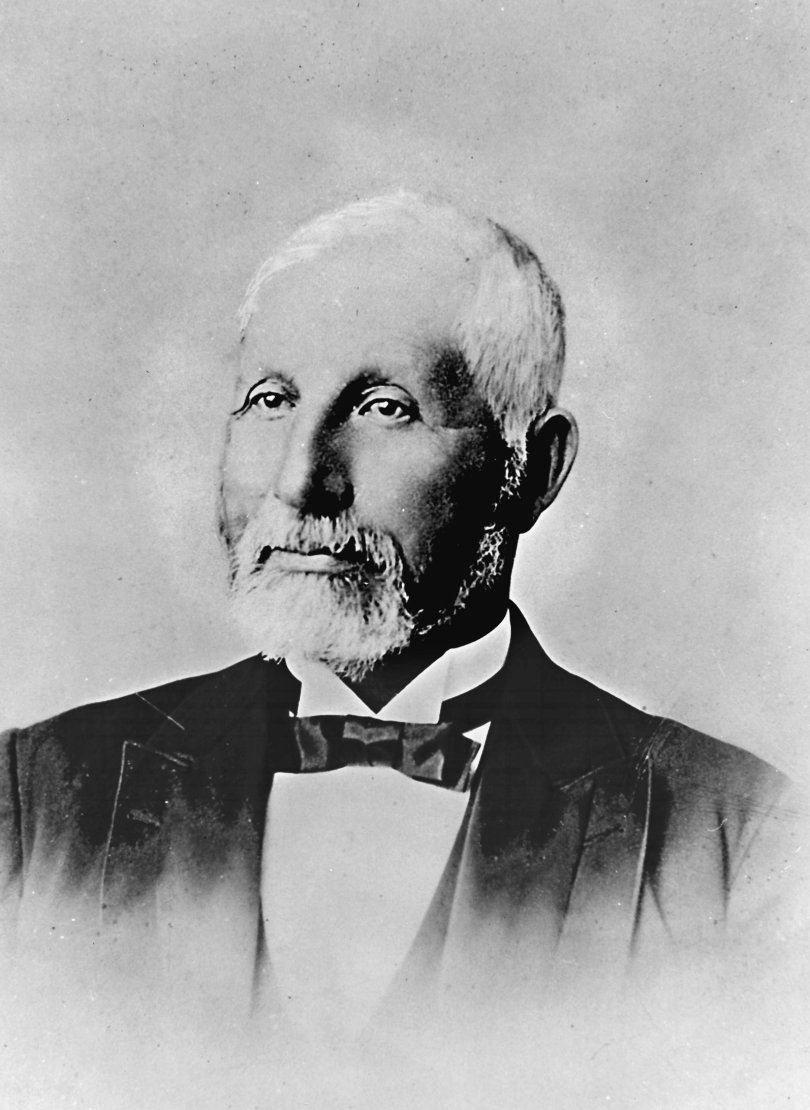
Richmond was originally part of Rancho San Pablo, a Mexican-era rancho granted to Francisco María Castro in 1823 and reconfirmed to his son Don Víctor Castro, a noted Californio ranchero and politician (pictured), in 1834.

The Ohlone were the first inhabitants of the Richmond area, settling an estimated 5,000 years ago. They spoke the Chochenyo language, and subsisted as hunter-gatherers and harvesters.

=== Origins ===
The site that would eventually become the city of Richmond was part of the Rancho San Pablo land granted to Don Francisco María Castro, from which the nearby town of San Pablo inherited its name; the Point Richmond area was known originally as The Potrero and then renamed as Point Stevens in early charts of San Francisco Bay. Point Richmond was an island, but industrial development and deliberate fill connected it to the mainland by the early 1900s.

On July 4, 1900, the Santa Fe Railroad's western terminus was established at Point Richmond with ferry connections from Ferry Point in the Brickyard Cove area to San Francisco. The Santa Fe railroad also built a major rail yard next to Point Richmond. It constructed a tunnel through the Potrero San Pablo ridge to run track from the yard to a ferry landing from which freight cars could be transshipped to San Francisco. Where this track crosses the main street in Point Richmond, there remain two of the last operational wigwag grade crossing signals in the United States, and the only surviving examples of the "upside-down" type. The wigwag is a type of railroad crossing signal that was phased out in the 1970s and '80s across the country. There was controversy in 2005 when the State Transportation Authority ordered the BNSF railroad company to upgrade the railroad crossing signals. A compromise was achieved that included installing new modern crossing gates, red lights and bells while not removing, but simply shutting off, the historic ones and preserving their functionality for special events.

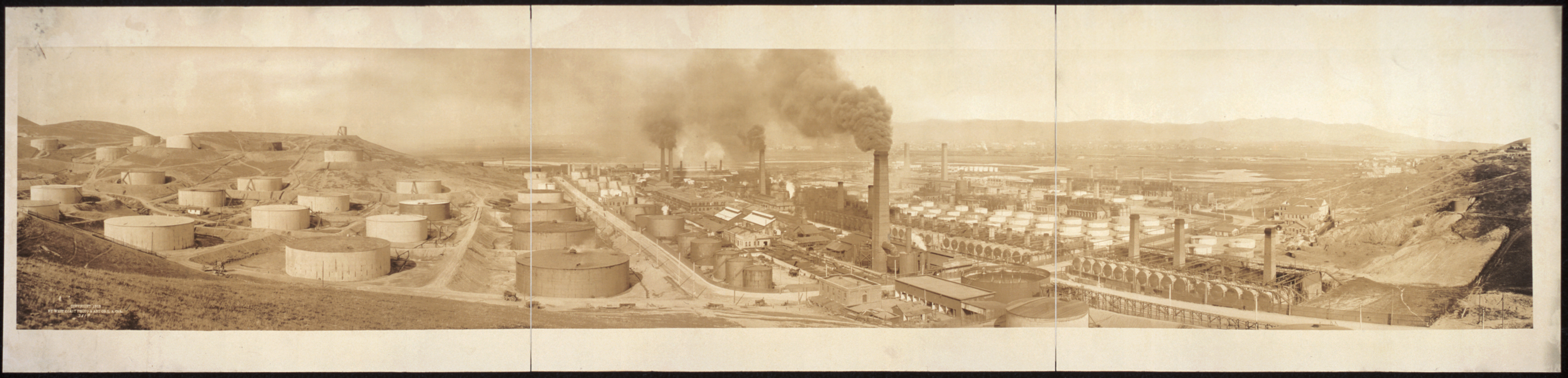
The Standard Oil refinery pictured in 1913.

Standard Oil set up operations on land sold by Emily Tewksbury in 1901, including what is now the Chevron Richmond Refinery and tank farm, which Chevron still operates. There is a pier into San Francisco Bay south of Point Molate for oil tankers.

=== Early days ===
The city of Richmond was incorporated in 1905. Until the enactment of prohibition in 1919, the city had the largest winery in the world; the small abandoned village of Winehaven remains fenced off along Western Drive in the Point Molate Area. Richmond was a small town at that time, with some industrial development centered on the waterfront based around the railroad and oil refineries.

The Pullman Company also established a major facility in Richmond in the early 20th century. The facility connected with both the Santa Fe and Southern Pacific and serviced their passenger coach equipment. The Pullman Company was a large employer of African American men, who worked mainly as porters on the Pullman cars. Many of them settled in the East Bay, from Richmond to Oakland, before World War II.

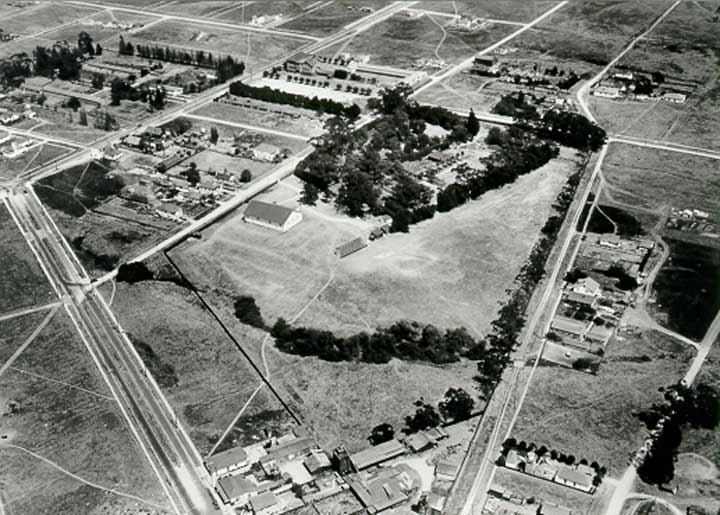
Southern Richmond in 1930, then known as the town of Stege, California

From 1917 and throughout the 1920s, the Ku Klux Klan was active in the city.

In 1930 the Ford Motor Company opened the Richmond Assembly Plant, which later moved to Milpitas in 1956. The old Ford plant in Richmond has been listed on the National Register of Historic Places since 1988. In 2004 it was purchased by developer Eddie Orton, who converted it into an events center named Ford Point Building–The Craneway.

=== Wartime boomtown and shifting demographics ===
At the onset of World War II, the four Richmond Shipyards were built along Richmond's waterfront, employing thousands of workers, many migrating to Richmond from other parts of the country after being recruited. These new workers generally lived in housing constructed specifically for the wartime boom, scattered throughout the San Francisco Bay Area, including Richmond, Berkeley and Albany. Many of these new migrants were Black Americans from the South and to a lesser extent the Midwest who took jobs in heavy industry and transport as those industries expanded to meet the needs of the war economy, while increased numbers of women also joined the industrial workforce for the first time as large numbers of working-age men were drafted for the war effort. During the war, Richmond's population increased dramatically, rising from 23,000 in 1940 to 114,899 in 1942 and peaking at around 120,000 by 1945.

A specially built rail line, the Shipyard Railway, transported workers to the shipyards. Kaiser's Richmond shipyards built 747 Victory and Liberty ships for the war effort, more than any other site in the U.S. The shipyards broke many records, including the completion of a Liberty ship in just five days. On average the yards built a new ship in 30 days.

The medical system established for the shipyard workers at the Richmond Field Hospital eventually became today's Kaiser Permanente HMO. The hospital remained in operation until 1993, when it was replaced by the Richmond Medical Center hospital, which has since expanded to a multi-building campus.

Point Richmond was Richmond's original commercial hub, but a new downtown arose in the center of the city along Macdonald Avenue during the war. It was populated by department stores such as Kress, J.C. Penney, Sears, Macy's, and Woolworth's.

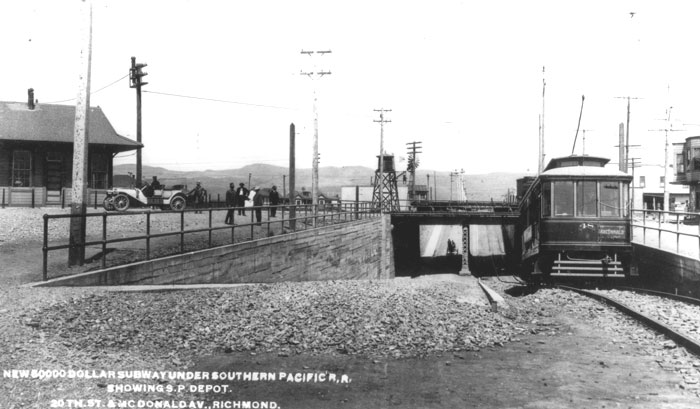
An E&SR streetcar in the Macdonald Avenue subway in downtown Richmond, 1906

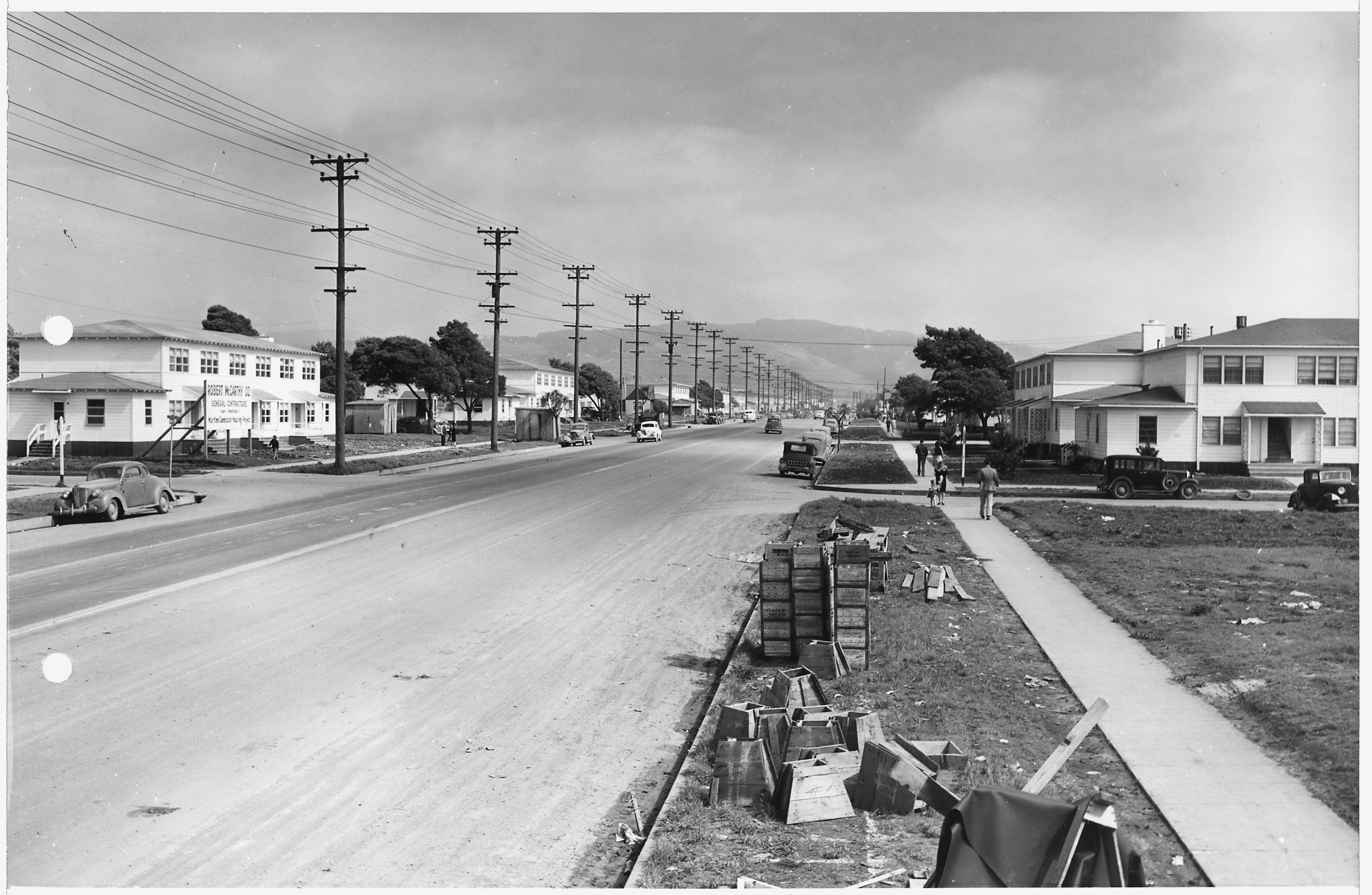
A 4,000-unit housing project was completed in Richmond during 1943.

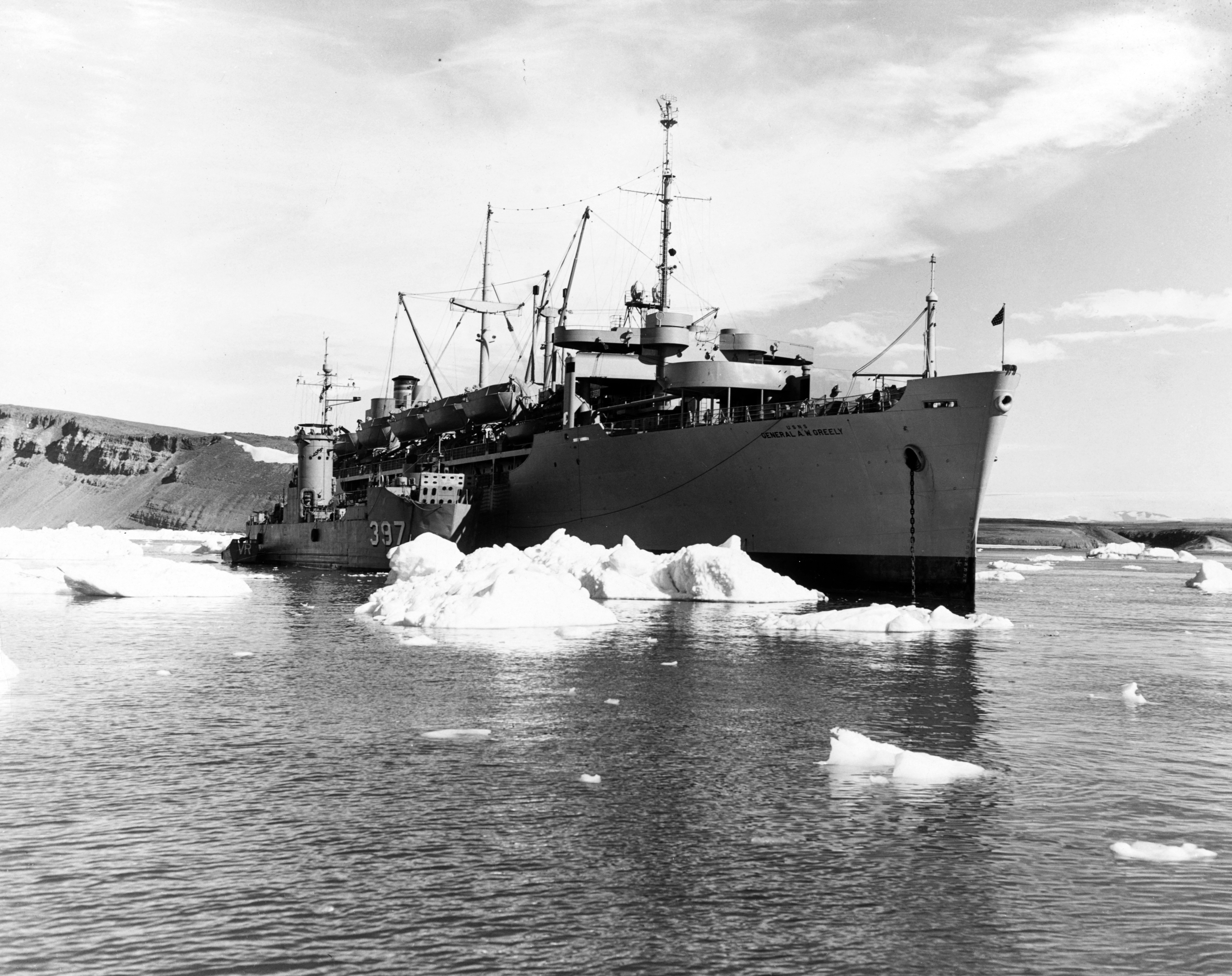
USS General A. W. Greely, built in Richmond

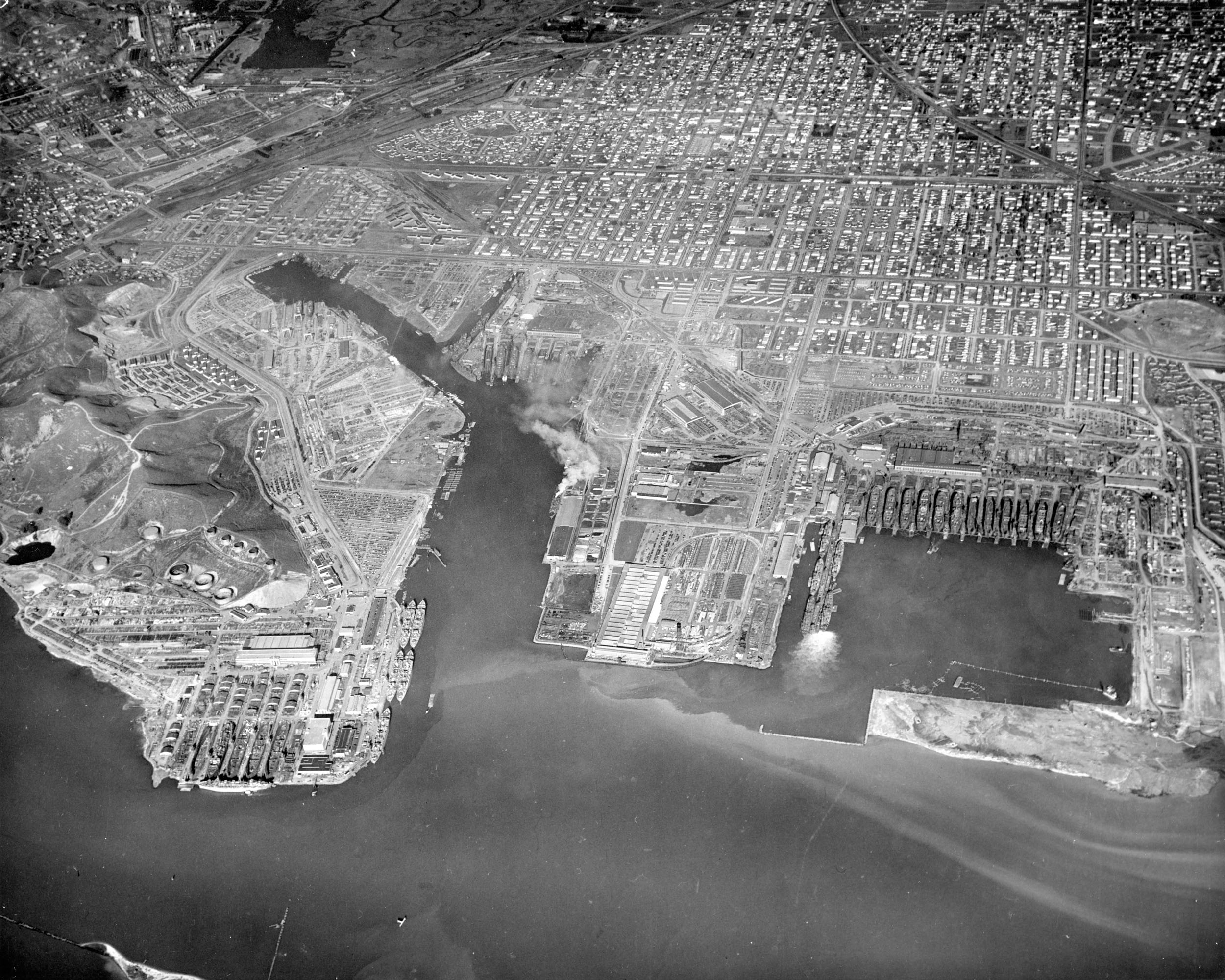
Aerial photo of Richmond Shipyards, 1944, view directed north: #3 (west, foreground); #2 (rectangular basin, east foreground); #4 (end of the channel, south bank); #1 (north of the channel bend).

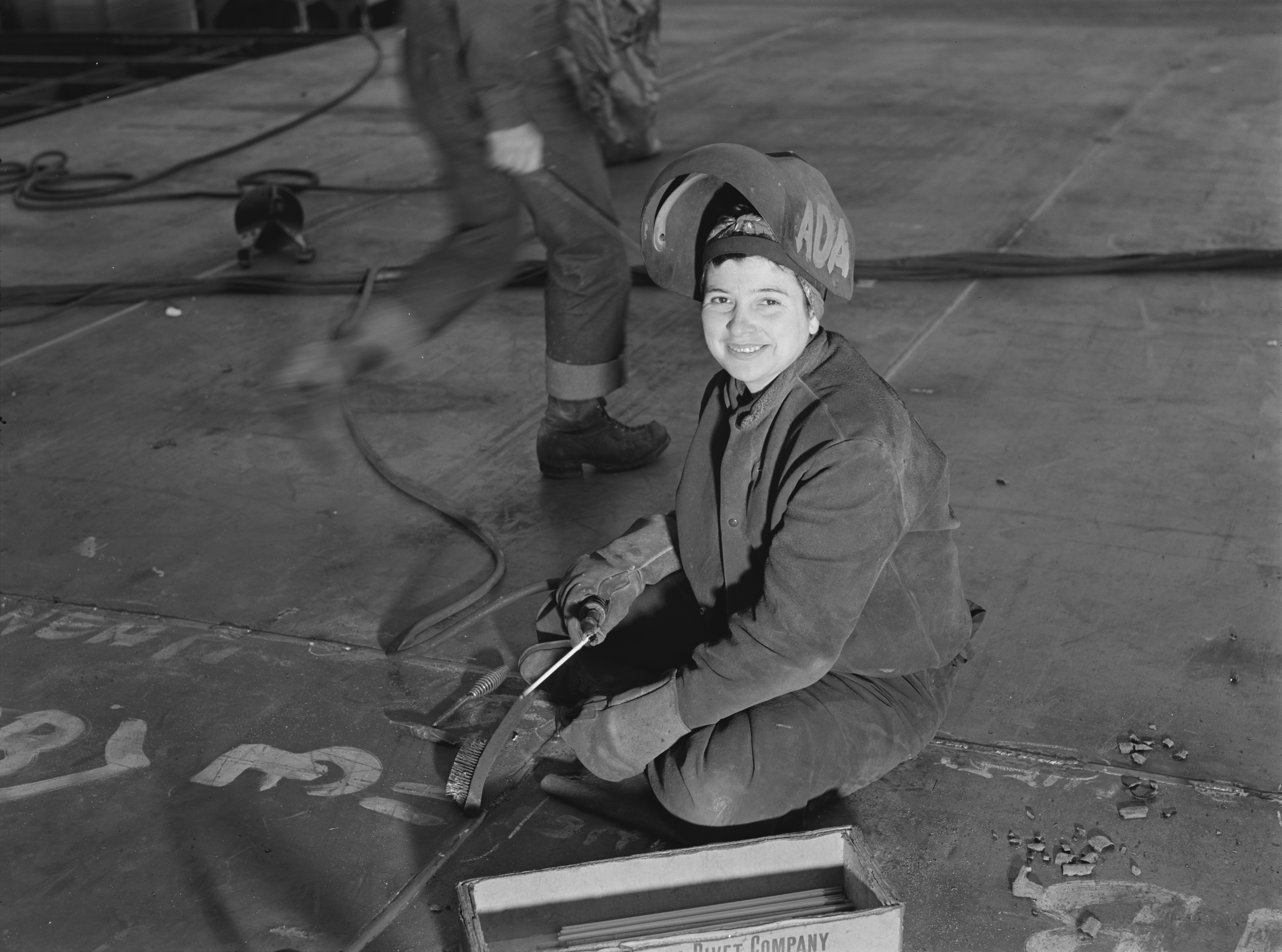
A "Wendy the Welder" at the Kaiser Richmond Shipyards, contributing to the war effort

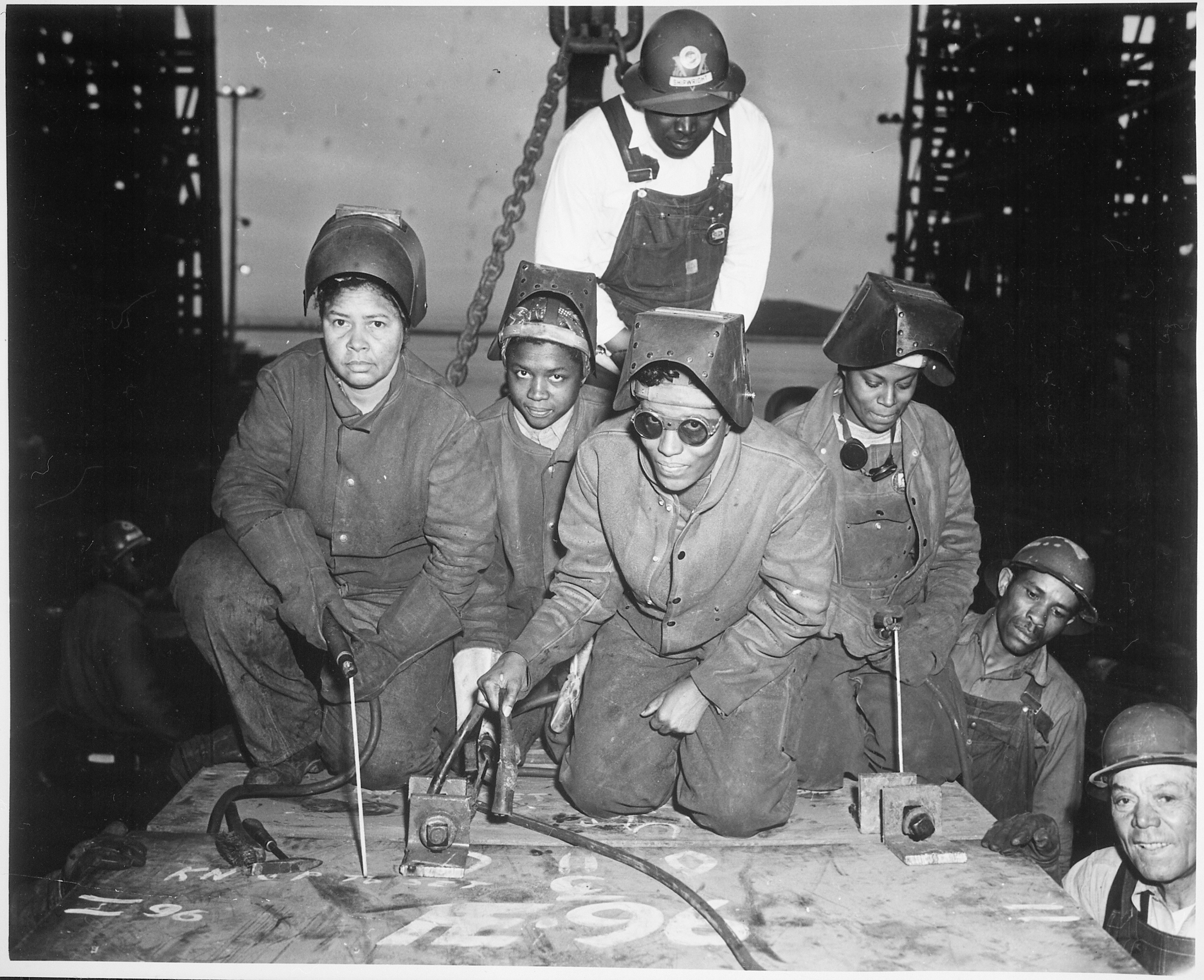
Richmond Shipyards welders prepare for a performance demonstration test

=== Post-war decline and rebound ===
When the war ended the shipyard workers were no longer needed, and a decades-long population decline ensued. The census listed 99,545 residents in 1950. By 1960 much of the temporary housing built for the shipyard workers was torn down, and the population dropped to about 71,800.

Just before his April 1968 assassination, Martin Luther King Jr. had been working on plans for the Poor People's Campaign, including a multi-city tour of the U.S. with a stop in Richmond. His son, Martin Luther King III, completed the Poverty in America Tour in 2007, stopping in Richmond. Unrest in late June 1968, sparked by the police shooting of a 15-year-old boy, damaged businesses in downtown along Macdonald Avenue. Most notably, the Travalini Furniture Store was destroyed by fire, which was assumed to be the result of the violent protests, but according to Fraser Felter, who was a reporter for the Richmond Independent, police sources told him the fire was set to avoid a debt instead by destroying store records.

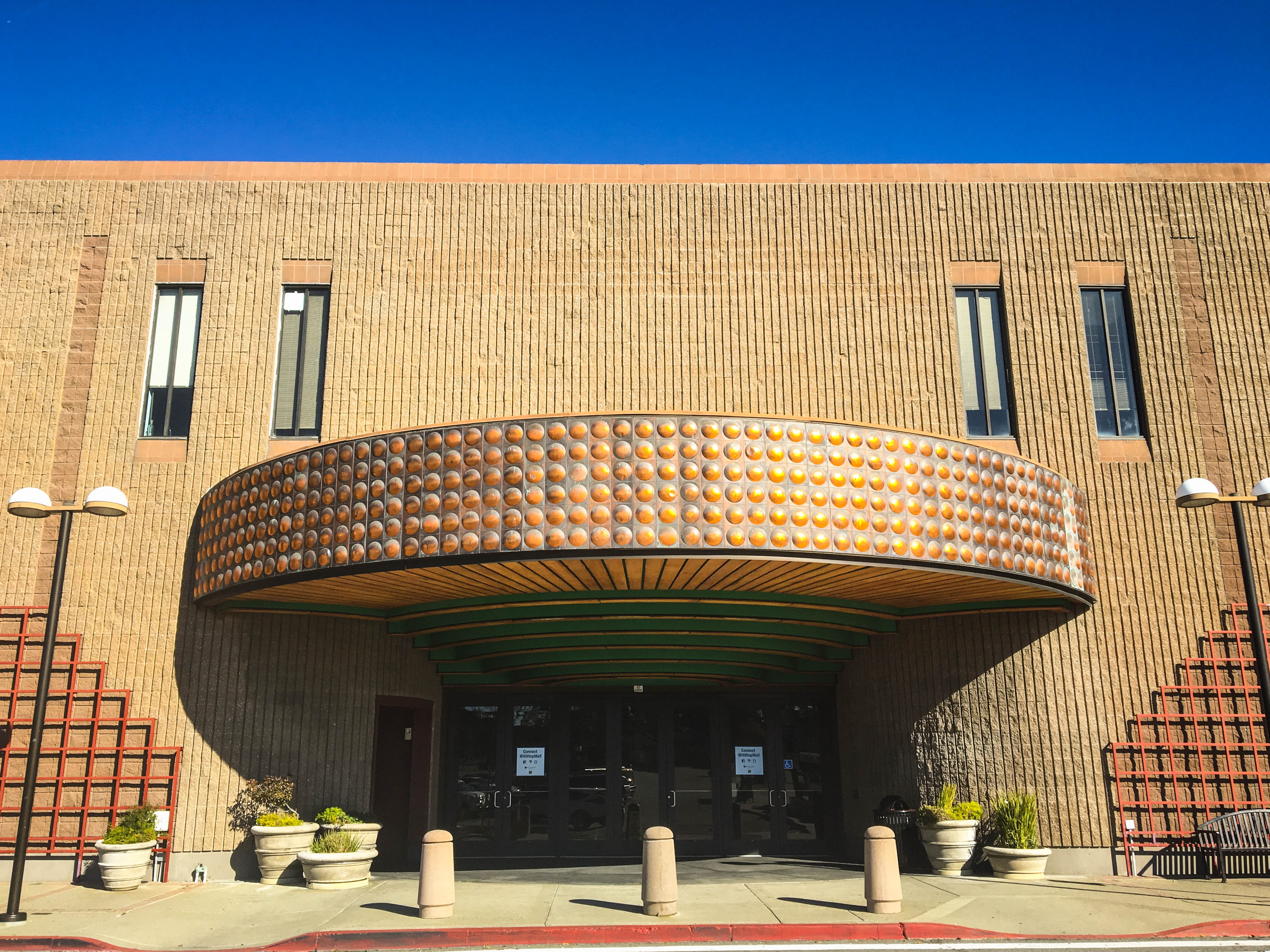
Entrance to Hilltop Mall

In the 1970s, the Hilltop area was developed in Richmond's northern suburbs, further depressing the downtown area as it drew retail clients and tenants away to the large indoor Hilltop Mall, which opened in 1976. The shopping mall, last named Hilltop Horizon, was opened under Taubman Centers, and has been sold since then to GM Pension Trust (1998), Simon Property Group (2007), Jones Lang LaSalle (2012), LBG Real Estate (2017), and Prologis (2021), who announced plans to close and demolish the building, reusing the land for a mixed-use development including residential, retail, and logistics facilities.

In the late 1990s the Richmond Parkway was built along Richmond's western industrial and northwestern parkland, connecting Interstates 80 and 580. Construction of the Parkway, which follows the alignment of SR 93 as proposed in 1958, started in 1990 and completed in 1996 at a cost of $193 million. However, Caltrans issued a letter in 1998 saying it would not take over responsibility for the road unless it was brought up to expressway standards; as it was cost-prohibitive to convert it, the road remains the responsibility of the city and county.

In 2006, the city celebrated its centennial. This coincided with the repaving and streetscaping project of Macdonald Avenue. The city's old rundown commercial district along Macdonald has been designated the city's "Main Street District" by the state of California. This has led to funding of improvements in the form of state grants.

== Geography ==
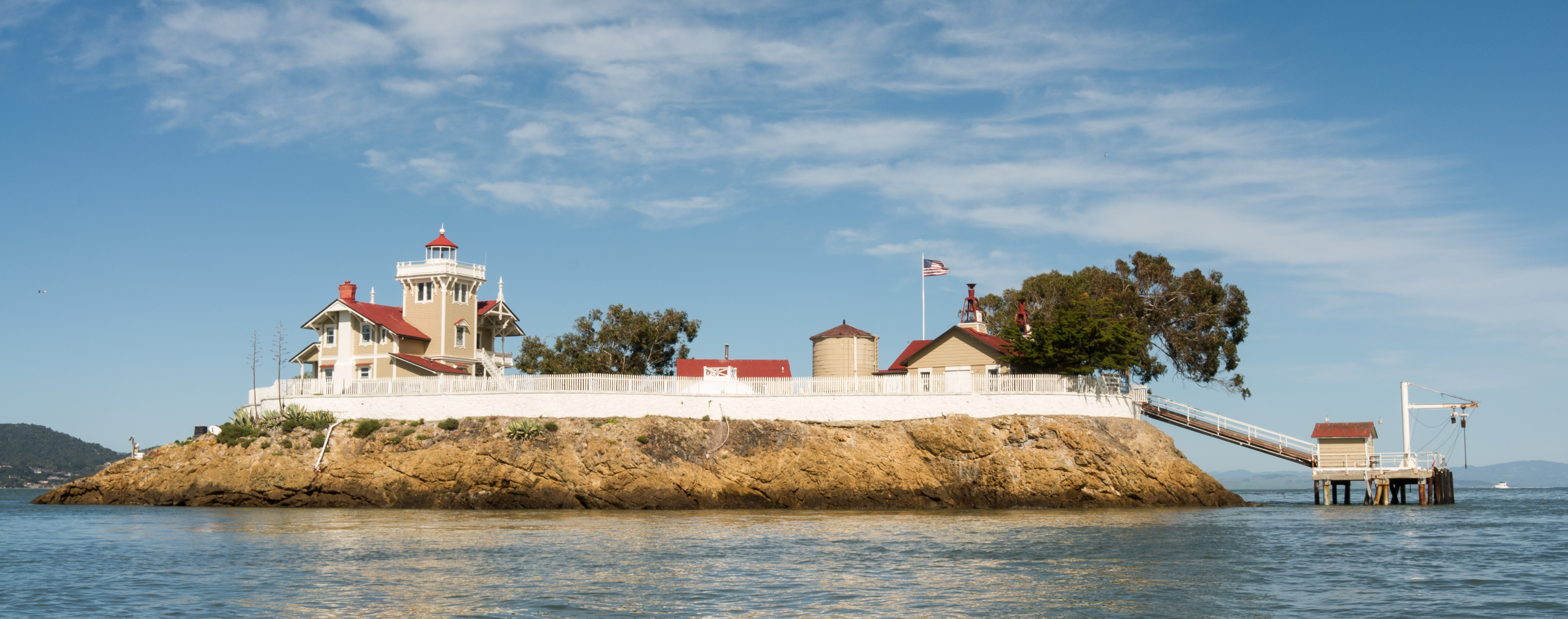
East Brother Island Lighthouse, located in a small island group in San Francisco Bay called The Brothers

Richmond is located at 37°56′09″N 122°20′52″W. According to the United States Census Bureau, the city has a total area of 52.5 square miles (136 km^{2}), of which 30.1 square miles (78 km^{2}) is land and 22.4 square miles (58 km^{2}) (comprising 42.71%) is water. The city sits on 32 miles (51 km) of waterfront, more than any other city in the Bay Area. The city borders San Francisco Bay to the southwest and San Pablo Bay to the northwest, and includes Brooks Island and the Brother Islands entirely, and half of Red Rock Island.

There are several cities and unincorporated communities surrounding or bordering Richmond. To the south is the city of Albany which is in Alameda County and the city of El Cerrito. The unincorporated communities of East Richmond Heights, Rollingwood, Hasford Heights, and El Sobrante lie to the east. North Richmond to the west and San Pablo to the east are almost entirely surrounded by Richmond's city limits. To the north, Richmond borders the city of Pinole and the unincorporated areas of Bayview, Montalvin Manor, Hilltop Green, Tara Hills. Richmond borders Alameda, San Francisco, and Marin counties in the Bay and Red Rock Island.

The city is within the 94801, 94803, 94804, 94805, and 94806 ZIP Codes.

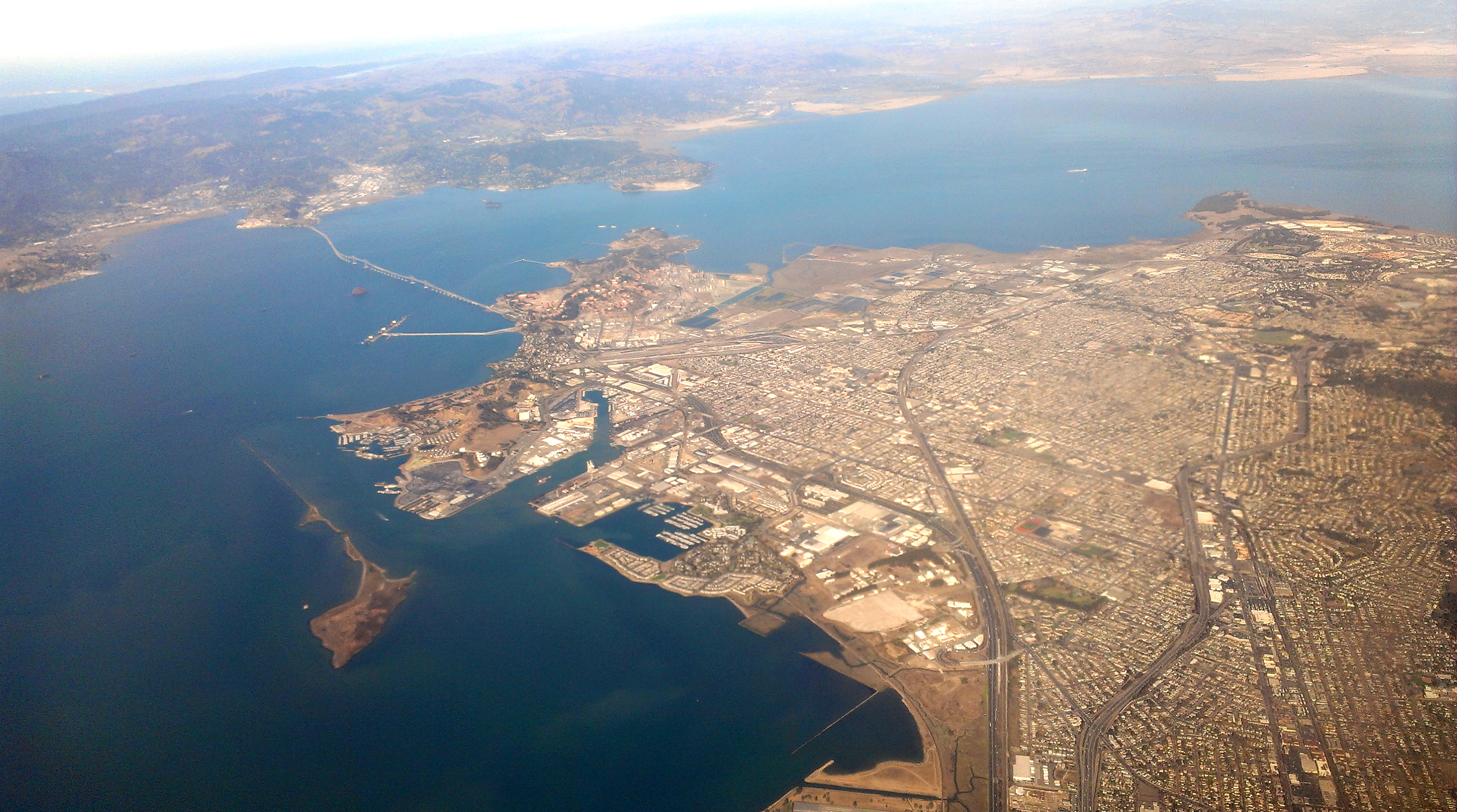
Aerial view in 2015

=== Climate ===
Richmond, like the rest of the East Bay, has a Mediterranean climate. The climate is slightly warmer than the coastal areas of San Francisco, the Peninsula, and Marin County; it is however more temperate than areas further inland. The average highs range from 57 to 73 °F (14 to 23 °C) and the lows range from 43 to 56 °F (6 to 13 °C) year round. Richmond usually enjoys an "Indian summer", and September is, on average, the warmest month. January is on average the coldest month.

The highest recorded temperature in Richmond was 107 °F (42 °C) in September 1971 while the coldest was 24 °F (−4 °C) in December 1990.

The rainy season begins in late October and ends in April, with some showers in May. Most of the rain occurs during stronger storms which occur between November and March and drop 3.3–4.91 inches (84–125 mm) of rain per month. January and February are the rainiest months.

Like most of the Bay Area, Richmond is made up of several microclimates. Southern parts of the city and the ridges receive more fog than northern areas. Summer temperatures are higher in inland areas, where the moderating influence of San Francisco Bay is lessened. The average wind speed is 6–9 miles per hour (10–14 km/h) with stronger winds from March through August; the strongest winds are in June. The city also enjoys more than 80% sunshine seven months out of the year and ten months with 60% or more. December and January are the darkest months with about 45% average brightness. The city experiences virtually no snowfall, and brief hail annually.

Climate data for Richmond, California (1991–2020 normals, extremes 1950–present)
Month	Jan	Feb	Mar	Apr	May	Jun	Jul	Aug	Sep	Oct	Nov	Dec	Year
Record high °F (°C)	78 (26)	81 (27)	87 (31)	94 (34)	100 (38)	106 (41)	98 (37)	103 (39)	107 (42)	100 (38)	89 (32)	76 (24)	107 (42)
Mean daily maximum °F (°C)	58.2 (14.6)	61.3 (16.3)	64.1 (17.8)	67.2 (19.6)	69.0 (20.6)	70.1 (21.2)	70.8 (21.6)	72.2 (22.3)	74.7 (23.7)	72.8 (22.7)	64.8 (18.2)	58.2 (14.6)	67.1 (19.5)
Daily mean °F (°C)	51.1 (10.6)	53.6 (12.0)	55.8 (13.2)	58.2 (14.6)	60.5 (15.8)	63.0 (17.2)	63.0 (17.2)	64.0 (17.8)	65.4 (18.6)	63.3 (17.4)	56.7 (13.7)	51.3 (10.7)	58.8 (14.9)
Mean daily minimum °F (°C)	44.1 (6.7)	45.9 (7.7)	47.4 (8.6)	49.3 (9.6)	52.0 (11.1)	54.1 (12.3)	55.2 (12.9)	55.9 (13.3)	56.2 (13.4)	53.7 (12.1)	48.7 (9.3)	44.4 (6.9)	50.6 (10.3)
Record low °F (°C)	27 (−3)	28 (−2)	33 (1)	35 (2)	38 (3)	43 (6)	44 (7)	44 (7)	43 (6)	41 (5)	34 (1)	24 (−4)	24 (−4)
Average precipitation inches (mm)	4.83 (123)	4.76 (121)	3.17 (81)	1.57 (40)	0.72 (18)	0.27 (6.9)	0.00 (0.00)	0.07 (1.8)	0.03 (0.76)	1.42 (36)	2.67 (68)	4.90 (124)	24.41 (620)
Average precipitation days (≥ 0.01 in)	10.0	9.2	9.3	5.5	3.3	1.2	0.0	0.1	0.4	2.7	6.3	9.8	57.8
Source: NOAA

== Environment ==
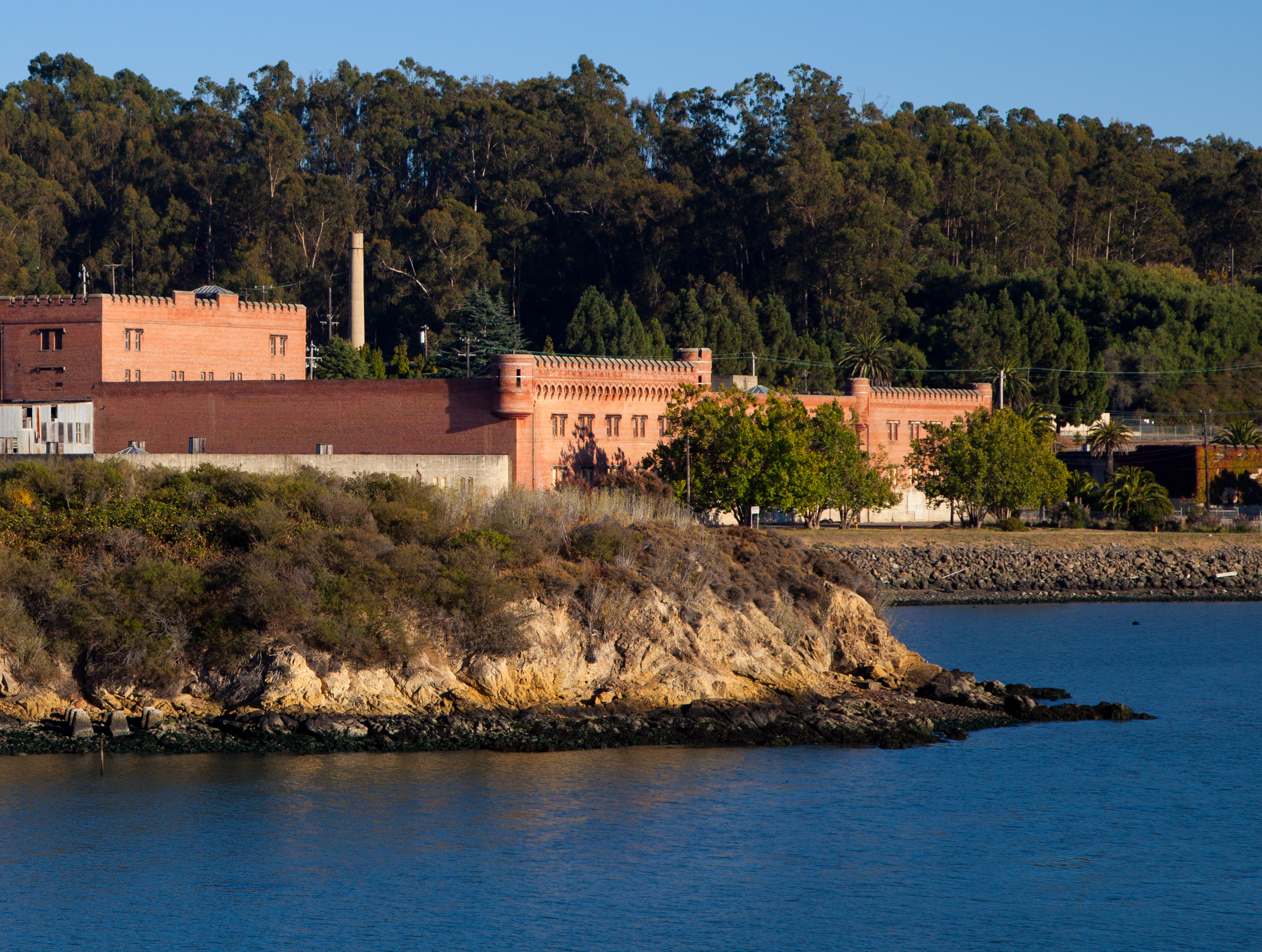
View of Winehaven

Richmond is home to many species of animals. Canada geese visit the city on their annual migrations. Harbor seals live on the Castro Rocks, and pigeons and gulls populate the sidewalks and parking lots. Tadpoles and frogs can be found in the local creeks and vernal pools. Field mice and lizards are also found. Herons and egrets nest in protected areas on Brooks Island. Deer, falcons, raccoons, ducks, foxes, owls, and mountain lions live in Wildcat Canyon and Point Pinole Regional Shoreline.

A license is needed for fishing on the waterfront or city waters but not on the piers, where in addition to crabs, sturgeon are plentiful. Striped bass, bat rays, leopard sharks, surf perch, jacksmelt, white croaker, and flounders are also found. Richmond is one of the few places where you can find the rare Olympia oyster on the West Coast, in the waters along the refinery's shoreline. Rainbow trout have recently returned to San Pablo and Wildcat creeks.

Red-tailed hawks patrol the skies. Monarch butterflies migrate through the city on their journey between Mexico and Canada. Wildcat Marsh has two ponds where Canada geese often rest, and is also the home of the endangered salt marsh harvest mouse and California clapper rail. Another endangered species in the city is the Santa Cruz tarweed which survives alongside Interstate 80. Wildcat Canyon also hosts falcons and vultures. Threatened black rails also live in the city's marshes.

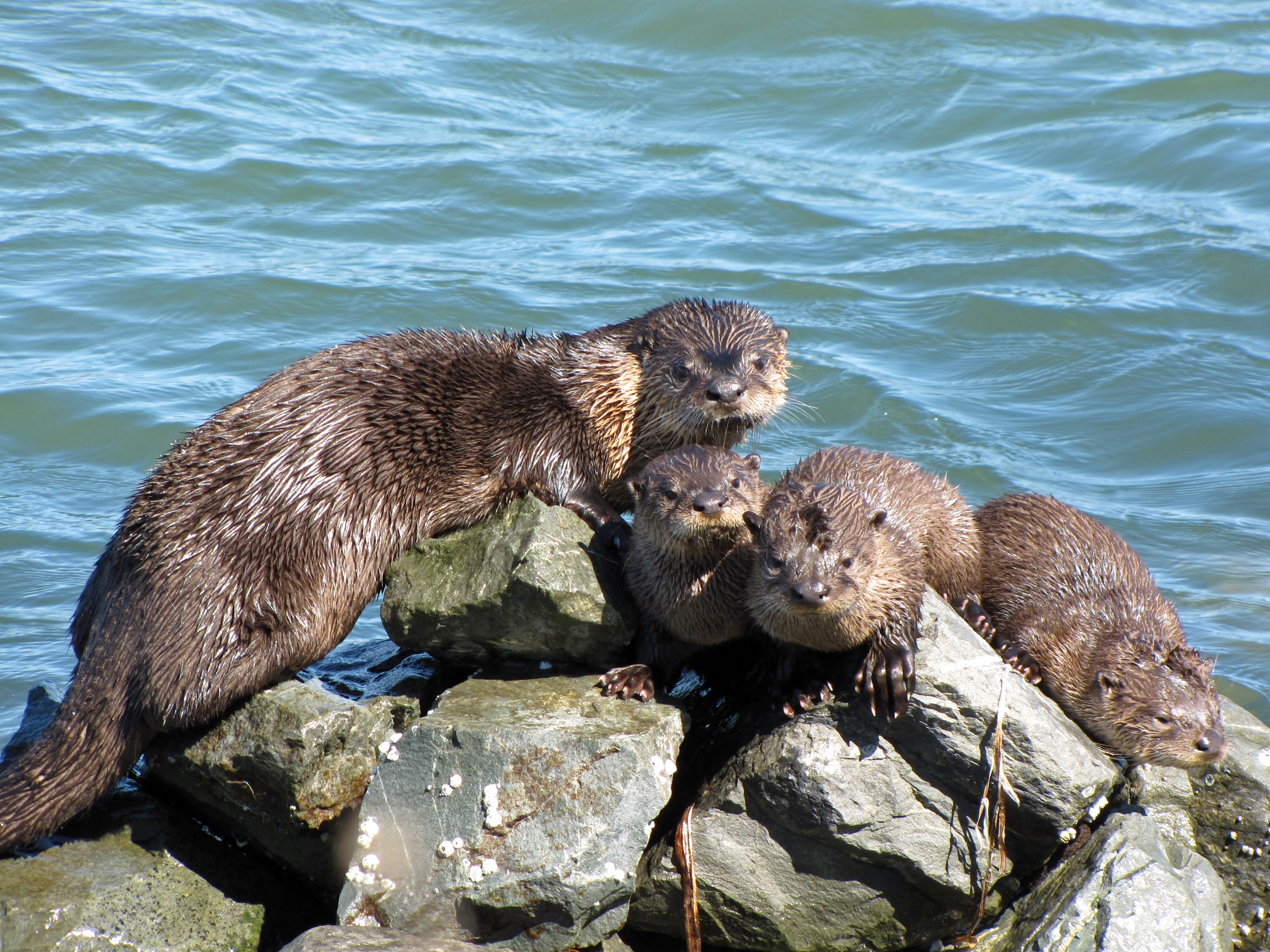
Otters at the Richmond Marina

After a baby gray whale was beached on the Point Richmond shore in May 2007, its rotting corpse became bothersome to neighbors. Removal was delayed as various agencies argued over which would have to pay for it, at an eventual cost of $18,000.

Richmond is also home to one of the last pristine moist grassland habitats in the entire Bay Area at the former Campus Bay UC Berkeley Field Station near Meeker Slough. Richmond residents, however, have limited access to other environmental benefits. Because of the refineries located in Richmond, air quality is particularly low, and residents are especially at risk of air-pollution-related health issues.

In 2006, the city was sued by an environmental group for dumping raw sewage into the Bay. Councilmember Tom Butt was very vocal on the subject, accusing the city council of turning a blind eye to the problem.

A 60-acre, 10.5-megawatt solar farm was opened within the city in 2018. The farm sits on a former landfill owned by Chevron.

== Crime ==
The city has in the past suffered from a high crime rate; at one point, the city council requested a declaration of a state of emergency and asked for the intervention of the Contra Costa County Sheriff and the California Highway Patrol. Murder, vehicle theft, and larceny rates remain high, although they tend to be concentrated in the Iron Triangle and adjacent unincorporated North Richmond, which is outside the jurisdiction of the Richmond Police Department. By 1991, the city's all-time high of 62 homicides, among a population of 98,000, was seven times the national average. The portion of these homicides that were drug- or gang-related increased from 5 percent to 55 percent between 1989 and 1991.

Despite the city making extreme headway in crime reduction and prevention, Richmond received widespread attention in 2009 when a girl was gang raped at a homecoming dance at Richmond High School.

In 2007, Richmond opened a program to prevent gun violence, the Office of Neighborhood Safety. The program collects information and analyzes public records to determine "the 50 people in Richmond most likely to shoot someone and to be shot themselves." It then offers selected individuals "a spot in a program that includes a stipend to turn their lives around". "Over an 18-month period, if the men demonstrate better behavior, ONS offers them up to $1,000 a month in cash, plus opportunities to travel beyond Richmond."

In 2004, Richmond was ranked the 12th most dangerous city in America. Those rankings have changed, and Richmond is no longer ranked as a "most dangerous" city, in either California or the United States. This is in large part due to the efforts of Police Chief Chris Magnus, who established "community policing", which involves police officers engaging with affected high crime communities.

== Disasters ==
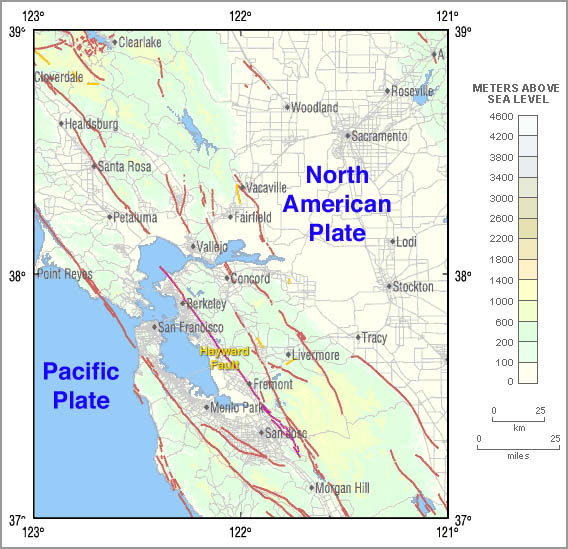
Map showing the Hayward fault running through the eastern Richmond hills and the hilltop area through to San Pablo Bay

Richmond lies in the volatile California region that has a potential for devastating earthquakes. Many buildings were damaged in the 1989 Loma Prieta earthquake. The city has also had at least one minor tornado. The Chevron Richmond Refinery had highly noted chemical leaks in the 1990s. The company has been fined thousands, and sometimes hundreds of thousands, of dollars.

Richmond has a siren system consisting of 17 emergency warning sirens located across the city; they are tested on the first Wednesday of every month, at 11 am PST (12 pm PDT), and are usually used to warn of toxic chemical releases from the Chevron Richmond Refinery.

In a July 26, 1993, industrial accident, a General Chemical company rail tanker car containing oleum overheated and exploded in the General Chemical railyard. This resulted in a 17-mile (27 km) area contaminated with the poisonous gas, and led to 25,000 people landing in the hospital. The incident led to lawsuits, and has been referred to as a mini-Bhopal.

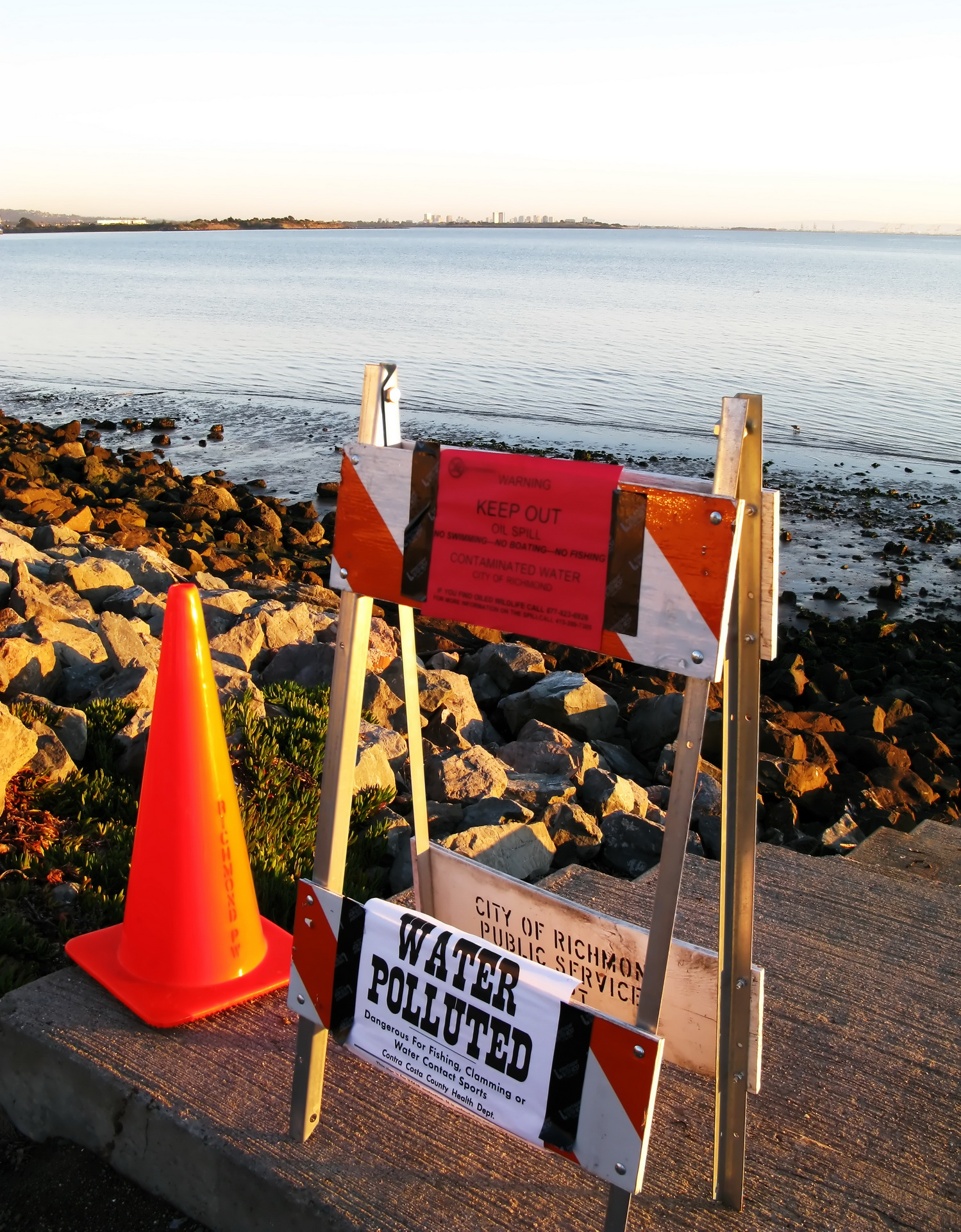
A beach closed due to oil contamination along the shoreline at Marina Bay

=== 2007 San Francisco Bay oil spill ===
The city's shoreline and wildlife were seriously affected by the 2007 San Francisco Bay oil spill. Beaches and shoreline were closed, but later reopened. Keller Beach was closed to public access for swimmers.

=== 2010 sinkhole ===
On April 15, 2010, a sinkhole roughly 30 feet (9.1 m) deep appeared at the intersection of El Portal Drive and Via Verdi. Although no one was hurt, a car fell into the sinkhole.

=== 2012 Chevron refinery fire ===
On August 6, 2012, at around 6:15 PM, a large fire erupted at the Chevron refinery, sending plumes of toxic smoke into the surrounding area and resulting in nearly 15,000 people to seek medical treatment following the incident. Just minutes after the fire was reported, Contra Costa Health Services notified residents “shelter in place”; the local siren system was activated and several messages were issued through the Emergency Alert System. The fire was reported contained at around 10:40 PM.

== Demographics ==
Historical population
Census	Pop.	Note	%±
1910	6,802		—
1920	16,843		147.6%
1930	20,093		19.3%
1940	23,642		17.7%
1950	99,545		321.1%
1960	71,854		−27.8%
1970	79,043		10.0%
1980	74,676		−5.5%
1990	87,425		17.1%
2000	99,216		13.5%
2010	103,701		4.5%
2020	116,448		12.3%
U.S. Decennial Census; 2010 2020

=== Racial and ethnic composition ===
Richmond city, California – Racial and ethnic composition Note: the US Census treats Hispanic/Latino as an ethnic category. This table excludes Latinos from the racial categories and assigns them to a separate category. Hispanics/Latinos may be of any race.
Race / Ethnicity (NH = Non-Hispanic)	Pop 2000	Pop 2010	Pop 2020	% 2000	% 2010	% 2020
White alone (NH)	21,081	17,769	18,985	21.25%	17.13%	16.30%
Black or African American alone (NH)	35,279	26,872	21,753	35.56%	25.91%	18.68%
Native American or Alaska Native alone (NH)	351	250	266	0.35%	0.24%	0.23%
Asian alone (NH)	12,077	13,783	16,460	12.17%	13.29%	14.14%
Native Hawaiian or Pacific Islander alone (NH)	476	462	609	0.48%	0.45%	0.52%
Other race alone (NH)	400	585	1,243	0.40%	0.56%	1.07%
Mixed race or Multiracial (NH)	3,233	3,059	5,220	3.26%	2.95%	4.48%
Hispanic or Latino (any race)	26,319	40,921	51,912	26.53%	39.46%	44.58%
Total	99,216	103,701	116,448	100.00%	100.00%	100.00%

=== 2020 ===
The 2020 United States census reported that Richmond had a population of 116,448. The population density was 3,874.6 inhabitants per square mile (1,496.0/km^{2}). The racial makeup of Richmond was 20.1% White, 19.1% African American, 2.1% Native American, 14.4% Asian, 0.6% Pacific Islander, 30.7% from other races, and 13.1% from two or more races. Hispanic or Latino of any race were 44.6% of the population.

The census reported that 98.1% of the population lived in households, 1.3% lived in non-institutionalized group quarters, and 0.6% were institutionalized.

There were 38,677 households, out of which 35.3% included children under the age of 18, 41.7% were married-couple households, 7.9% were cohabiting couple households, 31.7% had a female householder with no partner present, and 18.7% had a male householder with no partner present. 24.1% of households were one person, and 9.8% were one person aged 65 or older. The average household size was 2.95. There were 26,498 families (68.5% of all households).

The age distribution was 22.2% under the age of 18, 8.9% aged 18 to 24, 30.8% aged 25 to 44, 24.5% aged 45 to 64, and 13.6% who were 65 years of age or older. The median age was 36.9 years. For every 100 females, there were 96.3 males.

There were 40,375 housing units at an average density of 1,343.4 units per square mile (518.7 units/km^{2}), of which 38,677 (95.8%) were occupied. Of these, 51.2% were owner-occupied, and 48.8% were occupied by renters.

In 2023, the US Census Bureau estimated that the median household income was $90,038, and the per capita income was $41,898. About 9.5% of families and 13.6% of the population were below the poverty line.

=== 2010 ===
The 2010 United States census reported that Richmond had a population of 103,701. The population density was 1,976.0 inhabitants per square mile (762.9/km^{2}). The racial makeup of Richmond was 32,590 (31.4%) White, 27,542 (26.6%) African American, 662 (0.6%) Native American, 13,984 (13.5%) Asian (4.0% Chinese, 3.5% Filipino, 1.6% Laotian, 1.2% Indian, 0.7% Vietnamese, 0.6% Japanese, 0.4% Korean, 0.2% Pakistani, 0.1% Thai), 537 (0.5%) Pacific Islander, 22,573 (21.8%) from other races, and 5,813 (5.6%) from two or more races. Hispanic or Latino of any race were 40,921 persons (39.5%). Among the Hispanic population, 27.3% were of Mexican origin, 4.7% Salvadoran, 1.7% Guatemalan, and 1.2% Nicaraguan heritage.

The census reported that 102,118 people (98.5% of the population) lived in households, 670 (0.6%) lived in non-institutionalized group quarters, and 913 (0.9%) were institutionalized.

There were 36,093 households, out of which 13,487 (37.4%) had children under the age of 18 living in them, 14,502 (40.2%) were opposite-sex married couples living together, 6,931 (19.2%) had a female householder with no husband present, 2,585 (7.2%) had a male householder with no wife present. There were 2,538 (7.0%) unmarried opposite-sex partnerships, and 427 (1.2%) same-sex married couples or partnerships. 9,546 households (26.4%) were made up of individuals, and 2,707 (7.5%) had someone living alone who was 65 years of age or older. The average household size was 2.83. There were 24,018 families (66.5% of all households); the average family size was 3.43.

The age distribution of the population shows 25,800 people (24.9%) under the age of 18, 10,364 people (10.0%) aged 18 to 24, 30,846 people (29.7%) aged 25 to 44, 26,109 people (25.2%) aged 45 to 64, and 10,582 people (10.2%) who were 65 years of age or older. The median age was 34.8 years. For every 100 females, there were 94.8 males. For every 100 females age 18 and over, there were 92.0 males.

There were 39,328 housing units at an average density of 749.4 units per square mile (289.3 units/km^{2}), of which 36,093 were occupied, of which 18,659 (51.7%) were owner-occupied, and 17,434 (48.3%) were occupied by renters. The homeowner vacancy rate was 2.5%; the rental vacancy rate was 8.1%. 52,683 people (50.8% of the population) lived in owner-occupied housing units and 49,435 people (47.7%) lived in rented housing.

The population of Richmond was 22% African-American as of 2015, while it was 44% African-American in 1990.

=== 2000 ===
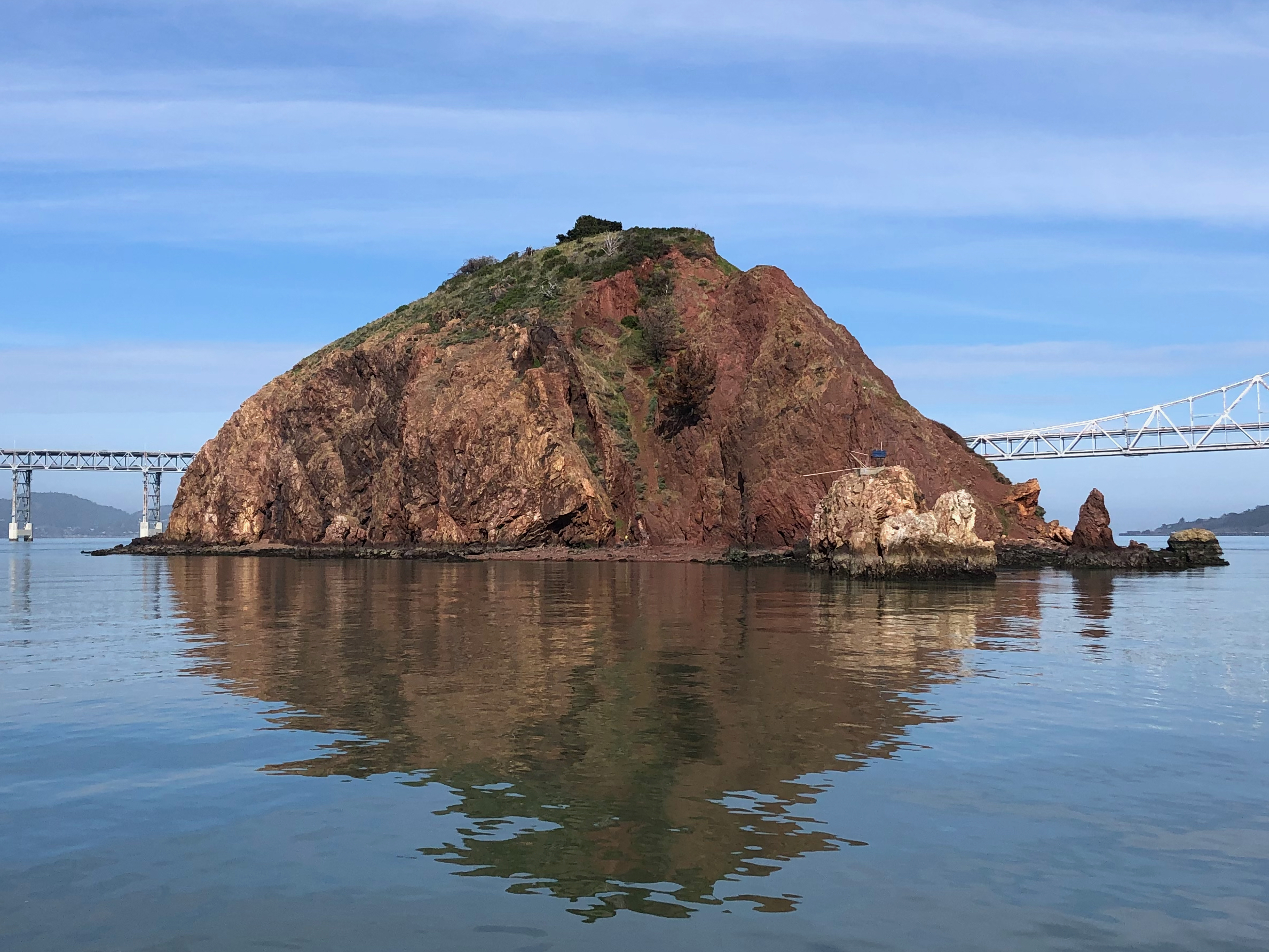
Red Rock Island

As of the census of 2000, there were 99,216 people, 34,625 households, and 23,025 families in the city. The population density was 3,309.5 inhabitants per square mile (1,277.8/km^{2}). There were 36,044 housing units at an average density of 1,202.3 units per square mile (464.2 units/km^{2}). The racial makeup of the city was 36.06% black or African American, 21.36% white, 0.64% Native American, 12.29% Asian, 0.50% Pacific Islander, 13.86% from other races, and 5.27% from two or more races. 26.53% of the population were Hispanic or Latino, of any race.

Of the 34,625 households, 33.7% had children under the age of 18 living with them, 40.5% were married couples living together, 20.1% had a female householder with no husband present, and 33.5% were non-families. 26.2% of all households were made up of individuals, and 7.4% had someone living alone who was 65 years of age or older. The average household size was 2.82 and the average family size was 3.44.

In the city, the age distribution of the population shows 27.7% under the age of 18, 9.9% from 18 to 24, 31.4% from 25 to 44, 21.2% from 45 to 64, and 9.9% who were 65 years of age or older. The median age was 33 years. For every 100 females, there were 94.6 males. For every 100 females age 18 and over, there were 91.2 males.

The median income for a household in the city was $44,210, and the median income for a family was $46,659. Males had a median income of $37,389 versus $34,204 for females. The per capita income for the city was $19,788. About 13.4% of families and 16.2% of the population were below the poverty line, including 23.1% of those under age 18 and 11.8% of those age 65 or over.

75.4% of inhabitants over the age of 25 were high school graduates, while 22.4% had bachelor's degrees, and 8.3% had a graduate or professional degree. 7.7% of the population was unemployed and those who were employed took, on average, 34.3 minutes to commute to their place of work.

33.2% of the population aged 15 and over has never married, while 46.3% is currently wed. 11.1% have already divorced, 3.1% is currently separated, and 6.4% has been widowed.

20.6% of the population was born outside the U.S., of which 15.4% were born in Latin America and 8.7% in Asia.

During the day the population shrinks by 6.2% due to commuting while 23.3% of the population works within the city limits. 20.5% of the jobs in the city are in the educational, health, and social service fields, while 10.9% are professional, scientific, management, administrative, and waste disposal, and 10.4% are in retail.

7.0% of Richmonders are veterans of the U.S. Armed Forces compared with 10.9% nationally. 33.2% are foreign born while 12.4% are nationwide. 48.1% of men and 43.2% of women are married; 55.9 and 51% of Americans are respectively. Nearly half (46.7%) speak a language other than the English language at home. 65.3% are employed, even with the national average. The average household income is US$52,794; $6,552 higher than the national average. The average family makes 57,931 dollars while the average American household makes 55,832 dollars. The per capita income is 22,326 compared with 25,035 federally.

Among Richmond residents, 64.56% residents speak English, 23.13% speak Spanish, 2.11% speak Tagalog, 1.75% speak Chinese, 1.20% speak Miao–Mien, 1.12% speak Laotian, 0.72% speak Punjabi, 0.54% speak Cantonese, 0.51% speak French, 0.5% speak Vietnamese, 3.49% speak other languages, none of which represents more than half of one percent of the population.

== Economy ==
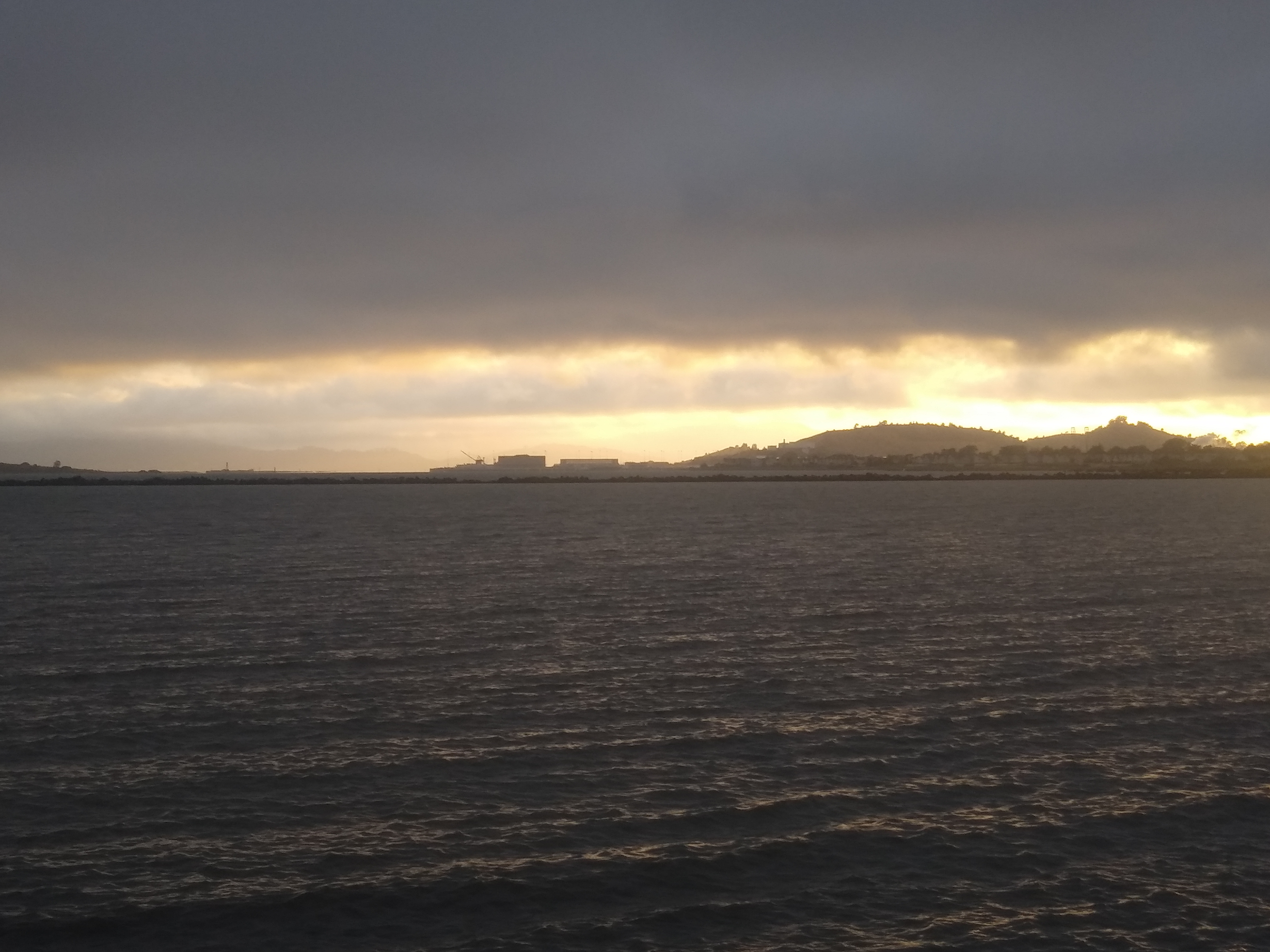
The Port of Richmond (seen in the distance) has been a major part of the economy of the city.

Largest employers in Richmond; 2024
Rank	Name	Industry
1.	Chevron Corporation	Petrochemical
2.	Kaiser Foundation Hospitals	Healthcare
3.	United Parcel Service	Shipping
4.	Social Security Administration	Government
5.	West Contra Costa Unified School District	Education
6.	Amazon.com services	E-Commerce
7.	Permanente Medical Group	Healthcare
8.	United States Postal Service (including San Francisco NDC)	Government
9.	Home Express Delivery Service, LLC	Shipping
10.	Contra Costa County	Government

Many industries have been and are still sited in Richmond. It had a dynamite and gunpowder works (the Giant Powder Company, closed in 1960, now the site of Point Pinole Regional Shoreline), the last active whaling station in the country at Point Molate (closed in 1971), and one of the world's largest wineries (Winehaven), closed by Prohibition in 1919.

During World War II, Richmond developed rapidly as a heavy industrial town, chiefly devoted to shipbuilding. Its major activity now is as a seaport, with 26 million tons of goods shipped through Port Richmond in 1993, mostly oil and petroleum products. The seaport is also home to a major oil refinery operated by Chevron Corporation. The Social Security Administration employs over 1,000 at its regional office and program service center in Downtown Richmond. Kaiser Permanente's Richmond Medical Center hospital in the Downtown Richmond is one of the largest employers in the city.

=== Retail ===
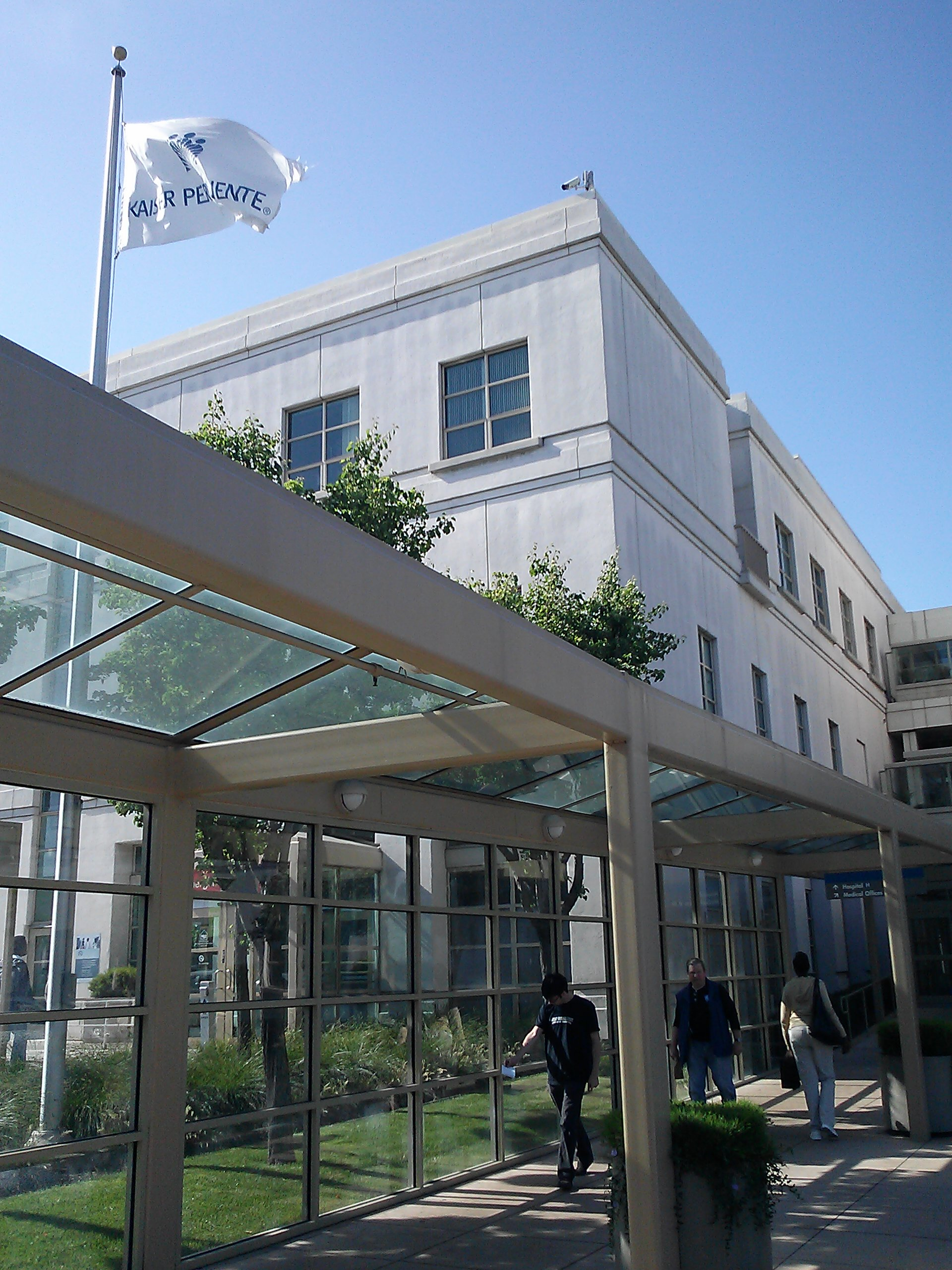
Kaiser Permanente Richmond Medical Center in downtown Richmond

The Hilltop District includes Prologis Hilltop Center and a 16-screen Century Theatres alongside Hilltop Plaza Shopping Center. The 23rd Street business district has evolved into a predominantly Latino neighborhood over the last twenty years as have the storefronts.

In the Downtown Richmond District the Richmond Shopping Center was built as part of the city's "main street" revitalization efforts.

The Macdonald 80 Shopping Center is a commercial plot along the trunk route of Macdonald Avenue which has been designated the city's main street under the aforementioned program. It was once anchored by the now-defunct Montgomery Wards and a Toys"R"Us. Demolition of the former buildings and construction of a new shopping mall were completed in 2006.

=== Redevelopment ===
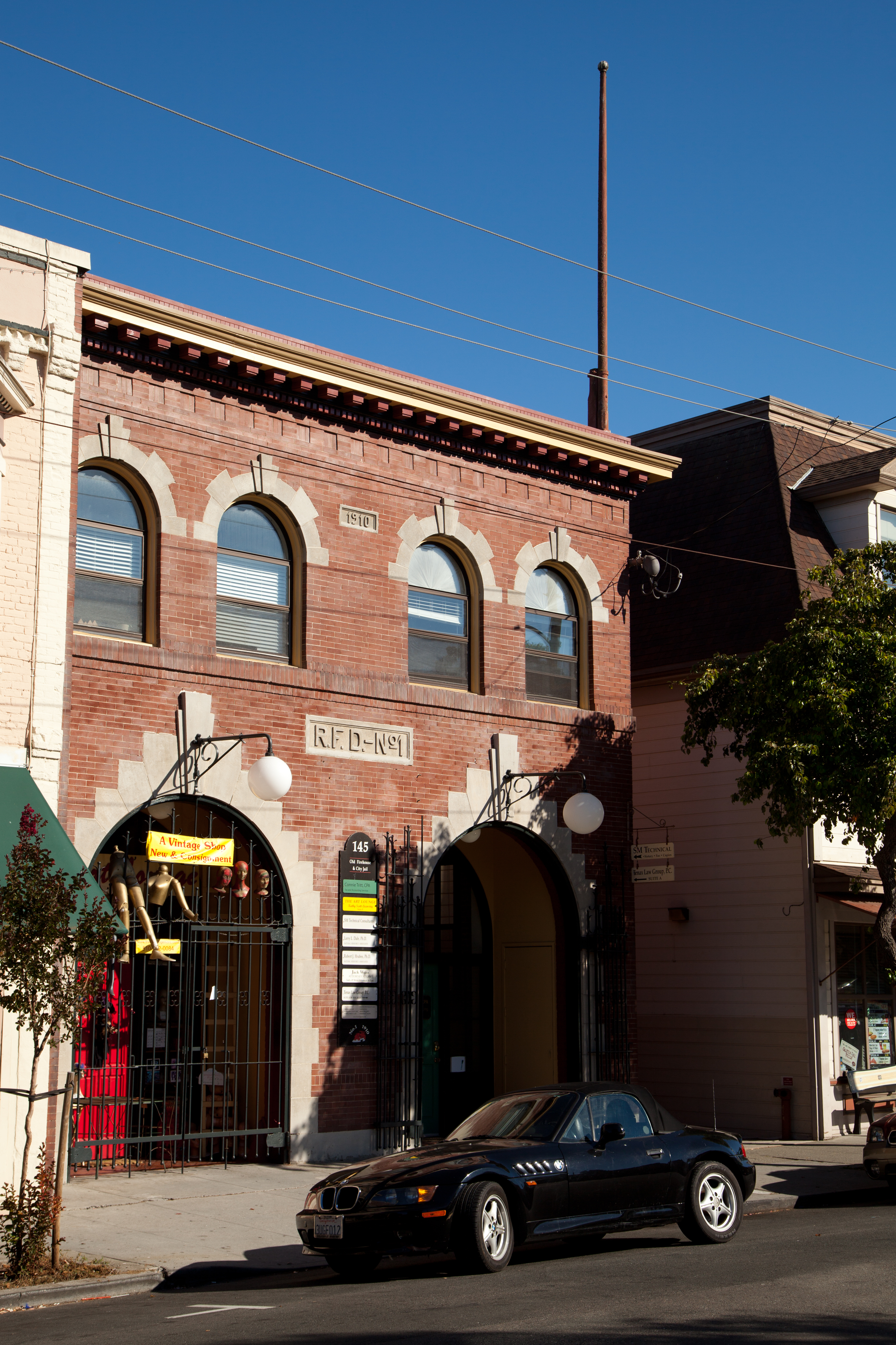
Pt. Richmond Historic District

The former Richmond Shipyard No. 2 and Inner Harbor were transformed starting in the late 1980s into a multiunit residential area, now known as Marina Bay. Starting in the early 2000s, the city began an aggressive redevelopment effort spurring exurban tract housing, condominiums, townhomes, a transit village, and terraced hillside subdivisions. The city also created a redevelopment agency that refurbished Macdonald Avenue, funded the Metro Walk transit village, resurrected the Macdonald 80 Shopping Center, and created the Richmond Greenway rails-to-trails trail and urban farming project. Since 1996, new homes have increased in price by 32%, and there has been a 65.6% increase in the total amount of new dwellings built annually.

Country Club Vista is a development surrounding the Richmond Country Club to the south and north. It includes suburban style tract houses with cul-de-sac courts and small yards. Seacliff, at Point Richmond, is a development of luxury waterfront homes built on a terraced hillside. San Marcos is a series of about ten condominium multistory buildings between The Shops at Hilltop and Country Club Vista. Richmond Transit Village has been constructed in the former west parking lot and an adjacent empty lot of the combined Richmond BART and Amtrak station. The development is part of the city's downtown revitalization efforts.

=== Richmond CARES ===
On September 11, 2013, the seven-member Richmond City Council, in a four-to-three vote, decided to pursue a scheme for using eminent domain to buy out mortgages. The vote was on "[setting] up a Joint Powers Authority to bring more cities into the plan". However, at least five votes would be needed before any mortgage could actually be bought out. North Las Vegas, Nevada and California governments including El Monte Fontana, the city of Ontario and San Bernardino County had considered such plans but decided not to pursue them. The vote made Richmond the first to accept the idea. The plan had been opposed by the vice-mayor and some members of the city council, who said it would "compromise" the city's finances.

Critics of the plan noted that the company Mortgage Resolution Partners stood to potentially profit: it would receive $4,500 from the new lenders for each refinanced mortgage for arranging the financing to purchase the original loans and for handling all legal, administrative, and refinancing operations (an amount matching what lenders are compensated for under the Federal HARP loan modification program). Critics also questioned the inclusion of wealthy neighborhoods such as "the area near the Richmond Country Club". The Western Contra Costa Association of Realtors hired a public relations agency and sent mass mailings warning against the scheme; its advertising was "funded, in part, by more than $70,000 from the California Association of Realtors and the National Associations of Realtors."

Deutsche Bank and Wells Fargo had sued, claiming the program was unconstitutional. "[T]he National Housing Law Project, Housing and Economic Rights Advocates, Bay Area Legal Aid, the Law Foundation of Silicon Valley, and the California Reinvestment Coalition" opposed the suit, calling the banks' request for an injunction against the city "discrimination in violation of the Fair Housing Act".

Supporters of the plan include the Alliance of Californians for Community Empowerment and Robert Hockett, a professor of law at Cornell University.

== Casinos ==
Many casinos have been proposed for the West Contra Costa area. Point Molate would have a casino, resort, and a luxury shopping mall. Sugar Bowl Casino proposed a casino, a steakhouse, and a buffet promoted by the Pomo Tribe's Scotts Valley Band near the border between North Richmond and the city of Richmond's Parchester Village, whose residents have lauded it as a boon to fighting crime by adding more of a police presence and creating jobs for shiftless youth, but residents from neighboring newly developed sub-divisions along the Richmond Country Club were fervently opposed based on potential losses to property values. Casino San Pablo has already been built in neighboring San Pablo, with 2,500 slots. The projects have been the subject of much civic debate; supporters contend that the often cash-strapped government would get a major new source of revenue, while opponents air their concerns over the ramifications, including an increase in already high crime rates, lowered property values, and worsening neighborhood quality of life.

Point Molate is currently slated to either become a housing and conference center, a casino resort shopping area, or a large regional park.

In 2010, the city approved the environmental review of the plan in which the tribe agreed to contain development of the casino to the footprint of the buildings on the former naval depot site. The lobbying and reports required by Richmond have cost the tribe $15 million. This approval won over the region's strict environmentalists and many council members. Later that year residents were given the opportunity to weigh in on the issue and voted on the non-binding measure U to determine their approval of the project. 58% of voters opposed the $1 billion project. Citing the people's opposition and the inability to negotiate several key points with the developer, the city council voted down the project in 2011. Councilman Nat Bates remained a proponent of the plan with its projected 17,000 jobs, while the remainder of the council was chagrined at the fact that there was no guarantee that the jobs would go to Richmonders. The city of San Pablo, whose lifeline is their card club, Casino San Pablo, was elated. The Guideville Band of Pomo Indians was given the opportunity of 150 days to create a non-casino plan for the site such as alternatives in the environmental report for a convention center, conference center, hotel, spa, and housing.

== Government ==
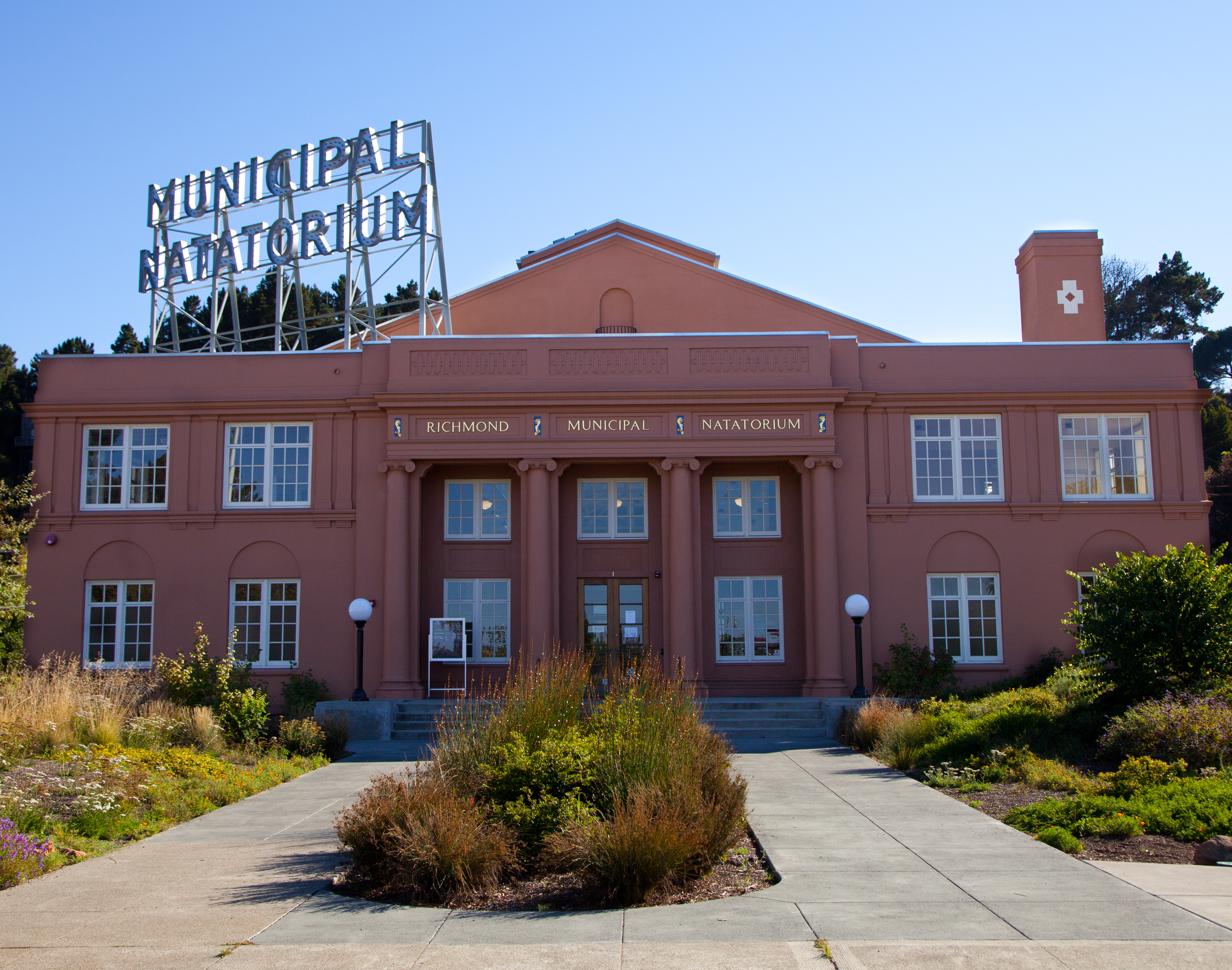
The Richmond Municipal Natatorium, commonly known as The Plunge, is a public swimming center.

The Richmond city government operates under a council-manager system with seven members (including mayor and vice mayor) elected to alternating four-year terms. Politically, the city is a Democratic stronghold. By the early 1990s, not a single Republican remained on the council. The city council has three Latinos, two African Americans, one White, and one Asian. (10/2026)

The position of Mayor rotated between members of the Richmond City Council until 1981, when the office became an elected position. George D. Carroll, who was voted by the City Council to become Mayor on July 6, 1964, was described at the time as "the first Negro mayor in California and first in America with the exception of small, scattered all-Negro communities in the Deep South,". George Livingston Sr. was the first elected African American mayor. He served from 1985 to 1993. Rosemary Corbin served as the mayor from 1993 to 2001. The current mayor Eduardo Martinez was elected Mayor of Richmond in 2022, winning 39% of the vote. Prior to winning the mayoral election, he had served on the Richmond City Council since 2014. Martinez, a former primary school teacher, is Richmond's first Latino mayor and a vocal critic of Chevron.

Years of political domination by the local firefighters union subsided after an FBI corruption investigation. In the early 2000s Gayle McLaughlin was the first Green elected to the council, with the support of the Richmond Progressive Alliance (RPA), a coalition of liberal Democrats, progressive independents, and Greens. In November 2006, McLaughlin was elected mayor, defeating incumbent first-term Mayor Irma Anderson. During McLaughlin's mayoralty (2007–2015), Richmond was the nation's largest city with a Green Party mayor.

In 2006, the city implemented a computer program that it had ordered from a German firm that provides the city with statistical interactive maps. These maps cover such areas as signage locations, streets, crime hot-spots, and zoning information. In 2007 the city won a contest in which its previously substandard website was upgraded and improved to make it more modern and functional. The prize includes two years of free webmastering.

Mayor McLaughlin and Councilperson Butt opposed Chevron's Renewal Project that would replace their 1950s era Hydrogen Manufacturing plant with a newer more efficient plant and would increase pollution by using dirtier, thicker, but cheaper crude oil.

The city of Richmond has eight community centers which are located within city parks. Many of the city's community centers were closed in the early 2000s following budget miscalculations and financial difficulties. In the 2006 city elections many candidates ran on platforms promising to reopen these community centers, most of which had been closed due to budget cuts. That election also featured a city sales tax increase, Measure Q, which failed.

There are 53 voting precincts in Richmond. Richmond has formerly been home to black culture and activist movements, most notably the Black Panther Party.

Richmond became the first city in the United States to pass a resolution for a ceasefire in the Gaza war on October 25, 2023, eighteen days after the outbreak of hostilities.

=== Cannabis ===
The city has eight cannabis dispensaries, and although the city has passed legislation approving them and has legalized their presence, city management does not accept their legality. In fact, the city had sued to close them. It is trying to enforce an injunction that would suspend their operating licenses. Although the city council has passed an ordinance permitting the dispensaries, city management refuses to cooperate with the spirit of the law because it has yet to take effect. The question remains whether the clubs will be closed before the law allowing them to open takes effect.

In 2019 the city approved "Power Plant Park" a marijuana farm consisting of 45 greenhouses on 18 acres north of North Richmond near Breuner Marsh and a solar farm. It is expected the create 500 new jobs and become a major economic contributor to the city.

=== Political party affiliation ===
According to the California Secretary of State, as of February 10, 2019, Richmond has 52,364 registered voters. Of those, 33,166 (63.3%) are registered Democrats, 2,979 (5.7%) are registered Republicans, 14,108 (26.9%) have declined to state a political party, and 4.1% are registered members of a third party.

== Education ==
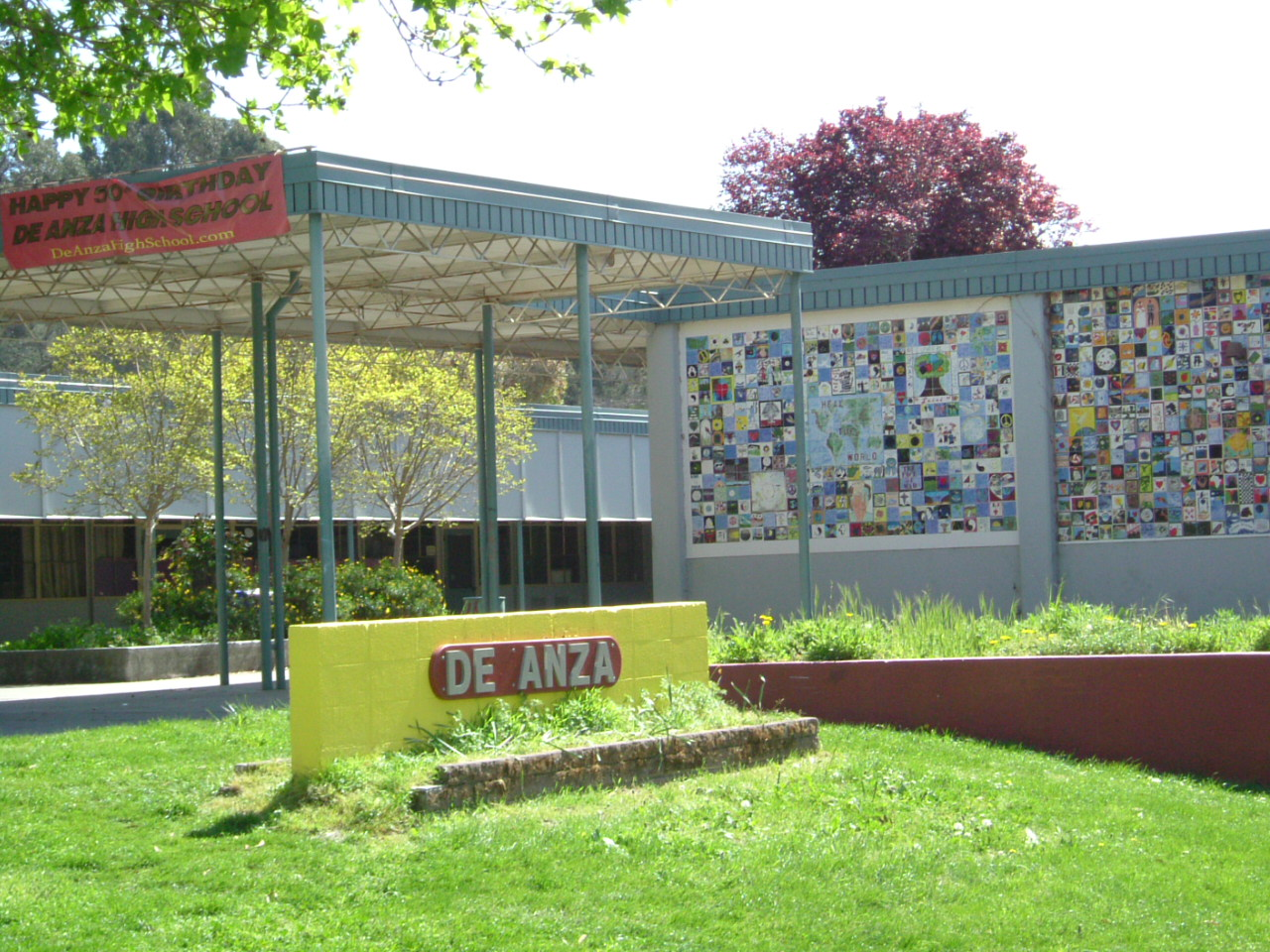
De Anza High School, located in Richmond's Eastern Valley area, also serves the nearby unincorporated areas.

The public schools in all portions of Richmond are administered by the West Contra Costa Unified School District, formerly the Richmond Unified School District. There are also many private schools, mostly Catholic schools under the authority of the Diocese of Oakland.

The city has four high schools: De Anza High School, Salesian College Preparatory, Richmond High School, and Kennedy High School. In addition, there are four charter high schools, Making Waves Academy, Aspire Richmond California College Preparatory Academy, Leadership Public Schools: Richmond and West County Community High School, although West County Community High School was shut down in 2012. In 2012, Richmond Charter Academy, part of the Amethod Public Schools system, opened a charter middle school. There are also three middle schools, 16 elementary schools, and seven elementary-middle schools. Richmond also hosts three adult education schools.

The Contra Costa Community College District serves all of Contra Costa County, and Richmonders who decide to attend a community college typically go to Contra Costa College, located in the neighboring city of San Pablo.

79.8% of Richmonders have a high school diploma or equivalent, compared with 84.2% nationally. But 27.1% have a bachelor's degree compared with a statistically similar 27.2% nationally.

Since an exit exam requirement was implemented for California high schools, the CAHSEE, some Richmond high school students have been protesting against it. Some students sued the district in an attempt to eliminate the requirement. In July 2007, a compromise was reached in which the district would provide two additional years of educational assistance for the purposes of passing the exam. That year, only 28% of Richmond High School students had passed the CAHSEE, a prerequisite for graduating.

=== Obesity ===
All Richmond schools have banned junk food, such as candy, soda, Twinkies, pizza, and other similar items in attempt to curb childhood obesity and change children's eating habits. It has been speculated that this was done preemptively, because some believe the state will soon mandate such restrictions. Despite these efforts, soda consumption in Richmond schools has not diminished. Furthermore, the current 32% of Richmond children who are obese will increase the current 24% adult obesity rate to 42% according to the Contra Costa County Health Services. This led the city council to approve a referendum on a 1 cent per ounce tax on beverages with a high sugar content for the 2012 elections, a first in the nation. The measure was opposed by councilmembers Corky Boozé and Nat Bates, who stated that he knew "many obese people that are perfectly healthy" and that it was "elitist" and "targeted black" people respectively. Members Jovanka Beckles and Jeff Ritterman – the latter a cardiologist – expressed horror at the obesity rate. Beckles chastized the other black members (Bates and Boozé) for not supporting the measure, as she found that the epidemic most affected people of color like themselves. The revenues would have been used to counter obesity through health and fitness campaigns and expenditures. The referendum was defeated by voters in the November 2012 election.

== Attractions and landmarks ==
Selected locations in Richmond, California
- Businesses
- Attractions
- Parks
1 Chevron Richmond Refinery / Eastern end of the Richmond–San Rafael Bridge
2 Brickyard Cove / Santa Fe Railroad Depot / Golden State Model Railroad Museum / Miller/Knox Regional Shoreline
3 Kaiser Shipyard No. 3 & SS Red Oak Victory
4 Ford Motor Company Assembly Plant / Rosie the Riveter/World War II Home Front National Historical Park Visitor Center / Lucretia Edwards Park, Harbor Way
5 Rosie the Riveter Memorial at Marina Bay Park
6 Macdonald Avenue / Macdonald 80 Shopping Center
7 Richmond Civic Center
8 Hilltop Horizon
9 Point Molate Beach Park
10 Kaiser Richmond Field Hospital, 1330 Cutting Blvd

The city of Richmond has dozens of parks, national historic parks, and 10 sites listed under the National Register of Historic Places.

=== Point Richmond ===
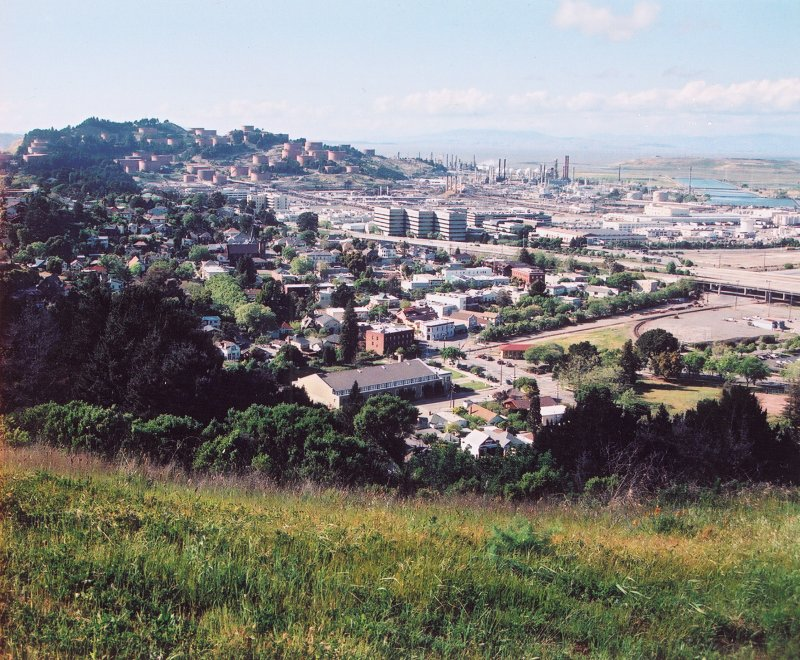
Point Richmond is one of the city's widely known neighborhoods; the Richmond Chevron Refinery and the marshlands are in the background.

Point Richmond, a neighborhood in Richmond, is known for its small-town appearance. The Point, as it is known by locals, offers owner-operated stores, coffee shops, historic benches, and streetlights. The Masquers Playhouse is a performing arts center that offers shows and productions year round. Hotel Mac is one of the oldest buildings in the area and has classic early 20th century architecture, like many other buildings in the area. There is also The Plunge, a natatorium which had been closed due to seismic safety issues but was re-opened in August 2010 after the retrofitting was completed. The city expressed a desire to demolish the building at one point, but this was halted by the actions of a neighborhood preservation campaign which continues its mission to "Save the Plunge!".

The Richmond–San Rafael Bridge extends 5.5 miles (8.9 km) across San Pablo Bay, entering Richmond just to the north of Point Richmond. The bridge is the origin of the term rollercoaster span, due to its curves, bumps, and appearance, which have also earned the bridge the nickname of the rollercoaster bridge. It was completed in 1957, and connects Contra Costa County with Marin County. Automobiles are charged a $8.50 toll in the westbound (towards Marin) direction only.

The Richmond Chevron Refinery occupies most of the land north of Point Richmond and the eastern end of the bridge. Some areas of this northern section are protected and publicly accessible, including Point Molate Beach Park, a park on the western coast of Richmond along Western Drive. It was originally a Chinese shrimp camp in the 1870s. On the northern end, near Point San Pablo, there is a yacht harbor that accommodates hundreds of private boats.

=== Brickyard Cove ===
The Ferry Point Tunnel is one of the oldest tunnels in California, connecting Point Richmond with Brickyard Cove to the south. Built in 1899, this structure still gives access to many attractions and neighborhoods in Brickyard Cove. The tunnel goes to the Golden State Railroad Museum, the USS Red Oak Victory, and many beaches and parks, and to Ferry Point where an abandoned ferry-rail pier stands with a historic ferry slip still standing, though somewhat damaged by fire. It can be viewed from an adjacent fishing pier.

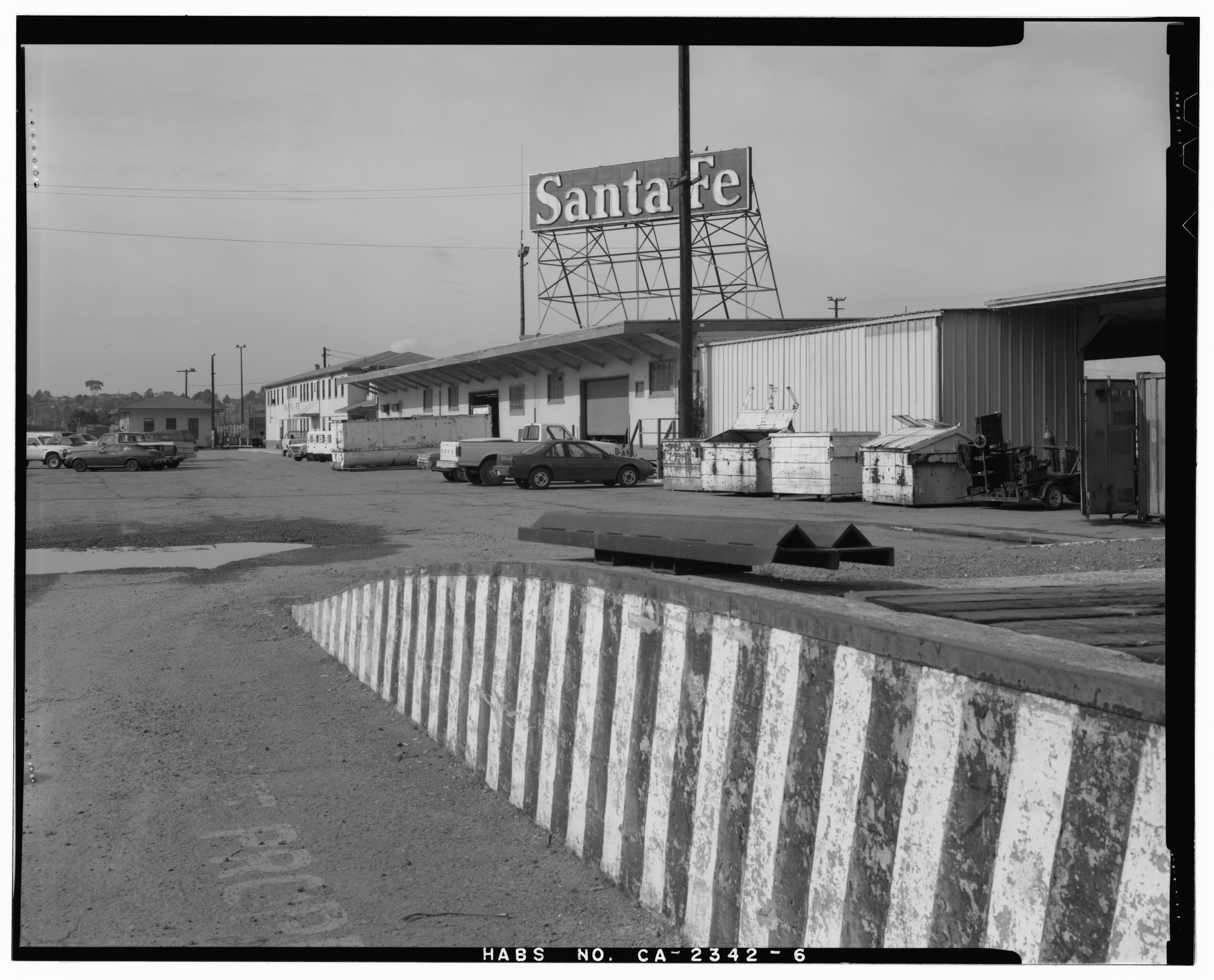
Santa Fe Railroad Depot

The Santa Fe Railroad established ferry service to San Francisco in 1900 and later built a station that operated as the western terminus for the railroad from 1903 to 1992. It has now been transformed into a museum to exemplify the feel of the terminal in that era. The Golden State Railroad Museum is a complex series of model railroad layouts in a museum in the Brickyard Cove area of Point Richmond. A visitor can operate trains of various eras, and there are miniature freight and passenger terminals, trestles, tunnels, and meticulously detailed town and city scenes, many of which are copied from real life scenes of the 1950s.

Keller Beach is one of the city's beaches, located at Miller/Knox Regional Shoreline, a park in Brickyard Cove. It offers picnicking, sunbathing, wading, and swimming. The beach is overlooked by vehicles exiting the Brickyard Cove drive, Ferry Point tunnel and houses on the steep cliffs above. The beach, as with most of the cove, offers spectacular panoramic bay views of the Oakland hills, bridges, the San Francisco skyline and the Golden Gate.

=== Southern waterfront / Shipyards ===
The Red Oak Victory at Ferry Point in Brickyard Cove, 2006

Further east, the USS Red Oak Victory is a restored World War II Victory ship, the 558th ship made in Richmond. It is moored in the former Richmond Shipyard No. 3. Liberty and Victory ships built in Richmond transported troops and supplies during World War II.

East across the Harbor/Santa Fe Channel, the Rosie the Riveter/World War II Home Front National Historical Park is in Richmond, and commemorates women's shipbuilding and support for the war effort in the 1940s. The visitor center is in a small utility building next to the former Ford Assembly Plant. Regular ferry service is provided to San Francisco from the Richmond Ferry Terminal via San Francisco Bay Ferry.

This area is connected by the San Francisco Bay Trail to several city parks along the waterfront, including Lucretia Edwards Shoreline Park, Marina Bay Park and the Rosie the Riveter Memorial, Barbara and Jay Vincent Park, and Shimada Friendship Park. The Bay Trail continues past these parks further southeast to Point Isabel Regional Shoreline and beyond to parks in El Cerrito, Albany, and Berkeley.

"We Can Do It!" image used in a marker designating the Rosie the Riveter/World War II Home Front National Historical Park

=== Civic Center ===
During World War II the city sprawled and its population increased dramatically. This led city leaders to construct the Richmond Civic Center, with buildings completed between 1949 and 1957. This center houses the city hall, a small convention center, library, hall of justice, police headquarters, and arts center.

Architectural Forum magazine called the new Memorial Civic Center: "a milestone in U.S. civic design: it is the first modern Civic Center built in any American city: and it is one of the most comprehensive centers constructed anywhere in the world."

The Richmond Public Library, the only public library independent of the Contra Costa County Public Libraries system, lies in the heart of the civic center. It houses over 204,686 books, 4,014 audio materials, 5,277 video materials, and 491 serial subscriptions.

=== Offshore ===
East Brother Light Station on East Brother Island (one of the Brother Islands) is host to an exclusive bed and breakfast. It is only accessible by private boat. Visitors come and stay for the day and picnic for free or they may pay for a room.

The Brooks Island Regional Preserve is on an island south of the Shipyards.

=== Others ===
The city is also home to a radio controlled model airplane airport, Breuner Airfield that is located in Breuner Marsh a contested piece of land near Point Pinole Regional Park in the Parchester Village neighborhood.

The city's cemeteries include Rolling Hills Memorial Park and St. Joseph Cemetery.

== Leisure and culture ==
Several regional parks administered by the East Bay Regional Park District lie within the city, including the Miller/Knox Regional Shoreline and the Point Pinole Regional Shoreline. They are linked by the San Francisco Bay Trail. Part of the former shipyard is now a marina.

The Richmond Art Center, founded by Hazel Salmi in 1936, is one of the oldest continually operating non-profit art centers on the entire West Coast of the United States. Its programming includes exhibitions, adult and youth education, and community initiatives. The center currently provides some of the only visual arts education programming in the city of Richmond, relying primarily on public donations and private grants as its means of support.

There is also the East Bay Center for the Performing Arts, Hilltop Multiplex, or Masquers Theaters in Point Richmond.

The Richmond Progressive Alliance and California Green Party are active political parties in Richmond. The House Rabbit Society has its national headquarters in Richmond.

=== Art ===
Richmond is home to the National Institute of Art and Disabilities Art Center, also known locally as the NIAD Art Center. NIAD is a non-profit organization hosting over sixty client artists weekly. NIAD's client artists' work can be seen at NIAD's on-site gallery, the Florence Ludins-Katz Gallery. NIAD has a gift shop.

The Richmond Art Center is a contemporary visual arts center, with a gallery and art classes in the heart of Richmond. A showcase for emerging and established artists, the Richmond Art Center hosts the annual "The Art of Living Black", art show which is a showcase of the artwork of Bay Area Black Artists. "Featuring over 50 local artists, the works include fine arts and crafts, paintings, sculpture, photography, prints, masks, stained glass, quilts, textile art, ceramics, jewelry and dolls." The beauty, the pain, the power and the eye of these black artists touch the soul deeply. Founded in 1936 by local artist Hazel Salmi, the Richmond Art Center is a Bay Area cultural institution.

In addition, East Bay Center for the Performing Arts has maintained its roots in the Richmond community since 1968. The Center engages youth and young adults in imagining and creating new worlds for themselves and new visions for their communities through the inspiration and discipline of rigorous training in world performance traditions.

The Hyphy subculture and subgenre of rap music originated in Richmond and surrounding cities.

From 1996 to 2002 a "geekfest" was held on the beach in Point Molate every few weeks or monthly by S.P.A.M. Records. The festival was a community service for under-21-year-olds.

=== Religion ===
There are dozens of houses of worship for various religions in the city, and some which are not represented in the city can be found nearby. Christian denominational churches include the Kingdom Hall of Jehovah's Witnesses; Word of Faith church; St. Peters C.M.E.; Kingdom Land Baptist Church; Grace Baptist Church; Grace Lutheran Church; Grace Lao Lutheran Church; Temple Baptist Church; Unity Church of Richmond; Holy Trinity Episcopal Church; First Mexican Baptist Church; Holy Mission Christian Center; St. David Catholic Church, Greater New Bethel Apostolic Ministries, formerly New Bethel Church of God in Christ, founded by Bishop A.D. Bradley in 1945; Faith Temple C.O.G.I.C., and Faith Tabernacle A.O.H. Church Of God; and the Largest Church in Richmond, Hilltop Community Church which is Assemblies of God. There is also a large Laotian Buddhist temple that serves as a community center for the Lao community of the East Bay. There is a synagogue in the Hilltop Green District.

=== Parks and recreation ===
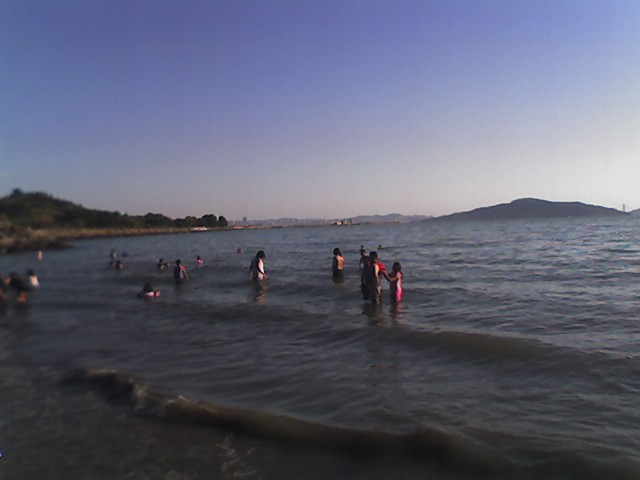
Beachgoers wading at Keller Beach in Miller/Knox Regional Shoreline in southern Richmond between Point Richmond and Brickyard Cove

The city has 292.6 acres (1.2 km^{2}) of parkland, which constitutes 1.5% of the city's land territory. The Rosie the Riveter World War II Home Front National Historical Park was established in 2000, encompassing the former Kaiser shipyards and other wartime industrial sites in Richmond. The park is a memorial to the six million women who labored on the home front, symbolized by the mythical figure "Rosie the Riveter". Richmond was selected for the park because it has many intact buildings that were constructed for 56 wartime industries. Its four shipyards produced an amazing 747 large ships and set production records. The home front changed Richmond from a predominantly rural community of 23,600 residents to a diverse population of over 100,000 people within a year. Industries operated around the clock and public housing, schools, day care centers, health care and merchants mobilized to support the new workforce that arrived on the city's doorstep. Fortunately, Richmond's turbulent and productive home front years were well chronicled and photographed. The National Park Service provides interpretive services and operates a Visitor Center in a former utility building next to the Ford Assembly Building.

Richmond also has number of local parks and two large regional parks are under the authority of the East Bay Regional Parks District, a consortium of most of the Parks and Recreation lands and facilities of Alameda and Contra Costa County.

Wildcat Canyon Regional Park is the city's largest park at 2,428 acres (10 km^{2}). The park once housed a dance hall and roller rink and has distinctive stonework throughout, which was the rationale for its placement on the National Register of Historic Places. It features San Pablo Creek, trails, forests, horseback riding, picnic areas, and a play structure for children, as well as horses for rent and mountain biking trails. High school students practice cross-country in the park. It is situated in the eastern Richmond hills and stretches into Berkeley's Tilden Regional Park in Alameda County. The park has diverse animal and plant life including great horned owls, opossums, king snakes, rubber boas, turkey vultures and many others.

Point Isabel Regional Shoreline is the largest off-leash dog park in the United States.

The Richmond Greenway is a project costing millions of dollars to transform an old rail line into a walking, jogging, and biking trail. It will span east to west from the end of the Ohlone Trail that follows the BART line from El Cerrito to Berkeley. It will also follow the BART line to Richmond station and continue to Point Richmond. Pedestrian bridges will be used to cross major avenues such as San Pablo Avenue and 23rd Street. An additional side project will add a bike lane/bike trail between the Richmond Greenway and the Ohlone trail at Potrero Avenue via 23rd Street, Carlson Boulevard, Cutting Boulevard, and Potrero. It is currently under construction.

Richmond is home to four marinas: the Brickyard Cove Yacht Club, Point San Pablo Yacht Club, Marina Bay Marina, and Channel Marina in the Santa Fe channel. In addition, Richmond has the "Richmond Plunge", a municipal natatorium dating back to 1926 and which reopened August 14, 2010. The pool is located in the Point Richmond neighborhood.

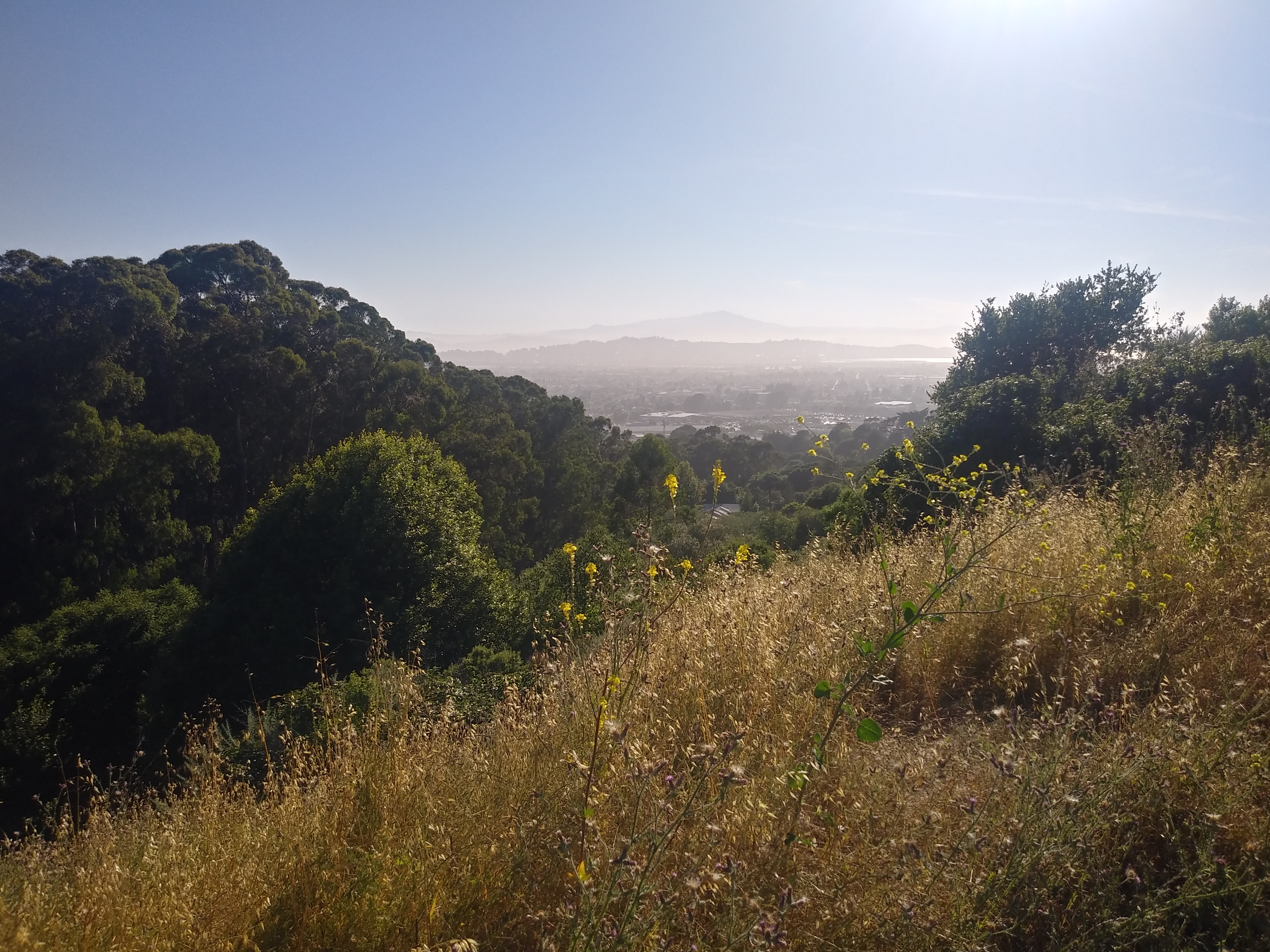
Richmond as seen from Wildcat Canyon Regional Park

== Celebrations and conferences ==
The city has annual Juneteenth and Cinco de Mayo celebrations. The Cinco de Mayo celebrations sponsored by the 23rd Street Merchant's Association attracts thousands and closes the entire length of the roadway. The Richmond Police Department, Fire Brigade, United States Marine Corps and other organizations participate in the parade. This is in addition to a fireworks show at Marina Bay celebrating the July 4 and a Silly Parade, an event where people march down the street and generally act "weird" and silly. The city also participates in various Earth Day activities. The city hosts an annual and a physical activity and nutrition forum to discuss health in the community, it has been running since 2006. In 2010 the city began celebrating the Richmond Native American Pow-Wow in Nicholl Park, in 2012 this included area politicians and members of over 50 tribes from throughout the country.

== Media ==
=== Newspapers ===
There are two African American weekly newspapers, one general interest online publication, and one multimedia news project that cover Richmond exclusively. The Richmond Post and Richmond Globe publish print and online editions. RichmondConfidential.org, which is run by the UC Berkeley Graduate School of Journalism, is a general interest online-only news publication serving the city of Richmond. Richmond Pulse is a youth-led print and online publication which focuses on community health. The West County Times, run by Media News Group, covers greater Contra Costa County.

=== Television ===
A local cable TV station, KCRT-TV, mainly plays historical archives but also airs government-access television (GATV), city council meetings and music videos.

=== Radio ===
KKSF (AM) transmits from towers at Point Isabel.

== Infrastructure ==
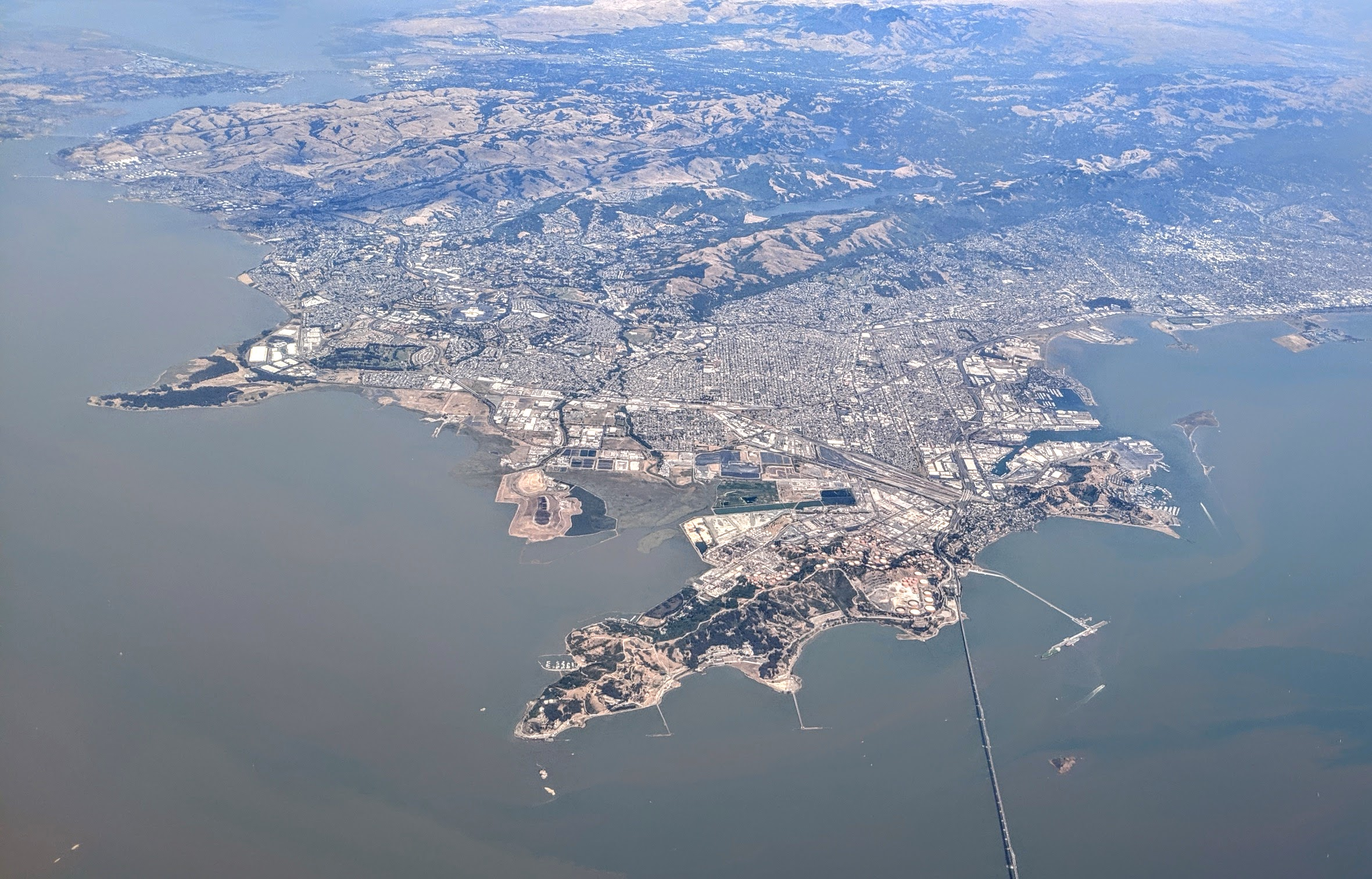
Aerial view of Richmond from the west, with the Richmond–San Rafael Bridge, the Port of Richmond, and the petroleum ship terminals

=== Port of Richmond ===
The Port of Richmond, located in along the city's southern coast beside the Richmond Inner Harbor, handles the third-largest shipping tonnage in California annually, a total of 19 million short tons. It ranks number one for ports of the San Francisco Bay for vehicles and liquid bulk. In addition to these commodities, the port can also handle dry-bulk, break-bulk, and containers. Seven of the terminals are city-owned, in addition to five dry docks, while there are 11 privately owned terminals. The port is served by a rail network operated by four major rail companies.

=== Roadways ===
==== Highways and expressways ====
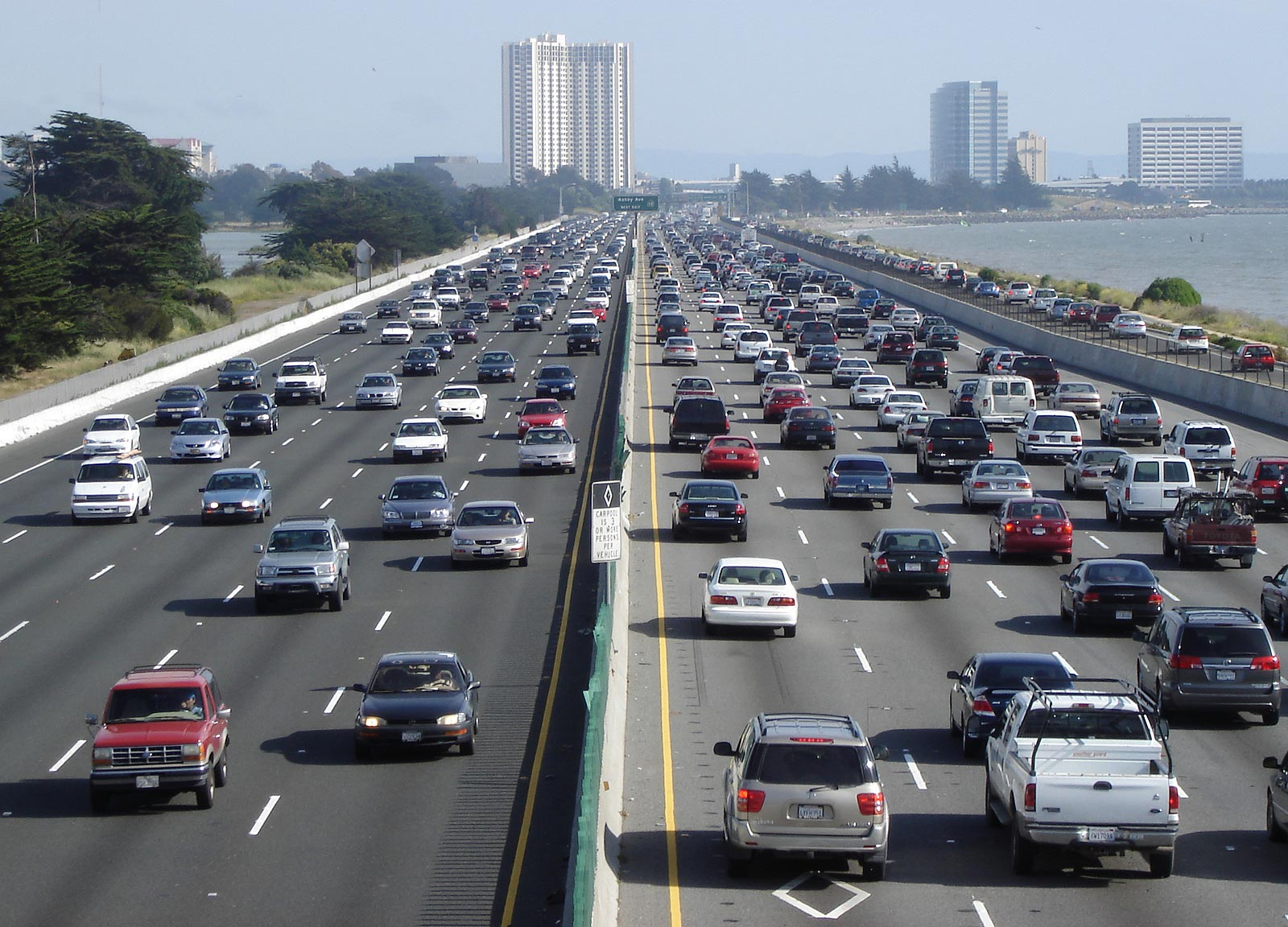
Looking south above Interstate 80, the Eastshore Freeway, on a Saturday afternoon. Emeryville, California, is at the towers. To the right is the east shore of the San Francisco Bay.

- Interstate 80 cuts through the eastern and northeastern portions of the city, through a mostly residential area, connecting to Pinole, Hercules and then on to Vallejo via the Carquinez Bridge in the eastbound direction, and through Albany, Berkeley, Emeryville and eventually terminating in San Francisco via the Bay Bridge in the westbound direction. The weekday westbound morning commute on I-80 through Richmond lies within the most congested stretch of freeway in the Bay Area, according to Caltrans, and has been ranked as such since 2001.
- Interstate 580 curves along the southern waterside of Richmond and merges into I-80 in Albany in the southern Oakland/San Francisco direction while slicing through mixed medium and heavy industries and homes through Point Richmond and onto the Richmond–San Rafael Bridge over the San Pablo Bay segment of the San Francisco Bay into San Rafael and Marin County.
- The Richmond Parkway, built between the early 1990s and early 2000s, connects I-580 in the Point Richmond area in the southwest to the Hilltop Area and I-80, and runs along the city's heavily industrial western side and through the unincorporated area of North Richmond. It has been proposed that it be upgraded to a state highway and be redesignated: State Route 93 and transferred to the authority of Caltrans.
- San Pablo Avenue (State Route 123) runs through Richmond and San Pablo to Pinole, Hercules and to its terminus in Crockett, and south through El Cerrito, Albany, Emeryville, and Berkeley, until it runs into Frank Ogawa Plaza in Oakland.

==== Major trunk streets ====
- Macdonald Avenue is the "Main Street" of Richmond, running east–west from Atchison Village through downtown to San Pablo Avenue in the North & East neighborhood. In 2010, it was repaved and refitted with new lampposts, street furniture, business façades, landscaping and trees.
- Cutting Boulevard parallels Macdonald Avenue to the south, traveling from Point Richmond to Arlington Ave. near the top of the hills. It is a busy commercial and commute route. In 1990, a major improvement program was designed by the city also involving Knox Freeway. It is named after the founder of the Port of Richmond, Henry Cutting.
- 23rd Street runs through the heart of the city north–south from where it turns to Marina Bay Parkway at I-580 through this heavily Latino business district and neighborhood to San Pablo Avenue in the city of San Pablo.
- Barrett Avenue parallels Macdonald Ave two blocks north; it is slightly less traveled and has less activity than Macdonald.
- Marina Bay Parkway serves as a link between I-580 and the Marina Bay neighborhood, it turns into 23rd street after crossing 580.
- Marina Way and Harbour Way/Harbour Way South (formerly 14th Street and 10th Street, respectively) run north–south.
- Giant Highway, named for the former Giant Powder Company, runs in the northern part of town between San Pablo Avenue and the Leroy Heights neighborhood.
- Hilltop Drive is a trunk street which runs from Richmond Parkway, crosses San Pablo Avenue, passes The Shops at Hilltop and continues over Interstate 80 into the neighboring city of El Sobrante.
- Carlson Boulevard (formerly Pullman Avenue) is the primary access from Downtown Richmond to the Richmond Annex neighborhood, starting from 23rd Street and terminating at San Pablo Avenue just north of the Alameda–Contra Costa county boundary, feeding into the El Cerrito Plaza shopping center.

=== Public transportation ===
The city's primary transportation hub is Richmond station. It is served by Bay Area Rapid Transit (BART) Red Line and Orange Line service, plus Amtrak Capitol Corridor, Gold Runner, and California Zephyr regional rail and intercity rail service.

The primary bus service in Richmond is operated by AC Transit, which runs 14 bus lines in the city. Service includes a number of local routes, rapid route 72R along San Pablo Avenue, transbay commuter service across the Bay Bridge to the Salesforce Transit Center and limited All-Nighter service. Additional local service is operated by WestCAT, including a park and ride facility at the Richmond Parkway Transit Center. Bear Transit provides commuter and student service from El Cerrito del Norte BART station and UC Berkeley to the UC Field Station in Campus Bay on route RFS. Several regional bus operators serve El Cerrito del Norte station (just south of Richmond) rather than Richmond station because of the former station's proximity to I-80.

Before AC Transit and BART, the Key System provided a network of several rail lines on the East Shore and Suburban Railway.

=== Commercial and cargo rail ===
The Union Pacific Railroad (UP) has a mainline passing through Richmond. This line was formerly operated by the Southern Pacific Railroad (SP).

The BNSF Railway (BNSF) has a yard and that serves as the Northern California terminus of their line that goes to their main classification yard at Barstow via the San Joaquin Valley. The track was formerly operated by the Atchison, Topeka and Santa Fe Railway (ATSF). Many years ago, the ATSF offered rail car ferry service from Point Richmond to San Francisco. The partially burnt remnants of the ferry pier can still be seen at Point Richmond.

The Richmond Pacific Railroad (RPRC) is a class III shortline railroad operating on 2.5 miles (4.0 km) of track, providing switching services at Richmond's wharves. The RPRC is owned by the Levin-Richmond Terminal Corporation and was formerly known as the Parr Terminal Railroad (PRT).

=== Ferry ===
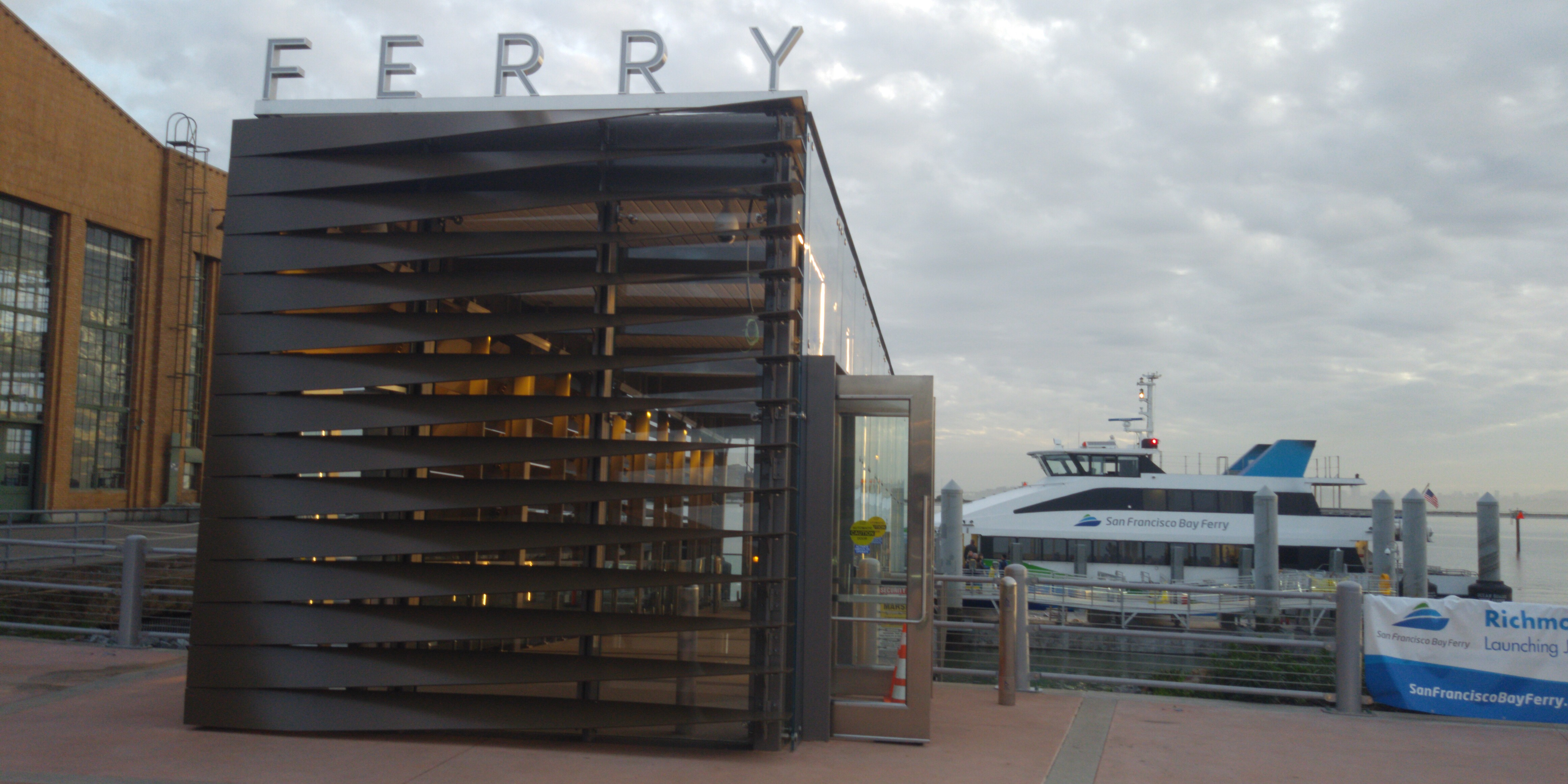
Richmond Ferry Terminal

The San Francisco Bay Ferry relaunched ferry service to the San Francisco Ferry Building in January 2019. The service runs from the Craneway Pavilion in Marina Bay to the San Francisco Ferry Building seven days a week, with lower frequency on the weekends as opposed to higher volume weekday commutes. Schedules call for a 35-minute commute from the Marina Bay Terminal to San Francisco Ferry Building in either direction.

Historically, Richmond had commuter ferry service from the Richmond Ferry Terminal to the San Francisco Ferry Building on weekdays and Fisherman's Wharf on weekends in addition to special Giants Ballpark service during the baseball season. The voyage took approximately 45 minutes each way. The service began in 1999, but was discontinued in the late 2000s in the economic downturn following the dot-com bust. Ferry ridership plummeted and the service became economically unsustainable, which led Red and White Fleet to discontinue the service. The Richmond ferry terminal is at Ford Point located adjacent to the historic Ford Plant in Marina Bay which is now open as an industrial park and under renovation. The terminal had its own dedicated AC Transit feeder service from Point Richmond and downtown Richmond with route 374 also now discontinued. A new ferry service from Richmond is planned for 2018 by the San Francisco Bay Area Water Transit Authority. The new ferry will take only half an hour to San Francisco and will use the existing terminal and parking facilities at Ford Point in Marina Bay. The San Francisco Bay Ferry relaunched ferry service to the San Francisco Ferry Building in January 2019.

=== Pedestrian and bike lanes ===
The city has aggressively developed its portions of the San Francisco Bay Trail and has more than any other city at present. The total length is 17 miles (27 km) and more is to be built. The city is also currently developing the Richmond Greenway a rails to trails project running parallel to Macdonald Avenue which will feed into the Ohlone Trail which serves as feeder service for the El Cerrito del Norte BART station. There is also the Hercules Bikeway connecting the Ohlone Trail with Hercules, which runs along the neighborhoods of East Richmond and El Sobrante. There is a trail under construction along Wildcat Creek to connect the Bay Trail and Wildcat Marsh with Wildcat Canyon Regional Park. The city also has many miles of trails in that park in addition to Miller/Knox, Point Isabel, and Point Pinole parks, among others.

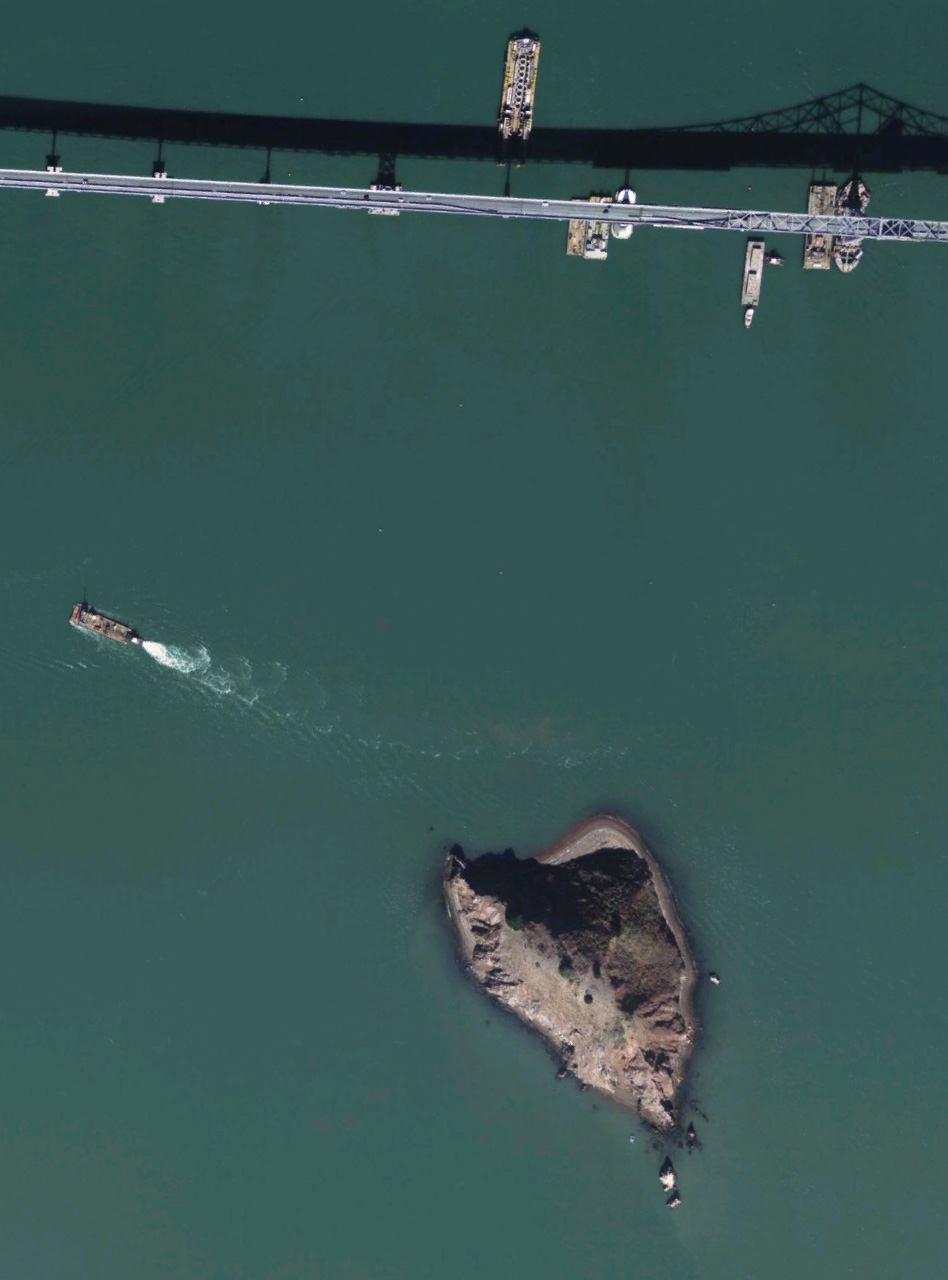
The Richmond–San Rafael Bridge (Interstate 580) alongside Red Rock Island and barges crossing San Pablo Bay.

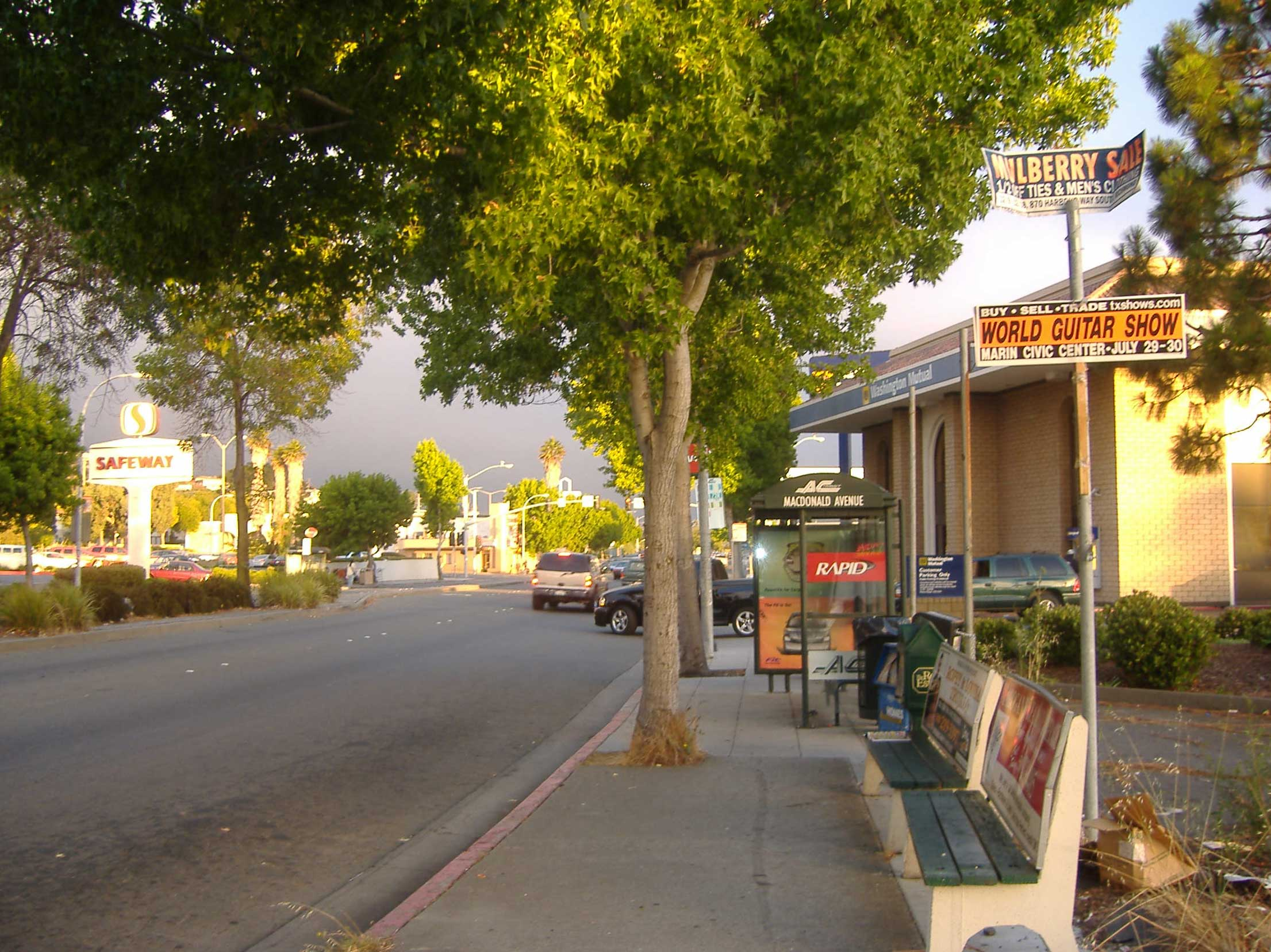
Tree-lined San Pablo Avenue at Macdonald Avenue with an AC Transit BRT stop and businesses in eastern Richmond.

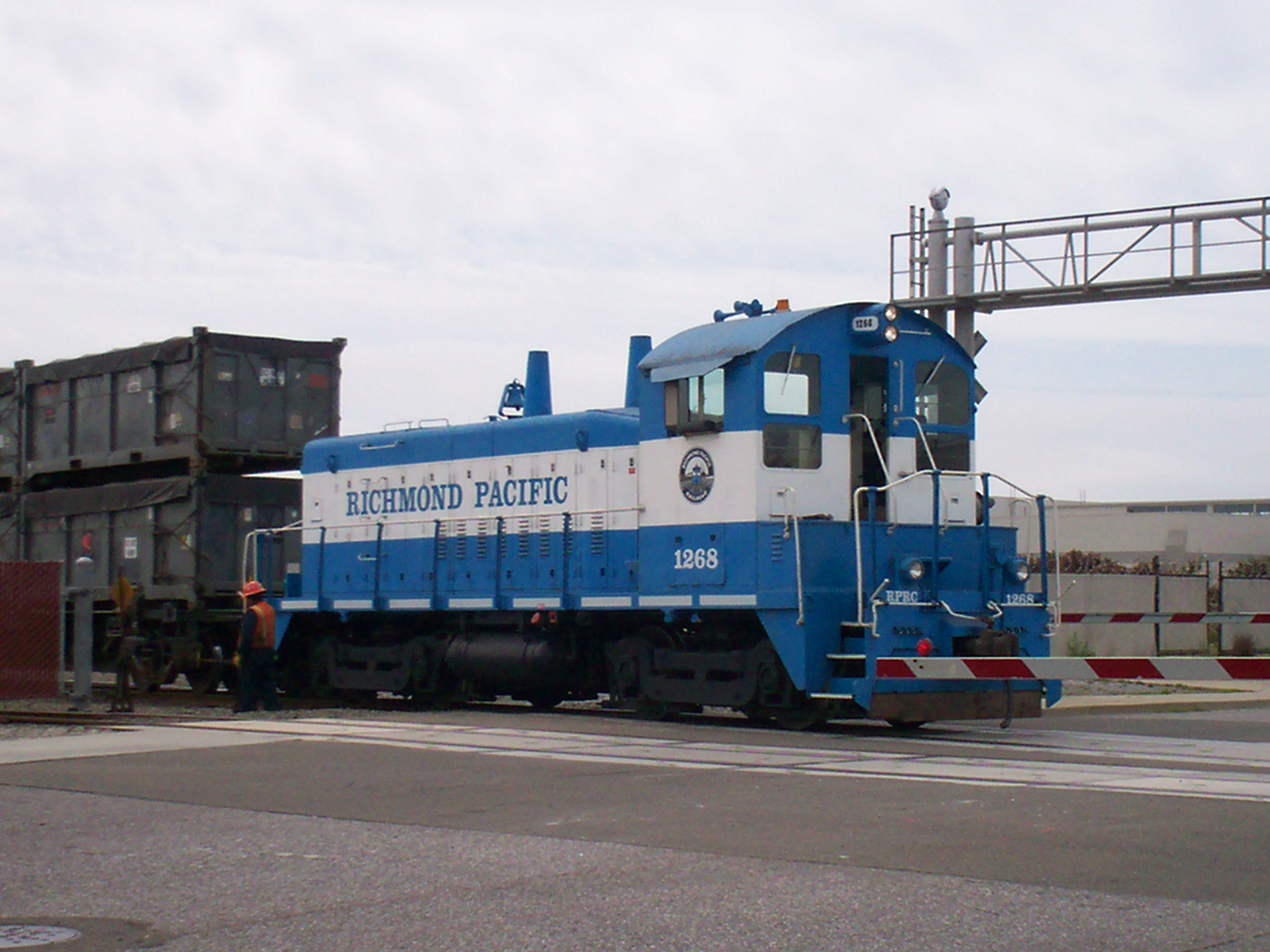
A freight train of the Richmond Short Railroad

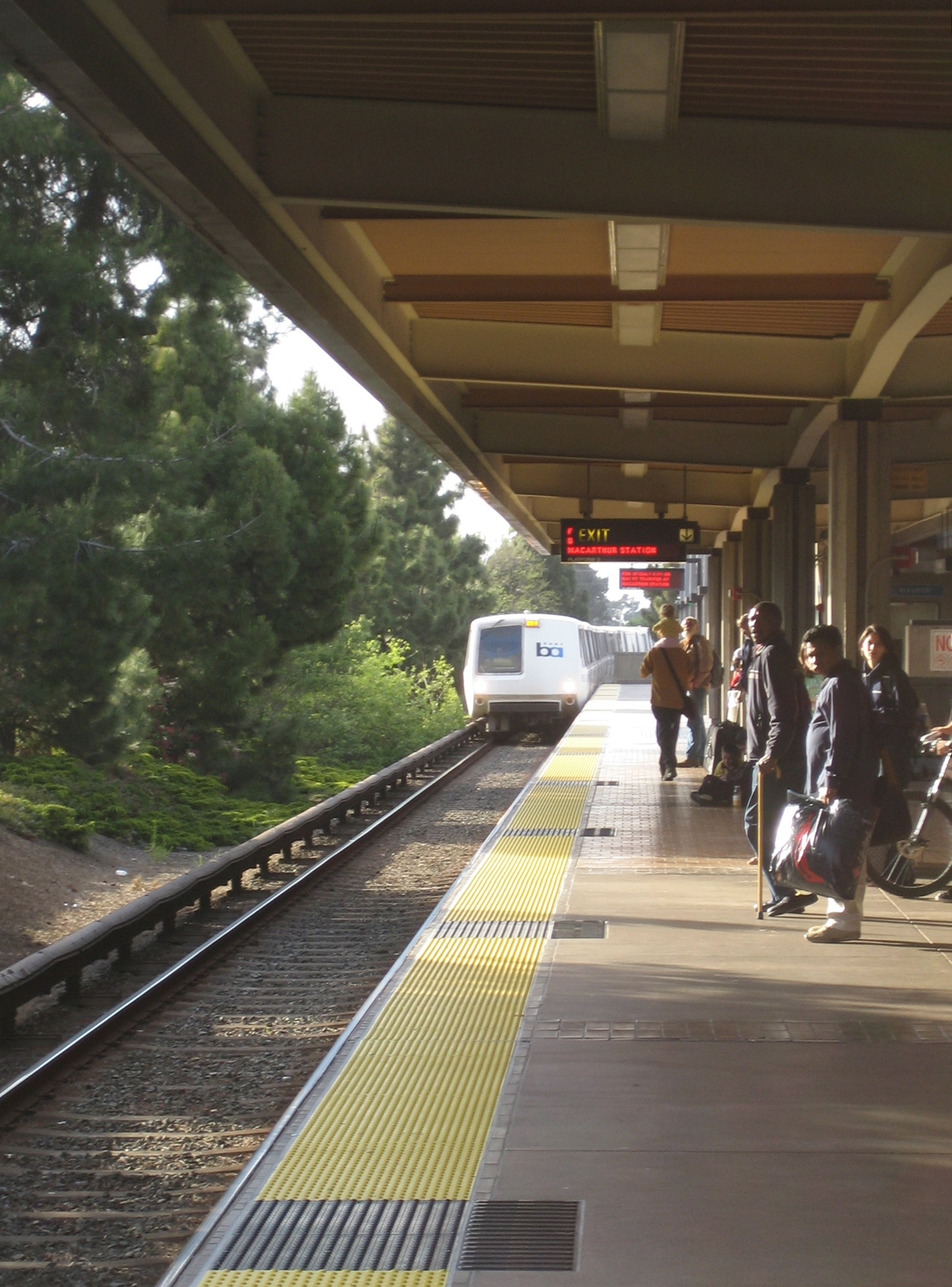
Richmond BART Station within the intermodal Richmond Station which carries 1.9 million passengers annually.

== Municipal services ==
Dozens of parks are run by the Richmond Parks & Recreation Department. The Richmond Civic Center is currently undergoing a seismic upgrade and renovations program. Some buildings are being refurbished while other buildings will be replaced.

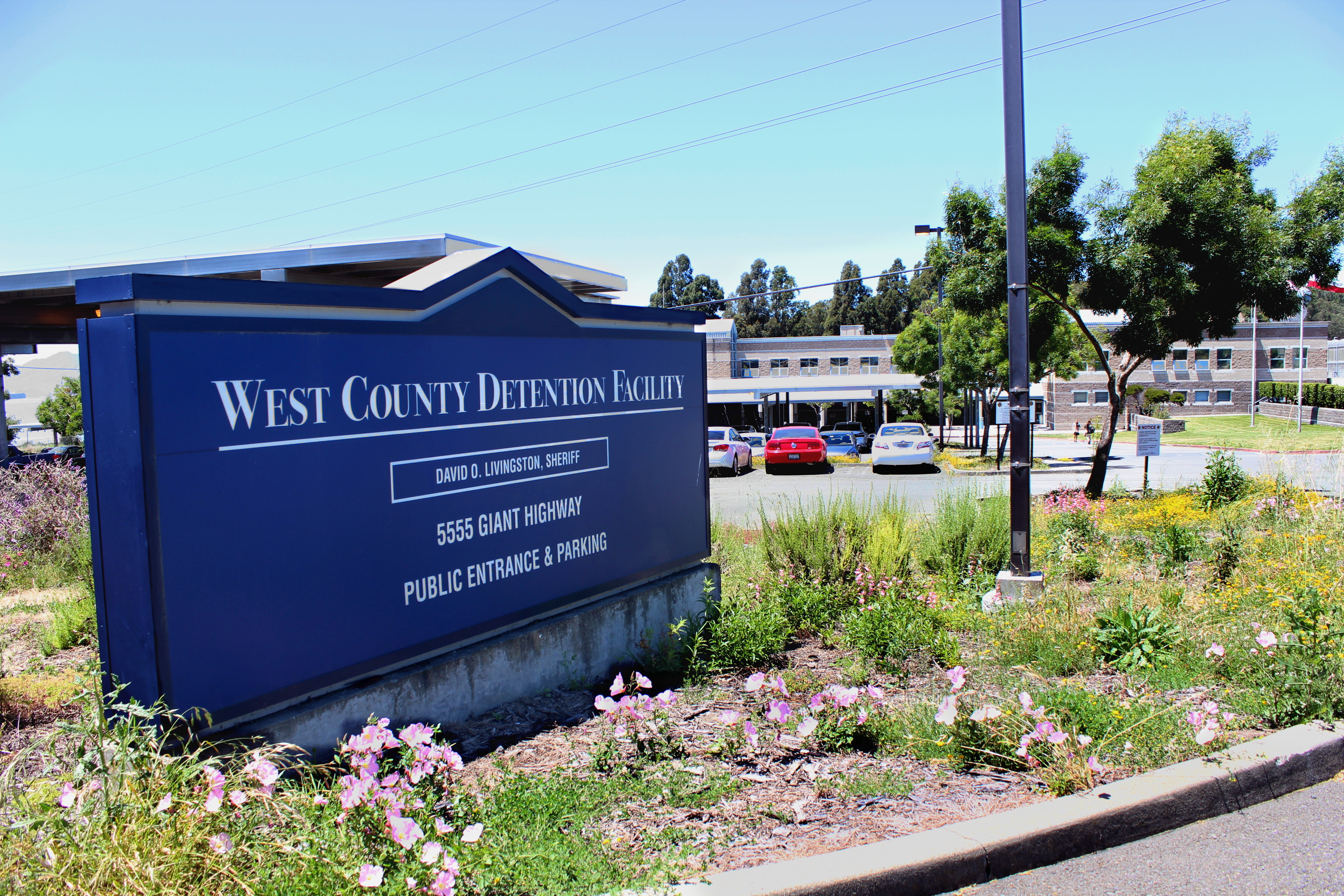
West County Detention Facility on Giant Highway

Richmond is also home to the West County Detention Facility in the Point Pinole area. It is a male and female county jail.

RichmondWorks and Richmond Summer YouthWorks are city programs that aim to decrease unemployment and crime and have led to hundreds receiving employment at area retail businesses.

Richmond's waste disposal and recycling is handled by the Richmond Sanitary Service. Water is provided by the East Bay Municipal Utility District (EBMUD), while sewers are operated by the city government. The city's electricity and gas is provided by the Pacific Gas & Electric Company (PG&E).

Sewage is largely handed by the Richmond Sewage Treatment Plant in Point Richmond.

Medical and trauma patients are transported by American Medical Response Paramedics and EMTs.

=== Fire Department ===
Richmond Fire Department
Operational area
- Country: United States
- State: California
- City: Richmond

Agency overview
- Employees: 95+(2014)
- Staffing: Career
- Fire chief: Adrian Sheppard
- EMS level: BLS
- IAFF: 188

Facilities and equipment
- Battalions: 1
- Stations: 7
- Engines: 7
- Trucks: 1
- Rescues: 2
- HAZMAT: 1
- Fireboats: 1

Website
- Official website

The Richmond Fire Department is the fire and rescue service for Richmond, and by contract with Contra Costa County it also serves East Richmond Heights, and North Richmond. The department is responsible for an area of 56.1 square miles (145 km^{2}). The department has seven fire stations in the city.

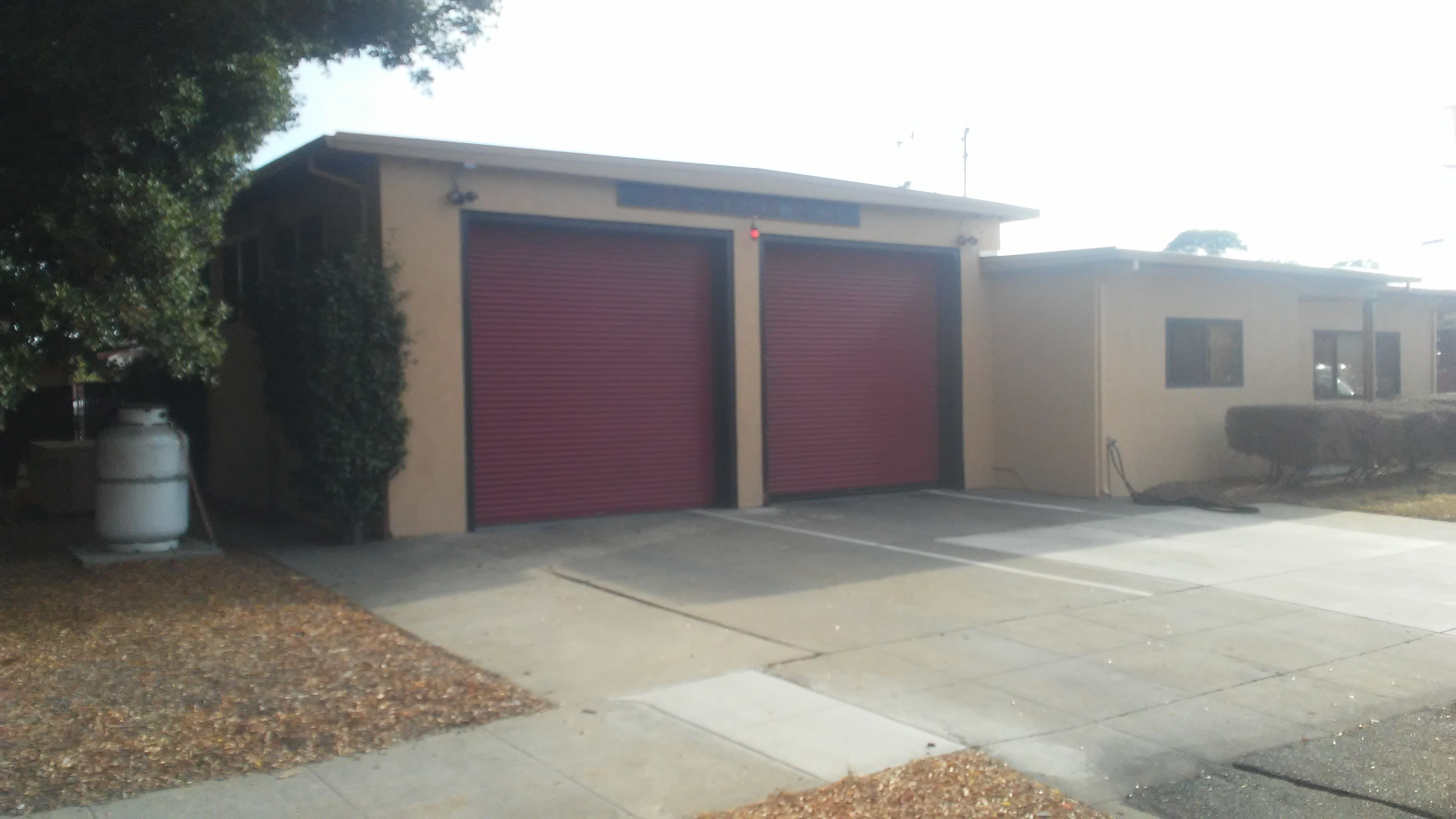
RFD station 66 in North & East

In September 2002 the city coordinated an eight alarm fire call at the Richmond Sanitary Service landfill. After putting the fire out steam continued to spew forcing crews to remain on site for hours to water the still heated area in order to prevent reignition.

=== Police department ===
The Richmond Police Department, first organized in 1909, is now headquartered at the Richmond Civic Center. The building was recently renovated, and is LEED certified.

== Notable people ==
=== Athletics ===
- Brian Abshire (born 1963), Olympic track and field athlete, 1988 Summer Olympics in 3,000-meter steeplechase
- C. J. Anderson, running back for NFL's Denver Broncos
- Courtney Anderson (born 1980), Oakland Raiders football player
- Benny Barnes, Stanford and NFL player, 11 years as cornerback for Dallas Cowboys, starter for Super Bowl XII champions
- Ken Carter (born 1959), Richmond High School basketball coach, inspiration for 2005 film Coach Carter
- Loyd Christopher, MLB player and scout
- Russ Christopher, MLB pitcher for 1948 World Series champion Cleveland Indians
- Darrell Johnson, MLB player, backup catcher for New York Yankees behind Yogi Berra; also played with St. Louis Cardinals; manager for Boston Red Sox, Seattle Mariners and Texas Rangers
- Ricky Jordan (born 1965), MLB first baseman for Philadelphia Phillies, Seattle Mariners
- Willie McGee (born 1958), MLB player, outfielder for 1982 World Series champion St. Louis Cardinals, two-time National League batting champion, 1985 MVP
- Takkarist McKinley, NFL player for Atlanta Falcons
- Dave Smith (born 1955), MLB pitcher for Houston Astros, Chicago Cubs, and San Diego Padres
- Dale Sveum, MLB player and former manager of Chicago Cubs
- Lamont Thompson (born 1978), NFL football defensive back for Tennessee Titans and Cincinnati Bengals

=== Music ===
- Jason Becker (born 1969), musician, songwriter and composer
- Stephen Bradley, musician, producer, and touring member of band No Doubt
- Tom Brock (1942 – 2002), singer and songwriter
- Billie Joe Armstrong (born 1972), lead singer and musician from the band Green Day was born in Richmond.
- Peter Buck (born 1956), guitarist for rock band R.E.M.
- Norton Buffalo (born Phillip Jackson; 1951–2009), twice Grammy-nominated singer and songwriter, country and blues harmonica, toured 32 years with Steve Miller.
- Canary Lee Burton (born 1942), composer and keyboardist
- Les Claypool (born 1963), bassist, songwriter and vocalist of Primus
- Gary Holt (born 1964), guitarist and founding member of Exodus; also a member of Slayer since 2011.
- Iamsu! (born 1989), rapper and fellow organizer of The HBK Gang.
- Larry LaLonde (born 1968), guitarist in Primus
- Locksmith (born 1984), rapper.
- Master P (born Percy Robert Miller), rapper, founder and owner of P. Miller clothing, former local businessman

- Also connected to Master P: Silkk Tha Shocker, Lil Romeo, both relatives/associates of Master P, and Big Ed (formerly under Master P's No Limit Records) were residents of Richmond

- Dorothy Morrison (born 1944), lead singer for Edwin Hawkins Singers on their hit "Oh Happy Day"

=== Other ===
- Joseph K. Ballard (born 1979),Pro Bowler, Co-Founder Of One Last Ride LLC
- Peter S. Beagle (born 1939), writer, author of the fantasy novel The Last Unicorn
- David DePape (born 1980), Canadian convicted in assault of Paul Pelosi
- Lucretia Edwards (1916–2005), preservation activist and environmentalist
- Carl Franklin (born 1949), director of films such as Devil in a Blue Dress and One True Thing
- William Haynes, comedian, co-host of the YouTube channel SourceFed.
- Janet Lipkin (born 1948), Artwear clothing designer, visual artist and educator
- Emiko Nakano (1925–1990), abstract expressionist artist
- Glenn Plummer (born 1961), actor, known for films such as South Central, Showgirls and Menace II Society
- Ronnie Schell (born 1931), actor and comedian
- Betty Reid Soskin (1921–2025), park ranger, educator, and activist
- Ryan Coogler (born 1986), award-winning director of films such as Fruitvale Station and Sinners (2025 film)

== Neighborhoods ==
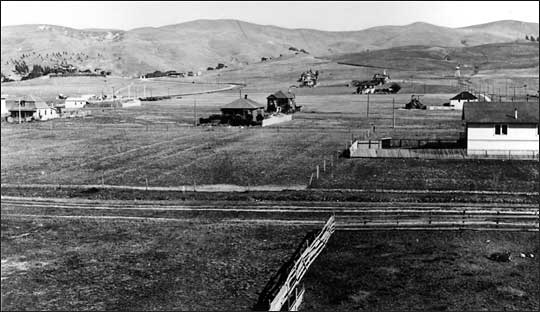
Richmond Heights as seen from North & East at the dawn of the 20th century

Richmond has many distinct neighborhoods. The city can roughly be divided into the northern Hilltop/El Sobrante, eastern Central/East Richmond, downtown/Iron Triangle and Southern Point Richmond/Marina Bay areas.

== In literature and film ==
=== Books ===
- Cole, Susan D. (1980). Richmond – Windows to the Past. Richmond, CA: Wildcat Canyon Books. ISBN 0936034009. An oral history based photographic history.
- Sutherland, Anne (1986). Gypsies: The Hidden Americans. Waveland Press. ISBN 9780881332353. This book is an anthropological study of a group of Romani Americans living in Richmond (Barvale), California; based on fieldwork done during 1968–1970.
- Polese, James (1995). Tales from the Iron Triangle: Boyhood Days in the San Francisco Bay Area of the 1920s. Ocean Tree Books. ISBN 9780943734125.
- Lange, Dorothea (1995). Photographing the Second Gold Rush: Dorothea Lange and the East Bay at War, 1941-1945. Charles Wollenberg (contributions). Heyday Books. ISBN 9780930588786.
- In Contempt (Mass Market Paperback) by Christopher A. Darden, Jess Walter, ReganBooks; Reprint edition (February 1997) (Christopher Darden, one of the prosecutors in the criminal case against O.J. Simpson, grew up in Richmond.)
- Moore, Shirley Ann Wilson (2001). To Place Our Deeds: The African American Community in Richmond, California, 1910–1963. George Gund Foundation imprint in African American studies. University of California Press. ISBN 9780520229204.
- Bastin, Donald (2003). Richmond. Images of America. Arcadia Publishing. ISBN 9780738528588.
- Brown, Rodney (2013). If My Eyes Could Rewind: The Real Richmond, California story. SEP Publishing. ISBN 9780988845121.
- Early, Steve (2017). Refinery Town: Big Oil, Big Money, and the Remaking of an American City. Bernie Sanders (contribution). Beacon Press. ISBN 9780807094273.
- The Color of Law: A Forgotten History of How Our Government Segregated America by Richard Rothstein (2017)

=== Film and television ===
- The film documentary "Enough is Enough: Live From Tent City in Richmond, CA," details a grassroots movement of Richmond city residents to fight violence on their streets.
- Much of the movie Tucker: The Man and His Dream was filmed at the National Preservation Award-winning Ford Assembly Building, now commonly referred to as Ford Point.
- Many scenes from the Robin Williams film, Patch Adams were filmed during a week in Point Richmond.
- The basketball movie, Coach Carter although filmed across the bay in San Francisco was based on the story of the Richmond High School Basketball team being benched for poor grades despite an undefeated season.
- In the TV show The Game, character Latasha "Tasha" Mack grew up in Richmond.
- Many parts of the Mel Gibson movie Forever Young were filmed in Point Richmond.
- DeVry College has made a commercial showing businesses along San Pablo Avenue in Richmond.
- Kaiser Permanente made a commercial showing a man riding a bicycle in Point Richmond.
- In the 2002 movie, The Sweetest Thing starring Cameron Diaz and Christina Applegate, the town of Somerset, where an important wedding scene takes place, includes filming in the historic Point Richmond district (not the church itself however).

== Sister cities ==
Richmond, California has three sister cities, as designated by Sister Cities International:

- Shimada, Shizuoka, Japan (December 12, 1961)
- Regla, Cuba
- Zhoushan, Zhejiang, China

== See also ==
- East Richmond Heights
- El Sobrante
- Harry Ells High School
- North Richmond
- Point Richmond
- Richmond Annex, Richmond, California
- Rosie the Riveter/World War II Home Front National Historical Park
- USS Tacoma
- List of U.S. cities with large Hispanic populations

== Bibliography ==
- "Feature Detail Report for: Richmond". Geographic Names Information System. United States Geological Survey.
