= List of Richmond, California neighborhoods =

This is a list of neighborhoods in Richmond, California, United States.

- Atchison Village
- Belding Woods
- Brickyard Cove
- Carriage Hills
- Castro Heights
- Central Richmond
- City Center
- Coronado
- Cortez/Stege
- Crescent Park
- Country Club Vista
- Downtown (Richmond)
- East Richmond
- Eastshore
- El Sobrante Hills
- Fairmede/Hilltop
- Greenbriar
- Green Ridge Heights
- Hasford Heights
- Hilltop Bayview
- Hilltop District
- Hilltop Green
- Hilltop Village
- Iron Triangle
- Laurel Park
- Marina Bay
- May Valley
- North & East
- Panhandle Annex
- Parchester Village
- Park Plaza
- Parkview
- Point Isabel
- Point Richmond
- Pullman
- Quail Hill
- Richmond Annex
- Richmond Heights (Mira Vista, Richmond View)
- Richmore Village/Metro Square
- Santa Fe
- Shields-Reid
- Southwest Richmond Annex
