= Redevelopment agency =

Government body dedicated to urban renewal

A redevelopment agency (RDA) is a government body dedicated to urban renewal. Typically it is a municipal level city department focused on a particular district or corridor that has become neglected or blighted (a community redevelopment agency or CRA). In many cases this is the city's original downtown that has been supplanted in importance by a regional shopping center. Redevelopment efforts often focus on reducing crime, destroying unsuitable buildings and dwellings, restoring historic features and structures, and creating new landscaping, housing and business opportunities mixed with expanded government services and transportation infrastructure.

At one time, California had as many as 400 redevelopment agencies supported by tax increment financing. The 2008–2012 California budget crisis led to the dissolution of all redevelopment agencies in the state by February 1, 2012. Each redevelopment agency was replaced by a "successor agency to the redevelopment agency" that managed the wind-down process under the auspices of the California Department of Finance.

== Examples ==
- The Las Vegas Redevelopment Agency has created many projects that have led to jobs growth and city beautification.
- The city of Richmond, California used its agency to refurbish Macdonald Avenue, Macdonald 80 Shopping Center the city's downtown and a transit village at the Richmond BART/Amtrak station and the creating of the Richmond Greenway among many other projects.
- The city of Fremont, California engaged in a redevelopment of Irvington station, focused on transit oriented development.
- The San Jose Redevelopment Agency redeveloped about 16% of the city's area, including Downtown San Jose.
