= Richmond Greenway =

Multi-use path in Richmond, California

Coordinates: 37.93131°N 122.33992°W

The Richmond Greenway is a pedestrian and bicycle path in Richmond, California.

== Route ==
It runs along what was formerly the right-of-way of the Atchison, Topeka and Santa Fe Railway (formerly the California and Nevada Railroad) parallel to Ohio Avenue, between the end of the Ohlone Greenway adjacent to the intersection of Macdonald and San Pablo Avenues, and Point Richmond. There is a connector from the trail to the Macdonald 80 Shopping Center in the North & East neighborhood.

The trail is landscaped with community gardens, native vegetation, daylighted portions of Baxter Creek, and an artificial creek channel used to filter pollution along its frontage.

The western end of the trail connects in Point Richmond with a bikeway through Point Molate and onto the Richmond–San Rafael Bridge. Pedestrian bridges may be added in the future to cross major avenues such as San Pablo Avenue and 23rd Street. An additional side project will add a bike lane/bike trail between the Richmond Greenway and the Ohlone Greenway at Potrero Avenue via 23rd Street, Carlson Boulevard, Cutting Boulevard, and Potrero.

== History ==
Beginning in 1904, the Atchison, Topeka and Santa Fe Railway lines carried freight through the city of Richmond. These transit networks enabled much of Richmond's considerable industrial activity. As a result, the Richmond Greenway was host to numerous "environmental hardships."

During the late 1960s Richmond resident Lillie Mae Jones became a Greenway activist, working to turn the right of way of the former Santa Fe Rail Line. She organized community cleanups, created a garden and an animal farm, and took groups of children to the Greenway to teach them about nature and pollution. Ms. Jones's advocacy "made possible the park we enjoy today."

In 2006, an organization called Friends of the Richmond Greenway started organizing community events, advocating for the trail's expansion and helping with maintenance.

== See also ==
- The Watershed Project
- Rails-to-Trails Conservancy
