= Speakeasy Theaters =

Speakeasy Theaters was an independent movie theater operator. Closed in 2009, they once operated two theaters, the Parkway theater on Park Boulevard in Oakland, California and the Cerrito on San Pablo Avenue in El Cerrito, California. Both theaters showed late first-run movies (films still in release that have gotten cheaper to exhibit) and various special event programs in a casual, living-room-like setting. Due to the serving of beer and wine, attendance at most films was restricted to age 21 and over; weekend matinees and some special events were open to people of all ages.

On March 22, 2009, the Parkway theater went out of business. In 2010, new investors announced the Parkway would reopen, as the New Parkway, at a different location, as a similar venue. It opened at its new location in December 2012.

The Cerrito also closed May 18, 2009, and reopened a few months later under new ownership as the Rialto Cinemas Cerrito.

== Theater Histories ==
Both venues are converted movie theaters with long histories. The 1920s-era Parkway Theater was in disrepair when the Speakeasy Theater took it over in 1996; it had last shown films in 1990. The new owners converted the seating, created the kitchen, and opened their unique offering of "progressive indies, second-run Hollywood flicks, and old classics" together with comfortable seating, food and beverages, including beer and wine. It was California's first "speakeasy" format movie theater. The theater style turned out to be successful, and many movies and events were well attended. The management tried to be responsive to the neighborhood and patron community, and offered special screenings for political, social, and popular events (including screenings of the Super Bowl and the Academy Awards). The "scruffy but beloved" theater operated as a duplex. Although the company eventually foundered due to financial overextension, it had developed "a wildly popular, incredibly unique, highly acclaimed, and financially successful theater in a part of Oakland where many doubters would have said it could never be done."

The art deco style Cerrito Theater, described as "the town's favorite landmark", operated as a theater from 1935 through the 1960s, then was converted into a furniture warehouse. In 2002 a group of locals calling themselves Friends of the Cerrito Theater persuaded the city to purchase the property and restore it, using money from the city's redevelopment agency. The city selected Speakeasy Theaters to develop the site, oversee the renovation, and run the venue, and spent more than $4 million to restore the original features including chandeliers, etched glass, and colorful murals depicting dancing maidens, warriors and Greek gods. A second floor was added to house a second screen, and two cafes were constructed downstairs.

== Format ==
Each of the Speakeasy Theaters offered unconventional seating, including couches and small tables. Each theater was slightly different in size and style of seating offered. Frequent patrons often developed a favorite theater based on seating arrangements, and movies were usually rotated from upstairs to downstairs so patrons could see the film in their preferred theater.

The theaters were notable for selling beer and wine. They also offered restaurant style food including pizza, sandwiches, and other appetizers and entrees, including a selection of vegetarian and vegan foods. Food was ordered at the concession counter on the way in, then brought to the seat/table when it was prepared; patrons received a mildly glow-in-the-dark number to help the staff find them during the movie. Beverages were provided at the time they are ordered.

Both theaters hosted a weekly event called The Baby Brigade, a showing where infants under 1 year of age were welcomed.

== The New Parkway ==
Attempts to reopen the Parkway at its original Park Boulevard location were unsuccessful, but the name and format were transferred to a new location. The New Parkway, also called the Parkway Speakeasy, opened in Oakland in December 2012 at a new location, an old sheet-glass factory on 24th street in the Uptown district. The new owners are a group of 56 investors, many of whom had been loyal patrons of the original Parkway.

== Rialto Cerrito ==
When Speakeasy Theaters went out of business the city, which owns the property, immediately sought new bids to continue to operate the Cerrito theater, arguing that "The Cerrito gave us an identity as a city, an appeal that a lot of people didn't feel was there before." Rialto Cinemas, which operates several other historic theaters in the Bay Area, was chosen over six other bidders. The reopened theater follows a format similar to that of the Speakeasy Theaters, including the eclectic array of movies and the sale of beer and wine, but is "a bit more family oriented."
