= El Sobrante =

El Sobrante can refer to:

- El Sobrante, Contra Costa County, California
  - Rancho El Sobrante, the original land grant for the area
- El Sobrante, Riverside County, California
- John Kiffmeyer, nickname of the original drummer of Green Day

== See also ==
- El Sobrante Hills, a neighborhood in Richmond, California
