= Richmond Annex, Richmond, California =

Neighborhood in Richmond, California, United States

Coordinates: 37.909°N 122.312°W

Richmond Annex or The Annex is a neighborhood in southeastern Richmond, California. It is mostly residential and located between San Pablo Avenue/El Cerrito to the east, San Francisco Bay to the west, Central Avenue/Cerrito Creek/Albany Hill/Albany/Alameda County to the south, and Potrero Avenue/Pullman to the north. Carlson Boulevard is the main thoroughfare through the Annex, connecting downtown Richmond with downtown El Cerrito.

In the segment of San Pablo Avenue that forms the boundary between Richmond and El Cerrito, the buildings on the western side (which are in Richmond Annex) have an El Cerrito postal address and their occupants are sometimes mistakenly described as being in El Cerrito, such as El Cerrito Natural Grocery Company and Down Home Records (formerly Arhoolie Records).

In 1894, after the Emeric v. Alvarado verdict, Theodore Wagner's map identified William Meyer as a landowner in the area. According to a local history written down by Fay Breneman circa 1941, the 350 acres of land now known as the Richmond Annex was owned by William Meyer, an Oakland attorney, and leased/farmed by the Conlon Brothers. When the taxes exceeded the rent, William Meyer sold it in 1912 to E.J. Henderson [of the Richmond Annex Land Company] for in the neighborhood of $300,000. Mr. Henderson made a beautiful subdivision out of it, with tree-lined paved streets and parking strips planted with petunias. The subdivision was annexed by the City of Richmond on September 7, 1926, after a 92–88 vote in favor of joining Richmond over El Cerrito. In recent years, Richmond Annex has been home to the Pacific East Mall. Other features include the Richmond Annex Senior Center, which was a firehouse from 1937–1976, and Huntington Park and playground.

The residents have also rallied successfully for a cell phone tower to not be built, had major input on the Carlson Boulevard Interstate 80 overpass mural, and kept Fairmont Elementary School in neighboring El Cerrito from being closed.
