= East Richmond =

East Richmond may refer to:

- East Richmond, California
- Mira Vista (Richmond View), Richmond, California
- East Richmond railway station, Melbourne
- East Richmond railway station, Sydney
