= Port of Richmond (California) =

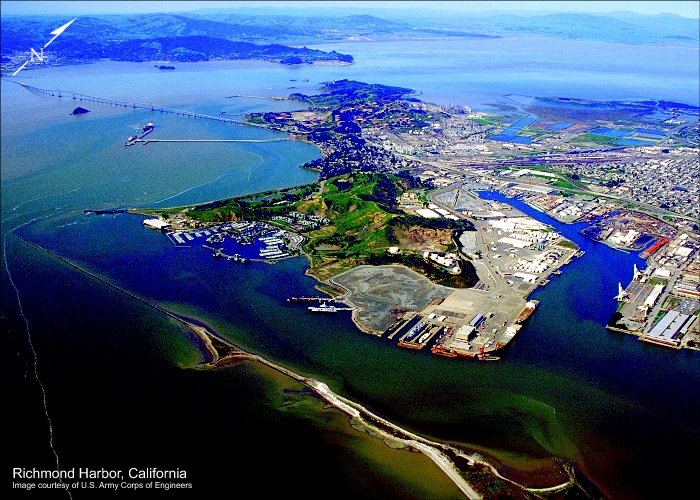
- Port of Richmond
- Interactive map of Port of Richmond

Location
- Country: United States
- Location: Richmond, California
- Coordinates: 37.915°N 122.361°W
- UN/LOCODE: USRCH

Details
- Opened: 1980
- Land area: 200 acres (0.81 km^{2})

Statistics
- Vessel arrivals: (CY )
- Annual cargo tonnage: 21.9 million metric revenue tons (CY 2010)
- Value of cargo: US$ (CY )
- Website www.ci.richmond.ca.us/324/Port-Facilities www.ci.richmond.ca.us/102/Port-Operations

The Port of Richmond is a major shipping terminal in California's San Francisco Bay located in the East Bay city and Oakland suburb of Richmond.

== Operations ==
The harbor is located in Richmond, California along the city's southern coast beside the Richmond Inner Harbor and boasts the third largest volume of tonnage in the state of California annually; a total of 19 million short tons. It ranks number one for ports of San Francisco Bay in vehicles and liquid bulk. In addition to these the port can also handle dry-bulk, break-bulk, and containers. Seven of the terminals are city owned in addition to 5 dry-docks while there are 11 privately owned terminals from whence 90% of tonnage emerge. The port is served by a sophisticated rail network served by four major rail companies. The port itself has been described as a "boondoggle" and as unprofitable, however in 2012 operations finally broke even; furthermore a net profit was projected over the following decade.

== History ==
The port was constructed in the 1980s about thirty years after the World War II-era Kaiser Shipyards were decommissioned.

In 1993 the port received 26 million tons of goods. The majority of the cargo was oil and other petroleum products. The port is located at the end of Canal Boulevard in South Richmond. Port Richmond also receives imported cars and delivers them to dealers throughout the San Francisco Bay Area.

The port is a major entry point for vehicles from Asia. The port signed an $US85 million, 15-year deal in 2010 to import Honda vehicles to the city after spending $37 million on upgrades in infrastructure from warehousing to rail lines. In 2011 the city signed a deal to bring in Subaru vehicles on a five-year, $1 million-a-year deal. The port is currently flirting with Toyota and Chinese auto manufacturers to expand its unmet capacity.

In 2012 controversy arose over a $4 million federal grant to build a new safety and operations center. The port authority itself supported redeveloping a decrepit former headquarters while influential councilmember Tom Butt preferred to refurbish the Riggers Loft building, a historic landmark. The port's suggestion allows for a building closer to the day-to-day operations of the port, however the loft option allows for cultural restoration of a World War II relic in addition to providing an opportunity for using excess space to lease as office space for a profit. Councilmember Corky Boozé opposed the loft option stating that Butt was attempting to micromanage the port's affairs and that $500,000 had already been spent on studying the preferred alternative. Butt countered that the port's preference is a terrible idea and that he would support anything else, even if the Riggers Loft is deemed unfit. The Rigger's Loft building was eventually chosen

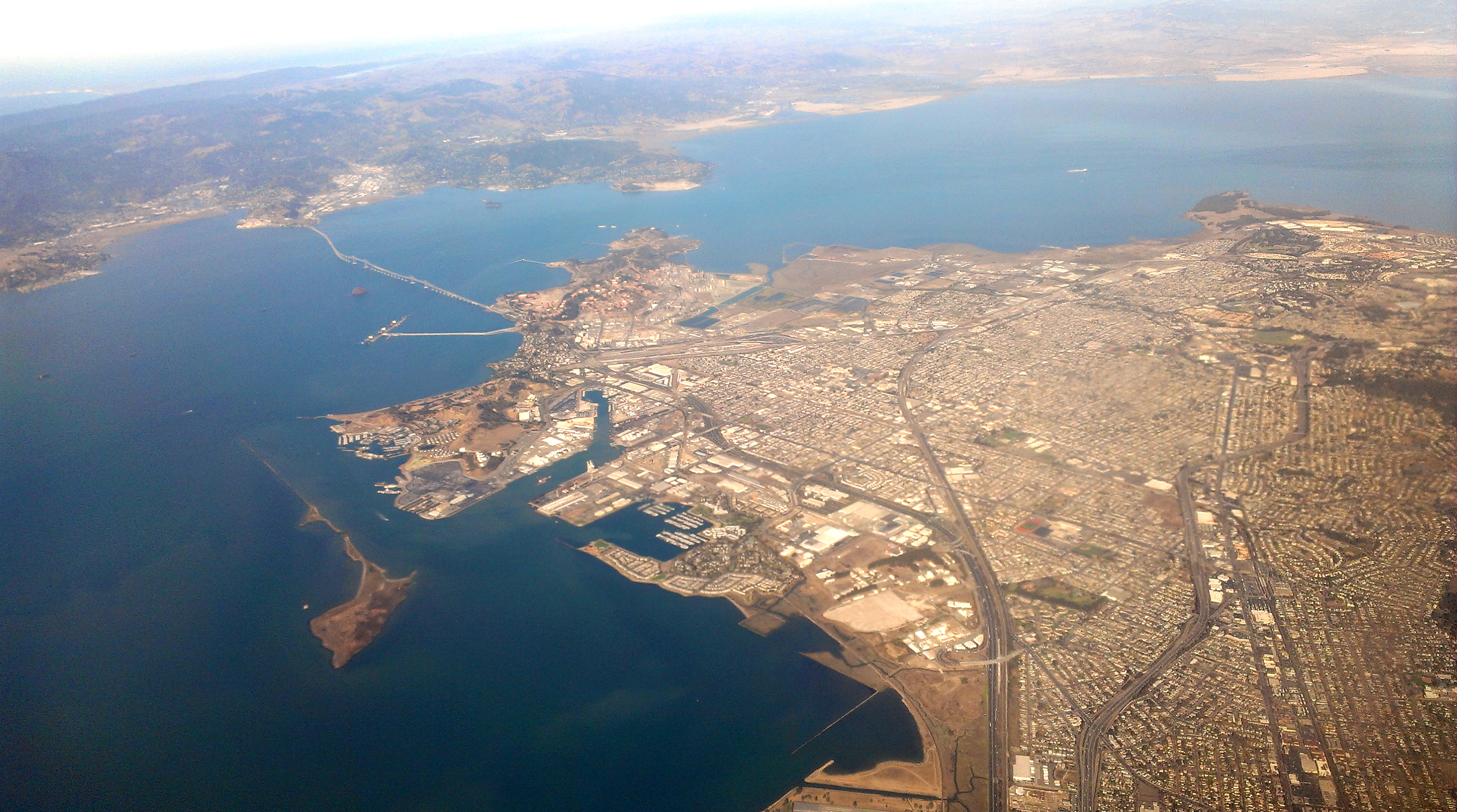
Aerial view of the Richmond Inner Harbour

== Tug Tiger ==
On December 11, 2011, the tug Tiger sank in the Port of Richmond Harbor. The Tiger was a decommissioned former US Navy tug that served during World War II. In 1944, modifications were made to the Tiger in order to hold more oil. Although it is not known how much the tug Tiger could hold, it is estimated that its maximum capacity was about 78,000 gallons of oil. The Tiger was originally brought to the Port of Richmond in order to be cleaned before heading to be scrapped.

=== Oil spill ===
As a result of the tug Tiger sinking, an unknown amount of oil was leaked into the port. The United States Coast Guard was called in, in order to clean up the oil. After the spill approximately 1,450 gallons of an oil-water mixture was collected from the Tiger. There are still continued efforts in order to clean up oil from the Tiger.

In addition to this, another tug, the Lion, parked near the Tiger has an estimated 15,000 gallons of oil-water that have been collected from the vessel. Though it is unknown if there remain issues with Lion, a protective barrier remains around it.

A group of "55 personal from the Coast Guard, the Department of Fish and Games, the National Response Corporation Environmental Services and Global Salvage and Diving were brought in to work on the site."

== Clean Air Action Plan ==
"The goal of the Port of Richmond Clean Air Action Plan (CAAP) is to develop and recommend feasible, cost-effective strategies and programs to reduce air emissions and health risks from operations at the Port of Richmond, while allowing port development to continue bringing revenue and jobs to the City of Richmond" In June 2010 the final draft of the Clean Air Action Plan for the Port of Richmond was published. The aim of this program was to create systems in order to reduce the amount of pollution created by the Port of Richmond, all the while producing minimal negative impacts on the ongoing work in and around the port.

=== Compared to other ports ===
Compared to other ports; Port of Oakland, Port of Long Beach, and Port of Los Angeles; the Port of Richmond releases a fraction of the pollutants of these other ports. The pollutants being measured are ROG, CO, NO_{x}, PM, SO_{2}, and CO_{2}.

=== Honda Port of Entry ===
Approved by the Richmond City Council in October 2008, the Honda Port of Entry Project reintroduced Honda back into the Port of Richmond. As a result of this project coming into fruition it seeks to expand and improve the existing automobile import and processing facilities in the Point Potrero Marine Terminal. New rail services and car-carrying ships are being introduced to increase the import and processing of automobiles. This will reduce the number of unnecessary operations in the transportation of cars such as reduced auto trips, improved locomotives, and reduced wasted time for imports.

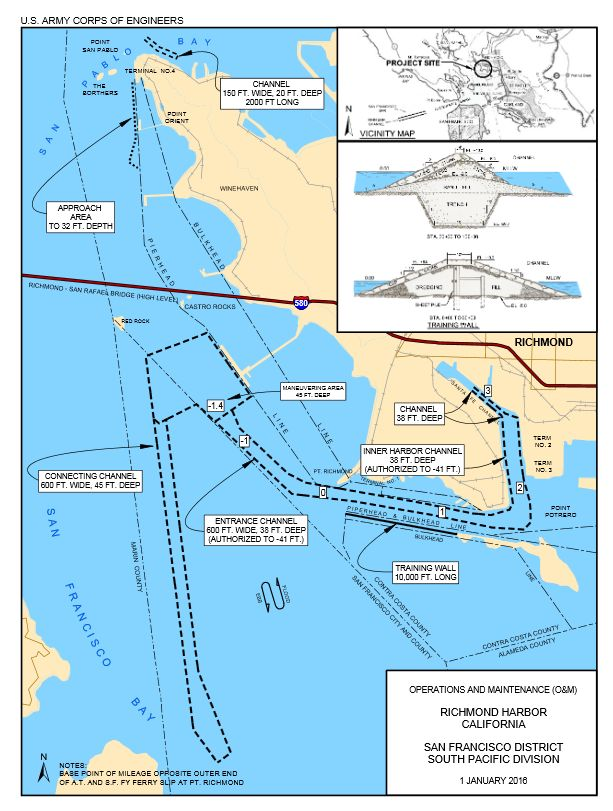
Port of Richmond map

== Port facilities ==
Port of Richmond handles bulk liquid, dry bulk, metals, vehicles, and break-bulk cargo. The port has five city-owned terminals and ten privately owned terminals.

== Shipyard #3 ==
Used during World War II, Shipyard #3 was constructed by Henry J. Kaiser's Firm. This shipyard was constructed as a "permanent shipyard, which is one reason it is still relatively intact."

Today there is a trail that circles the shipyard known "Shipyard #3 Trail", which also share paths with the "Ferry Point Loop". The trail is dotted with seven historical markers that illustrate the shipyard's rich history and role in the development of the Port of Richmond.

According to the Trails of Richmond Action Committee "Shipyard 3 is the only place where WW II ship building facilities remain in the U.S."

The trail is also in view of the S.S. Red Oak Victory and a Whirley Crane. The Whirley Crane was used by the Kaiser Corporations.
