= Neighborhoods in Richmond =

Neighborhoods of Richmond may refer to:

- Neighborhoods of Richmond, Virginia
  - List of neighborhoods in Richmond, Virginia
- List of Richmond, California neighborhoods
