= Humboldt Park =

Humboldt Park may refer to:

- Humboldt Park, Chicago, a neighborhood in Chicago, Illinois, US
  - Humboldt Park (Chicago park), a park adjacent to that neighborhood
- Humboldt Park, a working title for the 2008 film Nothing Like the Holidays
- Humboldt Park, the former name of Martin Luther King, Jr. Park in Buffalo, New York; designed by Frederick Law Olmsted
- Humboldt Park, better known as Richmond Heights, Richmond, California, a park and neighborhood farm site
