= Iron Triangle, Richmond, California =

Neighborhood in Richmond, California, United States

Coordinates: 37.93574°N 122.36002°W

The Iron Triangle, sometimes known as Central Richmond, is a neighborhood in Richmond, California. It is a largely residential area but includes the downtown Richmond business district along Macdonald Avenue. Commercial areas on Cutting Boulevard and near Interstate 580 are also in the neighborhood if the more extensive of two possible definitions of its area is used.

== History ==
=== Nomenclature ===
The neighborhood gets its name from three major railroad tracks which form a rough triangle and define its boundaries. The northeastern side of the Iron Triangle is the Union Pacific Railroad/BART tracks that run beside Carlson Boulevard, Espee Avenue, Portola Avenue, and 13th Street. The Burlington Northern Santa Fe Railway tracks that parallel Richmond Parkway/Garrard Boulevard form the northwest side of the triangle. Normally, the southern side of the triangle is considered to be the now abandoned Santa Fe tracks that ran between Ohio and Chanslor Avenues and are currently being developed as the Richmond Greenway. Because those tracks have been removed, the southern boundary of the neighborhood is now occasionally considered to be the BNSF tracks that run just south of Interstate 580.

=== Demographics ===
The area is well known as the heart of Richmond's African-American community. It has a population of 19,807 and is roughly 66% African-American.

The Latino community has been growing in the Iron Triangle since the late 1980s, making up about 34 percent of Iron Triangle's population. The first Mexican community in Richmond started in the lower part of the Iron Triangle at the bottom of Macdonald Ave below 5th St and at A St and B St in the 1920s. Atchison, Topeka and Santa Fe Railway began bringing Mexican workers to work in the Santa Fe Rail Yard in Richmond. The Railroad also built a Housing Project for Mexican railroad workers called Section housing which was located on Macdonald Avenue and Gerrard Blvd. A small Mexican community started to form at the bottom of Macdonald Ave that grew during World War II, especially by Mexican-American shipyard workers who came from the Southwestern United States. There were several Mexican-owned businesses in the Iron Triangle during that war era: La Perla, Richmond's first Mexican grocery store; Gonzales Mexican Restaurant; and The Rio Theater which showed Mexican movies.

=== Reputation ===
The Iron Triangle is also known as a high-crime area and has become known as a 'warzone' in neighboring cities. (In fact, its name reflects that of the Iron Triangle of the Vietnam war era.) Residents are attempting to reverse this image in a number of ways. One of these is the new East Bay Center for the Performing Arts (completed in 2011) at MacDonald and 11th St, which contains the aptly-named Iron Triangle Theater.

=== Lillie May Jones ===
Lillie May Jones was an Iron Triangle resident and long time activist in the neighborhood. She advocated for the creation of the Richmond Greenway rails to trails project, community gardens, environmental education, and flower planting.
