= Cerrito Theater =

Historic movie theater in California, U.S.

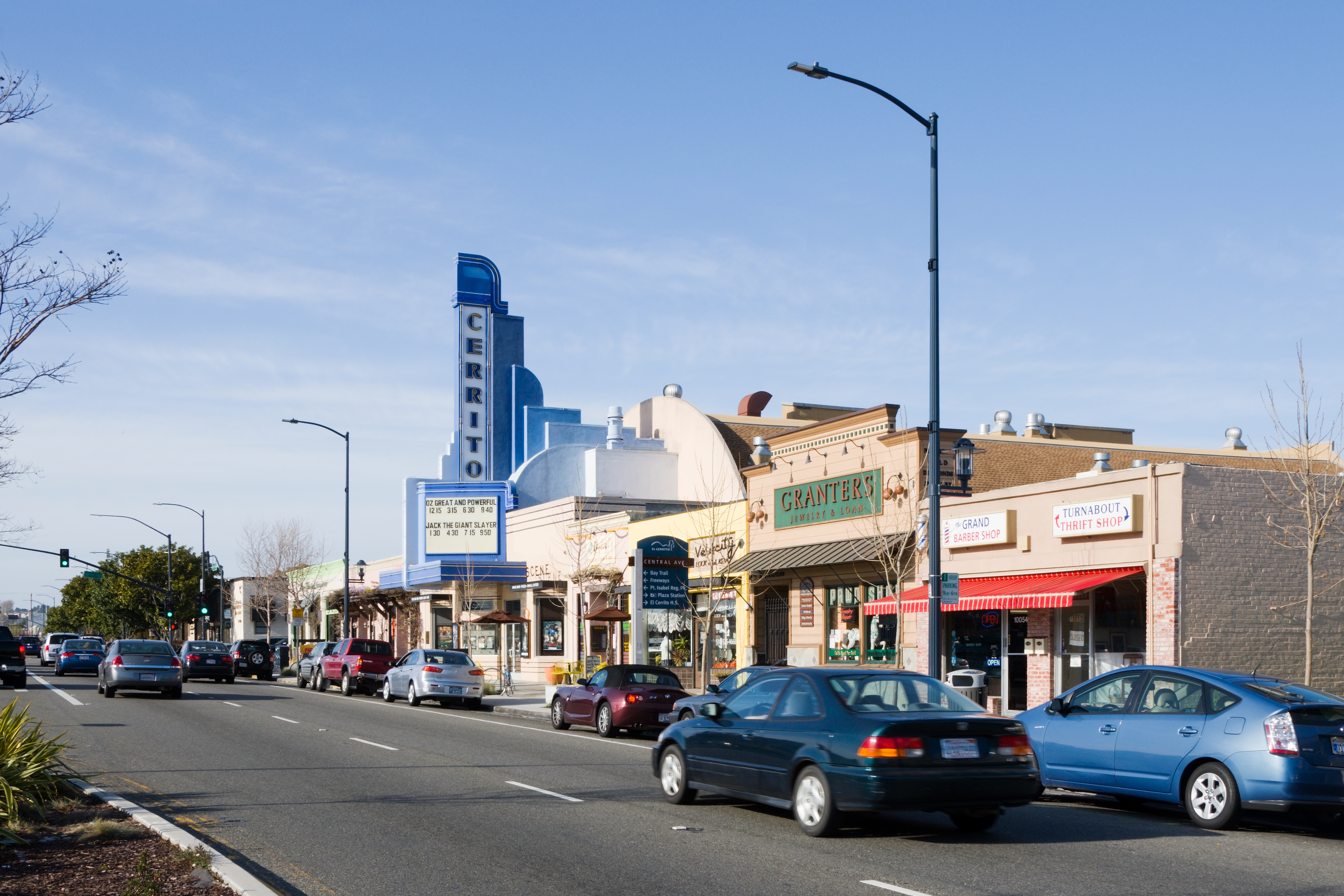
- The Cerrito Theater, as seen from San Pablo Avenue
- Alternative names: The Cerrito

General information
- Type: Movie theater
- Architectural style: Art Deco
- Address: 10070 San Pablo Avenue, El Cerrito, California
- Coordinates: 37.90189°N 122.30286°W
- Opened: 1937
- Renovated: 2002-2006
- Owner: Rialto Cinemas

Design and construction
- Architect(s): William B. David

The Cerrito Theater (colloquially known as The Cerrito, and currently operating as Rialto Cinemas Cerrito) is a historic movie theater located in El Cerrito, California. The theater hosts a mixture of first-run films, old classics, B movies, film festivals, telecasts, and community fundraisers. It is notable for its nontraditional format, offering beer, wine, and an array of food, in a casual, living-room-like setting. Since reopening in 2006, it has become an important landmark for the El Cerrito community.

== History ==
The theater first opened on Christmas Day 1937, with a showing of Thin Ice. With 644 seats and a single screen, it was typical of the theaters appearing across the United States at the time. During its early years, the Cerrito Theater participated in Dish Night, a common practice at the time, giving away plates and bowls to young women in attendance on Tuesday evenings.

Operations continued at the theater until the early 1960s, when Kiefer's Furniture, a nearby furniture store, acquired the building and converted it into a warehouse. Kiefer's Furniture eventually went out of business in 2001, selling the theater. The new owner announced an intention to renovate the space along with surrounding buildings, and to dispose of the theater's original Art Deco interior, which had largely survived the years as a warehouse. Community interest in maintaining the building in its original state grew quickly, prompting the creation of the Friends of the Cerrito Theater, a community organization dedicated to the preservation of the theater. In response, the City of El Cerrito took out a 3-month lease on the building in 2002, during which it conducted a study to determine the cost of reopening the venue. The city also held an open house during its lease, at which over 3,000 people visited the theater in a single day. The City of El Cerrito purchased the property later that year for $500,000 and selected Speakeasy Theaters as the future operator. Between 2002 and 2006, the venue was renovated, restoring the chandeliers, etched glass, fixtures, and murals; a new marquee was built, along with a second screen on an upper level, and two cafes. The original theater seats had been removed when the building was converted to a warehouse; 287 new seats were installed, using couches, stuffed chairs, and small tables in place of traditional theater seating. To fund these renovations, the City of El Cerrito loaned Speakeasy Theaters $2.47 million, and supplied $2.88 million directly to contractors. Speakeasy Theaters supplied some of its own funding, in addition to donations from individual citizens and local businesses. The California Preservation Society would later give a Design Award for the restoration work.

On November 1, 2006, the Cerrito Theater reopened to the public, showing Casablanca. Speakeasy Theaters continued operations until May 2009, when the Cerrito Theater was closed yet again, due to a lack of profitability. The potential reasons for the closure are numerous, but may have included the 2008 financial crisis, mismanagement and poor record keeping on the part of Speakeasy Theaters, and the large financial burden placed on Speakeasy Theaters by its contract with the city. In the following months, the owners of Speakeasy Theaters would attempt to claim ownership of the improvements made to the Cerrito Theater, threatening to sue the city for several million dollars. The city viewed the claim as meritless and threatened to countersue for months-worth of unpaid rent and loan repayments.

The City of El Cerrito selected Rialto Cinemas as the new operator, reopening the theater on July 15, 2009 to a sold-out audience watching Harry Potter and the Half-Blood Prince. Due to changes made by the State of California, the city lost the ability to own the Cerrito Theater, selling it to Rialto in 2018 for $790,000. The sale agreement stipulated that Rialto maintain the historic aspects of the Cerrito Theater, while operating it as a cinema or performance space for 99 years.

== Artwork ==
The theater's auditoria contain murals depicting dancing warriors, maidens, and harlequins, alongside Zeus and his thunderbolts.
