= Henry Cutting =

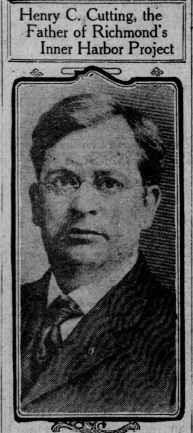
Henry Cutting, pictured in a 1912 newspaper profile

Henry Colman 'H.C.' Cutting (April 3, 1870 – October 18, 1932) was a California entrepreneur, engineer, school official and amateur economist. Initially attaining a mining degree in Nevada and serving several years as superintendent of the state's schools, he moved in 1903 to San Francisco, where he launched a mining company. In 1904, Cutting developed the inner harbor of Richmond, California, into a major commercial venture. He was able to secure federal appropriations for the harbor in 1914. Cutting spent his last decades focused on questions of monetary economics. He advocated various reforms, including the end of the gold standard and regulation of financial institutions. His 1921 book, The Strangle-Hold received wide attention and the author Upton Sinclair referred to it as "the best book extant for an understanding of our banking system". Cutting ran unsuccessfully for the Republican nomination to represent Alameda county in Congress in 1922. Cutting Boulevard is a major thoroughfare in Richmond named after him.

== Life ==
Henry Cutting was born in Iowa on April 3, 1870, to George and Jean Cutting. He graduated from Nevada University in 1894, as a member of its first graduating class. He was elected state superintendent of schools of Nevada in 1894. In 1903, Cutting moved to San Francisco, where he organized the San Francisco and Tenepah Mining Exchange. Upon his first visit to Richmond, then a small town in the east bay, he fixed upon the potential of its harbor, which he believed could "make a big city". In 1904, he founded the Port Richmond Canal and Land Company, of which he was the president for several decades, for the purpose of developing the harbor. This company played an important role in the Richmond economy, up to that point dominated by Standard Oil. Cutting won federal appropriations for it in 1914. By 1922 he was living in Oakland and launched an unsuccessful bid for the Republican nomination for congress in that district.

Cutting favored unification of all the cities on the San Francisco Bay, under the name San Francisco, and publicly advocated this goal.

== Economic advocacy ==
In 1932, Cutting professed that he had devoted "twenty years of study" to economic thought. In 1921 he published The Strangle-Hold, his major work on the subject. Primarily an attack on the gold standard as "a Straight-jacket on Industry, the Strangle Hold on Progress and a Killer of Prosperity", the book advocated a system of public credit and the regulation of banks as "public utilities" which would nonetheless remain in private hands. Cutting's work was praised by Upton Sinclair as "The Uncle Tom's Cabin of finance". Sinclair also declared the work "the best book extant for an understanding of our banking system". Cutting believed that the bank failures, deflation and the long duration of the Great Depression beginning in 1929 vindicated his criticisms of the banking system and gold standard.

== Reception ==
Like the amateur economist Henry George forty years earlier, also from the San Francisco area, Cutting received a chilly reception from academic economists, as his lack of credentials prevented him from attaining standing with the profession. Despite the similarity of his argument to the views of more famous economists of the nineteen-twenties and -thirties such as Irving Fisher, Ralph Hawtrey, Gustav Cassel and John Maynard Keynes, he received little notice or credit. The Glass-Steagall Act of 1933 instigated a number of reforms similar to those that Cutting had proposed, though it is unclear whether his work had any influence on the legislation. Cutting is memorialized by a prominent street in Richmond, California, but he remains an obscure figure. His works have been out of print for many years.

== Works ==
The Strangle-Hold, 1921
Liquified Wealth, 1932
