= Tess Taylor =

American poet

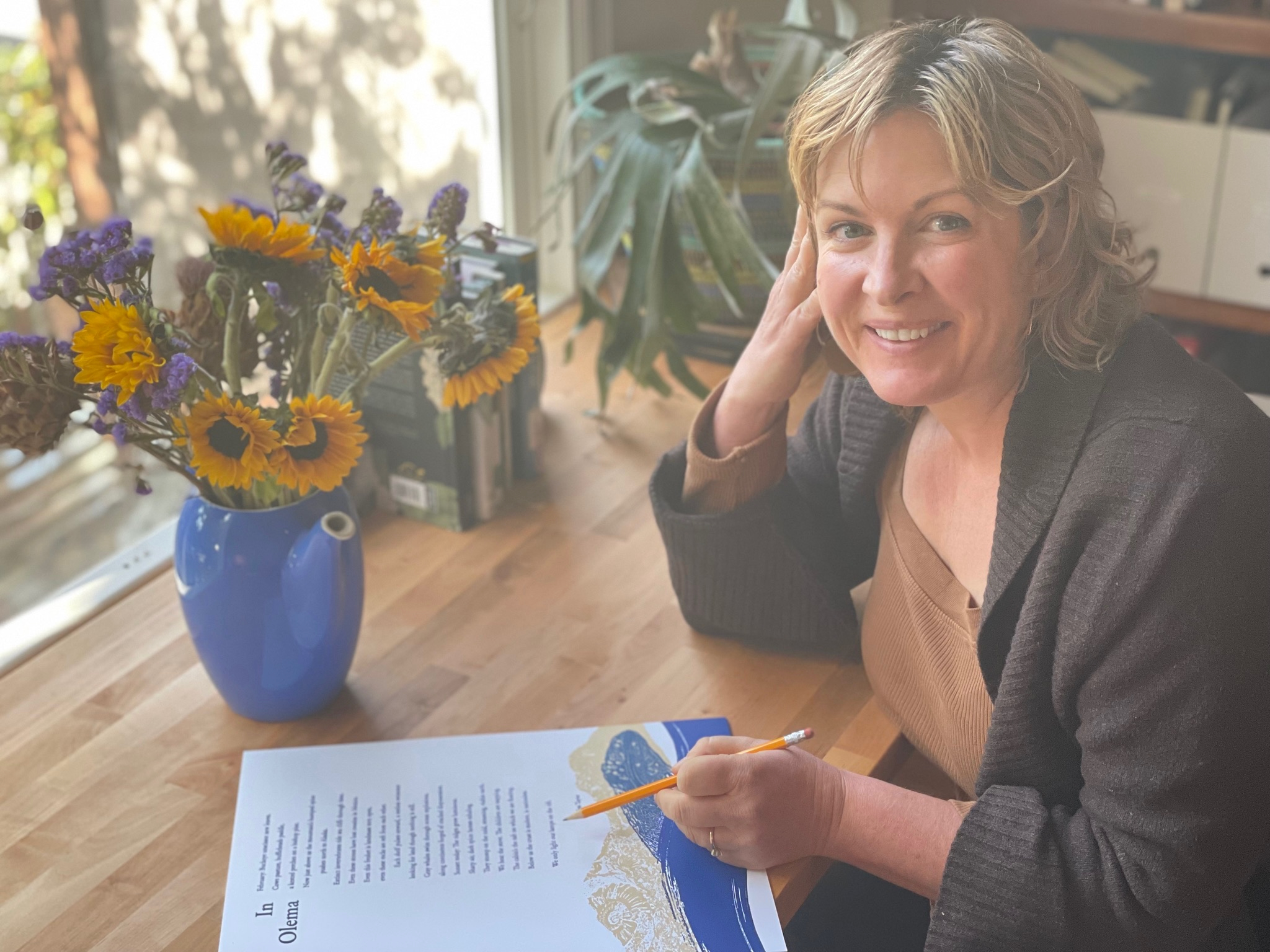
- Born: October 24, 1977 (age 48); El Cerrito, California, U.S.
- Education: Amherst College (BA); New York University (MA); Boston University (MFA)
- Writing career
- Genre: Poetry
- Website: www.tess-taylor.com

Tess Taylor (born October 24, 1977) is an American poet, academic, and a contributor to CNN and NPR.

== Early life and education ==
Taylor was born and raised in El Cerrito, California, and attended Berkeley High School. She earned a Bachelor of Arts degree in English and urban studies from Amherst College, a Master of Arts in journalism from New York University, and a Master of Fine Arts in creative writing and poetry Boston University.

== Career ==
Taylor is the author of a chapbook, five full-length collections of poetry, and one play.

Her chapbook, The Misremembered World, was selected by Eavan Boland for the Poetry Society of America's inaugural chapbook fellowship.

Her first book, The Forage House, was published in 2013 by Red Hen Press. In this book, Taylor, a white descendant of Thomas Jefferson, reckons with this heritage. In gathering materials for this book, Taylor received funding from the American Antiquarian Society and the International Center for Jefferson Studies to conduct research over two summers at Monticello, the primary plantation of Thomas Jefferson. Former Poet laureate of the United States Natasha Trethewey remarked that "The Forage House is a brave and compelling collection that bears witness to the journey of historical discovery. Sifting through archives, artifact, and souvenir, Taylor presents a dialectic of what's recorded and what's not, unearthing the traces that give way to her own history—and a vital link to our shared American past. What's here and accounted for draws us powerfully toward what's absent; what seems complete here never is—something as fragmented as history in the language, as haunted too."

Taylor's second book, Work & Days, features a calendric cycle of 28 poems which chart the work of a year spent interning on a small farm in The Berkshires while on an Amy Clampitt Fellowship in 2010. Work & Days was named one of the best books of poetry of 2016 by The New York Times.

In 2020, Taylor published Last West: Roadsongs for Dorothea Lange and Rift Zone. Last West: Roadsongs for Dorothea Lange was published by the Museum of Modern Art as a part of the Dorothea Lange: Words & Pictures exhibition. Rift Zone, published by Red Hen Press, is a book of poetry that explores fault lines, history, and current crises in Taylor's hometown of El Cerrito, California and across the state. Rift Zone was named as one of the best books of 2020 by The Boston Globe.

In 2024, Taylor edited Leaning Toward Light: Poems for Gardens and the Hands that Tend Them, published by Storey Publishing. The anthology gathers contemporary poems about gardening and the living world for an era of climate crisis.

A staged theatrical adaptation of Last West: Roadsongs for Dorothea Lange premiered a sold-out run at the Sonoma Valley Museum of Art in 2025. and later played at the Oakland Museum of California.

Taylor's sixth poetry collection, Come Bite, is forthcoming from Milkweed Editions in April 2027.

Taylor's writing has been published widely, appearing in magazines and journals such as Poetry, Tin House, The Kenyon Review, Virginia Quarterly Review, The New Yorker, Travel + Leisure, The Atlantic, Harper's Magazine, and many others. She is a frequent contributor to CNN and is the on-air poetry reviewer for NPR's All Things Considered.

In addition to her poetry, Taylor is a nationally recognized critic. She served for ten years as the poetry reviewer for NPR's All Things Considered, and writes editorials and book reviews for CNN and The New York Times. Her poems and nonfiction have appeared in The Atlantic, Boston Review, Harvard Review, Virginia Quarterly Review, The Times Literary Supplement, Travel & Leisure, Harper's Magazine, Tin House, The Kenyon Review, The New Yorker, and other publications. Taylor chaired the poetry committee of the National Book Critics Circle for six years.

Taylor served as Poet Laureate of El Cerrito, California, where she hosted literary events in schools and community centers. In 2024, she was awarded an Academy of American Poets' Laureate Fellowship in recognition of this work.

Taylor has taught literature and writing at University of California, Berkeley, University of California Davis, and St. Mary's College of California, and has served as Visiting Professor at Whittier College and as a Distinguished Fulbright US Scholar at the Seamus Heaney Centre at Queen's University Belfast, where she worked alongside Northern Irish poets Sinead Morrissey, Michael Longley, and Ciaran Carson. She is currently on the faculty of Ashland University's Low-Residency MFA program.

== Personal life ==
Taylor lives and gardens just outside Berkeley, California, with her husband and two children.

== Awards and fellowships ==
- 2003 Poetry Society of America's inaugural chapbook fellowship.
- 2010 Amy Clampitt Fellowship
- 2017 Distinguished Fulbright US Scholar at the Seamus Heaney Centre at Queen's University in Belfast, working alongside Sinead Morrisey, Michael Longley and Ciaran Carson
- Fellowship, MacDowell Colony
- Fellowship, Harvard's Woodberry Poetry Room
- Fellowship, MARBL Archive, Emory University
- Fellowship, Headlands Center for the Arts
- Fellowship, International Center for Jefferson Studies
- Poet Laureate of El Cerrito, California
- 2024 Academy of American Poets' Laureate Fellowship

== Books ==
- The Misremembered World (Poetry Society of America, 2003)
- The Forage House (Red Hen Press, 2013)
- Work & Days (Red Hen Press, 2016)
- Last West: Roadsongs for Dorothea Lange (Museum of Modern Art, 2020)
- Rift Zone (Red Hen Press, 2020)
- Leaning Toward Light: Poems for Gardens and the Hands that Tend Them ed. (Storey Publishing, 2024)
- Come Bite (Milkweed Editions, 2027, forthcoming)
