= Macdonald 80 Shopping Center =

- Location: Richmond, California, United States
- Coordinates: 37.9322°N 122.3288°W
- Num. of stores: 12
- Num. of anchor tenants: 1
- Floor area: 200,000 square feet (19,000 m^{2})
- Floors: 1
- Parking: 2,300 spaces

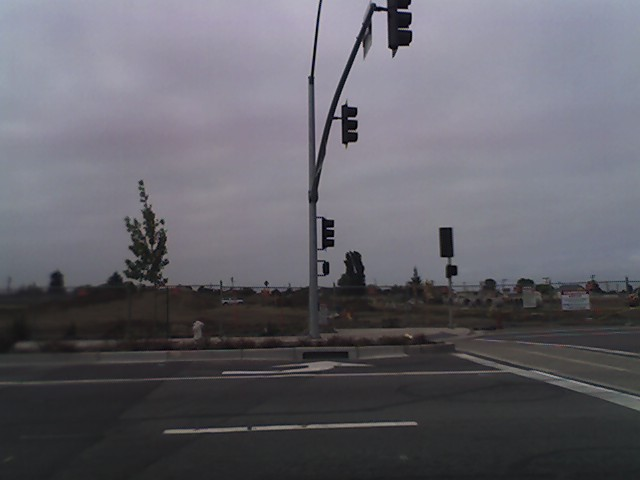
Center under reconstruction.

Macdonald 80 Shopping Center, or Macdonald 80, is a 200,000 sq. ft. (18,580m³) regional shopping mall in the North & East neighborhood in Richmond, California, anchored by a Target store. The center was largely demolished and rebuilt after suffering from urban decay and blight. It is the only entirely LEED certified mall. It is anchored by a large Target store.

== History ==
The mall was built in the 1950s and was originally anchored by a Montgomery Ward department store and a Toys "R" Us toy store. As well as an Imperial Savings bank and a Taco Bell. At the time it was the only modern shopping center in the general area, as Hilltop Mall, Pinole Vista, and Bay Street Emeryville had not yet been built. Imperial Savings closed in the early 1990s. The Toys "R" Us store relocated to Pinole Vista Shopping Center in the 1990s while the Montgomery Ward store went bankrupt company-wide and closed its location in 2001. The site fell into disuse and only supported a Mechanics Bank and some small ma 'n pa local businesses.

In 2004, as part of redevelopment efforts to revitalize the city's "Main Street" - Macdonald Avenue - Richmond began to contemplate the revival of the city center. This was envisioned as a way to ameliorate the budget deficit by acquiring additional sales tax revenue. The city controversially used eminent domain to demolish the entire mall, except the former Toys "R" Us store and Mechanics Bank sites.

A new shopping center was built with modern central parking surrounded by shopping, as opposed to the classical retail architectural model of a centrally located retail structure building. The site is located between Macdonald Avenue, Interstate 80, Bay Area Rapid Transit (BART) tracks and the Richmond-Contra Costa County Health Center.

The city plans to expand the center by demolishing the health center and former toy store building and constructing a Lowe's home improvement store and garden center. The county health center would be relocated to Doctor's Hospital in San Pablo.

A Target Greatlands was originally envisioned; however, it was scaled down to a regular Target due to the state of the economy. Therefore, a nearby Target in El Cerrito that had decayed over the years was relocated to this site. It is both the only LEED certified and only Target with its own built-in police substation.

In 2011 the Richmond Police Department's police activities league held its annual Shop With a Cop event here, and the Target store gave an additional $10 to each child's $100 shopping budget in addition to comping the sales tax.

Payless Shoesource closed its location here in early 2019.

In 2019 two people were shot in the shopping center's parking lot, one victim was in critical condition the other in serious condition. This was the first serious crime committed in the mall since the rebuild.

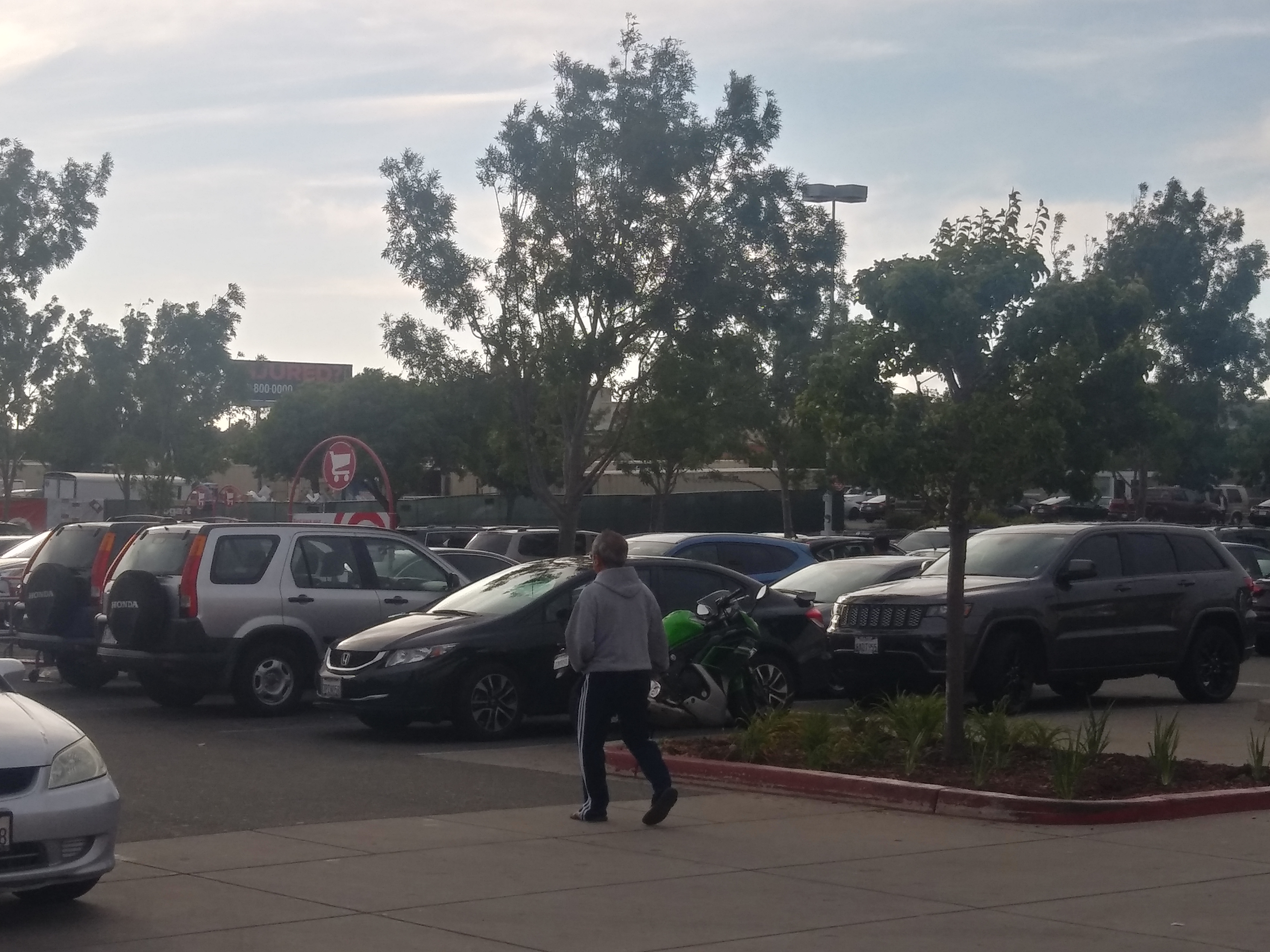
Macdonald 80 shopping center

== Transportation ==
A fork was added to the Richmond Greenway trail to connect with the mall. The mall is accessible by Macdonald Avenue, Interstate 80 and AC Transit bus lines 72M and 800 directly, while routes 7, 72 and the 72R BRT line stop within one block. It is also within walking and biking distance from the del Norte BART station through the Ohlone and Richmond Greenway trails.
