= The Watershed Project =

U.S. environmental nonprofit organization

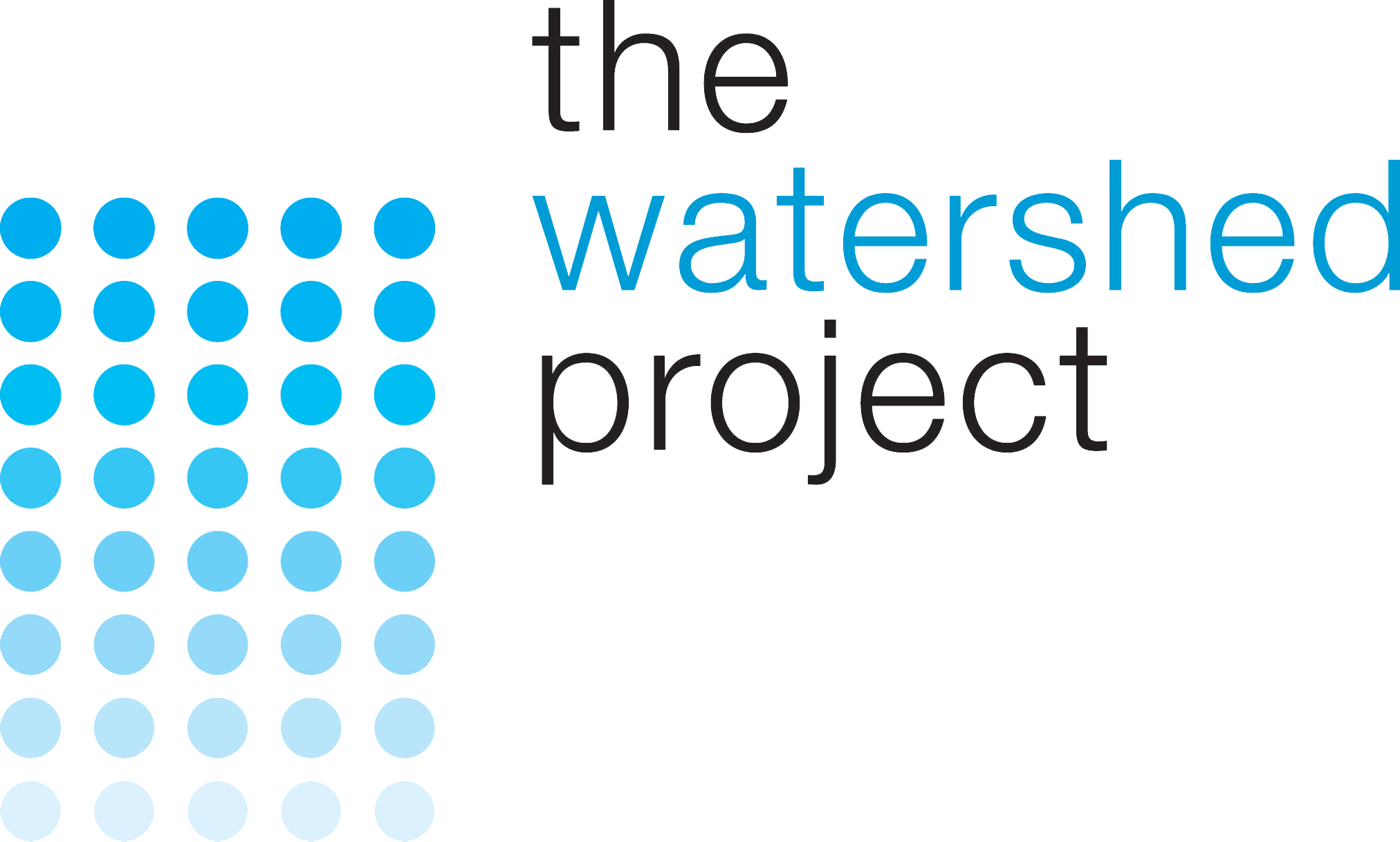
- Founded: 1997
- Type: 501(c)(3)
- Purpose: Environmental conservation and education
- Location: Richmond, California, US
- Region served: San Francisco Bay Area
- Key people: Jane Gire, Board Chair; Juliana Gonzalez, Executive Director
- Budget: $544,708 (in 2015)
- Revenue: Donations, grants
- Website: thewatershedproject.org

The Watershed Project is an environmental nonprofit organization based in the University of California’s Richmond Field Station. Its mission is "to inspire Bay Area communities to understand, appreciate and protect our local watersheds."

== History ==
The Watershed Project started in 1987 as the Education Department of the San Francisco Estuary Institute, a nonprofit devoted to research and monitoring of the San Francisco Bay. The mission then was to educate local residents about the dangers of urban runoff to human health and the environment. In 1997, the Department became its own 501(c)(3): The Aquatic Outreach Institute. In 2004, it changed its name to The Watershed Project. The organization serves the nine-county San Francisco Bay Area in Northern California. The Watershed Project has won awards at local, state and national levels.

== Programs ==
=== Healthy Watersheds ===
Preventing pollution from entering the watershed through education and cleanup events. For several years, The Watershed Project has coordinated Coastal Cleanup Day activities throughout the region and hosted its own trash-removal events.

=== Greening Urban Watersheds ===
This program builds and maintains Low-impact development projects in the Bay Area, including rain gardens and bioswales. In recent years, the program has focused on the Richmond Greenway.

=== Living Shorelines ===
Beginning in 2013, The Watershed Project began community-led efforts to restore and monitor the Bay Area's degraded native oyster habitats. Projects included the installation of artificial reefs at Point Pinole and volunteer monitoring of local oyster reefs. The Watershed Project has partnered to with local oyster bars to publicize these activities and raise funds for the organization.

=== Environmental education ===
The Watershed Project frequently partners with local schools to lead field trips and educate students about their local habitats.

=== Green Careers ===
The Watershed Project employs high school and college interns to assist in its programs and to facilitate careers in environmental planning and education.
