= North & East, Richmond, California =

Coordinates: 37.944°N 122.339°W

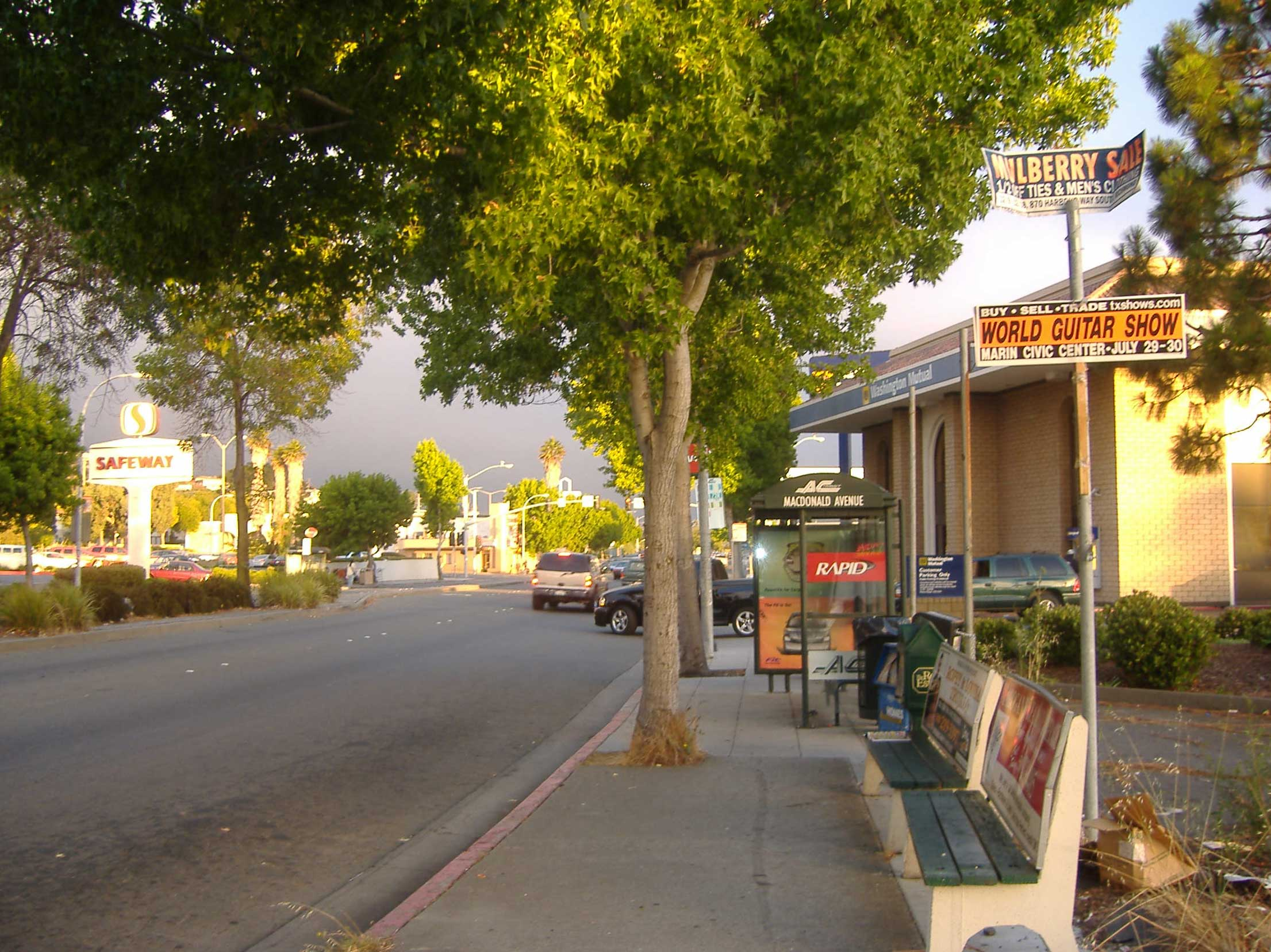
Corner of Macdonald and San Pablo Avenues on the southern end of the sector circa 2007.

North & East is a historic neighborhood in central Richmond, California.

== History ==
=== Geography ===
The district is bounded by 23rd Street to the west, San Pablo Avenue to the east, Macdonald Avenue to the south, and lastly Bush and Moran Avenues to the north. Richmond Heights lies to the east and borders the neighborhood along San Pablo Avenue.

=== Infrastructure ===
Salesian College Preparatory is located on the northern end of the area. The Macdonald 80 Shopping Center is a major shopping area for the community on the southern end; the area around the center features grocery stores, banks, and local small businesses.

The community is governed by the city of Richmond directly and has its own neighborhood council the North & East Neighborhood Council that delegates between the Central Richmond communities residents and businesses with local government. The council is headquartered at the Recreation Center at 3230 Macdonald Avenue.
