= Carriage Hills, Richmond, California =

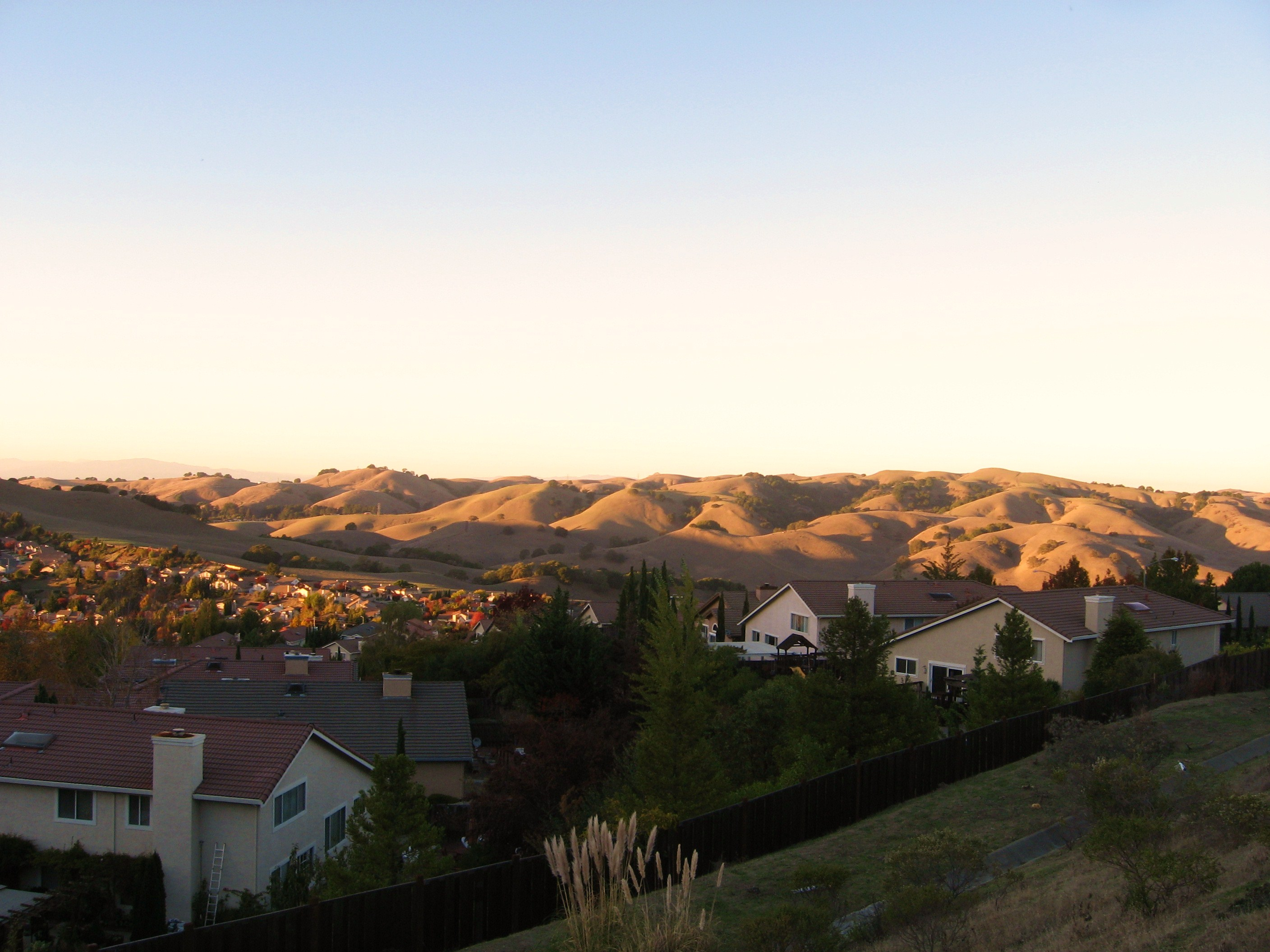
View of Carriage Hills

Carriage Hills, a residential subdivision and the neighborhood is an incorporated integral part of Richmond in the U.S. state of California.

== Overview ==
It is located in an incorporated part of Richmond. However, due to the zip code, most residents claim residency in El Sobrante. This area is serviced by the El Sobrante post office (zip code 94803), while police and waste management services are provided by the city of Richmond. It is a middle class area and features moderately packed tract homes with medium-sized yards.

The Carriage Hills area is on the margin of urban development spawl with a large expanse of undeveloped land, parks and open space immediately surrounding the area, including the Sobrante Ridge Preserve. People may enjoy hiking and wildlife year-round, as well as rolling views of green or yellow grasses on bumpy hills depending on what time of year it is.

== Transportation ==
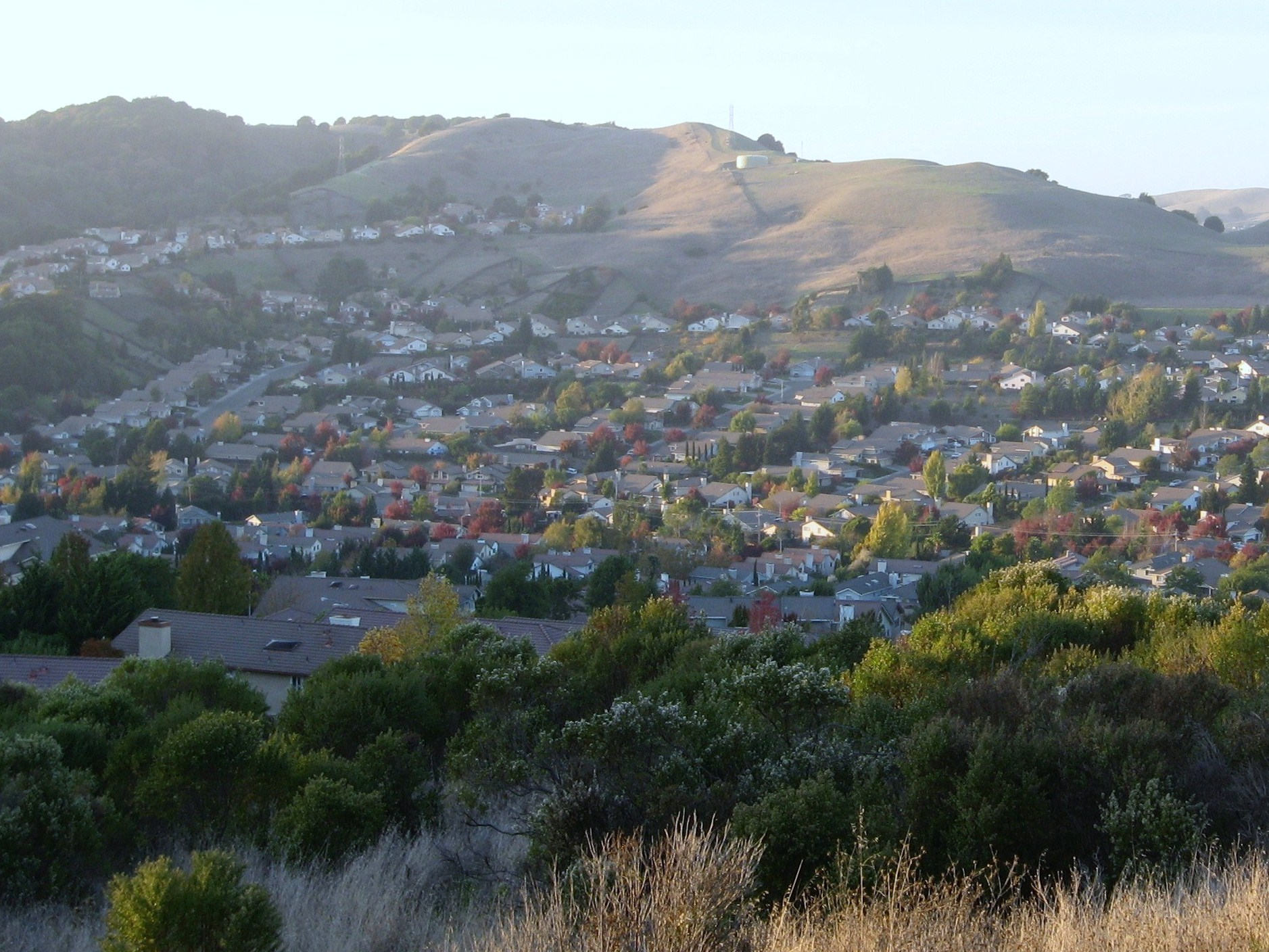
Another view

Castro Ranch Road separates Carriage Hills North and Carriage Hills South. The road runs into Pinole Valley Road to the east and San Pablo Dam Road to the west, both of which lead to Interstate 80.

The neighborhood was formerly served by County Connection bus service, route 950 from Carriage Hills to Orinda BART Station, but this service was eliminated. It was replaced by AC Transit's route 74 23rd Street line, although this line does not directly service Carriage Hills, and requires a 1-mile (1.6 km) walk, it runs from the stop at Castro Ranch Road to the Richmond BART and Amtrak Station. Prior to October 2010, it also ran to the Orinda BART Station, but budget cuts eliminated this vital connection. The only remaining transit service is AC Transit school route 669 that connects those headed to DeAnza High School and Juan Crespí Middle School from the neighborhood once in the morning and twice in the afternoon, during the school year, in both directions.
