= Pullman, Richmond, California =

Neighborhood in Richmond, CA

Coordinates: 37.928°N 122.339°W

Pullman is a neighborhood in Richmond, California. This area was named after the Pullman Company, founded by prolific industrialist George Mortimer Pullman, who in 1910 built the main facility on the 22 acres (89,000 m^{2}) that would someday become this neighborhood. This facility, named The Pullman Shops, served as the main manufacturing and repair facility for the famous Pullman sleeping car ubiquitous throughout the United States for much of the 20th century. During World War II, this facility played an important role in the war effort. The Pullman shop in Richmond was closed on December 31, 1959.

Today, Pullman has been redeveloped primarily into residential units, much like apartments. However, there are a few neighborhood businesses along Carlson and Cutting Boulevard and a railroad is located on the border.

Two Pullman shop buildings are still standing today at 350 Carlson Blvd.
