= Downtown Richmond, Richmond, California =

Coordinates: 37.93767°N 122.35525°W

External image
- Phase I as seen from Macdonald Avenue.

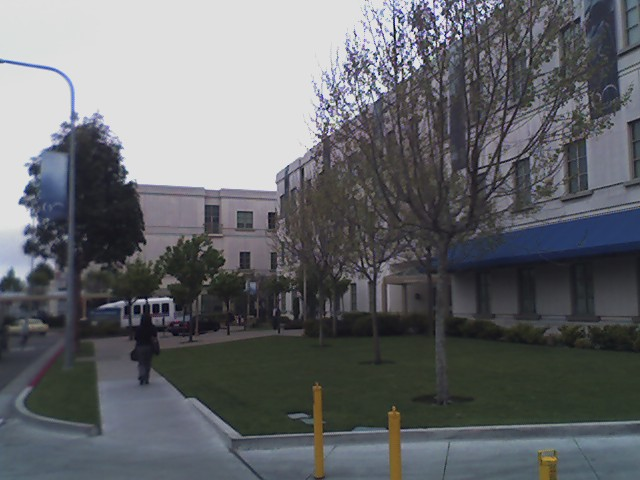
Richmond Medical Center, a major employer in Richmond

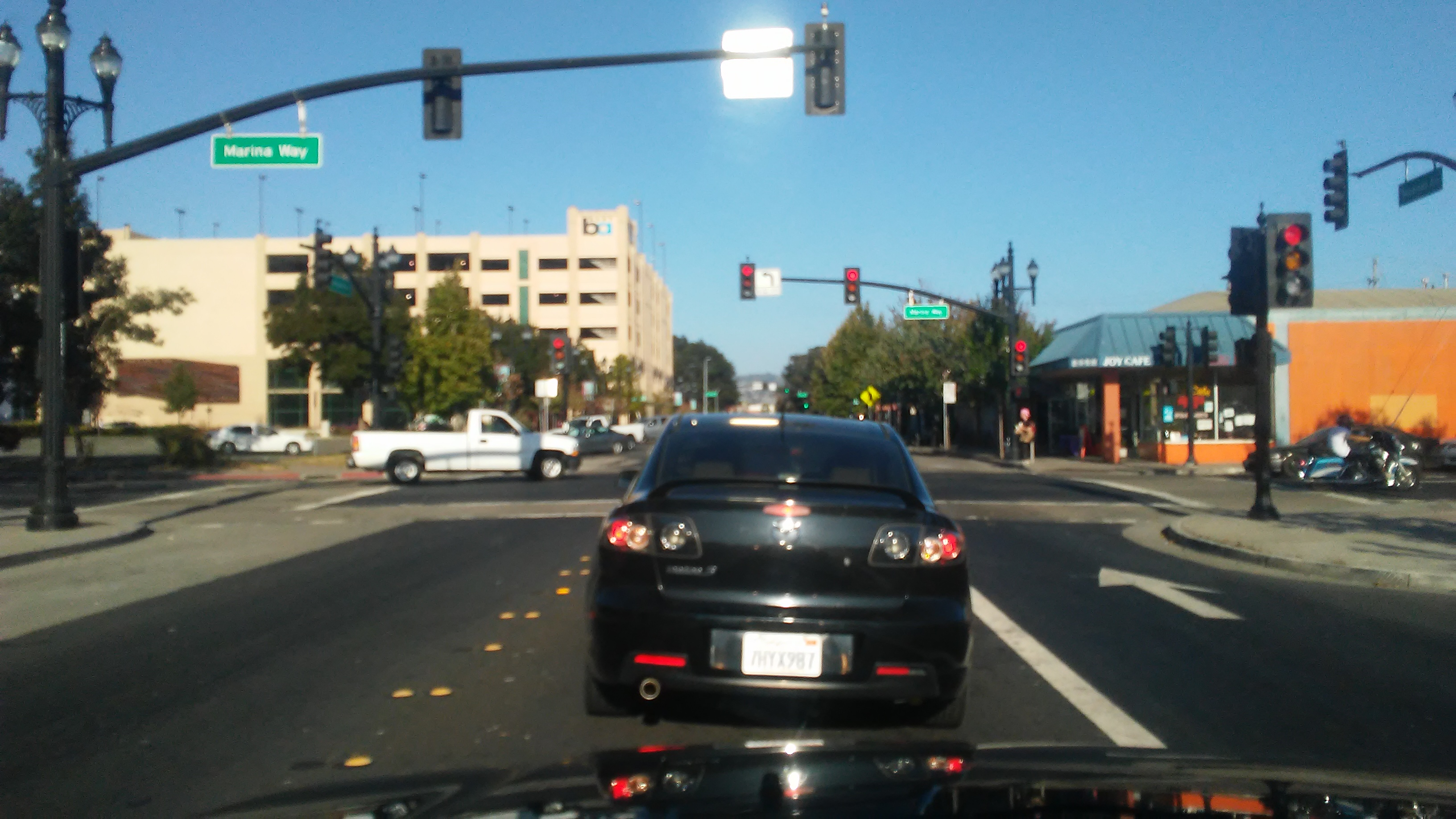
Macdonald Avenue in downtown Richmond California

Downtown Richmond is the old center of Richmond, California. The area is roughly bordered by 6th street to the west, 23rd Street to the east, Barrett Avenue to the north, and Macdonald Avenue to the south. The area once featured major department stores and other chains such as J.C. Penney, Macy's, S. H. Kress & Co., and Sears before Hilltop Mall was built in the 1970s.The area is currently undergoing a revitalization effort by the city, which has included the Richmond Shopping Center anchored by a supermarket. The Richmond Transit Village—coined Metro Walk by the developers, the Olson Company—has also been built, along with remodeling of the Richmond BART and Amtrak station and a bus transit center served by AC Transit and Golden Gate Transit. A Kaiser Permanente hospital and a Social Security Administration processing center provide for a majority of the jobs in the area.

== Metro Walk ==
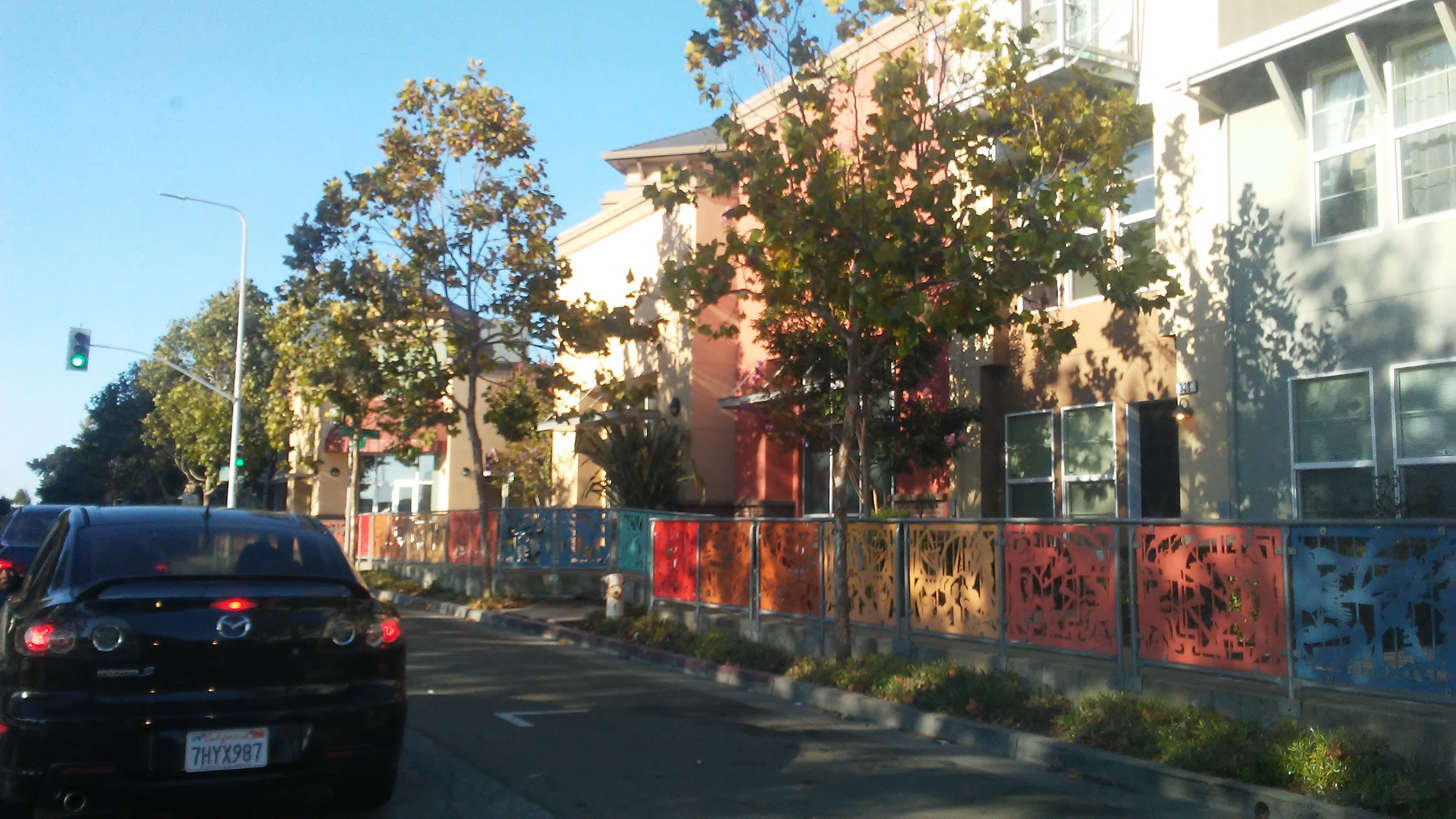
Metro Walk transit village in downtown richmond California

Metro Walk is a transit village in downtown Richmond. a half-built sixteen-acre planned community. The first phase was built on an empty lot and parking lot on the west side of Richmond BART and Amtrak/Capitol Corridor station. This has 132 homes on an eight-acre site with a housing density of 16.5 du/acre.

=== Layout and pricing ===
The floorplans of these cluster homes are from 1,395 to 1,615 ft^{2} (130 to 150 m^{2}). When sales began in 2004 the homes sold from the $300,000 range and up. Three models were built in phase I: bungalows, villas, and career homes. The later come with a ground floor space that can easily be used as a business or live/work space and came with a business license from the city to do so. The monthly community fee was reported as $200 in 2004.

=== Public works project ===
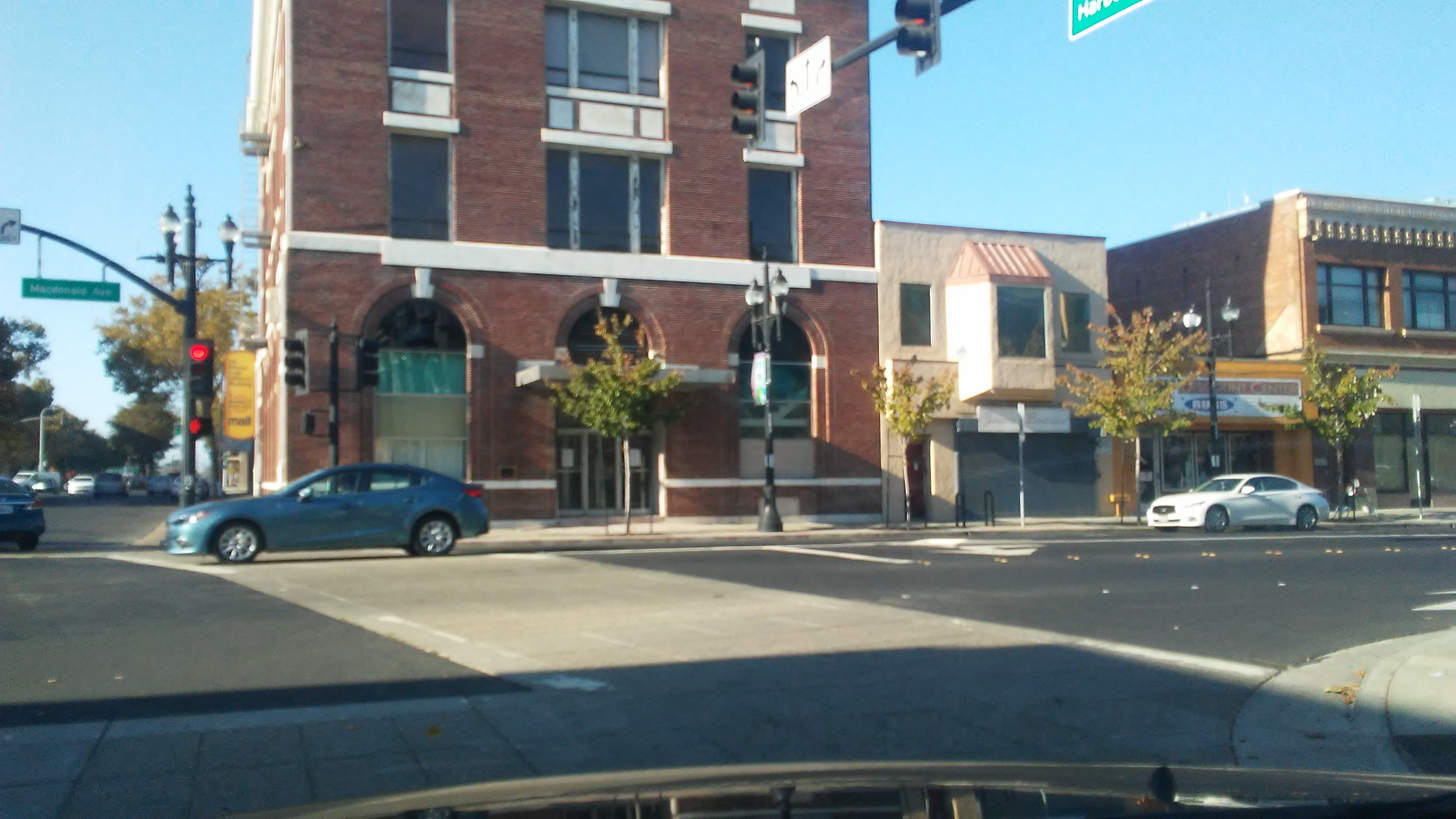
Harbour Way and Macdonald Avenue downtown Richmond California

It has single-family houses as the primary housing units, instead of more traditional condominiums. It was built on the former parking lot and an adjacent vacant parcel of the Richmond BART and Amtrak (Capitol Corridor) station. It is a mixed-use project spearheaded by the Richmond Redevelopment Agency, in partnership with a large consortium of local, state, and federal agencies. Some of the most notable of these agencies include the Metropolitan Transportation Commission, BART, and the Olson Company. The project consists of multi-level row houses, some of which come with a ground floor area with a free business license, in addition to commercial space, a planned parking garage, parks, and a greenway path connecting the station with the downtown area, in particular the Social Security Administration building and Kaiser Hospital. The plan also included the remodeling of the approach to the station which was seen as antagonizingly suspicious and met with apprehension due to the recessed entry which is being presently replaced with a more modern escalator-driven, well-lit entrance with a police substation to provide peace of mind to passers-by.
