= Macdonald Avenue =

Street in Richmond, California

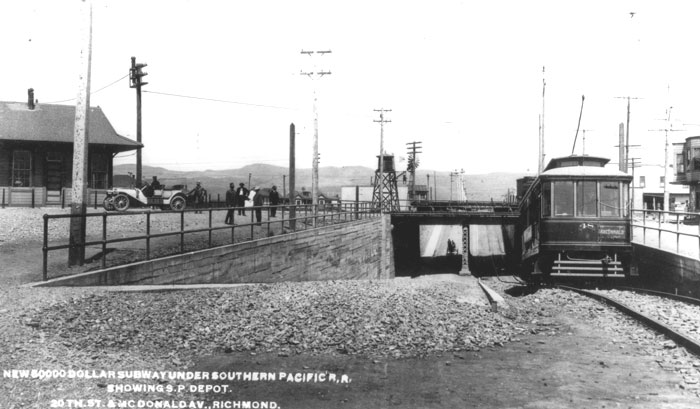
Macdonald Avenue in 1907, an East Shore and Suburban Railway passing through the avenue's underpass of the SPRR tracks.

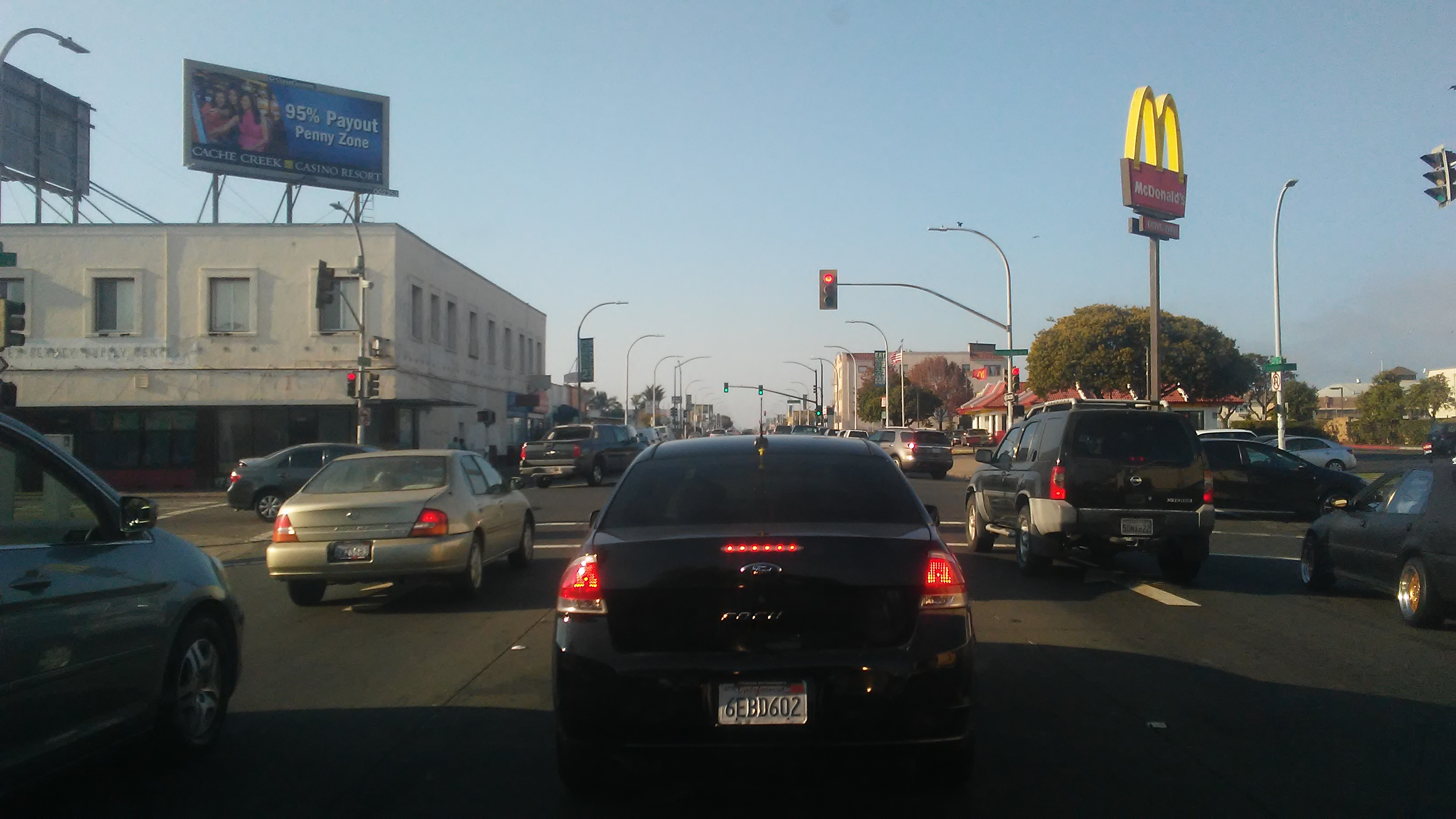
23rd Street and Macdonald Avenue, 2017

Macdonald Avenue is the main east-to-west artery in Richmond, California.

== History ==
Macdonald Avenue runs in a straight line from the Richmond Parkway through downtown to San Pablo Avenue, after which it continues as a minor street for a few blocks, ending at Ludwig Avenue in El Cerrito. The portion from about 8th Street through 16th Street was historically the main commercial area of Richmond.

Bus service is provided along the entire length of the corridor west of San Pablo Avenue on AC Transit route 72M. The avenue fronts the Richmond Civic Center and Macdonald 80 Shopping Centers. BART, Capitol Corridor, and Amtrak share the Richmond BART/Amtrak station along the avenue, the end of the line. The station serves as a transit hub for trains and AC and Golden Gate Transit buses.
