= Richmond Heights, Richmond, California =

Place in Richmond, California, United States of America

Coordinates: 37.9447°N 122.3138°W

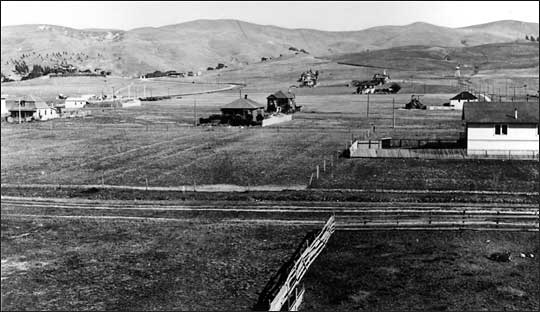
Richmond Heights in 1912.

Richmond Heights, formerly East Richmond and also known as Mira Vista, is a district of eastern Richmond, California, in the San Francisco Bay Area.

== Geography ==
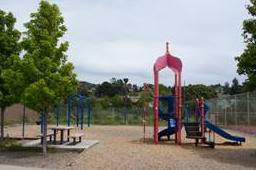
Humboldt Park as seen from the west

The neighborhood is bordered by the North & East neighborhood to the west, the city of San Pablo to the north, the unincorporated community of East Richmond Heights to the east and the city of El Cerrito to the south. The area is also known as Mira Vista (Spanish: Look at the view), an older name for the eastern quarter of the city and unincorporated areas in the sector that is survived by the Mira Vista Post Office across the street in North & East. The portion west of I-80 is referred to as Humboldt Park.

The neighborhood has four small community parks, Mira Vista Park on Mount St, Tiller Park which has a baseball field and tennis courts near Sierra and Ventura, a 0.4 acre (1,618 m^{2}) Humboldt Park and 0.3 acre (1,214 m^{2}) Kern Playlot. Both have play structures and Humboldt also has basketball courts. A brownfield site adjacent to Humboldt Park is being developed by Urban Tilth as a community farm producing locally grown produce.

== Infrastructure ==
=== Government ===
The Mira Vista Post Office provides the community of Richmond Heights with mail services.

The community maintains a neighborhood council that delegates the community's issues with the city council, known as the Richmond Heights Neighborhood Council. The council meets at 6028 Ralston Avenue at the Serra Adult School campus.

The neighborhood is in Richmond Police Department district 3. The entire neighborhood is served by one officer at a time as police beat 7.

=== Education ===
The area's schools are Mira Vista Elementary K-8 school, Riverside elementary school of the West Contra Costa Unified School District. The private Catholic Saint David School is located in the northern corner of the neighborhood and this includes Saint David Catholic Church, part of the Diocese of Oakland. Serra Adult School provides education to adults from throughout the area and is the headquarters for the Richmond Heights Neighborhood Council.

=== Healthcare ===
According to The Richmond Confidential, the city's eastern quarter had the best access to and most affordable healthcare options of any region in Richmond.

== Transportation ==
=== Roads ===
Interstate 80 runs through the middle of the neighborhood and has exits at MacBryde and Solano Avenues. The main street corridor is San Pablo Avenue. MacBryde and Solano are as major arteries feeding Interstate 80 and Arlington Boulevard in East Richmond Heights. Amador and Humboldt are frontage roads to the highway and Yuba, Garvin and others are feeder streets.

The I-80/Hercules bikeway passes through the neighborhood from the El Cerrito border along Humboldt Street to the northern border with the city of San Pablo. The trail connects the El Cerrito del Norte BART station and Ohlone Greenway to the south with the city of Hercules to the north.

=== Public transit ===
AC Transit runs bus services through the community along the San Pablo corridor. This service includes one local, one rapid, one express commuter and two school service lines through the neighborhood. The service has been reduced substantially compared to the 1990s and 2000s, including less frequent service, reduction from four local lines to one and reduction from five express buses to one.

Currently, route 72 provides local service to Contra Costa College and Hilltop Mall and points in Richmond and San Pablo to the north. The line also travels south to El Cerrito del Norte Bay Area Rapid Transit station, a major regional transit hub and then further south into El Cerrito, Berkeley, points in between and finally Oakland. The 72R is a bus rapid transit line that has one rapid stop in Richmond Heights at San Pablo and Garvin that travels from Contra Costa College to Oakland. Line L provides transbay commuter service to or from the San Francisco Transbay Terminal. School lines 683 and 684 connect the community's students with LeVonya DeJean and Portola Middle School and El Cerrito High School.

== Zoning and development ==
The area is mostly residential with detached single family homes with some two-story apartment buildings in between. The majority of the neighborhood is zoned as multifamily residential with areas along Humboldt Street zoned as neighborhood commercial and the San Pablo Avenue corridor and western McBryde Corridor are marked for general commercial. Some small areas are marked community and regional recreational or public and civic uses, such as schools and parks.

There are many small businesses along San Pablo Avenue, including a diverse mix of Indian, Chinese, Vietnamese, Thai, Nicaraguan, Cajun, Mexican, American and fast food restaurants, earning the area a reputation as a low-priced "gourmet ghetto", according to the East Bay Express. There are 30 businesses in the district, mostly small to medium-sized retail shops, in addition to leasing offices for apartments, insurance, banking, grocery and auto dealers.

The city has expanded its business façade improvement project to the area's San Pablo Avenue businesses with US$20,000 grants that need not be paid back if the business remains in place for five years.
