= 23rd Street (Richmond, California) =

Street in California

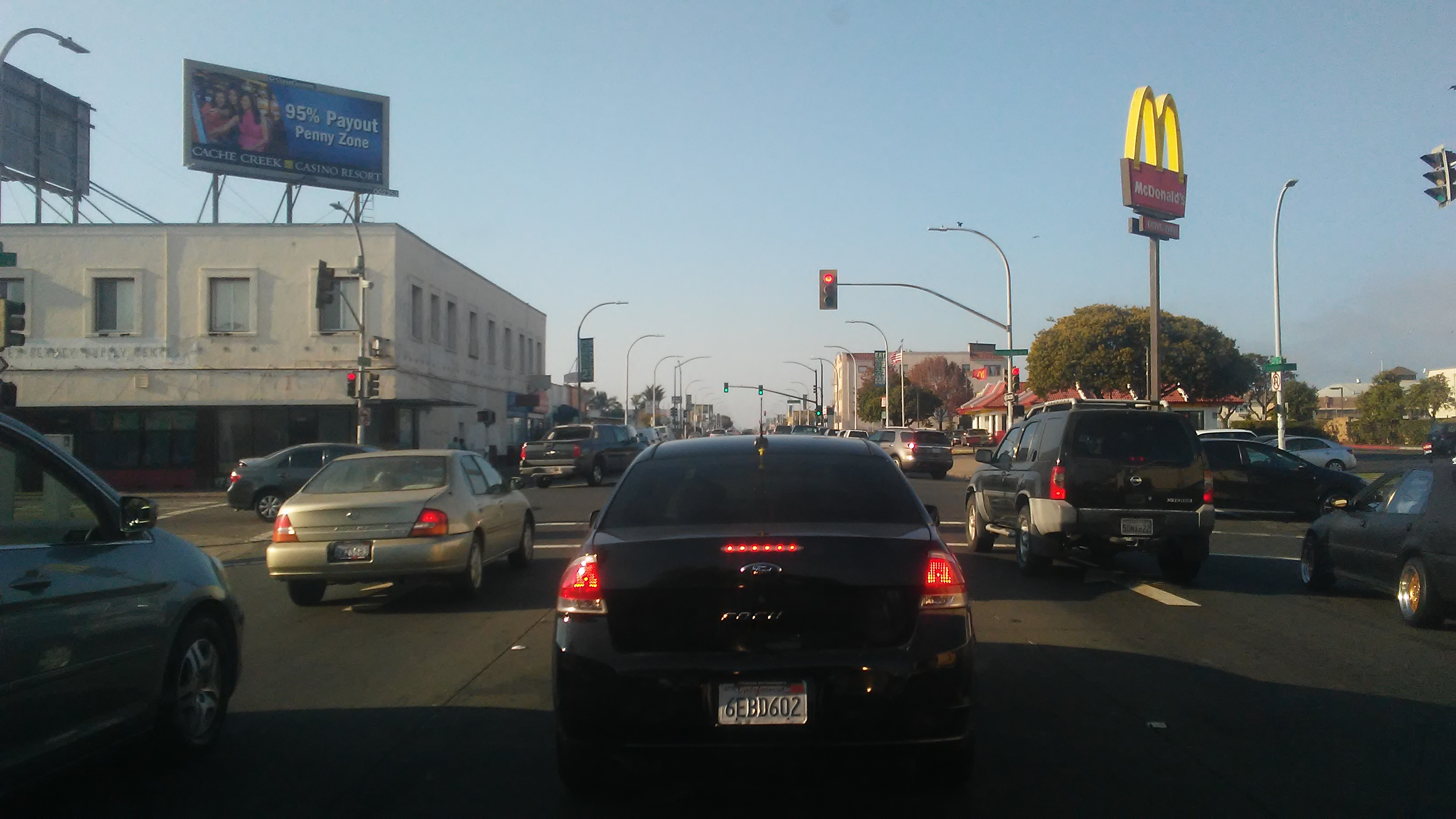
23rd Street and MacDonald Avenue

23rd Street is a major north-south trunk street in Richmond and San Pablo, California flanked by many Latino-oriented businesses.

== History ==
The street runs between San Pablo Avenue in the north and Interstate 580 in the south after which it becomes Marina Bay Parkway. It later meets up with 22nd Street at Grant Avenue. It is currently served by the AC Transit bus line 74 along its entirety and on portions by route 70, 76, 376, and 71 in addition to numerous 600 series school routes.

The street is a major commercial sector for the city of Richmond and has mostly Latino themed and focused stores, particularly restaurants. It hosts a Cinco de Mayo Festival every year, having a parade at Nevin Avenue in Richmond all the way into San Pablo.

On May 1, 2006 most of the storefronts on 23rd Street were closed in observance of the great American boycott known as "Day Without an Immigrant." A protest was staged on 23rd Street with about 25,000 participants.

The city of Richmond has many improvements planned after consulting with the community including adding sharrows for cyclists, wider sidewalks for pedestrians, parallel parking, and wider left turn lanes for vehicles. There are also planned additions of street furniture, pedestrian lighting, trees and landscaping, decorative sidewalks and art, and wayfinding signage.

Since 2006 the 23rd Street Merchants Association has sponsored a Cinco de Mayo festival along the street that now attracts thousands of patrons. The event bans alcohol and is geared toward young people.

Richmond High School is located along this street.

== Major intersections ==
The entire street is in Contra Costa County.

Location	mi	km	Destinations	Notes
Richmond	0.0	0.0	I-580 (John T. Knox Freeway) – El Cerrito, San Rafael	Southern terminus; I-580, exit 10A; roadway continues as Marina Bay Parkway.
San Pablo	2.8	4.5	San Pablo Avenue - El Cerrito, Hercules	Northern terminus; roadway continues as Road 20.
1.000 mi = 1.609 km; 1.000 km = 0.621 mi
