= El Sobrante Hills =

El Sobrante Hills is a bedroom community in the city of Richmond, California. This hilly area, located northeast of the main part of Richmond, was annexed by Richmond in the early 1950s, and was developed into residential housing in the late 1950s and early 1960s. It is bordered by (and often confused with) the unincorporated area of El Sobrante, California to the north. The two main roads are Valley View Road and May Road, and its primary non-residential feature is De Anza High School.

== Trivia ==
- El Sobrante translates to 'the surplus' in Spanish.
