= El Cerrito, California =

City in California, United States

- City
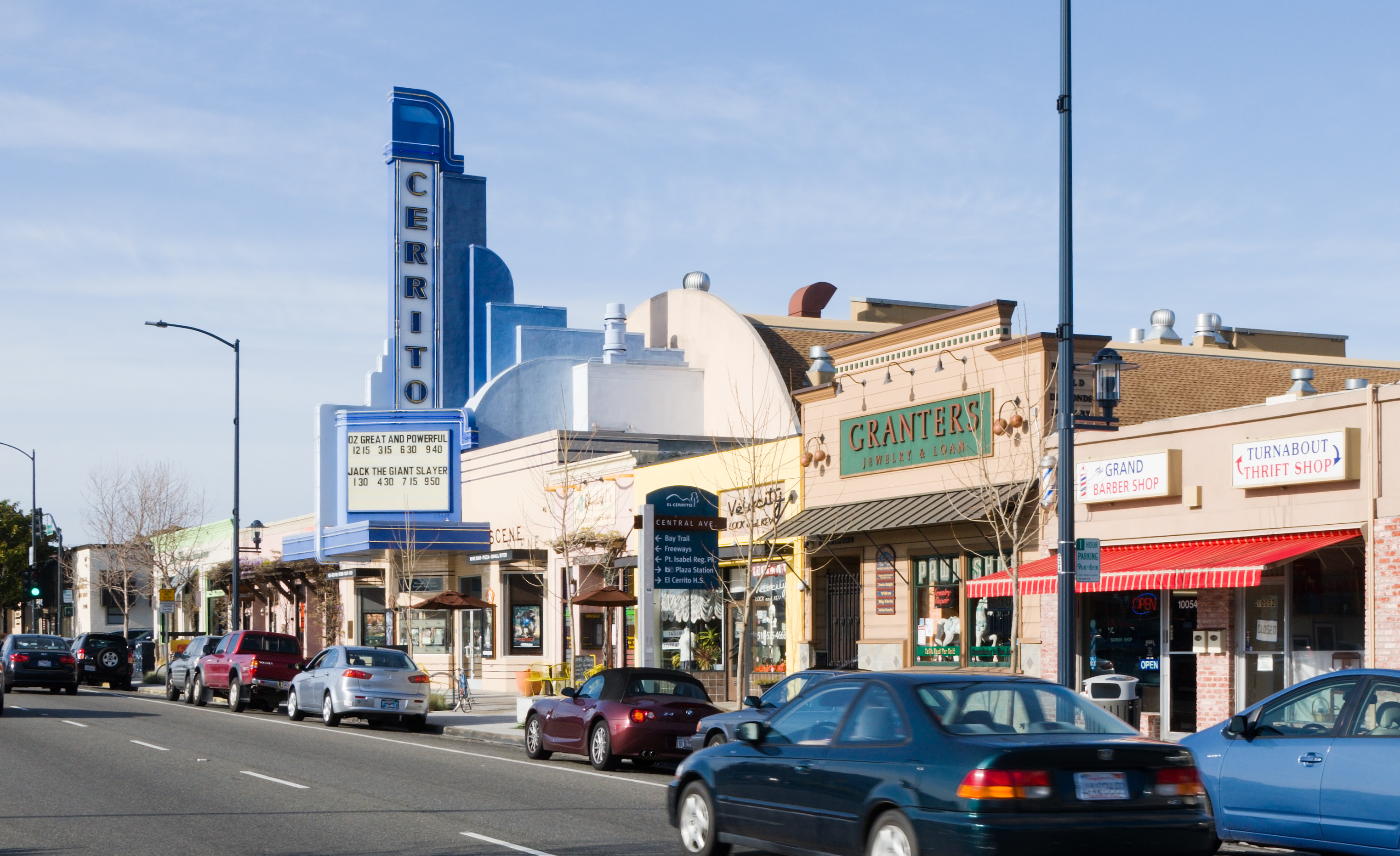
- Cerrito Theater on San Pablo Avenue

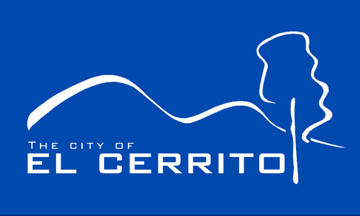
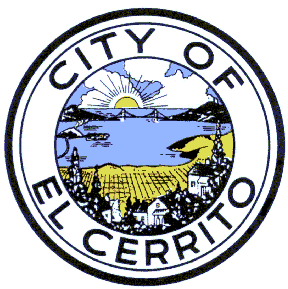
- Flag Seal
- Nickname: Ciudad Del Pecado (English: City of Sin)
- Interactive map of El Cerrito, California
- Location in the United States El Cerrito (California) El Cerrito (San Francisco Bay Area)
- Coordinates: 37°54′57″N 122°18′42″W
- Country: United States
- State: California
- County: Contra Costa
- Incorporated: August 23, 1917

Government
  - Mayor: Gabe Quinto
  - State Senator: Jesse Arreguín (D)
  - State Assembly: Buffy Wicks (D)
  - U. S. Congress: John Garamendi (D)
  - County Board: District 1: John Gioia

Area
  - Total: 3.67 sq mi (9.51 km^{2})
  - Land: 3.67 sq mi (9.51 km^{2})
  - Water: 0 sq mi (0.00 km^{2}) 0%
- Elevation: 69 ft (21 m)

Population (2020)
  - Total: 25,962
  - Density: 7,070/sq mi (2,730/km^{2})
- Time zone: UTC-8 (PST)
  - Summer (DST): UTC-7 (PDT)
- ZIP code: 94530
- Area codes: 510, 341
- FIPS code: 06-21796
- GNIS feature IDs: 277504, 2410410
- Website: elcerrito.gov

El Cerrito (Spanish for 'The Little Hill') is a city in Contra Costa County, California, United States, and forms part of the San Francisco Bay Area. It has a population of 25,962 according to the 2020 census. El Cerrito was founded by refugees from the 1906 San Francisco earthquake. It was incorporated in 1917 as a village with 1,500 residents. As of the census in 2022, there were 25,583 people and 10,637 households in the city.

== History ==
El Cerrito was founded by refugees from the 1906 San Francisco earthquake. They settled in what was then Don Víctor Castro's Rancho San Pablo, adjacent to the ranch owned by the family of Luís María Peralta, the Rancho San Antonio. A post office opened at the settlement in 1909 and the refugee camp became known as Rust, after Wilhelm F. Rust, its first postmaster. The village's residents did not care for the name and changed it to El Cerrito (meaning "little hill" or "knoll") in 1916, in reference to nearby Albany Hill. A year later, El Cerrito was incorporated as a village with 1,500 residents.

El Cerrito was incorporated in August 1917. The communities of Stege Junction, Rust, Schmidtville, and Schindler were all included in the new city. The 1920 census shows that the Schmidtville community had many Italian immigrants. A post office operated at Schmidtville from 1900 to 1901.

== Geography ==
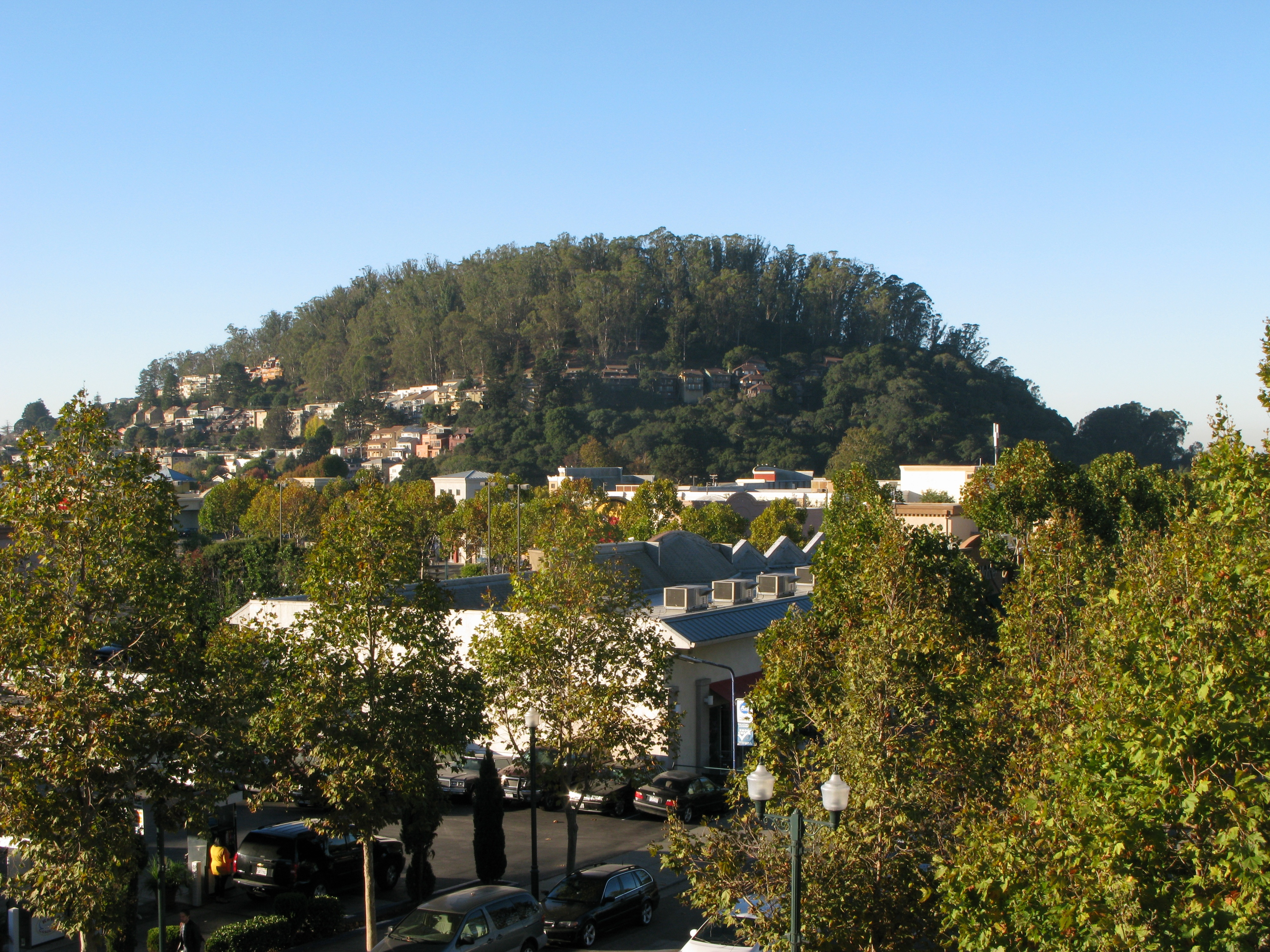
Albany Hill in neighboring Albany, named by Luis María Peralta as "El Cerrito de San Antonio" ("The Little Hill of St. Anthony"), is the namesake of the city.

According to the United States Census Bureau, the city has a total area of 3.7 square miles (9.6 km^{2}), all land. The city ranges in elevation from 20 to 934 feet, with an average elevation of 69 feet (21 m).

El Cerrito is located on the eastern shore of San Francisco Bay in the extreme southwestern corner of Contra Costa County. The hilly areas of El Cerrito provide views of San Francisco and of the Golden Gate Bridge. El Cerrito is located along Interstate 80 and is near Interstate 580. It is bordered by Albany and Kensington to the south, the Richmond annex to the west, East Richmond Heights to the north, and Wildcat Canyon Regional Park to the east.

The namesake of El Cerrito ("the little hill" in Spanish), local landmark Albany Hill, is not located in El Cerrito itself but just across the border in the municipality of Albany. The Hayward Fault runs through El Cerrito. El Cerrito is within 490 feet (150 meters) of Berkeley to the southeast, and is approximately 5 miles (8.0 km) from the University of California Berkeley campus.

== Demographics ==
Historical population
Census	Pop.	Note	%±
1920	1,505		—
1930	3,870		157.1%
1940	6,137		58.6%
1950	18,011		193.5%
1960	25,437		41.2%
1970	25,190		−1.0%
1980	22,731		−9.8%
1990	22,869		0.6%
2000	23,171		1.3%
2010	23,549		1.6%
2020	25,962		10.2%
U.S. Decennial Census

=== 2020 census ===
As of the 2020 census, El Cerrito had a population of 25,962. The population density was 7,070.3 inhabitants per square mile (2,729.9/km^{2}).

El Cerrito city, California – Racial and ethnic composition Note: the US Census treats Hispanic/Latino as an ethnic category. This table excludes Latinos from the racial categories and assigns them to a separate category. Hispanics/Latinos may be of any race.
Race / Ethnicity (NH = Non-Hispanic)	Pop 2000	Pop 2010	Pop 2020	% 2000	% 2010	% 2020
White alone (NH)	12,474	11,364	11,467	54.08%	48.16%	44.17%
Black or African American alone (NH)	1,931	1,773	1,387	8.37%	7.51%	5.34%
Native American or Alaska Native alone (NH)	70	66	25	0.30%	0.28%	0.10%
Asian alone (NH)	5,636	6,389	7,701	24.43%	27.07%	29.66%
Native Hawaiian or Pacific Islander alone (NH)	57	36	51	0.25%	0.15%	0.20%
Mixed race or Multiracial (NH)/Other race alone (NH)	1,165	1,300	2,256	5.05%	5.51%	8.69%
Hispanic or Latino (any race)	1,838	2,621	3,075	7.97%	11.11%	11.85%
Total	23,069	23,598	25,957	100.00%	100.00%	100.00%

The census reported that 99.5% of the population lived in households, 0.4% lived in non-institutionalized group quarters, and 0.1% were institutionalized. 100.0% of residents lived in urban areas, while 0.0% lived in rural areas.

There were 10,483 households, out of which 29.0% included children under the age of 18. Of all households, 50.1% were married-couple households, 6.9% were cohabiting couple households, 26.3% had a female householder with no spouse or partner present, and 16.8% had a male householder with no spouse or partner present. 25.3% of households were one person, and 13.2% were one person aged 65 or older. The average household size was 2.47. There were 6,798 families (64.8% of all households).

The age distribution was 17.9% under the age of 18, 5.8% aged 18 to 24, 29.7% aged 25 to 44, 26.3% aged 45 to 64, and 20.4% who were 65 years of age or older. The median age was 42.6 years. For every 100 females, there were 94.5 males, and for every 100 females age 18 and over there were 90.8 males age 18 and over.

There were 10,996 housing units at an average density of 2,994.6 units per square mile (1,156.2 units/km^{2}), of which 10,483 (95.3%) were occupied. Of the occupied units, 58.4% were owner-occupied and 41.6% were occupied by renters. The homeowner vacancy rate was 0.7% and the rental vacancy rate was 3.2%.

=== Language ===
English was the sole home language of 70.47% of the population; other languages spoken by residents were Spanish (6.26%), Chinese (not specified, 5.96%), Japanese (2.70%), Mandarin (1.80%), Cantonese (1.57%), Persian (1.43%), Tagalog (1.30%), Korean (1.08%), French (0.90%), German (0.83%), Formosan (0.73%), Italian (0.66%), Vietnamese (0.57%), Urdu (0.50%), and 3.23% of people spoke other home languages.

=== 2023 ACS estimates ===
In 2023, the US Census Bureau estimated the median household income was $127,475, and the per capita income was $72,937. About 4.8% of families and 7.5% of the population were below the poverty line.

== Economy ==
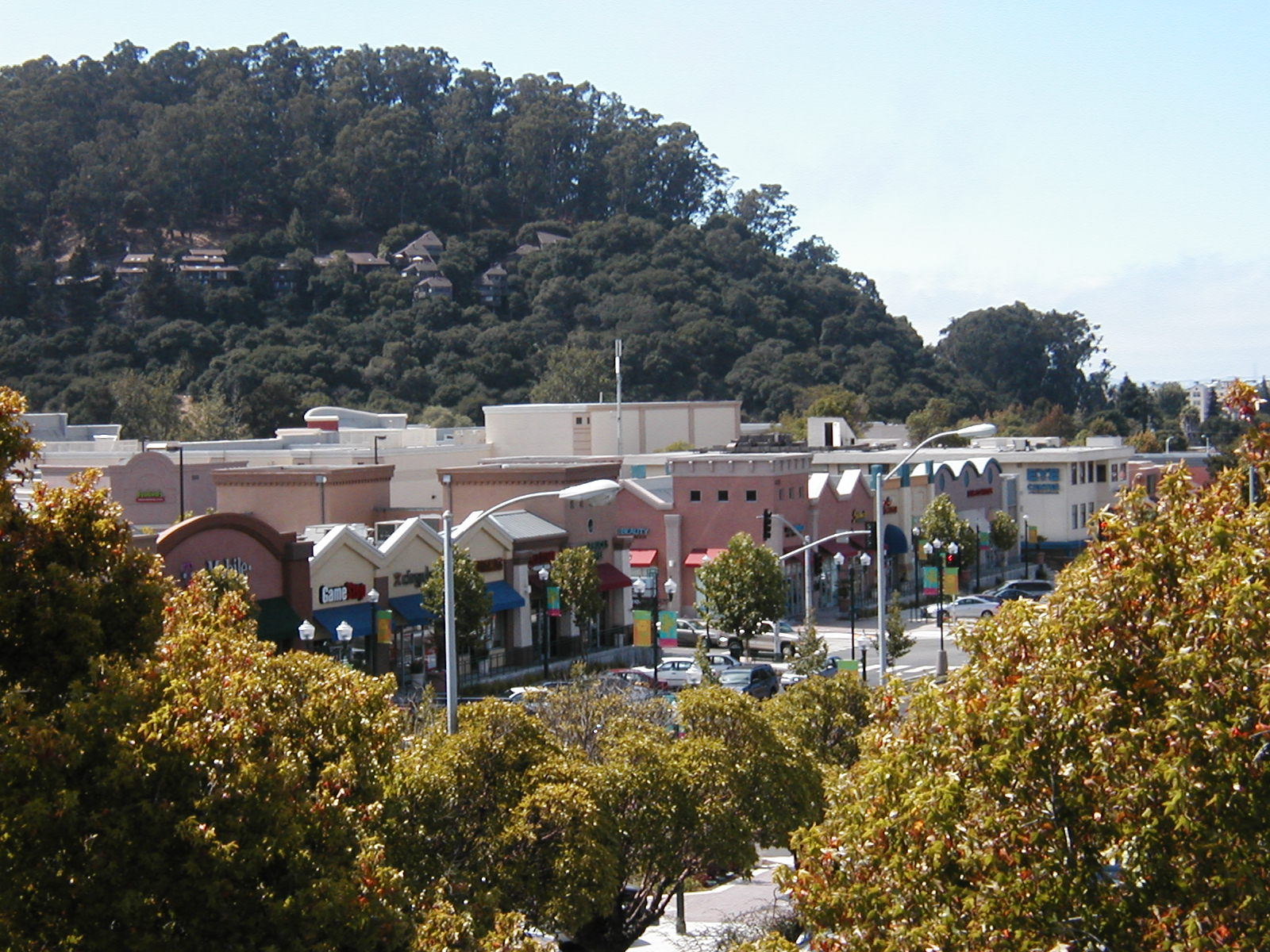
Shops in El Cerrito

San Pablo Avenue stretches the length of El Cerrito and is the primary commercial and retail corridor of the city, though there is a segment in which the businesses on the west side of the avenue are actually in Richmond Annex but have an El Cerrito postal address.

El Cerrito is home to El Cerrito Plaza, a large, regional mall, served by public transit at the adjacent El Cerrito Plaza station. The shopping center is surrounded by other commercial and retail businesses along San Pablo Avenue and Fairmount Avenue, including the Cerrito Theater, a restored two-screen movie theater.

Playland-Not-At-The-Beach, a now-closed amusement park museum, was located here.

As of the last quarter of 2023, the top 25 sales tax producers in El Cerrito are: Barnes & Noble, Chevron, CVS Pharmacy, El Cerrito Honda, Exxon, Harbor Freight Tools, Ifshin Violins, Jack in the Box, JoAnn Fabrics & Crafts, Lucky Supermarket, Marshalls, McDonald’s, Nug, O’Reilly Auto Parts, Pastime Hardware, Pet Food Express, Petco, Petvet Petfood, Ross, Safeway, STIIIZY El Cerrito, T Mobile, Trader Joe’s, Verizon Wireless, and Walgreens.

== Arts and culture ==
There is a branch of the Contra Costa County Library system in El Cerrito.

== Parks and recreation ==
El Cerrito city parks include both recreation/sports parks as well as undeveloped nature areas. Most notable are the 80-acre (320,000 m^{2}) Hillside Natural Area open space, Huber Park (Terrace Drive), Cerrito Vista Park (Moeser Lane and Pomona Avenue), Arlington Park (Arlington Boulevard), Tassajara Park (Tassajara Avenue and Barrett Avenue), Poinsett Park (Poinsett Avenue), and the Canyon Trail Park and Art Center (Gatto Avenue).

The city is home to a 2.6-mile (4.2 km) segment of the Ohlone Greenway (named after the Native American Ohlone people), a trail that runs the length of the City along a former railroad grade underneath the BART right-of-way that is popular with walkers, runners, and bicyclists, as well as the blind, deaf, and mute population.

== Government ==
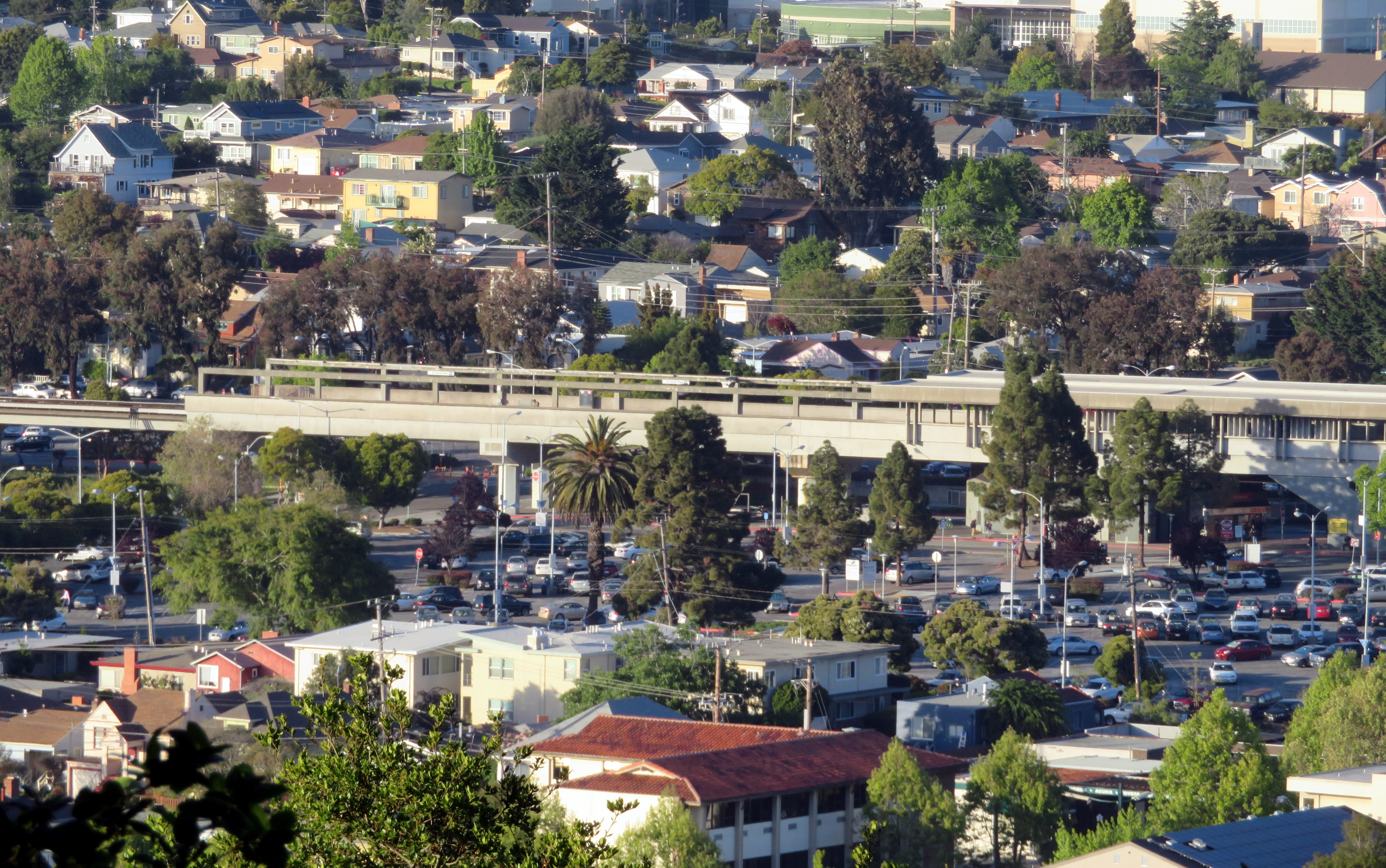
El Cerrito Plaza station, served by Bay Area Rapid Transit

The City of El Cerrito is a Charter City that incorporated as a General Law City on August 23, 1917, and just over one hundred years later became a Charter City. The city is organized as a Council-Manager form of local municipal government, and its City Charter was adopted by the voters in November 2018. The City Council consists of five members elected at large for four-year, overlapping terms. The Council selects the Mayor for a one-year term from among its members. The Mayor and City Council provide community leadership, develop policies to guide the City in delivering services and achieving community goals, and encourage citizen understanding and involvement. The Council Members also serve as the governing body of the El Cerrito Employees’ Pension Board and the El Cerrito Public Financing Authority.

The City provides police and fire services as well as recreation, streets and roads, recycling, economic development, public improvements, building, planning and zoning, and general administrative services. Residents are provided water by East Bay Municipal Utility District and sewer services through Stege Sanitary District. PG&E provides gas and electricity services, and in addition the city is a member of MCE, a public, not-for-profit electricity provider that gives all PG&E electric customers the choice of having 60% to 100% of their electricity supplied from clean, renewable sources. Library services are provided by the County of Contra Costa. The City contracts with East Bay Sanitary for garbage and green waste collection service through a franchise agreement. Comcast, AT&T, and a host of smaller companies provide telecommunication services.

== Education ==
El Cerrito is in the West Contra Costa Unified School District, a multi-city district that operates three elementary schools, two middle schools, and two high schools in the city:

- Fairmont Elementary School
- Harding Elementary School
- Madera Elementary School
- Fred T. Korematsu Middle School (opened in 2015 at the site of the former Castro Elementary School, replacing Portola Middle School, which was deemed seismically unsafe)
- El Cerrito High School
- Summit K2 (which is both a middle school and a high school)

== Infrastructure ==
=== Transportation ===
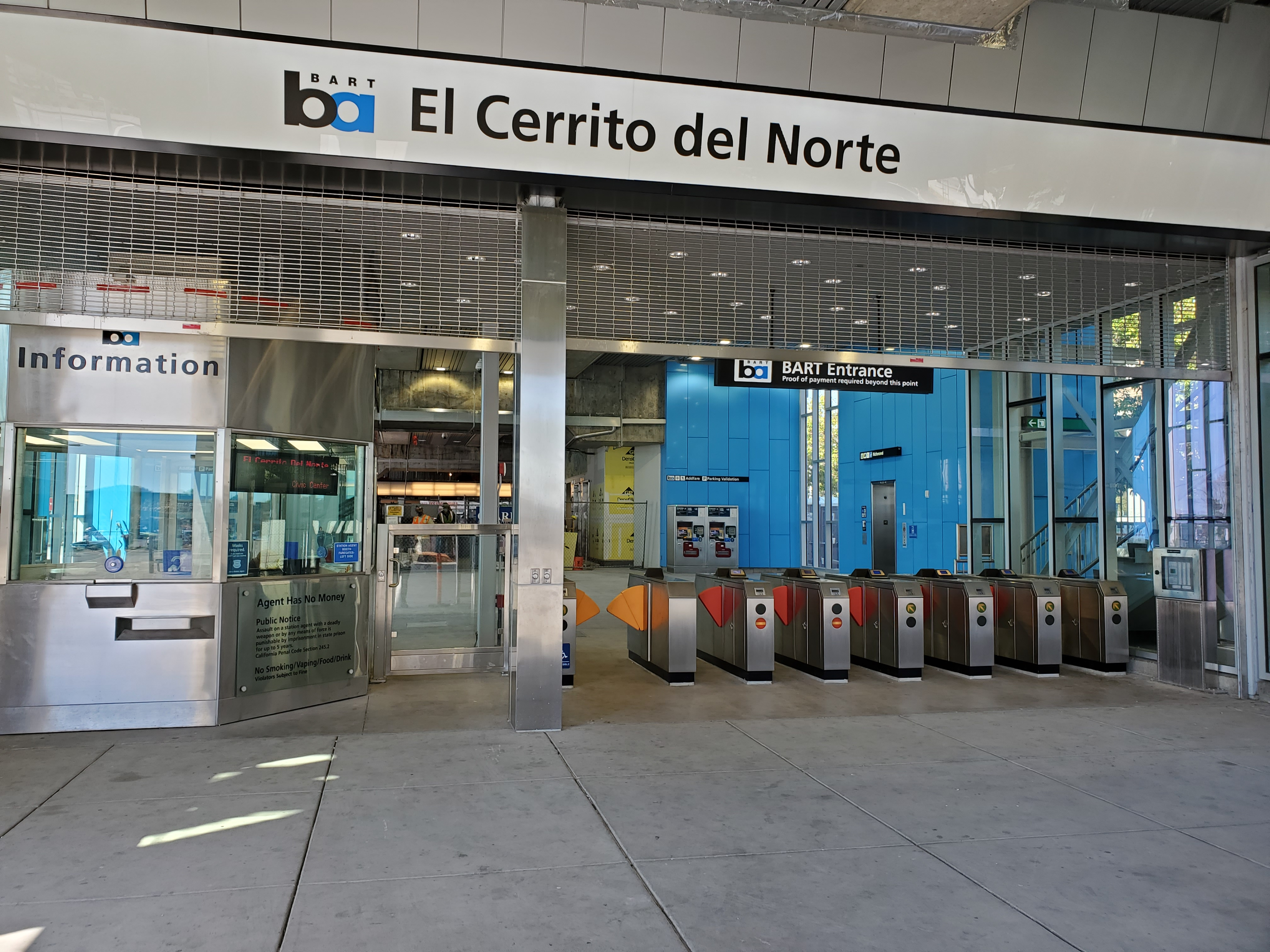
El Cerrito del Norte station, served by Bay Area Rapid Transit

Interstate 80 runs north–south through El Cerrito, with San Pablo Avenue serving as the primary surface artery. Bay Area Rapid Transit serves two stations in the city – El Cerrito del Norte and El Cerrito Plaza – while AC Transit operates local bus service. El Cerrito del Norte station is a major hub for AC Transit, as well as North Bay regional bus operators including FAST, Golden Gate Transit, Vallejo Transit, Napa VINE, and WestCat.

The Ohlone Greenway is part of a regional north–south active transportation route, and is a popular path for bike commuters and recreational cyclists and pedestrians.

== Notable people ==
- Catherine Asaro, science-fiction author, grew up in El Cerrito
- Jeff Atwood, co-founder of Stack Overflow
- Paul Baloff, lead vocalist of metal band Exodus
- Les Blank, documentary filmmaker (1935–2013)
- Ernie Broglio, former Major League Baseball player
- Doug Clifford, musician
- Emily Compagno, television journalist and Fox News host
- Stu Cook, musician
- John C. Dvorak, right-wing podcaster
- John Fogerty and Tom Fogerty, musicians from the band Creedence Clearwater Revival; grew up in El Cerrito; band reunited to play its last concert during 1983 El Cerrito High School reunion at Golden Gate Fields in Albany
- Drew Gooden, Milwaukee Bucks forward, attended El Cerrito High School; during his tenure, basketball team went to and lost state basketball final
- Karen Grassle, actress, Little House on the Prairie, resident of El Cerrito
- Pumpsie Green, first African American to play for the Boston Red Sox
- Larissa Kelly, record-setting Jeopardy! champion
- Tung-Yen Lin, structural engineer who founded T. Y. Lin International
- Alec Palao, British musician, music historian and writer
- Thomas Pridgen, former drummer for the band The Mars Volta
- Susan Rasky, journalist
- Maria Remenyi, Miss California USA 1966, Miss USA 1966
- Alice Schwartz, co-founder of Bio-Rad Laboratories, billionaire
- Marcus Semien, Major League Baseball player
- Adam Sessler, co-host of X-Play on G4
- Chris Strachwitz, founder of Arhoolie records
- Maw Shein Win, first Poet Laureate of El Cerrito
- Tess Taylor, poet and CNN contributor
- Gail Tsukiyama, author
- Joyo Velarde, musician
- Matt Young, former Major League Baseball player
