= California Historical Landmarks in San Francisco =

List table of the properties and districts — listed on the California Historical Landmarks — within City and County of San Francisco, California.

- Note: Click the "Map of all coordinates" link to the right to view a Google map of all properties and districts with latitude and longitude coordinates in the table below.

== Listings ==
Image		Landmark name	Location	Neighborhood/Region	Summary
Birthplace of the United Nations, War Memorial Complex	964	Birthplace of the United Nations, War Memorial Complex	San Francisco War Memorial and Performing Arts Center; 37°46′46″N 122°25′14″W	Civic Center	
California Masonic Lodge No. 1	408	California Masonic Lodge No. 1	728 Montgomery St. 37°47′45″N 122°24′12″W	Jackson Square	
California Theatre	86	California Theatre	430 Bush St., between Kearny St. and Grant Ave. 37°47′27″N 122°24′17″W	Financial District	
Castillo de San Joaquín	82	Castillo de San Joaquín	SE corner of fort wall, Fort Point (below Golden Gate Bridge); 37°48′38″N 122°28′36″W	Presidio	
City of Paris building	876	City of Paris building	SE corner of Geary and Stockton sts. 37°47′15″N 122°24′24″W	Union Square	
Conservatory of Flowers	841	Conservatory of Flowers	100 John F. Kennedy Dr. 37°46′20″N 122°27′36″W	Golden Gate Park	
Eastern Terminus of Clay Street Hill Railroad	500	Eastern Terminus of Clay Street Hill Railroad	Portsmouth Square; 37°47′41″N 122°24′18″W	Chinatown	
El Camino Real	784	El Camino Real	310-336 Dolores St. 37°45′51″N 122°25′35″W	Mission District	The same plaque is located in San Diego
Entrance of the San Carlos into San Francisco Bay	236	Entrance of the San Carlos into San Francisco Bay	Aquatic Park, NW corner of Beach and Larkin sts. 37°48′24″N 122°25′22″W	Fisherman's Wharf	
Farnsworth's Green Street Lab	941	Farnsworth's Green Street Lab	NW corner of Sansome and Green sts. 37°48′01″N 122°24′10″W	North Beach	
Upload Photo	1002	First dynamite factory in the United States	Glen Canyon Park; 37°44′20″N 122°26′31″W	Diamond Heights/Glen Park	The location of a subsequent Giant Powder Company factory in Point Pinole is listed as California Historical Landmark number 1002-1.
First Jewish religious services in San Francisco	462	First Jewish religious services in San Francisco	735 Montgomery St., between Washington and Jackson sts. 37°47′46″N 122°24′13″W	Jackson Square	
First public school in California	587	First public school in California	Portsmouth Plaza; 37°47′41″N 122°24′20″W	Chinatown	
First San Francisco Mint building	87	First San Francisco Mint building	608-610 Commercial St. 37°47′39″N 122°24′12″W	Financial District	
Fort Gunnybags	90	Fort Gunnybags	S side of Sacramento St. between Davis and Front sts. 37°47′40″N 122°23′54″W	Financial District	
Golden Gate Bridge	974	Golden Gate Bridge	Toll gate area, S end of bridge 37°48′26″N 122°28′32″W	Presidio	
Hudson's Bay Company headquarters	819	Hudson's Bay Company headquarters	505 Montgomery St. 37°47′39″N 122°24′12″W	Financial District	
Juana Briones, pioneer settler of Yerba Buena	1024	Juana Briones, pioneer settler of Yerba Buena	Washington Square; 37°48′04″N 122°24′34″W	North Beach	
Landing place of Captain J. Montgomery	81	Landing place of Captain J. Montgomery	552 Montgomery St. 37°47′41″N 122°24′19″W	Financial District	
Laurel Hill Cemetery	760	Laurel Hill Cemetery	3333 California St.	Laurel Heights	
Liberty Bell Slot Machine	937	Liberty Bell Slot Machine	Traffic island on N side of Market St. between Bush and Battery sts. 37°47′28″N 122°23′58″W	Financial District	
Long Wharf	328	Long Wharf	Leidesdorff and Commercial sts.	Financial District	
Lucas, Turner & Co. Bank	453	Lucas, Turner & Co. Bank	NE corner of Jackson and Montgomery sts.	Jackson Square	
Mark Hopkins Institute of Art	754	Mark Hopkins Institute of Art	California and Mason sts.	Nob Hill	
Upload Photo	459	Mellus and Howard	555 Montgomery St.	Financial District	
Montgomery Block	80	Montgomery Block	600 Montgomery St. 37°47′42″N 122°24′11″W	Financial District	
Niantic Hotel	88	Niantic Hotel	First floor of Two Transamerica Center; 37°47′42″N 122°24′08″W	Financial District	
Office of the California Star newspaper	85	Office of the California Star newspaper	743 Washington St.	Chinatown	
Old Saint Mary's Cathedral	810	Old Saint Mary's Cathedral	660 California St. 37°47′34″N 122°24′21″W	Nob Hill	
Original Mission Dolores and Dolores Lagoon	327	Original Mission Dolores and Dolores Lagoon	Camp and Albion sts. 37°45′51″N 122°25′22″W	Mission District	
Original site of the Bancroft Library	791	Original site of the Bancroft Library	1538 Valencia St.	Mission District	
Original site of St. Mary's College	772	Original site of St. Mary's College	Mission and College sts.	Bernal Heights	
Upload Photo	1010	Original site of the Third Baptist Church	Grant Ave. and Greenwich St. 37°48′09″N 122°24′28″W	Telegraph Hill	
Upload Photo	89	Parrott Granite Block	California and Montgomery sts.	Financial District	
Portsmouth Plaza	119	Portsmouth Plaza	Portsmouth Square	Chinatown	
Presidio of San Francisco	79	Presidio of San Francisco	Funston Ave. and Lincoln Blvd. 37°47′53″N 122°27′57″W	Presidio	
Rincon Hill	84	Rincon Hill	Rincon and Bryant sts.	Rincon Hill	
San Francisco Mint	875	San Francisco Mint	88 5th St. at Mission St. 37°46′58″N 122°24′21″W	South of Market	
Sarcophagus of Thomas Starr King	691	Sarcophagus of Thomas Starr King	First Unitarian Church (San Francisco)	Western Addition	
Site of the first California State Fair	861	Site of the first California State Fair	269 Bush St. 37°47′27″N 122°24′05″W	Financial District	
Site of the Jenny Lind Theatre and San Francisco City Hall	192	Site of the Jenny Lind Theatre and San Francisco City Hall	750 Kearny St. at Merchant St. 37°47′42″N 122°24′17″W	Portsmouth Square	
Tablets of San Francisco Bay	83	Tablets of San Francisco Bay	Plaques in sidewalk, NE and SW corners of Bush and Market sts. 37°47′29″N 122°23′57″W	Financial District	Tablets in downtown San Francisco marking the site of the original shoreline.
Telegraph Hill	91	Telegraph Hill	37°48′09″N 122°24′21″W	Telegraph Hill	
Treasure Island	987	Treasure Island	37°49′N 122°22′W	Treasure Island	
Union Square	623	Union Square	Geary and Powell sts. 37°47′17″N 122°24′27″W	Union Square	
Western business headquarters of Russell, Majors and Waddell (Pony Express)	696	Western business headquarters of Russell, Majors and Waddell (Pony Express)	601 Montgomery St. 37°47′42″N 122°24′12″W	Financial District	
What Cheer House	650	What Cheer House	SW corner of Sacramento and Leidesdorff sts. 37°47′38″N 122°24′08″W	Financial District	
Woodward's Gardens	454	Woodward's Gardens	SW corner of Mission and Duboce sts.	Mission District	

== See also ==
- List of San Francisco Designated Landmarks
- List of California Historical Landmarks
- National Register of Historic Places listings in San Francisco
