= Richmond Golf Club (California) =

Park in California, United States of America

Coordinates: 37.9890894°N 122.3488599°W

- Interactive map of Richmond Golf Club

Club information
- Location: Richmond, California
- Established: 1924 (as Carquinez Golf Club)
- Type: Private
- Tota holes: 18
- Website: Richmond Golf Club
- Designed by: Pat J. Markovich
- Par: 72
- Length: 6,549 yards
- Course rating: 71.9
- Slope rating: 127

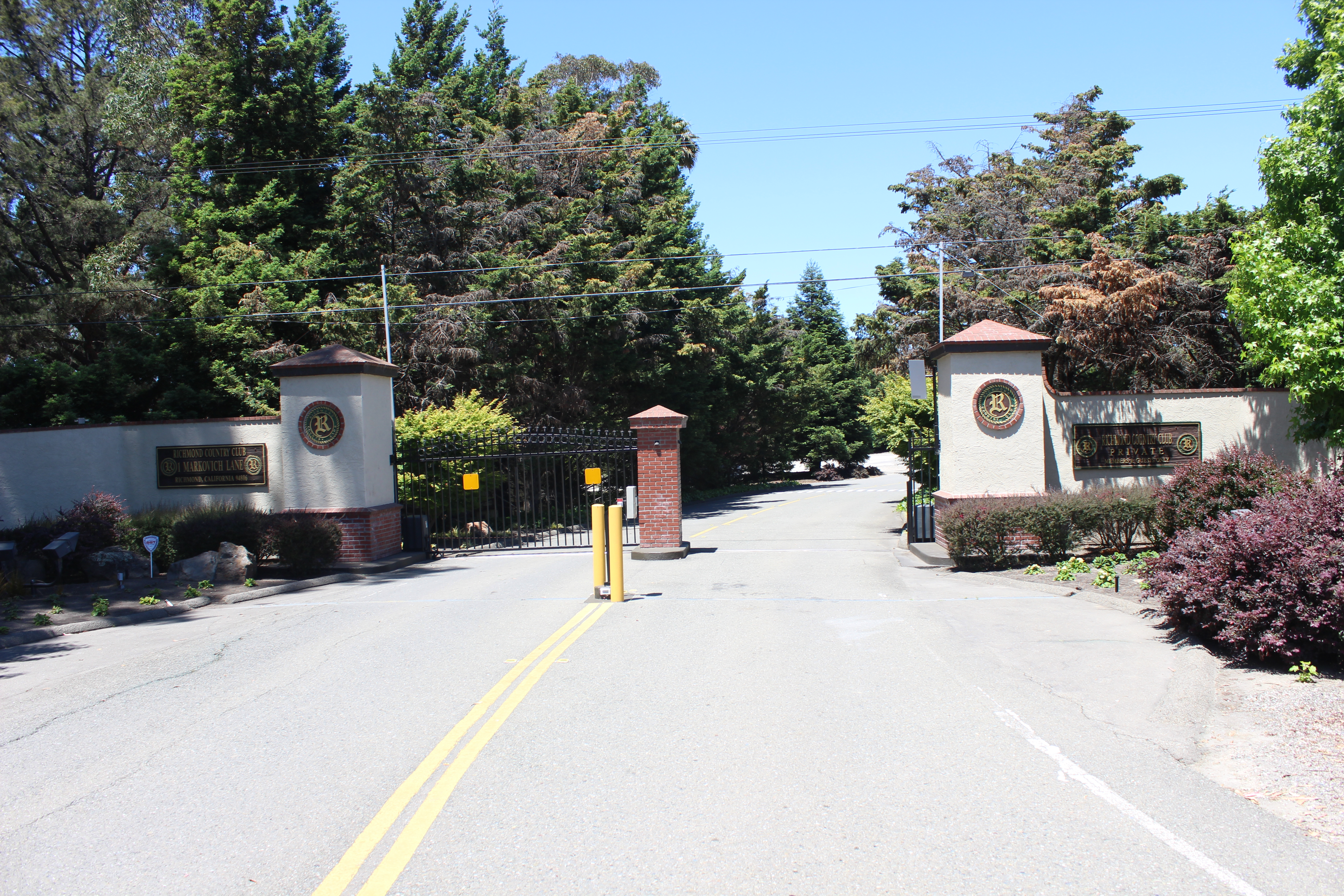
The front entrance to Richmond Golf Club

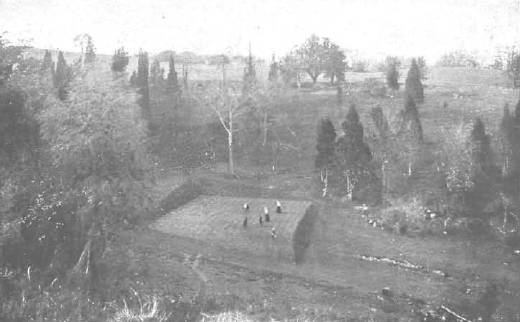
The Golf Course in 1900

The Richmond Golf Club (formerly known as Richmond Country Club) is a private social gathering place and sports facility for golf in the Hilltop District of Richmond, California, United States.

== History ==
The land was originally inhabited by the Huichiun band of Ohlone people; the tribelet would migrate through this area between fishing grounds in Point Pinole and their village at the now Wildcat Canyon Regional Park. Later Spanish conquistadores colonized the land in the 1840s and developed the Rancho San Pablo.

The Richmond Golf Club began formerly known as the Carquinez Golf Club, established in 1924. The club began to struggle during the deep recession. Which was a semi-private club meaning if you weren’t a member a round of golf could be played for 5 cents.

Its manager and head professional, Ed Sawyer, has been found dead of a self-inflicted gunshot wound. Ed poured his own money into the Carquinez CC until he ran out of cash. There were less than 40 members at that time. The course had been redesigned to the present configuration in the early 1930s, but was in poor condition and still lacked the necessary water for proper irrigation.

The few existing members reached out to Pat Markovich who was well known on the West Coast as an excellent golfer and a member of the PGA.

There was a small Board of Directors, but Pat Markovich ran the Carquinez CC. The club was not an immediate success. The country club was eventually rebranded as the "Richmond Golf Club" in the early 1930s.

The golf club has views towards the Golden Gate Bridge, Bay Bridge and Mount Tamalpais.

The club is a former four-time PGA Tour stop and the first in the United States to invite African Americans to participate in professional tournaments. They joined the likes of Ben Hogan, Byron Nelson and Sam Snead who won the 1945 Richmond Open with a 72-hole winning score of 283.

In the early 1950s Richmond Golf Club hosted the LPGA Tour with the best players of the decade. Babe Didrikson Zaharias won the first Richmond Ladies Open with a score of 224 after three rounds. Patty Berg won the second Women's Open in 1952, shooting 8-under par from the men’s tees and set a women’s course record that stands to this day.

In April 1953, Pat Markovich and several other investors from Richmond bought the Maxwell estate located on the Silverado Trail in Napa to form the Silverado Country Club.

The ranch was subdivided into 140 parcels and the area around the present-day country club was formed into the Nitro Powder Company which changed hands to the Giant Powder Company (also formerly known as Giant). In 1964 it was again sold to Bethlehem Steel. A portion of the steel site was sold to create an expanded Richmond Country Club in 1974.

The club covers thousands of acres in the northern Hilltop neighborhood between Hilltop Mall and Point Pinole and is adjacent to Parchester Village to the west, near its entrance along Atlas road and the Richmond Parkway. It is served by AC Transit's route 71 and formerly others. It is on more than 50 acres (20.23 ha) and has been around since before 1900. Since 1991 the club has hosted a charity tournament for disadvantaged students of Salesian College Preparatory (formerly Salesian High School).

In 2018, Pat Markovich was inducted into the Northern California PGA Hall of Fame section.

In late 2023, the golf course was rebranded back as the Richmond Golf Club.
