= James Francis Dunn =

American architect (1874–1921)

James Francis "J. F." Dunn (1874 – October 19, 1921) was an American architect who designed many buildings in San Francisco, California. His work demonstrated his appreciation of a wide range of architecture styles.

The Gaughran House (1900) at 2731–2735 Folsom Street in the Mission District, San Francisco is his oldest surviving work; it is in the Beaux-Arts style and is listed as a San Francisco Designated Landmark since 2017.

== List of works ==
- Gaughran House (1900), 2731–2735 Folsom Street, San Francisco; SFDL-listed
- Apartment Building on Franklin Street (1900), 2415–2417 Franklin Street, San Francisco
- Bliss Flats (1901), 1347 McAllister Street, San Francisco
- Alhambra Apartments (1913), 860 Geary Street, San Francisco
- Chambord Apartments (1921), 1298 Sacramento Street, San Francisco; SFDL-listed, CHL-listed, and NRHP-listed

== See also ==
- California Historical Landmarks in San Francisco County, California
- National Register of Historic Places listings in San Francisco
