= Giant Powder Company =

Explosives manufacturing company in California, United States

- Company type: Manufacturing
- Industry: Explosives
- Founded: 1867 in San Francisco, California, United States
- Founder: Julius Bandmann
- Fate: Defunct
- Products: Dynamite
- Owner: Atlas Powder Company (from 1915)

The Giant Powder Company was an explosives manufacturing company which operated from the mid 19th century through the first half of the 20th century, located in the San Francisco Bay Area of California. The Giant Powder Company was the first company in the United States to produce dynamite under an exclusive license from Alfred Nobel.

== History ==
The company was incorporated in August 1867 by Julius Bandmann of San Francisco for the express purpose of manufacturing Nobel's newly patented explosive in the United States. Bandmann immediately began construction of his factory in what was then the remote southern part of San Francisco, now Glen Canyon Park in the Glen Park neighborhood of the city. The facility was ready by early 1868, with production commencing in March. The location of this factory is listed as California Historical Landmark number 1002.

On November 26, 1869, an explosion destroyed the Giant dynamite factory, killing two and injuring nine people. A new facility was subsequently built at another site located in the western part of San Francisco, among the sand dunes and scrub that later became part of the Sunset District (in the vicinity of today's Kirkham, Ortega, 20th, and 32nd Avenues), but another accident destroyed that plant as well.

=== Plants in Albany and Berkeley ===
The public outcry that ensued from these two accidents prompted the Giant Powder Company to move across the bay to a more remote site that today straddles the city limits of Berkeley and Albany, between Fleming Point and Cerrito de San Antonio (later renamed "Albany Hill"). The railroad station for the facility was named "Nobel". The Judson Manufacturing Co., whose founder and CEO Egbert Judson had acquired an interest in Giant when it was still located in San Francisco, established its chemical works adjacent to the Giant plant to supply it with the acids for manufacturing dynamite.

On April 15, 1880, another accidental explosion occurred killing many workers and several visitors. The company then instituted more stringent safety measures, including the planting of eucalyptus trees atop the adjacent hill to act as a buffer for surrounding communities. During the 1880s, Giant decided to start manufacturing its own acids, creating a rift with partner Judson who then left the company and formed his own in 1890, the Judson Explosives and Powder Company. He constructed his own facility nearby, on the northwest side of the Cerrito de San Antonio.

On July 9, 1892, an explosion occurred on the Giant property which killed nine workers and caused damage to the nearby Judson site. The blast was widely felt, shattering windows for miles around, including those on the campus of the University of California. The facility was entirely destroyed. Judson sued Giant for its damages and won.

=== Point Pinole explosives plant ===
In 1892, the Giant Powder Company moved once again, this time to Sobrante near Point Pinole, northwest of San Pablo (Sobrante should not be confused with nearby El Sobrante, California). The company town of Giant, Richmond, California was established by 1895.

In 1904, two men were killed in an explosion at the plant.

In 1907, two men were killed and many injured in an explosion at the plant.

In 1915, the Giant Powder Company was acquired by the Atlas Powder Company. Atlas, as well as the Hercules Powder Company, had been formed in 1912 as part of the settlement of the court-ordered breakup of the DuPont Corporation's explosives monopoly. The new management implemented more rigorous safety measures.

Giant's production facility remained at Point Pinole for decades without any further serious accidents, although there were a few incidents. Giant produced a wide variety of explosives for commercial and military uses until 1960. The area where explosives were manufactured was named "Nitro" while the nearby company town was called "Giant". The area is still shown on maps as "Giant", and a principal thoroughfare through the area is called "Giant Highway". The site of the Giant Powder Company at Point Pinole Regional Shoreline is a California Historical Landmark, number 1002-1, marked with a monument and plaque.

On May 31, 1961, shortly after the Atlas Powder Company closed its Giant facility, it changed its name to Atlas Chemical Industries, Inc. as it started to move away from producing explosives. On July 21, 1971, Atlas was purchased by Imperial Chemical Industries Limited (UK) and became its American affiliate under the name ICI Americas Inc.

== See also ==
- California Powder Works
