= Atlas Powder Company =

American explosive and chemical company

- Type: Public company
- Industry: Chemicals, explosives
- Founded: 1912; 114 years ago
- Fate: Reenamed Atlas Chemical Industries, Inc., then acquired by Imperial Chemical Industries
- Successor: AstraZeneca
- Headquarters: Wilmington, Delaware. U.S., Wilmington, Delaware, U.S.

Atlas Powder Company was an American explosives and chemicals company. It was one of the two companies that emerged out of a court-ordered breakup of the explosives monopoly of Du Pont Powder Company, the explosives and gunpowder company founded by French-American chemist and industrialist Éleuthère Irénée du Pont de Nemours.

== History ==
=== Establishment ===
Based on the U.S. Justice Department's proposal, a Philadelphia court approved a decree on June 13, 1912, that ordered the division of Du Pont Powder Company into three independent entities. The decision concluded an anti-monopoly case filed by the United States government against the company under the Sherman Antitrust Act. These three new companies, which became independent companies and substantial competitors, were called Hercules Powder Company, Atlas Powder Company, and the du Pont de Nemours Powder Company. Atlas was officially incorporated on October 18, 1912, in Wilmington, Delaware. However, Pierre and Irenee DuPont, president and vice-president of DuPont, still owned large blocks of stock in the company as was in the case of Hercules.

=== Expansion ===
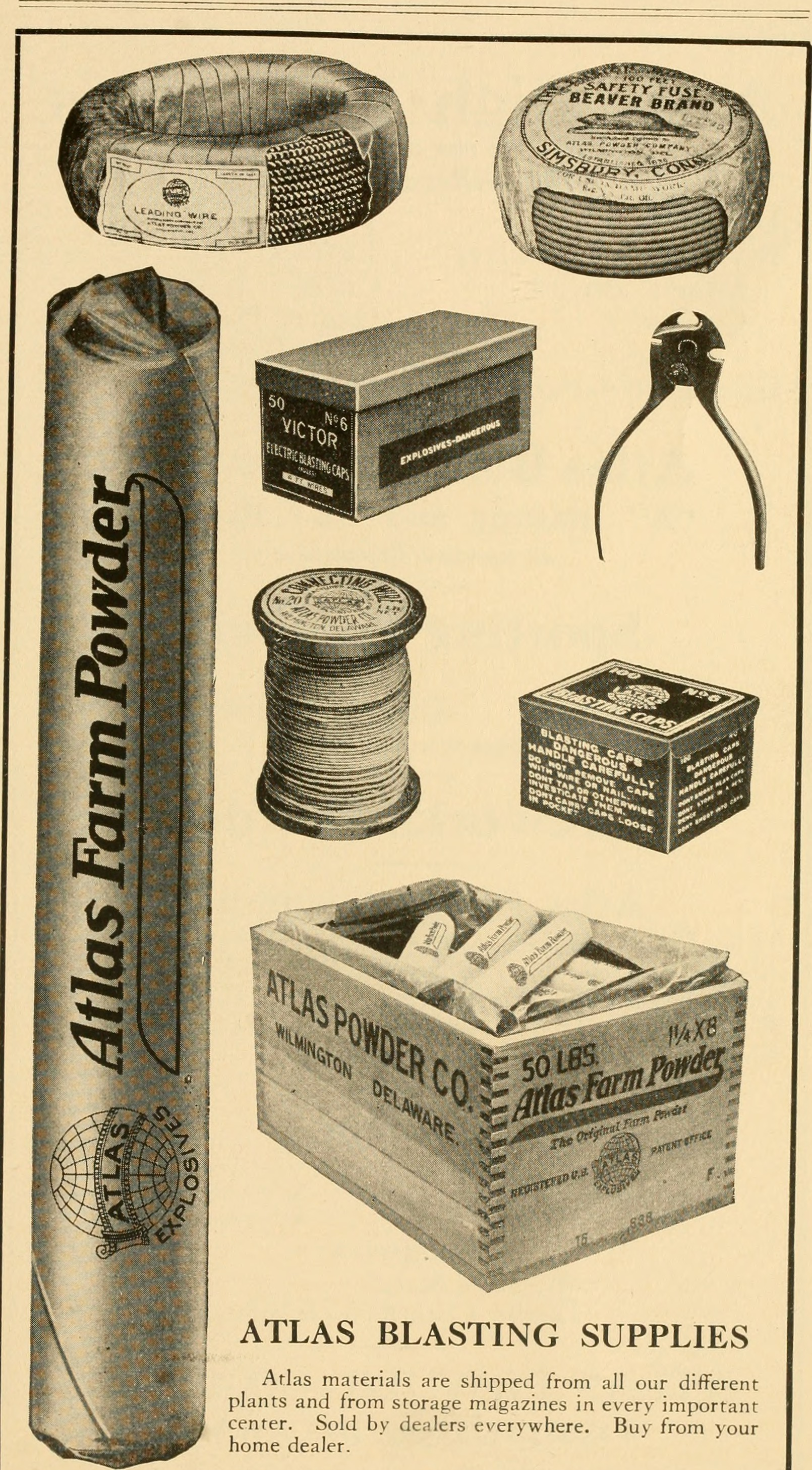
A pamphlet of an Atlas explosive product used for farming.

Atlas Powder Company and Hercules competed with DuPont in the manufacture of dynamite and black powder. It purchased Giant Powder Company in 1915, which continued to operate a production facility at Point Pinole until 1960. By 1919, Atlas Powder Company became a military supplier. During the years leading up to World War I, it was also Britain and France's main supplier of explosives. It delivered 37 million pounds of ammonium nitrate as well as acids and nitro cotton. It became one of the five major companies that served the American munitions market. The company worked for the U.S. government. An example was its operation of a plant in Maryland, which was built by the United States Ordnance Department. This facility produced 452,000 pounds of ammonium nitrate. Along with Hercules Powder Company and DuPont Company, Atlas Powder Company also supported the Allied armies during World War II.

Employment at Atlas reached its greatest peak during this period, reaching 1,617 in 1947. This number declined with the decreasing use of anthracite. Atlas Powder Company was renamed as Atlas Chemical Industries, which became a corporate predecessor of AstraZeneca, through an acquisition in 1971 by Imperial Chemical Industries.

== Breakthroughs ==
Another technology attributed to the company was the HLB number scale, which was considered the first ever successful attempt of a quantitative characterization of the hydrophile-lipophile balance of different surfactants. In collaboration with the University of Pittsburgh, it developed a stable polymorph of sorbitol during the 1960s.

In 1984, Atlas Powder Company filed a patent infringement case against DuPont over an invention that featured a water-resistant emulsion-based blasting agent.
