= Parchester Village, Richmond, California =

Planned village in Richmond, California, U.S.

Coordinates: 37°59′10″N 122°21′14″W

Parchester Village is a planned majority African-American village in northwestern Richmond, California that was the first in the state to sell to blacks.

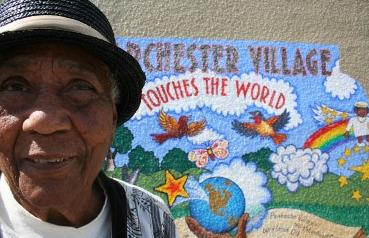
Mary "Peace" Head longtime Parchester Village activist by the peace mural.

== History ==
After World War II temporary housing was torn down in Richmond, many black residents were not allowed to move into what was left. This culminated in the efforts of Reverend Guthrie John Williams, who in 1949 cut a deal that exchanged support for council member Amos Hinkley for more black housing. Although Hinkley did not win reelection, he did introduce Williams to Fred Parr, a wealthy white real estate developer who helped to develop the 400 or so single story homes.

Parchester Village was originally planned as the first residential development for "All Americans", but became an all-black neighborhood when whites lost interest in purchasing here after finding out it was to be racially mixed. The streets are named after black pastors of the time, most notably Williams Street, one of the community's main arteries. The name Parchester comes from Fred Parr, the last name of the Richmond businessman who funded and created the development.

In 2002, Parchester Village was nearly 80% African-American, with a growing Latino, Asian, and White population. The Latino population has been steadily increasing over the years to largely positive reactions from the Afro-American community. By the 2020 census, the African-American population had declined to 20%.

The community enjoyed widespread access to Dotson Family Marsh (formerly Breuner Marsh) from swimming to fishing on its pier for decades. However, over the years access was limited by destruction of the wetlands and changes in ownership. In the 1970s, the community lobbied successfully to prevent an airfield's construction at the site. Several home developers attempted to build upscale development similar to that surrounding the area outside the village. The residents objected and opted for open space access while the city lobbied for a mix of park and a small business center. In the end the land was acquired by East Bay Regional Park District from developers and added to the District's Point Pinole Regional Shoreline in 2010.

In the early 2000s, the Scotts Valley Band of Pomo Indians proposed the 2,000-slot Sugar Bowl Casino just south of the community. Parchester Village residents lauded this as a boon to fight crime and create jobs. Residents from the newly developed sub-divisions along the neighboring Richmond Country Club, on the other hand, were fervently opposed to the casino largely based on perceived potential losses to their property values. Nevertheless, the casino was approved for construction and operation. This is of note because the Point Molate project has consistently failed at being approved while the Casino San Pablo has never been able to approve games of chance not based on bingo.

== Geography ==
The area is served by AC Transit's 71 and 376 bus lines that connect the rather isolated neighborhood with downtown Richmond the BART and Amtrak station, and Contra Costa College in San Pablo. This is in addition to the Hilltop Area and the Richmond Parkway Transit Center commuter hub. There are also about half a dozen 600-series school routes connecting the village with area middle and high schools.

The neighborhood is bordered by Point Pinole Regional Shoreline and the West Contra Costa County Detention Center to the north, Atlas road, SPRR tracks, and the Richmond Country Club to the east, the Richmond Parkway to the southeast, grassland flats to the south, and Breuner Marsh and San Pablo Bay to the west. The area has expansive views of the waterfront, park, and Marin County and North Bay Mountains. The neighborhood's streets are plagued by very serious potholes that have not been addressed by the city due to lack of funds.
