= West County Detention Facility =

Medium-security prison in California, US

Coordinates: 37.994878°N 122.351367°W

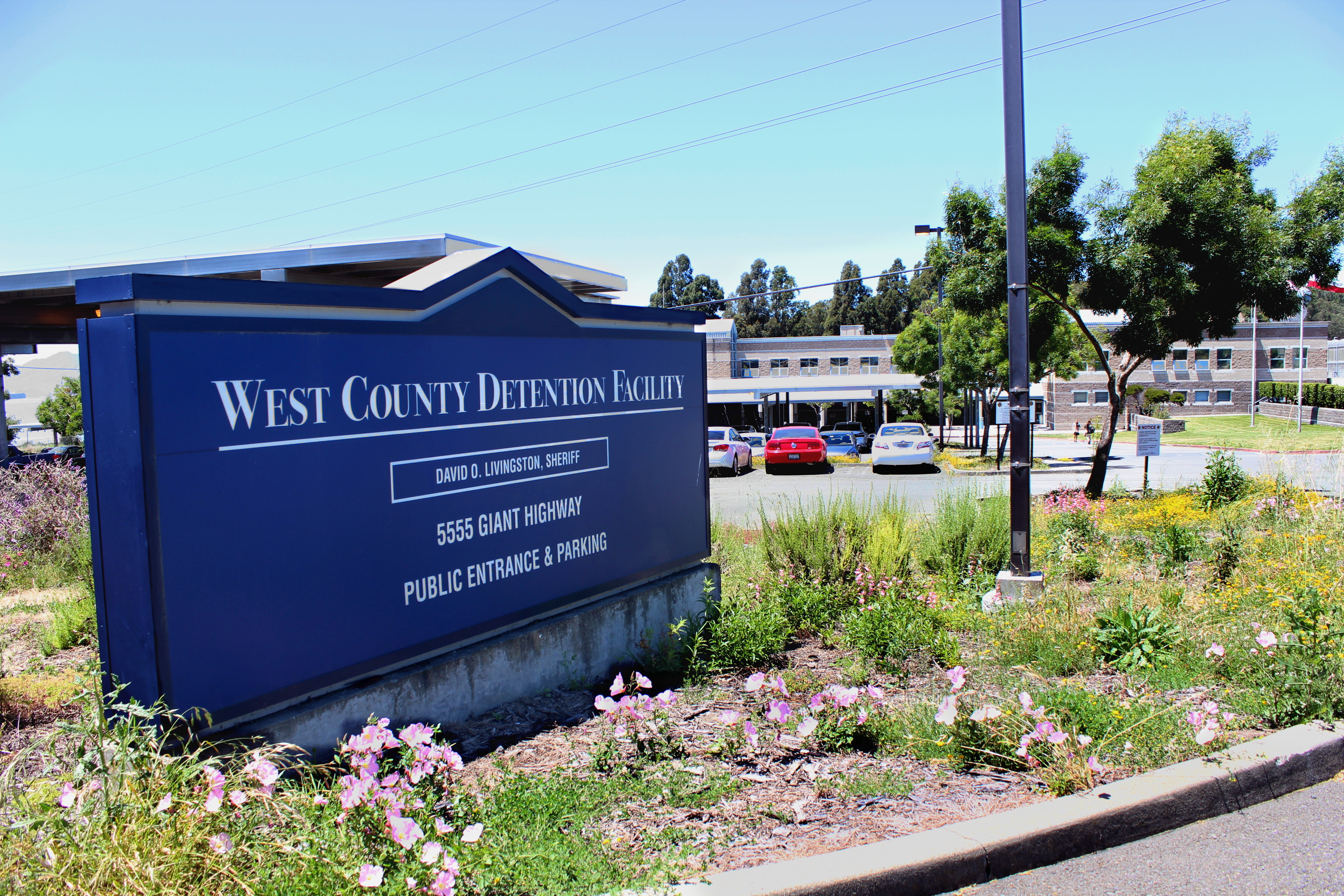
Front sign of the West County Detention Facility in Richmond, California

West County Detention Facility is a large coeducational adult medium security Contra Costa County jail in Richmond, California opened in 1991.

== Overview ==
WCDF is located in the Point Pinole area of the city between Parchester Village to the south, Point Pinole Regional Shoreline to the west and the Hilltop area to the east. The jail can house up to 1,093 inmates. There are five different housing areas, four for males and one for females. The jail is served by route 71 AC Transit bus service seven days a week and route 376 late night. also houses the county's "special needs" inmates.

In 2012, Lori Haley, a spokeswoman for ICE and the Department of Homeland Security, said, "The West County Detention Facility opened in 1991 and is one of nine facilities in California contracted by ICE to hold detainees. It holds about 1,000 inmates. Of that number, an average of 120 to 150 individuals are there under ICE custody and are being processed for removal from the United States based on violations of immigration laws."

== New Jail Project ==
West County Detention Facility is proceeding with the project to expand jail services. The project will cost $25 million in construction and $5 million a year after the construction. The money is going towards the construction of a high-security wing that can jail 400 extra inmates who are currently housed at the Martinez Detention Facility. The supporters of this project state that the project will allow improved mental health treatment and other services to inmates at the Martinez jail by transporting inmates to the newly constructed wing at West County Detention Facility. The opponents, however, state that the project is wrongly focusing on people already detained and not on prevention.

== Programs and Services ==
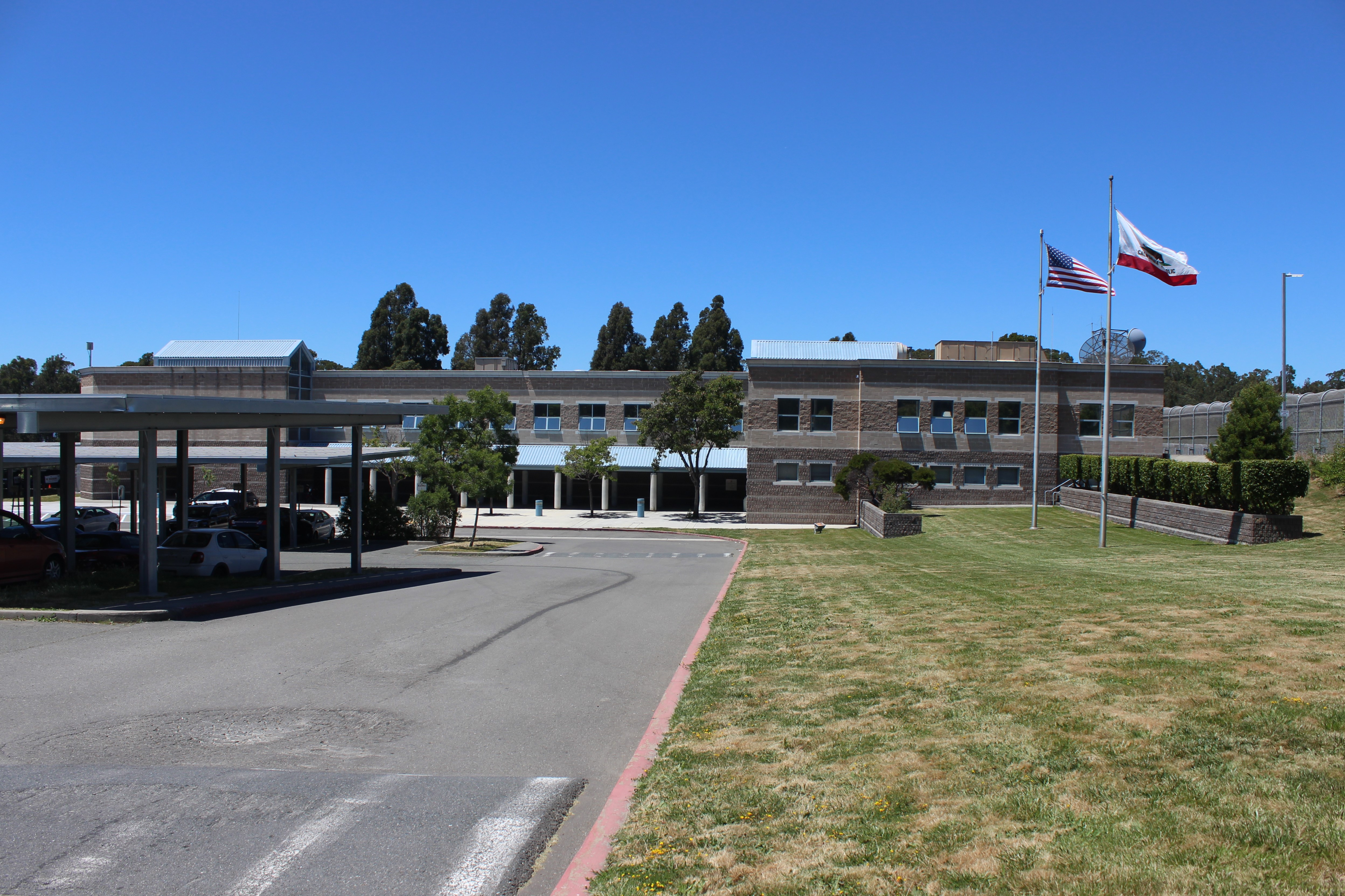
West County Detention Facility main building

The West County Detention Facility offers multiple programs and spaces for inmates to utilize. The spaces provided for them include the following: courtyards, educational classrooms and library facilities. The facility offers programs that the inmates can take advantage of, such as, DEUCE (substance abuse, anger and stress management, job development), computer applications including web design, adult basic education, independent study, transitional services, English as a Second Language (ESL), GED / High School Diploma preparation and testing, sign making, and chaplain program.

== Detainee conditions ==
In December 2017, Senator Dianne Feinstein formally asked ICE to investigate the detention facility, where multiple federal detainees have stated that they were not allowed to use restrooms. Feinstein wrote, "It has been reported that the conditions are so deplorable that detainees are requesting deportation over pursuing claims in immigration court"
