= Chambord Apartments =

Historic multifamily residential building in San Francisco, California, US

- U.S. National Register of Historic Places
- California Historical Landmark
- San Francisco Designated Landmark
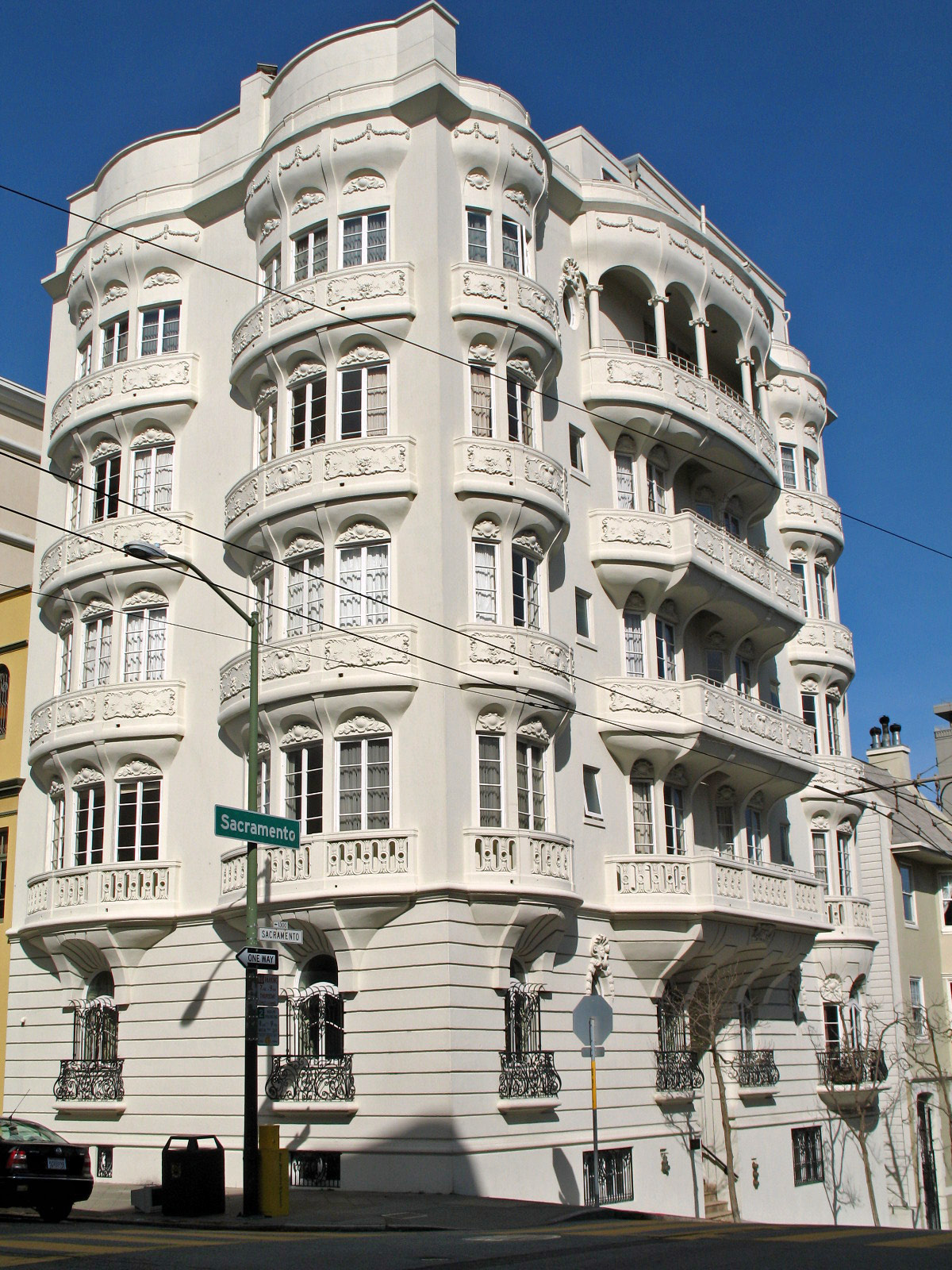

- Location within San Francisco County
- Location: 1298 Sacramento Street, San Francisco, California, U.S.
- Coordinates: 37.792504°N 122.414124°W
- Area: 0.1 acres (0.040 ha)
- Built: 1921
- Architect: James Francis Dunn
- Architectural style: Beaux-Arts
- NRHP reference No.: 84001184
- CHISL No.: N1314
- SFDL No.: 106

Significant dates
- Added to NRHP: September 20, 1984
- Designated CHISL: September 20, 1984
- Designated SFDL: April 23, 1979

Chambord Apartments is a historic apartment building, built in 1921 in the Nob Hill neighborhood in San Francisco, California. It is listed on the National Register of Historic Places since 1984; listed as a California Historical Landmark since 1984; and listed as a San Francisco Designated Landmark since 1979.

== History ==
Chambord Apartments is a five-story apartment building located near the crest of San Francisco's Nob Hill. It designed by architect James Francis Dunn in a Beaux-Arts style. The developer was James Witt Dougherty, the grandson of local politician James Witt Dougherty (1813–1879). It contains nine apartments with a lobby. It has been nicknamed, the "Wedding Cake Building", due to its ornate decoration. It is sometimes referred to as "Parisian-style" due to the building's bulging balconies with extravagant ornamental ironwork and bay windows.

=== Renovations and restorations ===
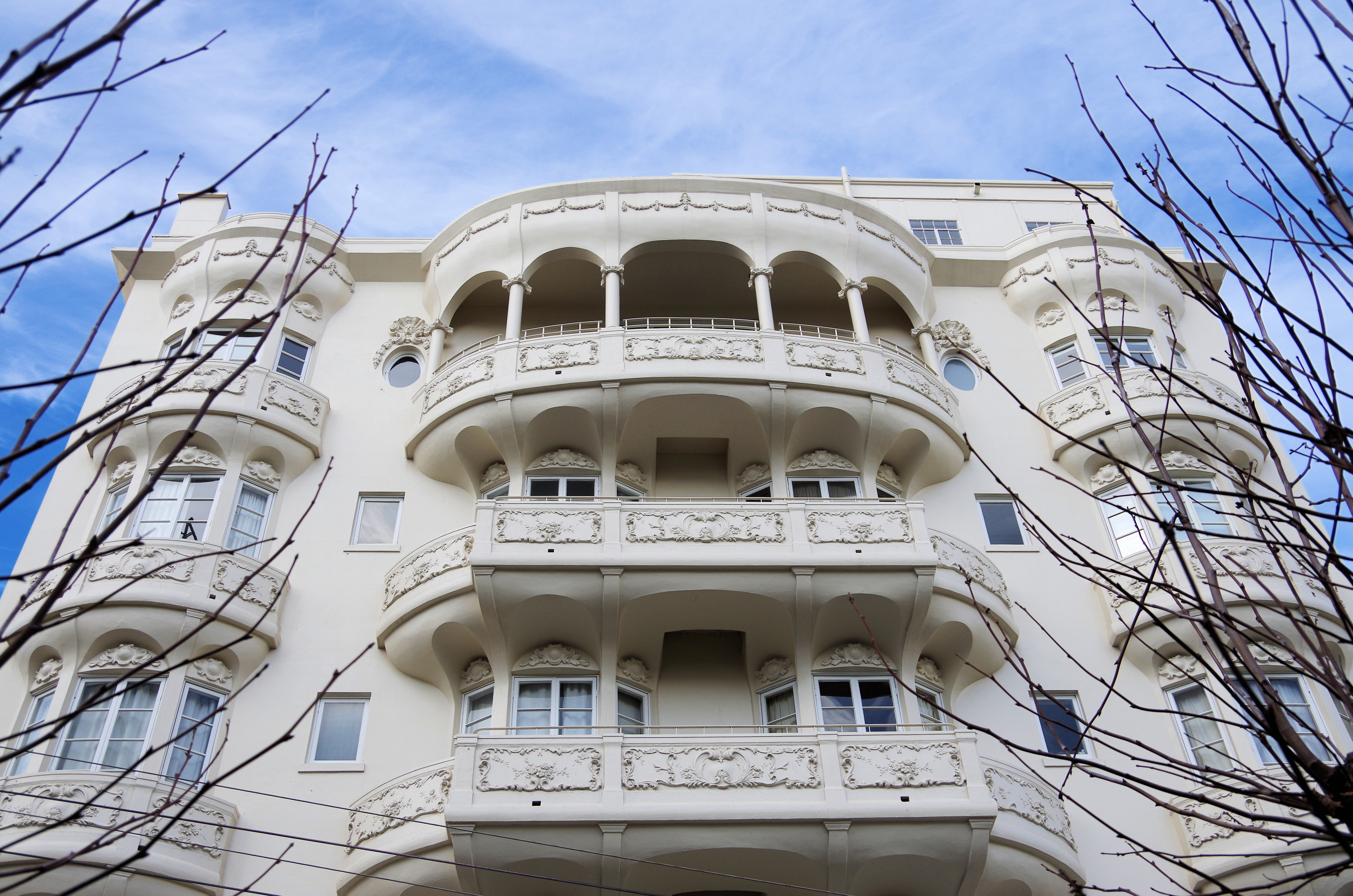
View of the decorative balconies, Chambord Apartments

The fifth floor penthouse was originally a single unit with an open octagon-shaped garden room in the center of the unit, however the floor plan for this unit was modified in 1926. In the 1950s the construction of new wall partitions and new bathrooms further altered the original floor plan. Additionally in the 1950s the exterior decorations were stripped from the building. The building was threatened with demolition in the 1970s because of its state of disrepair.

The Chambord Apartments was restored in 1982–1983, which included the removal of the 1950s additions, restoration of the exterior, and the reinstatement of the original one-unit floor plan for the penthouse.

== See also ==
- National Register of Historic Places listings in San Francisco
- California Historical Landmarks in San Francisco County, California
- List of San Francisco Designated Landmarks
- Gaughran House (1900), also designed by Dunn
