= Dotson Family Marsh =

Regional park in California, US

Coordinates: 37.98227°N 122.362697°W

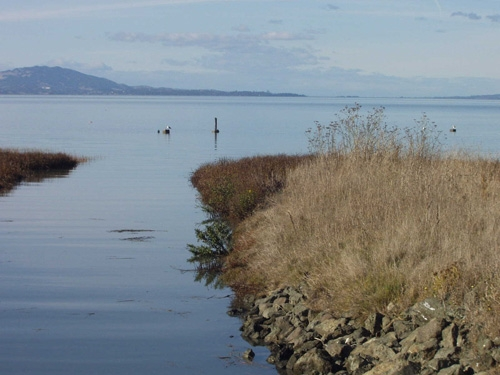
Dotson Family Marsh (formerly Breuner Marsh) — San Pablo Bay and shoreline vegetation in 2008.

The Dotson Family Marsh, formerly Breuner Marsh, is a 238-acre (96 ha) regional park on San Pablo Bay in the East San Francisco Bay Area city of Richmond, California. In 2009 the East Bay Regional Parks District acquired the Breuner Marsh site, adding it to Point Pinole Regional Shoreline. A habitat restoration plan for 60 acres (24 ha) of wetlands and 90 acres (36 ha) of California coastal prairie was subsequently approved.

On April 22, 2017, the district renamed Breuner Marsh as the Dotson Family Marsh, honoring a local family that had worked for many years to keep Breuner Marsh wild and open to the public.

== Geography ==
The boundaries surrounding Dotson Family Marsh are approximately:

- San Pablo Bay to the west.
- Giant Marsh and Point Pinole Regional Shoreline Park to the north.
- a Southern Pacific Railroad embankment and Parchester Village to the east.
- Rheem Creek to the south.

== History ==
The former Breuner Marsh land was owned by Fred Parr in the mid 20th-century. It was/is located between the bay and Parchester Village, a post-WW II master planned community that was the first in the state to sell to African Americans. It was built by Parr with the promise of maintaining the marsh free from development. However, Parr subsequently sold it off, leaving the community's open space in uncertainty.

=== Gerald Breuner ===
The new owner was Gerald Breuner, the owner of the former Breuners Home Furnishings chain. During the 1970s he had much of the wetlands illegally destroyed, with the intention of building a private general aviation airport, to be called Breuner Field. However community and political opposition prohibited it, and the small model plane airfield was the largest he could build, and some of the mixed wetlands—grasslands still remained. In the 1980s Bruener tested experimental aircraft, a gyrocopter, at the site, and used it as his primary residence.

Breuner Field or Breuner Airfield was a 5-acre (2 ha) private radio controlled aircraft airfield or "flying field" and club built in the 1970s. It was located on the illegally reclaimed wetlands, at 4114 Goodrick Avenue, and was accessible from the Richmond Parkway. The site had a sports club, some cottages, and a fishing pier. The runway was about 300 ft (91 m) and is marked with x's to state that it is not suitable for landing by any planes. It was run by the Bay Area Radio Control Society.

=== Bay Area Wetlands LLC ===
Breuner Marsh was purchased in 2000 by Bay Area Wetlands LLC, a company that planned on selling the land to the highest bidding developer. After the purchase by Bay Area Wetlands LLC, various proposals to develop the marsh were put forward. These included upscale housing, an industrial complex, a mixed use transit village with housing businesses, and a transit center, and expansion of Point Pinole Regional Shoreline, with Breuner Marsh being restored. The latter was the preferred option from the Parchester Village Neighborhood Council which had fought development in the past. Development was also fought by the Sierra Club and the North Richmond Shoreline Open Space Alliance, and by Gayle McLaughlin and the East Bay Regional Parks District.

The East Bay Regional Parks District had considered using Eminent Domain to prevent development of the rare undeveloped San Francisco Bay shoreline and to protect endangered species. Bay Area Wetlands LLC at one point wanted to build "Edgewater Technology Park" but were rebuffed by Parchester residents.

Signature Homes, a housing construction firm, bought a six-month option at one point, but was unable to persuade the city council to rezone the area from light industrial, since the city wanted revenue building commercial development instead of funds-draining housing that would place addition strain on city services. The city was willing to zone 27 acres (11 ha) for residential but no more.

A lawsuit was filed against the property owners to protect the open space, and the court's preliminary judgment was reached on March 28, 2008. The jury decided that the value of the 217 acres (0.88 km^{2}) was $6.85 million. This was contrary to the East Bay Regional Parks District's appraiser whom valued it at $1.5 million, and the previous purchase price the Breuners received of $3 million. The defendant owners argued that the city would make up to $18 million off the 27 acres (110,000 m^{2}) where development would be allowed. The owners were allowed to keep 20 acres (8 ha), but appealed the March 2008 decision nonetheless. A sale was finally reached two months later for the undeveloped property.

== Parkland ==
Threatened wildlife species in the area include the white-tailed kite, a state "Species of Concern," and endangered species such as the salt marsh harvest mouse and the California clapper rail.

The East Bay Regional Park District purchased a large portion of the historic Breuner Marsh in May 2008 for $8,830,155. The Park District has approved plans to restore tidal wetlands and coastal prairie habitats on the property. In addition the district planned to add a component of the San Francisco Bay Trail. In 2011, EBRPD acquired Breuner Marsh, using $6,875,000 of its own bond funds. The San Francisco Bay Area Conservancy (SFBAC) joined the EBRPD effort, authorizing $1,250,000 of Conservancy funds plus a $920,000 grant from the state Fish & Wildlife Agency. (Note: SFBAC had previously worked on other restoration projects for the north Richmond shoreline area, including the Richmond Parkway Shoreline Pollution Mitigation Plan in 1995, a Rheem Creek Watershed Assessment and Conceptual Restoration Plan in 2007, and a North Richmond Shoreline Conservation Plan in March 2010.)

On April 22, 2017, the district renamed Breuner Marsh as the Dotson Family Marsh, honoring a local family that had worked for many years to keep Breuner Marsh wild and open to the public, while opposing several attempts to develop the tract for commercial ventures.

== See also ==
- Parks in Richmond, California
- Wetlands of the San Francisco Bay Area
- Species of concern
