= Gaughran House =

Historic house in San Francisco, California, US

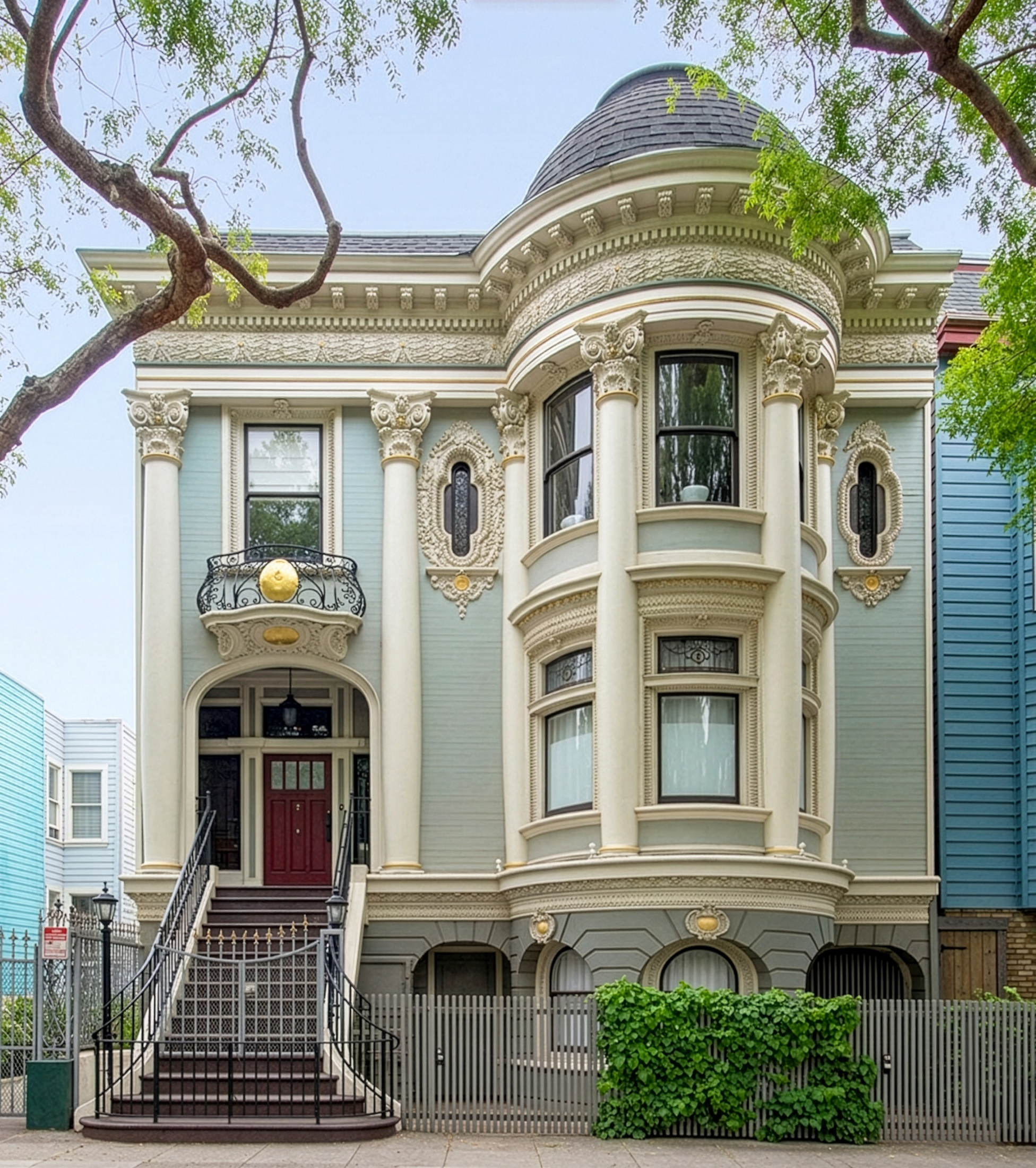
- Interactive map of Gaughran House
- Location: 2731–2735 Folsom Street, Mission District, San Francisco, California, U.S.
- Coordinates: 37.753596°N 122.414019°W
- Built: 1900; 126 years ago
- Architect: James Francis Dunn
- Architectural style: Beaux-Arts style

Gaughran House, also known as Mannerist Classical Flats, is a historic multifamily residence built in 1900, located at 2731–2735 Folsom Street in the Mission District in San Francisco, California. It is a San Francisco Designated Landmark since 2017.

It was designed by architect James Francis Dunn in the Beaux-Arts architecture style. It is the oldest surviving work by Dunn.

== See also ==
- List of San Francisco Designated Landmarks
- Chambord Apartments (1921), also designed by Dunn
