= Breuners Home Furnishings =

American furniture store chain

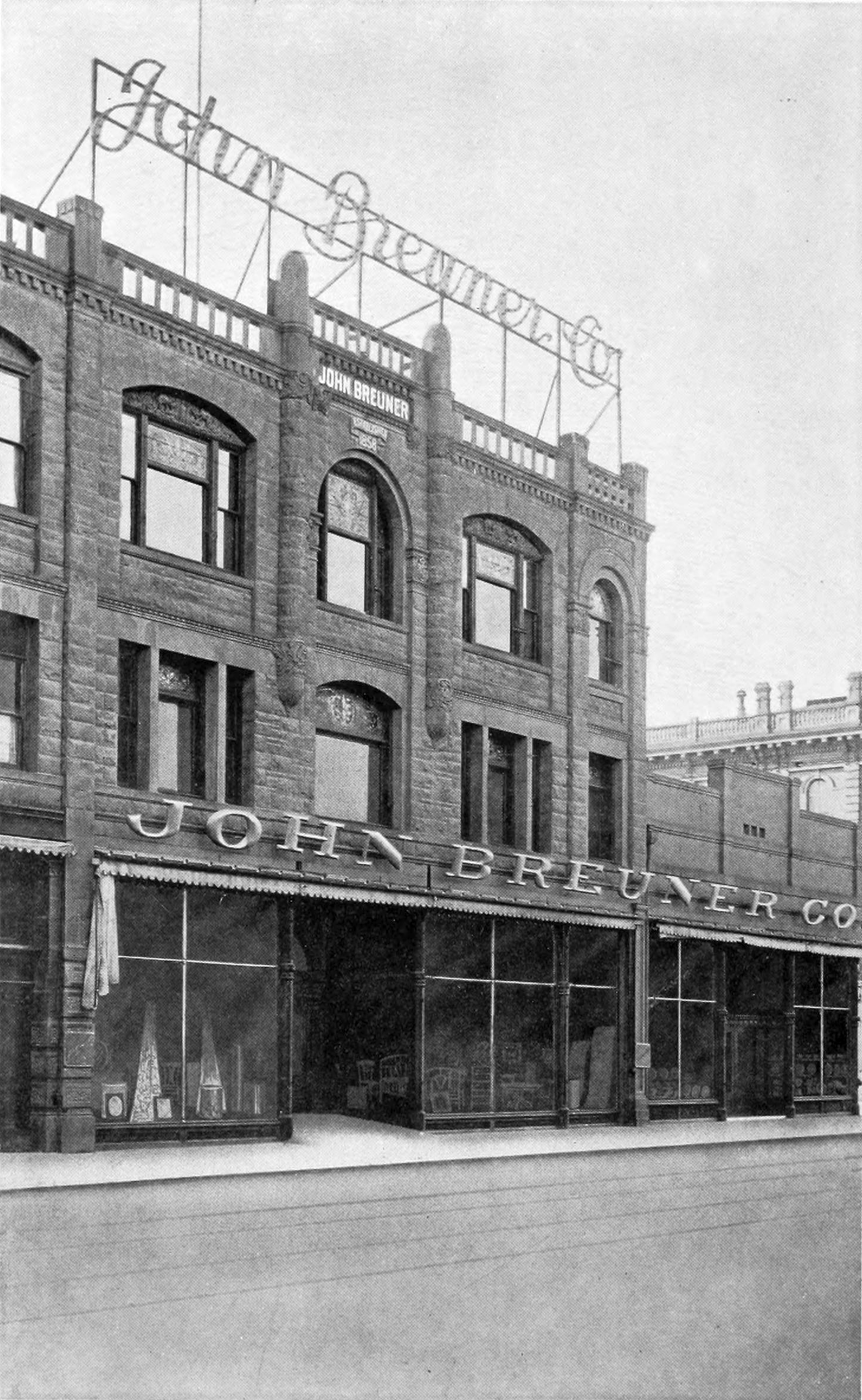
- Sacramento, 1858
- Type: American private company
- Industry: Retail (Specialty)
- Founded: 1856 in Sacramento, California, United States of America
- Founder: John Breuner
- Defunct: 2004 (retailer, internet outlet closed soon after)
- Area served: Internet
- Key people: Bill Breuner, Beth Breuner Grebitus
- Products: furniture
- Website: Now defunct

Breuners Home Furnishings was a chain of furniture stores in Southwestern United States for 148 years before declaring bankruptcy in 2004.

Founded in California during the California gold rush in the mid-19th century, its stores served California and Nevada before expanding to the east coast in the late 20th century. In 2004 the company declared bankruptcy and closed all its retail stores. For a time it had been a virtual brand on the Internet until it too went defunct.

== History ==
The store was founded in 1856 by William Robert “Bill” Breuner's great-grandfather John Breuner (1828–1890) to cater to prospectors during the California gold rush. The first store opened in Sacramento, California, with subsequent branches in Oakland, San Francisco and later throughout California and Nevada. The company went public in 1968 under Bill Breuner. Breuner sold the company in the 1970s and it was acquired by Marshall Field's in 1983. At its height Breuners operated 40 retail outlets. The stores were large bigboxes around 140,000 square feet (13,000 m^{2}). By the 1990s the company was based in San Diego and in 1995 expanded into the New York and New Jersey markets by acquiring Huffman Koos’ 13 stores for 36.9 million dollars. Breuners also owned Good's Furniture stores. Private investment company Oak Point Partners acquired the remnant assets, consisting of any known and unknown assets that weren't previously administered, from the Breuners Home Furnishings Corp., et al., Bankruptcy Estates on November 13, 2012.

== Legacy ==
Breuner Marsh, a wetlands area, and Breuner Field, a model airplane field within it, in addition to the Breuner Building in downtown Oakland, are all named after the family.

== Slogans ==
- That's the beauty of Breuners!
- I've been to Breuners, and now I've seen everything!
- You Breuners it, you bought it!
- Breuners! Where Else?

== See also ==
- Levitz Furniture, a company with a similar history
- Montgomery Ward, a now online only, defunct department store chain
- McCreery's Home Furnishings, a fine furniture store serving Since 1955 in Sacramento, CA
- Sacramento Furniture Store, a family owned furniture store in Sacramento, CA
