= Giant, Richmond, California =

Neighbourhood of Richmond, California, United States

Coordinates: 37°59′26″N 122°21′26″W

Giant (formerly Nitro) was an unincorporated community, now within Point Pinole Regional Shoreline, and annexed to Richmond in Contra Costa County, California, United States. It lies at an elevation of 23 feet (7 m).

== History ==
The town of Nitro—Giant was established in 1892 as a company town by the Giant Powder Company. The company moved its manufacturing facilities to this location, after a factory explosion demolished the two previous plants in Glen Canyon in San Francisco, and on the Cerrito de San Antonio (renamed Albany Hill in 1909) in the then unincorporated northwestern corner of Alameda County adjacent to the city of Berkeley. The Giant Powder Company was the first company in America to produce dynamite. Giant Powder Company's main rival, Hercules Powder Company, was located nearby at what became the town of Hercules.

California Historic Landmark No. 1002-1 is at the location of Giant. Point Pinole Regional Shoreline is in the East Bay Regional Park District.
