= Bank of Lucas, Turner & Co. =

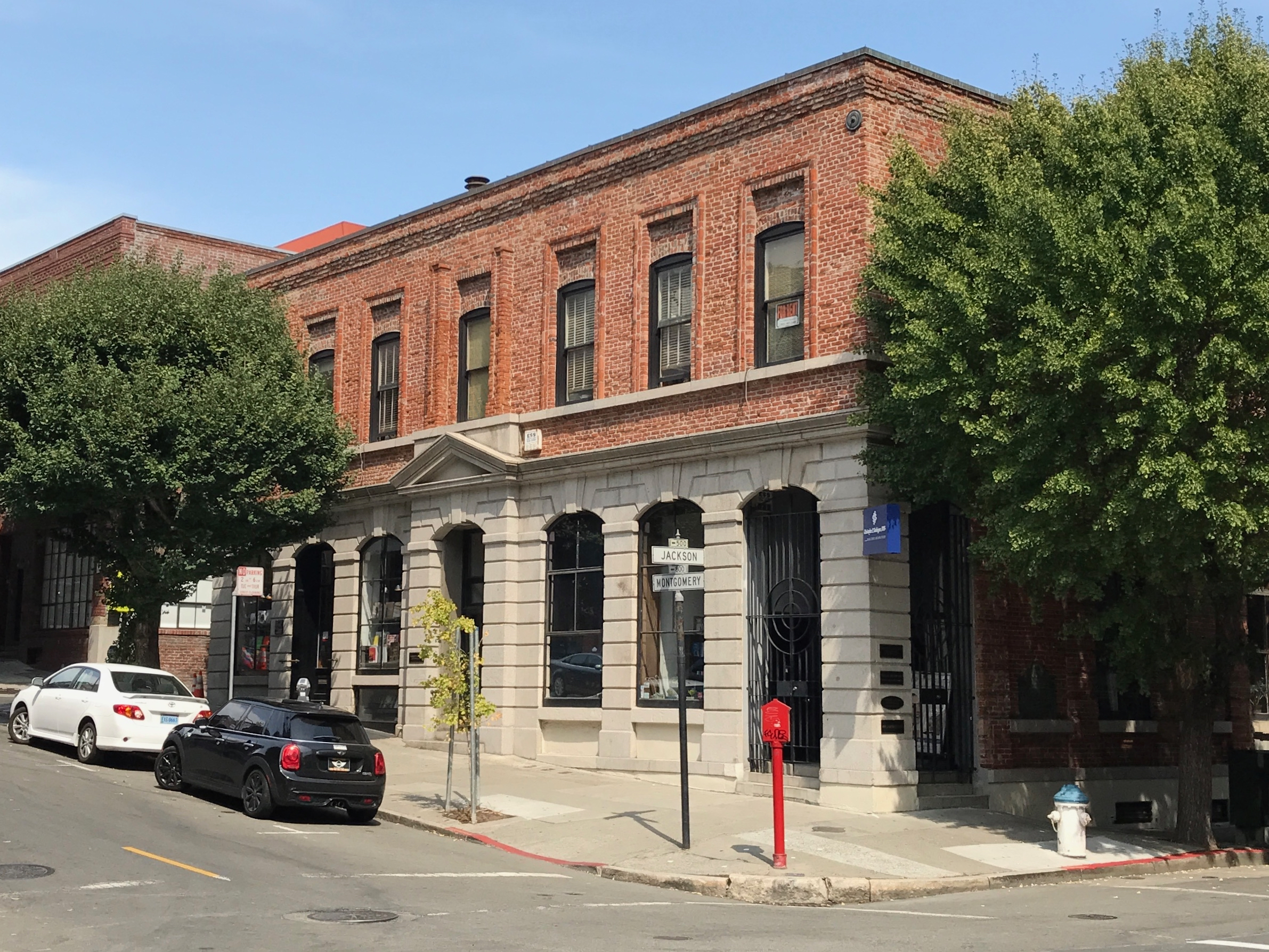
Site in 2017

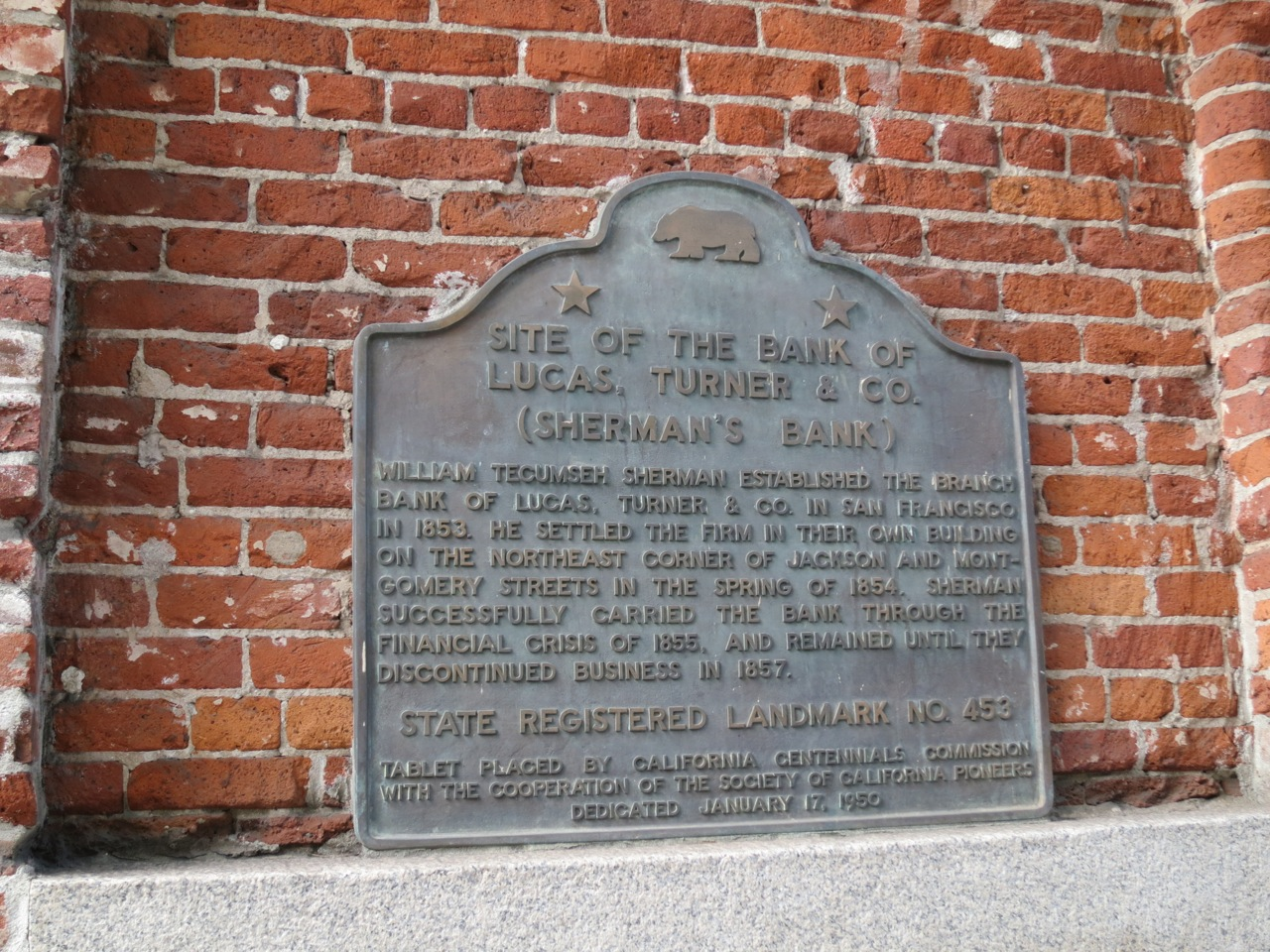
California Registered Historic Landmark plaque.

The Bank of Lucas, Turner & Company, also known as Sherman's Bank, is a historic building that was formerly a bank building, located at 800–804 Montgomery Street in Jackson Square in San Francisco, California.

The building is listed as a California Historical Landmark since November 11, 1950; and listed as a San Francisco Designated Landmark since March 16, 1970.

== History ==
The bank was built in 1853 by William Tecumseh Sherman, who later served as the manager of the bank. The building was designed by architect Reuben Clark in the Italianate style. The structure was originally constructed with three stories, after being damaged from the 1906 San Francisco earthquake and fire, they rebuilt building with only two stories. All that remained after the 1906 earthquake was the granite facade on the first floor (west wall).

The Bank of Lucas, Turner & Company bank was operational from 1854 until 1857, when they went bankrupt. From 1906 until 1924, the building was occupied by a French restaurant named the Eiffel Tower, with lodging above. In the 1920s, a sausage factory occupied the building; followed by a soy sauce factory.
