= Diamond Heights, San Francisco =

Diamond Heights
- Neighborhood of San Francisco
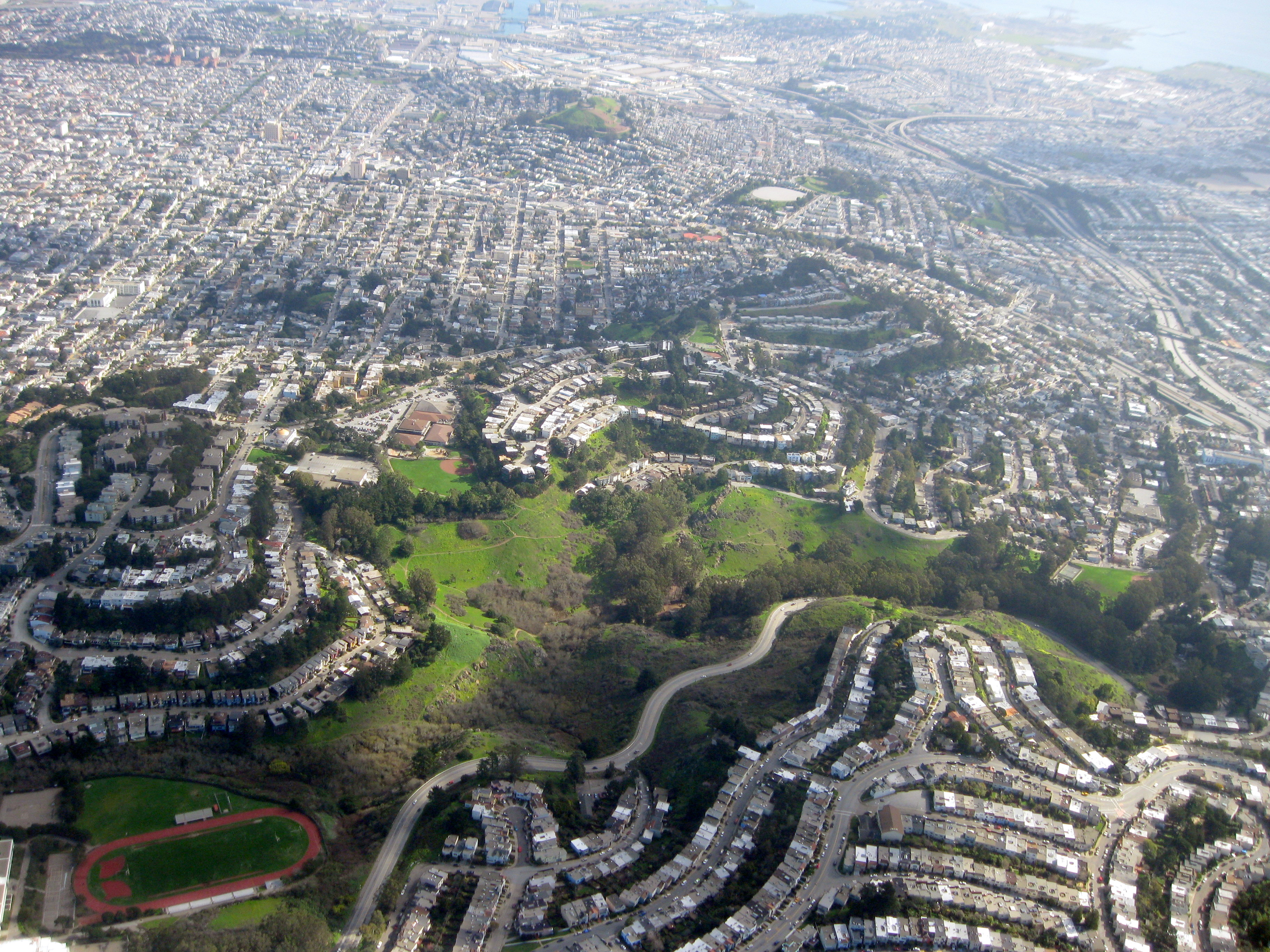
- Diamond Heights and Glen Canyon Park

- Location within Central San Francisco
- Coordinates: 37.7457639°N 122.4416379°W

Government
  - Supervisor: Rafael Mandelman
  - Assemblymember: Matt Haney (D)
  - State Senator: Scott Wiener (D)
  - U.S. House: Nancy Pelosi (D)

Area
  - Total: 1.13 km^{2} (0.436 sq mi)
  - Land: 1.13 km^{2} (0.436 sq mi)

Population
  - Total: 2,332
  - Density: 2,064/km^{2} (5,345/sq mi)
- 2008
- ZIP Code: 94131
- Area codes: 415/628

Diamond Heights is a neighborhood in central San Francisco, California. It is roughly bordered by Midtown Terrace to the north, across Portola Drive; Noe Valley to the east and Glen Park to the south, across Diamond Heights Boulevard; and Miraloma Park to the west, across O'Shaughnessy Boulevard. The neighborhood also includes a portion of Glen Canyon Park along its western edge. It is built on three hills: Red Rock Heights on the northwest, Gold Mine Hill in center, and Fairmount Heights (including Billy Goat Hill) on the southeast.

== History ==
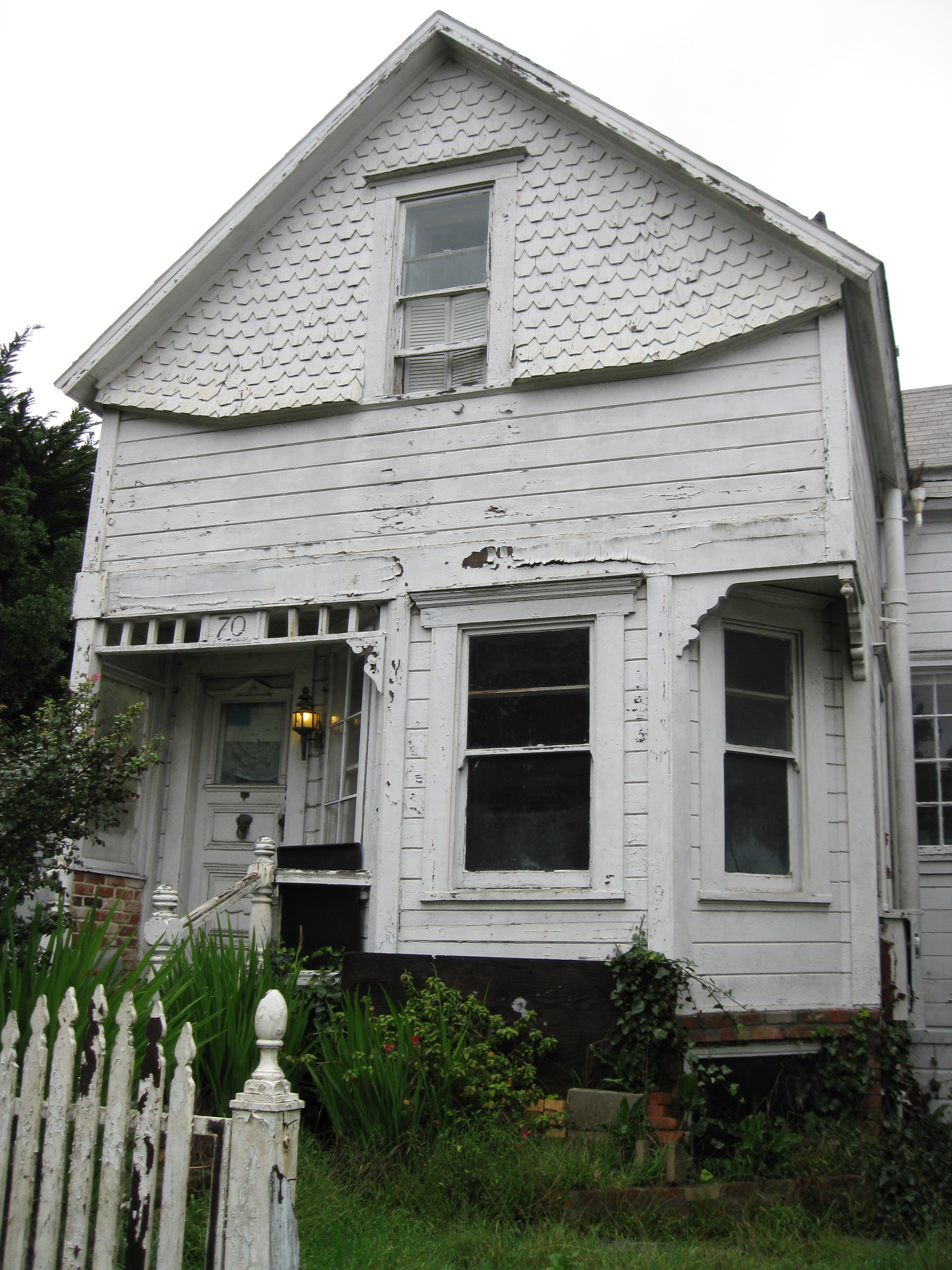
1895-built house on Gold Mine Drive

Diamond Heights was a San Francisco Redevelopment Agency project active from 1948 until 1978. It was also the first project of the San Francisco Planning and Urban Research Association, intended to use its redevelopment powers for land on the hills in the center of the city to be developed with, rather than against, the topography. Few existing residents needed to be relocated for the redevelopment program, which included housing for a range of incomes, churches, schools, parks, and a commercial center.

This type of redevelopment came under the Community Redevelopment Law, passed in 1951, a codified version of the California Redevelopment Act that had passed in 1941. Redevelopment in California ended on February 1, 2012, after the State Supreme Court ruled the Legislature could end the program on December 29, 2011.

The Water Department appropriated more than $500,000 for a water system for the redevelopment. The Board of Supervisors and Diamond Heights Property Owners' Association debated the "Diamond Heights Redevelopment Project Area B-1" plan. In 1955, alternative proposals to the supervisors' plan were presented in an effort to protect the property rights of existing property owners, and to give them preference to exchange their property for other sites. The Board rejected the motion to add these alternative plans to the legislation. The final plan was approved on October 24, 1955.

Some houses survived the redevelopment. A wood-frame house with separate garage stands at 70 Gold Mine Drive, just downhill from Diamond Heights Boulevard. According to the San Francisco Office of the Assessor, this house was built in 1895.

== Attractions and characteristics ==
Notable features of Diamond Heights include Diamond Heights Shopping Center on Diamond Heights Boulevard between Duncan Street and Gold Mine Drive and the San Francisco Police Department's police academy on Amber Drive between Turquoise Way and Duncan Street. St. Nicholas Orthodox Christian Church is at the top of Diamond Heights Boulevard, at the corner of Duncan Street. George Christopher Playground is located behind the shopping center, and Walter Haas Playground is at the intersection of Diamond Heights Boulevard and Addison Street.

Ruth Asawa School of the Arts high school is located in Diamond Heights, near the intersection of Portola Drive and Woodside Avenue. The San Francisco Juvenile Probation Department's Juvenile Justice Center lies northwest of the school, across Portola Drive.

Public transportation in Diamond Heights is provided by Muni's 35 Eureka, 48 Quintara/24th Street, and 52 Excelsior lines. All connect to the Muni Metro system; the 35 goes to Castro Street Station, the 48 goes to West Portal Station, and the 52 goes to Forest Hill Station. Additionally, the 35 and 52 connect to the Bay Area Rapid Transit system at the Glen Park Station.
