= Glen Park, San Francisco =

Glen Park
- Neighborhood of San Francisco
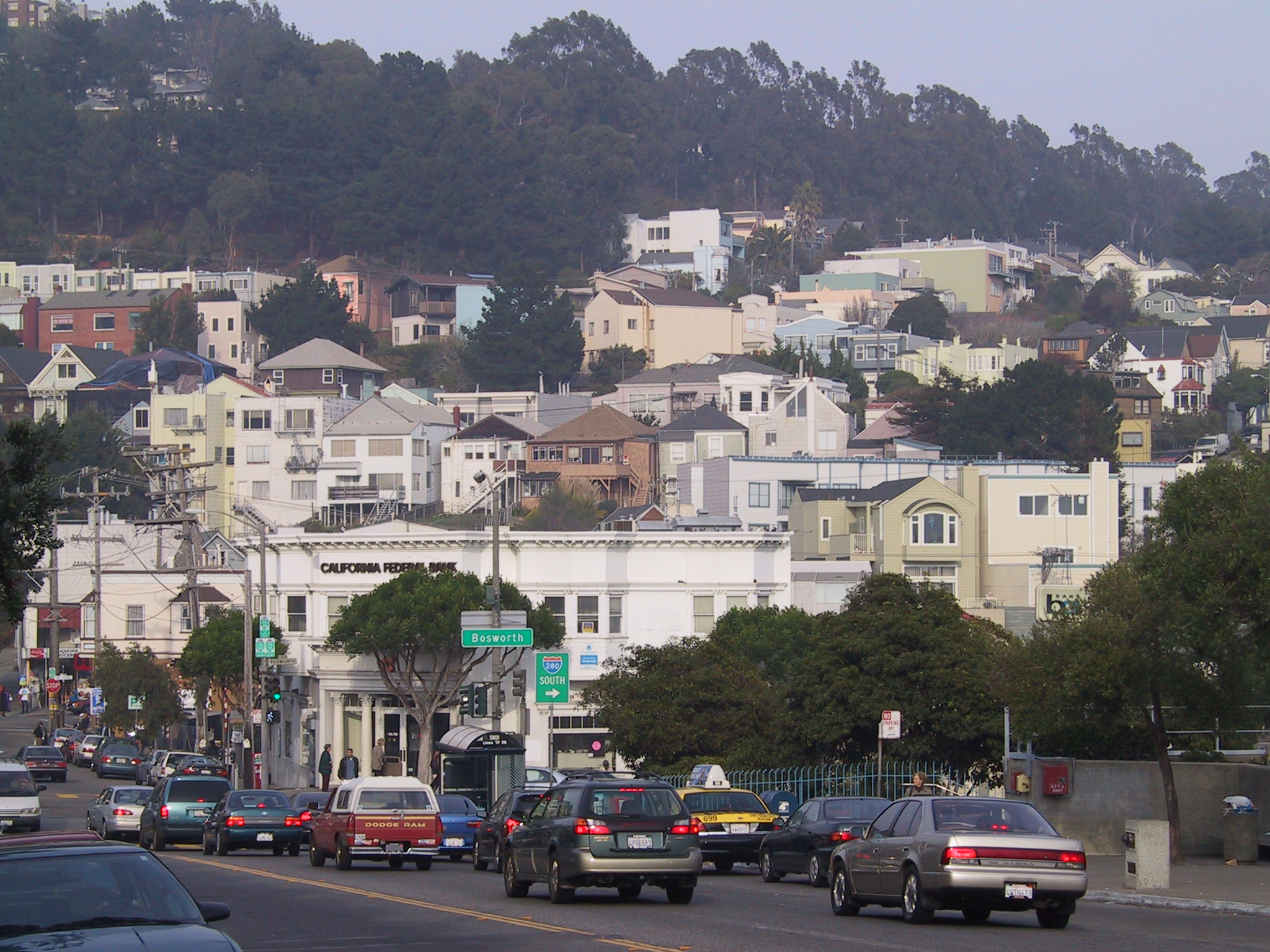
- View of Glen Park from Diamond Street by Bosworth Street.

- Location within San Francisco
- Coordinates: 37°44′02″N 122°26′00″W
- Country: United States
- State: California
- City-county: San Francisco

Government
  - Supervisor: Rafael Mandelman
  - Assemblymember: Matt Haney (D)
  - State Senator: Scott Wiener (D)
  - U. S. Rep.: Nancy Pelosi (D)

Area
  - Total: 0.485 sq mi (1.26 km^{2})
  - Land: 0.485 sq mi (1.26 km^{2})

Population (2008)
  - Total: 6,979
  - Density: 14,397/sq mi (5,559/km^{2})
- ZIP Code: 94131
- Area codes: 415/628

Glen Park is a residential neighborhood in San Francisco, California, located south of Twin Peaks and adjacent to Glen Canyon Park.

== Geography ==
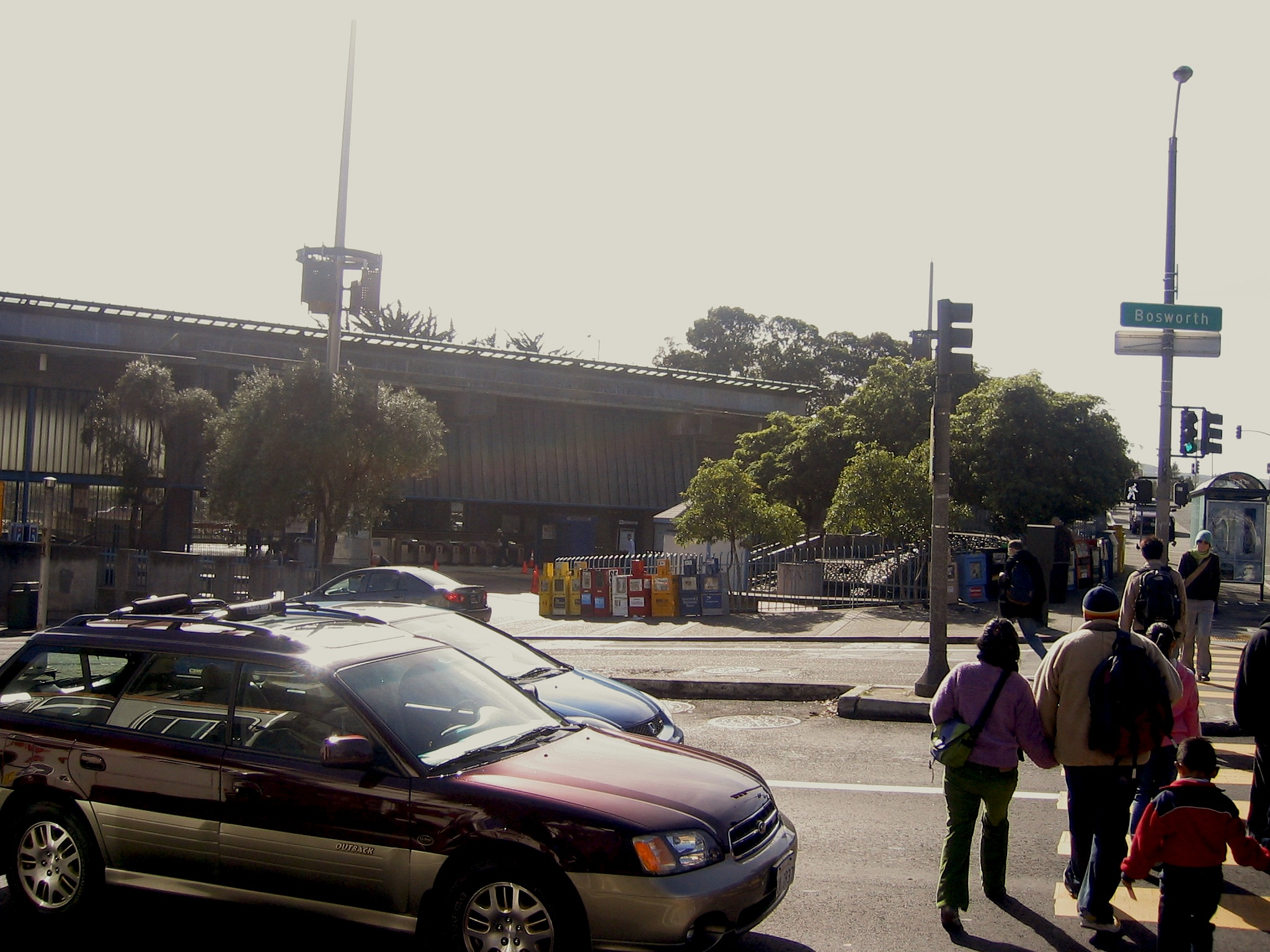
The Glen Park BART station at Bosworth

The neighborhood is nestled at the southeastern edge of San Francisco's central hills, the San Miguel Range. It includes Gold Mine Hill, a portion of Fairmount Hill to the east, Martha Hill to the south, as well as their southern- and eastern-facing slopes. The neighborhood's streets follow the hill's contours to a small commercial district ("the Village") at the intersection of Chenery and Diamond streets.

As defined by the San Francisco Planning Department, the neighborhood borders Diamond Heights to the northwest, along Diamond Heights Boulevard; Noe Valley to the north, along 30th Street; Bernal Heights to the east, along San Jose Avenue; and Outer Mission to the south, along Bosworth Street. (The San Francisco Association of Realtors draws a wider southwestern boundary and calls the adjacent neighborhood Sunnyside.) Historically, the area bordered by 30th Street, the peak of Fairmount Hill, Castro Street, and San Jose Avenue has been known as Fairmount Heights.

The Glen Park neighborhood consists of residential, commercial, and "public" city planning zones, specifically the following zones:

- One-Family (RH-1)
- One-Family Detached Dwellings (RH-1(D))
- Two-Family (RH-2)
- Residential Mixed, Low Density (RM-1)
- Public (P)
- Neighborhood Commercial Transit, Individual (NCT)
- Neighborhood Commercial, Small Scale (NC-2)

To the west, upper Islais Creek, historically the largest creek in San Francisco, still flows above ground through Glen Canyon from the southern slopes of Twin Peaks. It is only one of two San Francisco creeks (the other being Lobos Creek) to still do so. Today, Islais Creek flows into an underground culvert near the Glen Canyon Park Recreation Center, following its historic route through the Glen Park neighborhood parallel to Chenery and Bosworth (today under the Glen Park Greenway) on its way to San Francisco Bay. Organizations such as the San Francisco Planning and Urban Research Association have proposed to daylight it.

== History and characteristics ==
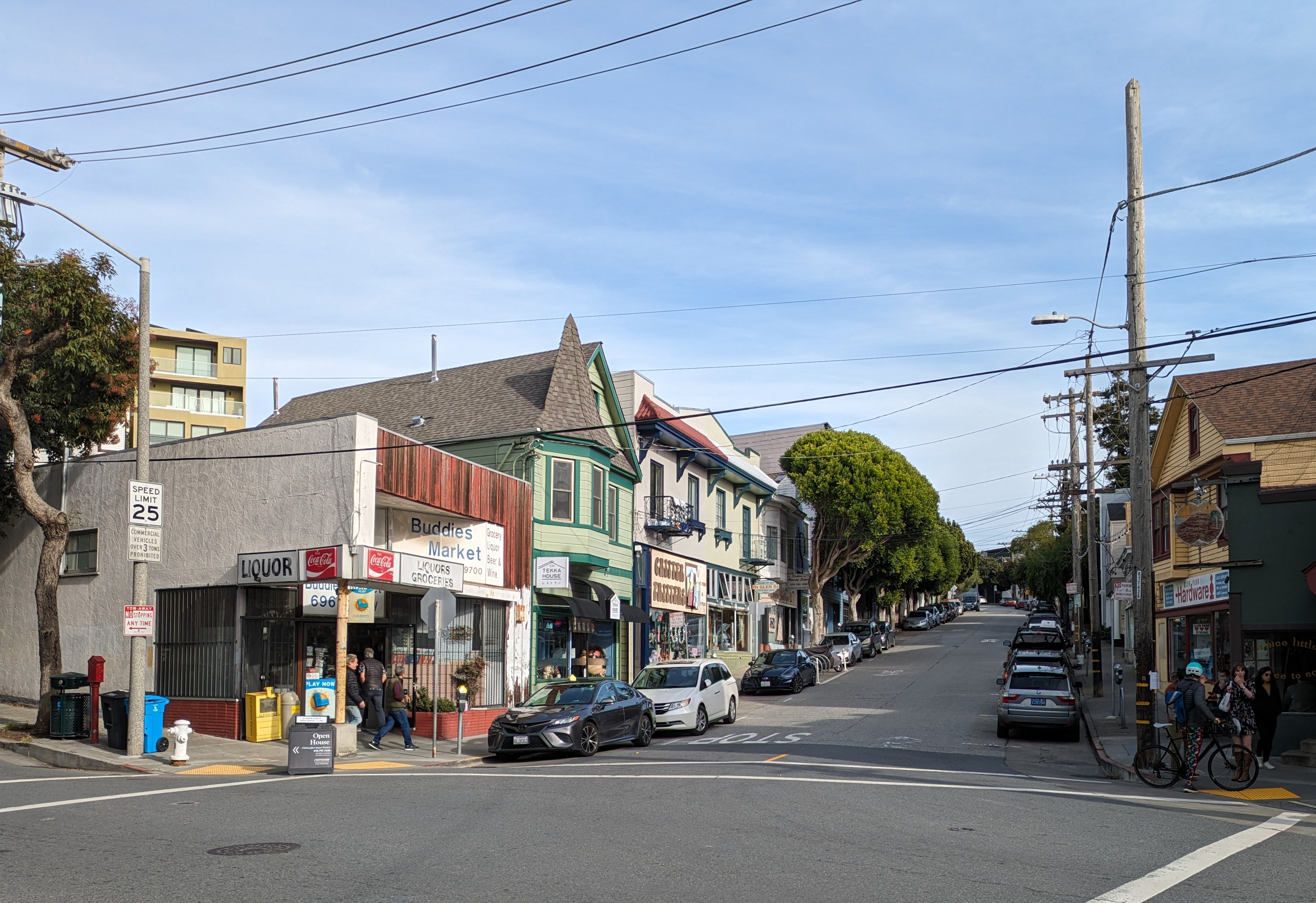
Glen Park

The first named streets in Glen Park were mapped in 1872 on land that had been occupied by milch rancher (i.e., dairy farmer) George Ulshofer as early as 1859 or 1860. The route of the Old San Jose Road through the district (also known as the El Camino Real) would become the future streets of Diamond and Chenery, so the route was already well known and well traveled.

In 1897, realtor Archibald S. Baldwin of the agency Baldwin & Howell had a plan for developing a new residential district. While the remote district had been made more accessible with the opening of the San Francisco and San Mateo Electric Railway in 1892 by Behrend Joost (to bring residents to his new Sunnyside residential district just to the south), Baldwin needed an enticement to attract potential buyers to the region. Baldwin owned some of the lands in the district and also managed adjacent lands for the Crocker Estate.

It was Baldwin who came up with the name of "Glen Park" for the district. The first use of “Glen Park” was when Baldwin announced the organization of the Glen Park Company in 1897, with the sole purpose of opening and managing a zoological gardens. His 145-acre pleasuring grounds and zoo became known as Glen Park and the Mission Zoo. Opening in 1898, it attracted 8,000 to 15,000 people each weekend for its vaudeville shows, daring aeronautic displays, sporting events, and animal exhibits. In 1899 with the pleasuring grounds a success, Baldwin began auctioning his home lots, Glen Park Terrace, located along Glen Avenue (today's Chenery Street between Diamond and Elk Streets). Because of difficulties encountered in the management of Glen Park and the Mission Zoo, as well as weak sales of Glen Park Terrace home lots, Baldwin divested all of his holdings in 1901, with much of the land being transferred to the California Title Company and the Crocker Estate. The Crocker Estate would continue to manage the main grounds of Glen Park and the Mission Zoo in today's Glen Canyon as a private picnic and pleasuring grounds until 1922, when the land was finally transferred to the City and County of San Francisco. They began releasing home lots surrounding Glen Canyon after the San Francisco Earthquake in 1906, when the population of Glen Park exploded with new residents who had been displaced by the catastrophe.

Transit through Glen Park began when the San Francisco and San Mateo Electric Railway opened access to southern areas of the city. Transit was improved further in 1916, when the SF & SM was acquired by the San Francisco Municipal Railway. A branch of the San Francisco Public Library opened in 1927. Today, transit is provided by the Glen Park BART station, the J Church line of the Muni Metro, and several Muni bus lines. Interstate 280 is also nearby.

Because of Glen Park's small size and mom and pop businesses, the neighborhood is sometimes described as having a village atmosphere. A multi-use, urban infill project opened in 2006, anchored by a natural foods grocery and a new branch library. Public spaces include Walter Haas Playground, Billy Goat Hill Park, and Fairmount Plaza.

== See also ==
- San Francisco Crosstown Trail
