= Glen Canyon Park =

Park in San Francisco, California, USA

Glen Canyon park
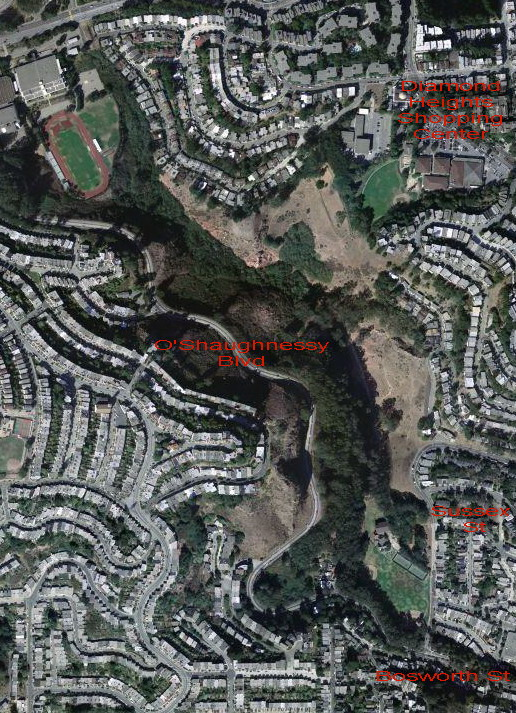
- Aerial photograph of Glen Canyon Park; the Bosworth St., Sussex St., and Diamond Heights Shopping Center entrances are labeled. O'Shaughnessy Blvd. divides Glen Canyon Park (on the east) from O'Shaughnessy Hollow (to the west).
- Interactive map of Glen Canyon park
- Type: Municipal (San Francisco)
- Location: San Francisco
- Coordinates: 37.739°N 122.442°W
- Area: 70 acres (0.28 km^{2}; 0.11 sq mi)
- Created: 1922
- Open: All year

California Historical Landmark
- Official name: Site of the first dynamite factory in the US
- Reference no.: 1002

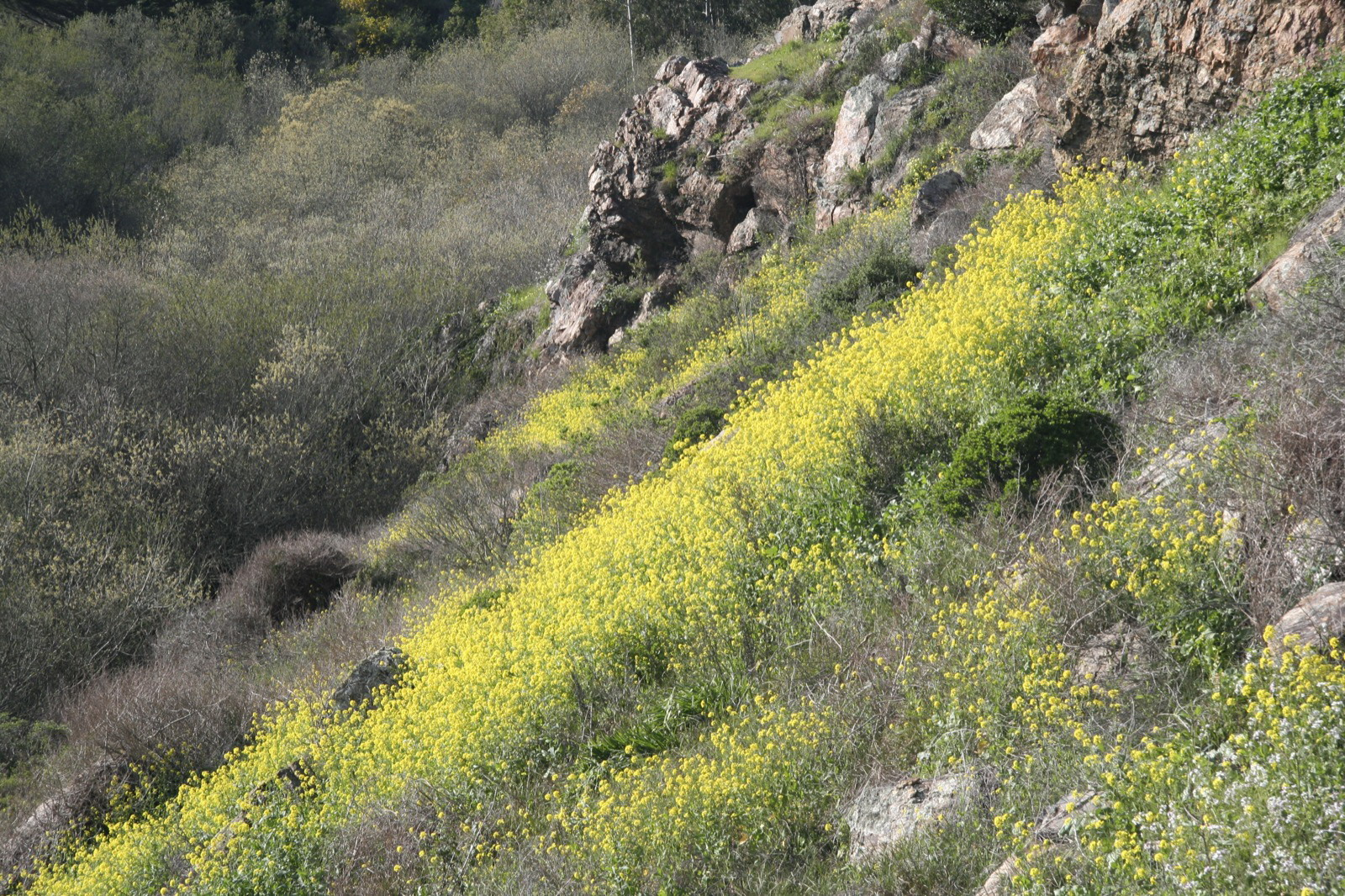
Spring in Glen Canyon Park. Field mustard in flower clings to the stony canyon walls; Islais Creek and its willow thickets lie at their base.

Glen Canyon Park in winter. The photograph shows three characteristic features of the park's landscape. The vividly green wild oat (Avena fatua) and slender wild oat (Avena barbata) grasses on the left cover the steep eastern slope of the canyon. The line of blue gum eucalyptus trees is a windbreak planted in the 1850s following Adolph Sutro's purchase of this land, which he named his "Gum Tree Ranch". The willow thickets in the bottom and bottom-right of the photograph surround Islais Creek and a small wetland; the wetland is traversed by a boardwalk leading to the trail seen emerging from the thicket.

Glen Canyon Park is a city park in San Francisco, California. It occupies about 70 acres (28 ha) along a deep canyon adjacent to the Glen Park, Diamond Heights, and Miraloma Park neighborhoods. O'Shaughnessy Hollow is a rugged, undeveloped 3.6 acres (1.5 ha) tract of parkland that lies immediately to the west and may be considered an extension of Glen Canyon Park.

The park and hollow offer an experience of San Francisco's diverse terrains as they appeared before the intense development of the region in the late 19th and the 20th centuries. The park incorporates free-flowing Islais Creek and the associated riparian habitat, an extensive grassland with adjoining trees that supports breeding pairs of red-tailed hawks and great horned owls, striking rock outcrops, and arid patches covered by "coastal scrub" plant communities. In all, about 63 acres (25 ha) of the park and hollow are designated as undeveloped Natural Area. Elevations in Glen Canyon Park range from approximately 225 feet (69 m) above sea level at the south end of the park to 575 feet (175 m) above sea level at the north end and along the eastern rim of the canyon; the walls of the canyon are extremely steep, with many slopes approaching a length-to-height ratio of 1:1 (100 percent).

Formal recreational facilities in Glen Canyon Park are mostly located at its southern end (see the aerial photograph). These facilities include a community recreation center, ball fields and tennis courts, playgrounds, and a ropes course. The park is also well used by local rock climbers, who consider it one of the best "bouldering" sites near San Francisco. An additional building about halfway up the canyon near Islais Creek serves the Silver Tree Day Camp and the Glenridge Cooperative Nursery School.

The park is easily entered at its southeastern corner (end of Bosworth Street). Somewhat further north, there is a wooden stairway leading down into the park (the Sussex Street entrance). There are also trails leading into the park from the Diamond Heights Shopping Center. Of one of these, Joseph Stubbs has written, "It is a dramatic, sudden revelation of the park interior from high up, which is simply stunning. It occurs midsection of the park behind Diamond Heights Shopping Center and George Christopher Playground."

== Islais Creek ==
A branch of Islais Creek (named after the wild cherry islay) originates in the canyon. It is the largest remaining creek in San Francisco with public access. The bottom of the canyon, where Islais Creek flows, is irregular but moderate in slope, dropping 350 feet (107 m) over a distance of about 1 mile (1.6 kilometer). The creek is surrounded by willow thickets. In earlier times, the creek had an open water channel sustained by a much larger water flow, and was "more of a river than a creek". Urban development has reduced the watershed of Islais Creek by as much as 80 percent. At the southern end of the canyon, Islais Creek enters a culvert which carries it to its exit into San Francisco Bay.

== Wildlife ==
The creek has a meager but year-round natural flow, and the water and resulting vegetation provide a habitat for animals, including skunks, opossums, raccoons, red-tailed hawks, red-shouldered hawks, great horned owls, coyotes, and the rare native San Francisco forktail damselfly, Ischnura gemina.

== Geology and rock outcrops ==
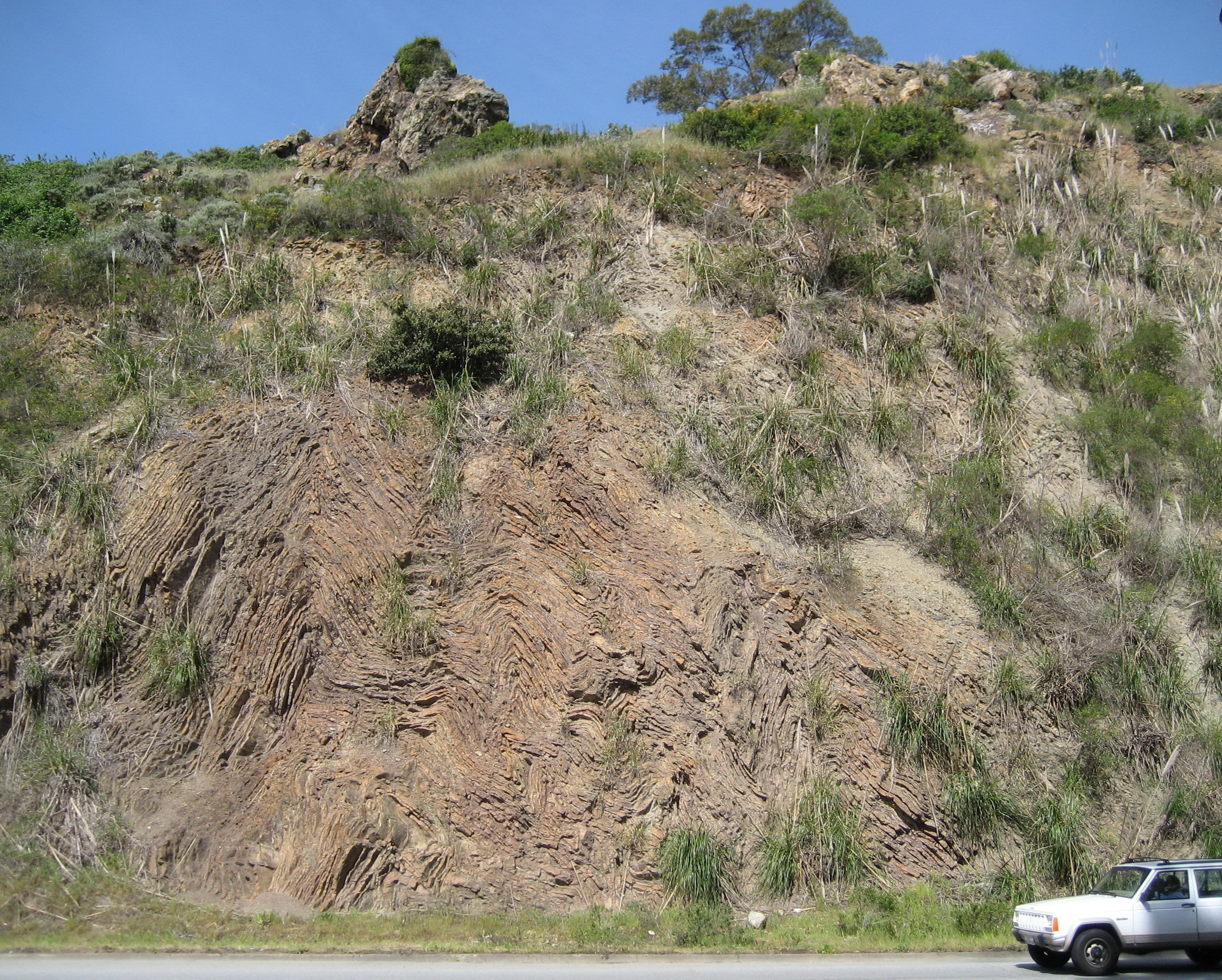
Roadcut showing Franciscan chert rock in O'Shaughnessy Hollow. The remarkable folding of the stacked layers indicates the tectonic forces that lifted up the coastal mountain ranges, and which warped the originally planar layers of this rock into the fantastic shapes they now present. The chert itself in this area is rich with fossils of radiolarian creatures. The land above and around the roadcut has a "coyote brush scrub" community of plants that is typically found on thinner, drier soils in this region. The road is O'Shaughnessy Boulevard, which was constructed around 1935.

The scenery of Glen Canyon Park is also distinguished by numerous large outcrops of rock. The most striking of these consist of reddish, layered "Franciscan" chert. These outcrops have clearly visible banding (see photo) which is due to the different weathering of the layers.

The bedrock of the canyon is made up of rocks of the Marin Headlands terrane. The terrane is a large packet of rock that extends diagonally from the Marin Headlands (just north of the Golden Gate), through the Twin Peaks and Glen Canyon area, and on to the southeast. This terrane is from 100 to 200 million years old (i.e. the Cretaceous and Jurassic periods). The bedrock of the lower slopes of the canyon - largely hidden under slope debris/ravine fill - is pillow lava or greenstone; these erupted from fissures in the deep ocean floor when the terrane was located hundreds of miles southwest of its present location.

The upper slopes and cliffs are of layered chert, which hardened into rock from the ooze of remains of countless radiolarian creatures that accumulated on top of the lava. The ooze was colored red by iron from hydrothermal springs. Both lava and chert were formed in the deep ocean near the equator, and were rafted northeast on the gradually-moving ocean floor toward California. Near shore, greywacke accumulated on the chert in some areas, including a small part of the southeast slope of Glen Canyon. Subduction then squeezed the terrane against the continent, and it eventually became part of the Franciscan formation that makes up much of coastal California. During subduction - 160 to 80 million years ago - and the subsequent uplift, the terrane was twisted, broken and disrupted, and the chert was deformed into the tight folds now visible in road cuts along O'Shaughnessy Boulevard (see photo).

These rock outcrops provide some of the best outdoor rock climbing in San Francisco, primarily in the form of bouldering.

== History ==
=== Sutro's Gum Tree Ranch ===
The park's history commences with Adolph Sutro's purchase in the 1850s of 76 acres (310,000 m^{2}) of the canyon, which he named "Gum Tree Ranch" after the blue gum eucalyptus trees he had planted.

=== Giant Powder Company ===
The first commercial manufacturing of dynamite in the U.S. occurred in the canyon; on March 19, 1868, the Giant Powder Company began production at its first manufacturing plant, under exclusive license from Alfred Nobel to produce his new explosive in America. The plant was apparently located near the present recreation center, at the southern end of the park. The factory did not last long. On November 26, 1869, an explosion completely destroyed the entire facility, turning every one of the buildings on the site and the surrounding fencing, into "hundreds of pieces", according to a newspaper account. Two people were killed, and nine injured; the plant was later rebuilt in the sand dunes south of Golden Gate Park. The site of the plant has been designated as California Historical Landmark #1002, and a commemorative plaque was placed at the site on August 17, 2017.

=== Dairy ===
The Good Brothers Dairy was located where Glenridge Cooperative Nursery School is today. Cows grazed as early as the 1850s, and likely earlier. The dairy remained until the 1920s.

=== The Crocker era ===
In 1889, the Crocker Real Estate Company bought the canyon to develop a neighborhood that would attract homebuyers. As Jeanne Alexander has written,

Crocker installed a mini-amusement park with an aviary, a mini-zoo--bears, elephants and monkeys, a bowling alley, and, for extra thrills, hot-air balloon rides, and an intrepid tight-rope walker who performed on a wire stretched across the canyon. From 1907-1922, Glen Canyon Park was operated as a picnic ground -- mainly for adults. Crocker Real Estate added tables and benches, a baseball diamond and a running track. It was fenced and rented to organizations for company picnics that often turned into boisterous drinking brawls. Neighborhood children had to find other places to play.

=== City park ===
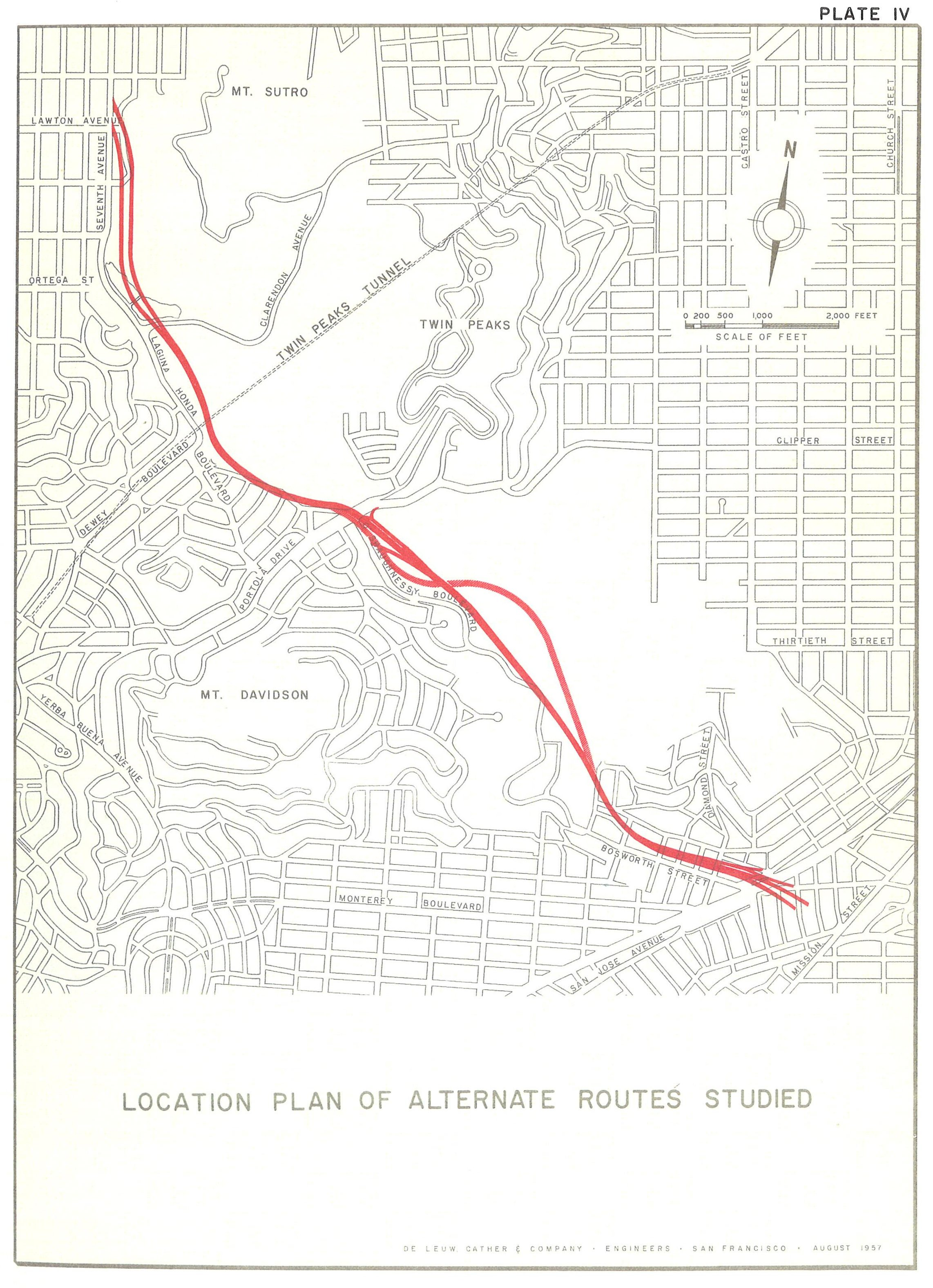
Map of Glen Canyon Park showing the route proposed in 1958 for the Crosstown Freeway. A citizen movement stopped freeway construction before it had reached Glen Canyon Park.

The Crocker era ended in 1922 when the City of San Francisco purchased the 101-acre (0.41 km^{2}) Glen Canyon Park and Recreation site. At present, O'Shaughnessy Boulevard defines the western perimeter of Glen Canyon Park. In conjunction with an extension of Bosworth Street, the Boulevard was built in 1935 using roadcuts and filled slopes on the canyon's steep slopes. It was named after Michael O'Shaughnessy, who was for many years the Chief Engineer of the city. The recreation center at the south end of the park was built by the Works Progress Administration in 1937.

In 1958, the California State Highway Department proposed a Crosstown Freeway that would have followed Bosworth Street through the neighborhood of Glen Park and then O'Shaughnessy Boulevard through Glen Canyon Park. The plan was abandoned due to opposition by several groups of residents. Six other freeways planned for San Francisco in the late 1940s were cancelled at about the same time; the conflicts over the freeway plan for San Francisco were among the earliest incidents in the Highway revolts in the United States of the 1960s and 1970s.

Six years later, in 1964, homes and businesses along Bosworth Street were demolished in order to greatly widen the section of the street leading to O'Shaughnessy Boulevard.

An undeveloped, very steep area just west of O'Shaughnessy Boulevard was acquired by the City of San Francisco in the 1990s using eminent domain. The area was being considered for residential development. The 3.6-acre parcel was named O'Shaughnessy Hollow.

== Future management ==
The city government of San Francisco mandated the development of management plans for all the "natural areas" under the city's control, and this process culminated in release of the Significant Natural Resources Areas Management Plan in February 2006. The plan favors the re-establishment of native species and species diversity in the city's parks. Some aspects of the plan have been controversial. For example, the plan envisions the removal of some large, mature trees (often eucalyptus, which was imported from Australia) to favor smaller native plants. The plan also includes new restrictions on recreational use of the park, such as the closure of some trails and of some areas for rock climbing, and prohibitions against unleashed dogs.

In Glen Canyon Park, about 20 mature eucalyptus trees were removed in 2004 as part of an effort to increase the diversity of species living along Islais Creek. The plan envisions the removal of an additional 120 trees (of the total of 6000 trees in the park) to further improve the creek, to increase the extent of the park's grasslands, and to promote forest understory plants. The plan also seeks to restore some open-water areas along the creek, which is nearly totally obscured by the willow thickets. The change in the creek would be established both by re-planting sections of the creek's banks with different plants and by the introduction of "scouring" structures.

Glen Canyon Park used to support populations of two rare species: the "vulnerable" San Francisco forktailed damselfly and the "endangered" Mission blue butterfly. The plan proposes changes in the management of the park that would promote self-sustaining populations of these insects. The damselfly population in the park was studied by John Hafernik and his colleagues in the 1980s prior to its local extinction; they re-introduced a population of these damselflies in 1996 that persisted for two seasons. The damselflies need open water habitat, which has proven difficult to maintain.

There has been a declining population of Mission blue butterflies at the nearly contiguous Twin Peaks Natural Area; while park employees logged about 150 butterflies in the 1980s, only four were found between 2001 and 2007. A reintroduction was done in April 2009. Reintroduction may also be possible in Glen Canyon Park. Here the main issue appears to be re-establishing the native plant "silver bush lupine", whose leaves are the larval food of these butterflies. A substantial fraction of Glen Canyon Park is now covered by non-native species including eucalyptus forest (17 acres), French broom (6 acres), and field mustard, but no specific proposal for re-introduction of the lupine was included in the Management Plan.

== Urban planning ==
The importance of Glen Canyon Park to its surrounding neighborhoods is indicated by a recent community plan for Glen Park that contains the following statement: "The Glen Park community's special character is created by the unique combination of eclectic building styles, pedestrian scale, the layering of green space and buildings climbing into the canyon, public spaces, walkable streets, a compact village, and proximity to transit and the canyon. Every new development project, whether public or private, must incorporate these features based on principles of good design and human scale."

A section of Bosworth Street connects the southern entrance to Glen Canyon Park with the central commercial district of Glen Park that lies about a third of a mile east. This section presents an important opportunity for urban design because the properties along the north side have remained undeveloped since their acquisition by the City in the 1950s. The community plan proposes that this land be developed into a greenway and pedestrian plaza. The plan also suggests that Islais Creek, which runs underneath this section of Bosworth Street, be "daylighted" in this section. The plan was formally endorsed by the San Francisco Planning Commission in 2004, but implementation has not been funded as of 2007.
