= Point Pinole Regional Shoreline =

Regional park in San Pablo Bay, California

Coordinates: 38.0060°N 122.3625°W

- Interactive map of Point Pinole Regional Shoreline
- Location: Contra Costa County, California, United States
- Nearest city: Richmond, California
- Area: 2,315 acres (9.37 km^{2})
- Created: 1973
- Operator: East Bay Regional Park District
- Status: Open

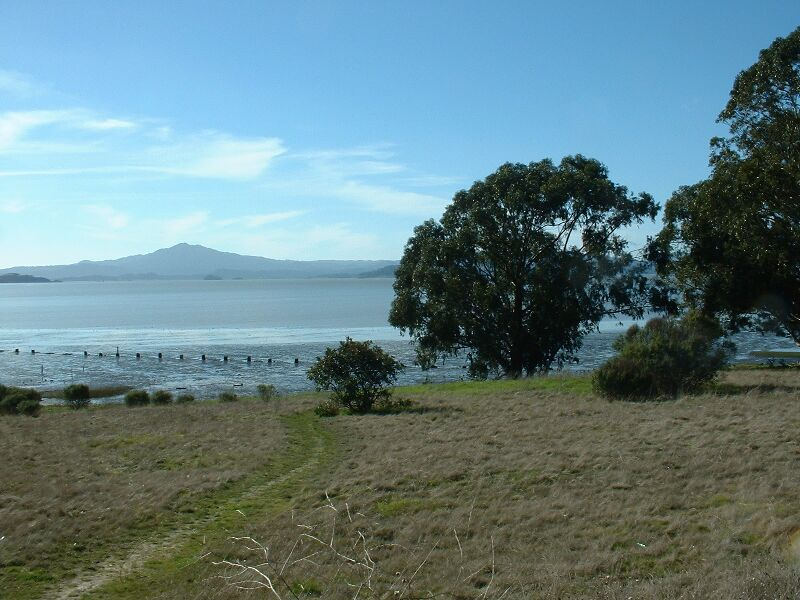
Mount Tamalpais from Point Pinole Regional Shoreline

Point Pinole Regional Shoreline is a regional park on the shores of the San Pablo Bay, California (the northern arm of the San Francisco Bay), in the United States. It is approximately 2,315 acres (9.37 km^{2}) in area, and is operated by the East Bay Regional Park District. It includes the Dotson Family Marsh (formerly Breuner Marsh) and the Point Pinole Lagoon and hosts the North Richmond Shoreline Festival.

== History ==
Point Pinole is located in the city of Richmond, California. It is on the site of a number of former explosives factories; the largest of these was operated by the Giant Powder Company, which was relocated to this relatively remote spot following accidental explosions at its former sites in San Francisco and at Albany Hill. Giant had built the first dynamite manufacturing plant in the United States at a site known as Glen Canyon Park, which started up on March 19, 1868. (Note: The process used was licensed by Alfred Nobel.) On November 26, 1869, there was an explosion that destroyed every building on the site (including the fence around the plant). The plant was forced to move farther away from heavily populated areas. Another explosion occurred at the Albany Hill plant in 1892, before Giant built its last plant in the lightly populated area of Pinole Point. Giant created a small unincorporated community, which it named Giant, California. Later, the Giant community became the established Croatian community of Sobrante.

Although the Point Pinole factory operated until 1960, when Bethlehem Steel Company acquired the property from Atlas Powder Company, little trace of it now remains. After several years, the East Bay Regional Park District acquired the property and opened Point Pinole to the public as a park in 1973. A plaque denotes the site as a California Historical Landmark. The facility's former tramway grades provide a network of nearly 20 kilometers (12 mi) of gently sloping paths for hiking, cycling and horse-riding. The other relic of the park's industrial past is the large number of eucalyptus glades groves which were planted around the factory site to buffer against potential explosions.

The park features the promontory of Point Pinole, located where the East Bay shoreline turns from running south towards Berkeley and Oakland to running eastwards, inland. Geologically, it is a result of movement on the Hayward Fault which runs along its western edge, creating a low scarp. It offers superb views across the bay in all directions, towards San Francisco to the southwest, Mount Tamalpais and the Marin Headlands to the northwest, inland across San Pablo Bay to the north and east, and Mt. Diablo inland to the southeast. Fresh and ocean waters mix at this point, so the marine life is rich; a leisure pier has been built at the end of promontory, replacing a former jetty used by the factories, and is a popular location for angling.

The parks trails are almost level allowing for easy walks. There is a $3 parking fee and a $2 per dog fee.

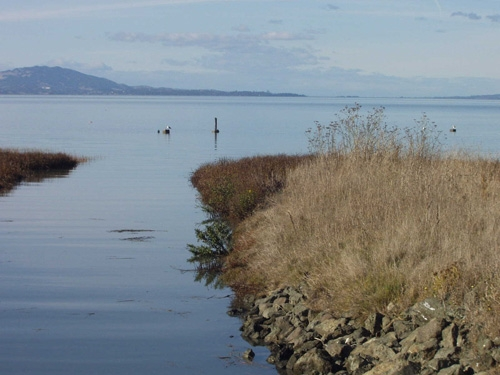
Breuner Marsh — San Pablo Bay and shoreline vegetation

In 2008 the park acquired the adjoining Breuner Marsh site and added it to the Point Pinole Regional Shoreline park. EBRPD renamed it the Dotson Family Marsh.

== Environment and wildlife ==
The park is a mixture of grassland and woodland, with beaches and low cliffs, and it has a particularly rich bird life, including many ducks and shorebirds, and the endangered black rail. It is located on the Pacific Flyway, so many migrant species are also seen. The marsh provides habitat for several creatures, including the Ridgway's rail and the salt marsh harvest mouse.

Whittell Marsh is the site of one of the few remaining Native American shellmounds in the San Francisco Bay Area.

The park is located on the Hayward Fault, whose exact position is marked by monuments erected by the United States Geological Survey. The USGS has a seismometer posted along the Union Pacific Railroad, which divides the park from the mainland; the park is reached via a bridge across the railroad.

The San Francisco Bay Trail runs through the park. The park can be reached by the AC Transit bus service, by car, or by bicycle. Pedestrian and cyclist admission is free, but there is a parking fee.

== Recent construction projects ==
=== Playground area ===
The playground at Point Pinole park was temporarily closed for construction from mid-August through October, 2017. During this time, the playground was resurfaced with wood fiber, equipment replaced with a net climber and a stand-up spinner, and a wheelchair-accessible path and picnic tables were added. All park paths remained open to the public during this work.

=== Atlas Road Bridge ===
On April 22, 2017, EBRPD dedicated the Atlas Road Bridge, a combination vehicle and wheelchair-compliant pedestrian bridge that connects to the San Francisco Bay Trail. This activity included building a new main entrance and parking area. The new entrance provides a bridge over active railroad tracks, which had been a hazard for pedestrians approaching the park from the parking lot. The project cost $11.7 million, which was largely funded by local bond Measure CC, the City of Richmond and grants from the following grantors:

- California State Parks
- California Natural Resources Agency
- Contra Costa Transportation Authority

The new bridge is part of a multi-phase project that will eventually lead to additional picnic areas, a new playground and the route to a new interpretive center for the park.

=== Dotson Family Marsh ===
At the same ceremony in April 2017, EBRPD also renamed and dedicated Breuner Marsh as the Dotson Family Marsh, honoring a family led by Reverend Richard Dotson, who had worked for many years to keep Breuner Marsh wild and open to the public, opposing several attempts to develop the tract for commercial ventures. (Note: The proposed projects included a small airport, a light industrial park and multiple versions of housing developments.) Rev. Dotson was able to organize residents of his own neighborhood in Richmond, Parchester, reminding them that the builder of their houses had promised they would always have access to the bay. He also recruited the Sierra Club as an influential ally in the three-decade legal fight against the developers. Dotson's group prevailed, and EBRPD acquires the marsh through eminent domain in March 2008. The district then attached the marsh to Point Pinole Regional Shoreline. (Note: Rev. Dotson's son, Whitney Dotson, is presently a member of the EBRPD Board of Directors.)

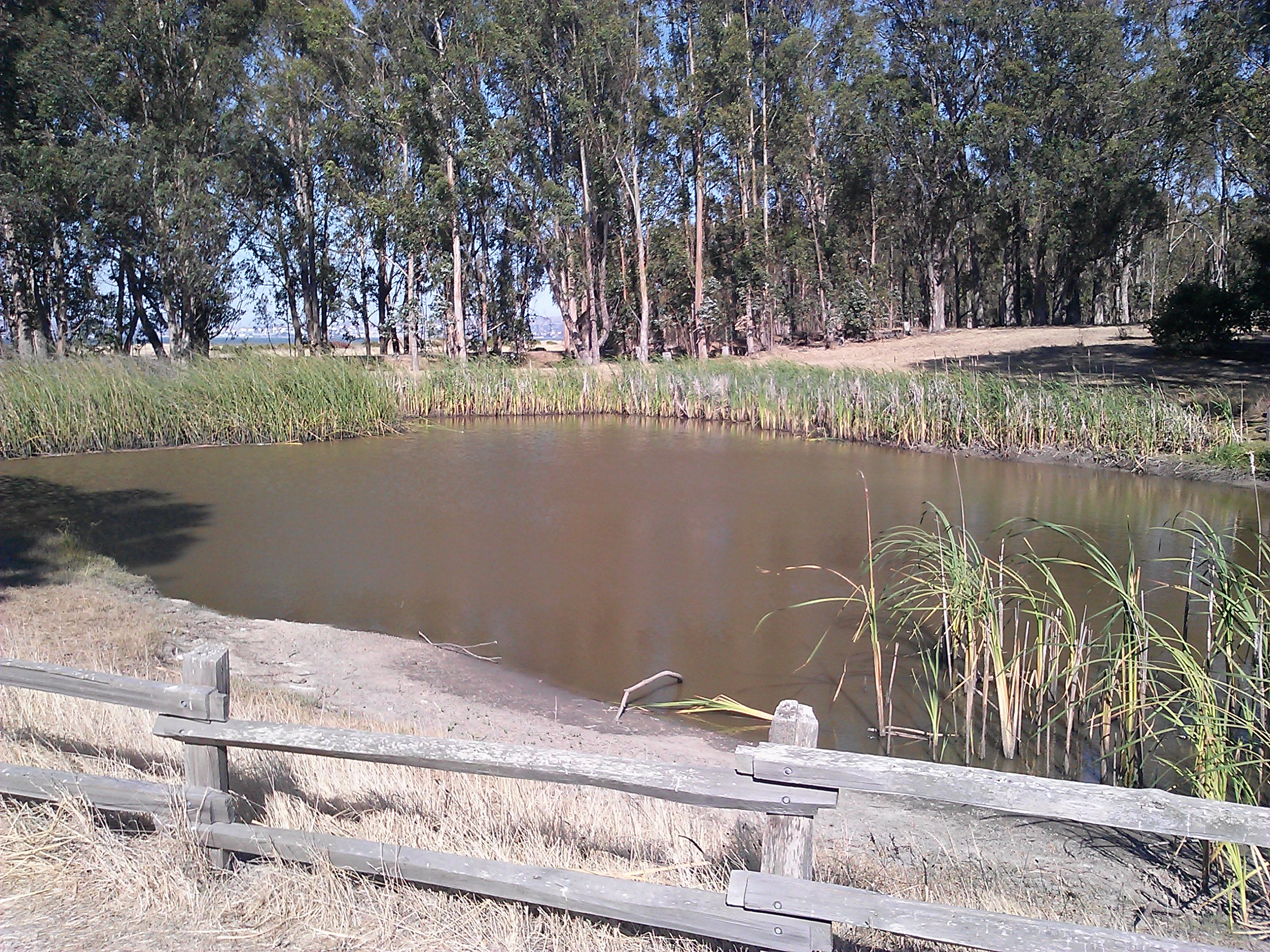
Point Pinole lagoon

=== Habitat restoration ===
The Dotson Marsh restoration project is intended to adapt the PPS to a self-sustaining wetland complex that will include filtering polluted run-off water. It also provides adaptations for anticipated sea level rise caused by climate change. The cost of restoration is estimated at $14 million, with at least 10 different entities providing funds.
