= Lucretia (disambiguation) =

Lucretia is a legendary figure in the history of the Roman Republic.

Lucretia may also refer to:

== Names ==
=== Given name ===
- Lucretia Longshore Blankenburg (1845–1937), American suffragist, reformer
- Lucretia Maria Davidson (1808–1825), American poet
- Lucretia Edwards (1916–2005), environmental activist and preservationist
- Lucretia Xavier Floyd (1860s–1925), Spanish-American translator, writer
- Lucretia Garfield (1832–1918), First Lady of the United States, wife of President James A. Garfield
- Lucretia Peabody Hale (1820–1900), American author
- Lucretia Mott (1793–1880), American Quaker minister, abolitionist, social reformer and proponent of women's rights
- Lucretia the Tumbler, a court jester in the court of Mary I of England

=== Family name ===
- Lucretia gens, a prominent family of the Roman Republic

=== Fictional characters ===
- Lucretia, a character from the television series Spartacus

== Paintings ==
- Lucretia (Artemisia Gentileschi, Los Angeles), Getty Museum
- Lucretia (Artemisia Gentileschi, Milan), private collection
- Lucretia (Artemisia Gentileschi, Potsdam), Neues Palais
- Lucretia (Casali), c. 1750
- Lucretia (Parmigianino), 1540
- Lucretia (Raphael), 1500s
- Lucretia (Rembrandt, 1666)
- Lucretia (Veronese), c. 1585

== Music ==
- Lucretia My Reflection, a song by The Sisters of Mercy, taken from the 1987 album Floodland
- "Lucretia MacEvil", a song from the album Blood, Sweat & Tears 3
- "Lucretia's Reprise", a song from the album Blood, Sweat & Tears 3
- "Lucretia", a song from the album Rust in Peace

== Other uses ==
- Lucretia, West Virginia, a community in the United States
- 281 Lucretia, an 11km diameter asteroid in the Main Belt
- Tropical Storm Lucretia, a 1950 tropical storm

== See also ==
- Lucrezia (disambiguation), including Lucrecia
- Lucretius (c. 99 BC–c. 55 BC), Roman poet and philosopher
