= Kaiser Oakland Medical Center =

Coordinates: 37°49′31″N 122°15′31″W

- Kaiser Permanente

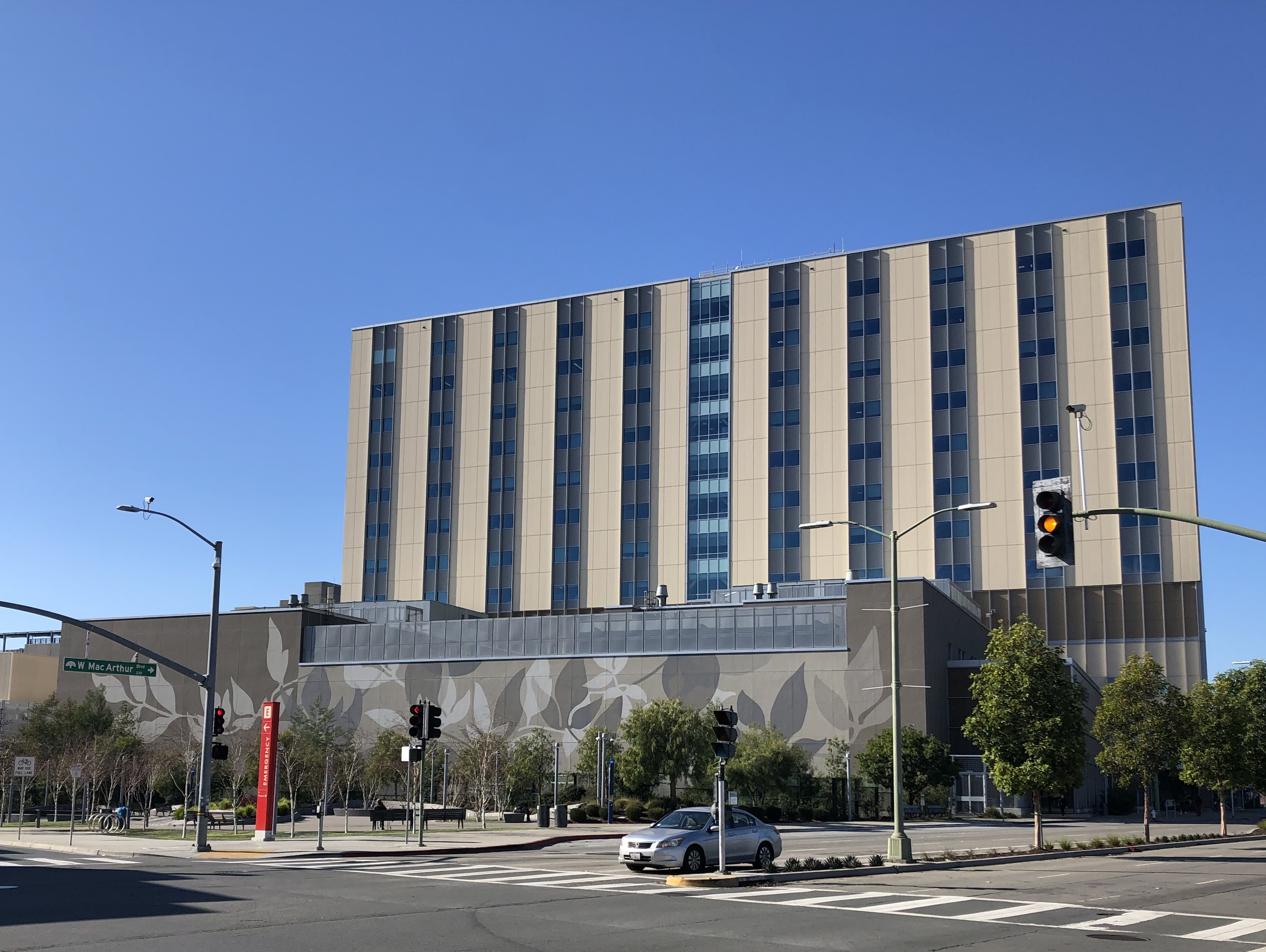

Geography
- Location: 3600 Broadway, Oakland, California, United States

Organization
- Care system: Non-profit HMO
- Affiliated university: UC Berkeley, Mills College

History
- Founded: 1942

Links
- Lists: Hospitals in California

Kaiser Oakland Medical Center is a hospital in Oakland, California. It is located at the intersection of Broadway and West MacArthur Boulevard, immediately north of Downtown. It is the flagship hospital of Kaiser Permanente, the largest managed care organization in the United States, through its Kaiser Foundation Hospitals division.

== History ==
The Oakland Medical Center was the first of the Kaiser Permanente hospitals, and opened in 1942 as a result of the acquisition of the Fabiola charity hospital (which operated from 1887 to 1932 before being sold to Samuel Merritt Hospital) by the Permanente Foundation, founded by industrialist Henry J. Kaiser and physician Sidney Garfield. This was the first modern Health maintenance organization (HMO) hospital after the experiment of using an HMO model was found to be successful among the 90,000 Richmond Kaiser Shipyards workers in the Richmond, California, Field Hospital. Several additions and renovations followed over the decades, notably a signature 12-story, 420-bed tower which opened in September 1972.

Vice President Kamala Harris was born at Oakland Medical Center in 1964.

== New flagship facility ==
To meet California's updated earthquake safety standards, the Oakland Medical Center was replaced in stages. First, a new parking garage opened in 2011. This was followed by a new twelve-story, 349-bed full service hospital across the street from the old facility. The new hospital is on the site of the MacArthur/Broadway indoor shopping center, opened in 1965 and demolished in 2009. The new Oakland Medical Center features twelve inpatient operating rooms, six outpatient operating rooms and seven outpatient procedure rooms, eight delivery rooms, and an emergency department. There are single occupancy rooms only (previously, patients shared rooms). Every patient has a private room with room service, free Wi-Fi access and a pull-out guest bed. A 42-inch flat-screen monitor in each room allows patients to watch TV, and also to look up the names of doctors and nurses, have a remote conversation with an interpreter and see their treatment plan. The hospital building is complemented with a four-story medical office building hosting ninety-nine provider offices. These additional buildings opened in July 2014; the Oakland Medical Center, the flagship facility of the entire Kaiser Permanente system, is one of three new Kaiser hospitals that began operating that year. A new hospital in suburban San Leandro opened in June, and the Redwood City medical center opened in December.

== University partnerships ==
The Oakland Medical Center maintains a relationship with the Tang Center, the UC Berkeley student clinic for medical needs outside the scope of the Tang Center's episodic medicine capabilities. Furthermore Mills College has a similar relationship with Kaiser Oakland. The Mills student health center hosts a Kaiser doctor and nurse. All Mills students are able to access all of Oakland Medical Center's services in addition to any other Kaiser campus.

== Transportation ==
The hospital has its own weekday shuttle service (the Kaiser Shuttle) that connects several hospital facilities with the nearby MacArthur BART station, in addition to being directly served by several AC Transit bus lines.

== Events ==
The hospital hosts a farmers market every Friday morning.

== Controversies ==
=== 1997 under staffing violations ===
In 1997 when deaths at the neighboring Kaiser Richmond led to the closure of its ER for ambulance patients, Oakland Medical Center had to bear the brunt of the extra patients. In fact, the entire health organization could have lost millions in funding if it did not immediately remediate the chronic understaffing of critical care positions at this hospital.

=== 2011 home hospice care violations ===
In 2011 the hospital was probed in a "scathing" report that described the hospital as having systemic deficiencies that put its patrons in "immediate jeopardy" in its home health division for terminally ill patients. Kaiser was also accused of scapegoating nurses for the problems as a diversion of responsibility. It opened this division in 1989 and has received complaints for years, although these are the first serious violations. The nurses say the problems stem from budget cuts, understaffing, and increased regulations. The nurses have described the patient record keeping as "deplorable".

Moreover, due to the conditions the Health Care Financing Administration has threatened to cut Kaiser's $700,000 Medicare disbursement. The HCFA cited patient care violations such as misdiagnoses and medication delays. Kaiser responded with a 90-day plan to fix the issues. The hospital is required to provide 24-hour care but this service especially the nurse advice line has been described as "shoddy". Nurses report that although Kaiser acts to fix problems quickly, it chooses temporary fixes over long-term solutions to bigger problems in a routine fashion. The San Francisco Chronicle reported that once investigators leave "it all goes down the tubes again" and that management changes the charting system monthly causing distress for the employees. It has also been reported that staff have been banned from charting anything that could arouse the suspicions of inspectors such as medical record errors and that some workers had been written up for doing so. Kaiser's spokesperson reported that morale is low and the medical facility is undergoing "tough" and "turbulent" times.
