= Kaiser Richmond Medical Center =

Coordinates: 37.93729°N 122.36028°W

- Kaiser Permanente

- Richmond Medical Center in downtown Richmond, California

Geography
- Location: 901 Nevin Avenue, Richmond, California, United States

History
- Founded: 1942

Links
- Website: Richmond Medical Center
- Lists: Hospitals in California

Kaiser Richmond Medical Center is a large Kaiser Permanente hospital in downtown Richmond, California which serves 77,000 members registered under its medical plans. It opened in 1995 replacing the historic 1942 Richmond Field Hospital that serviced Liberty shipyard workers and thus gave birth to the HMO. However it was deemed seismically unsafe and this new campus was built.

== History ==
=== Richmond Field Hospital, 1942 ===
The current facility was built to replace an aging World War II era field hospital. The Kaiser Richmond Field Hospital opened in 1942 to serve workers at the Richmond Shipyards who had signed up for the "Kaiser Plan", one of the first voluntary prepaid health plans and a direct precursor to the modern Health Maintenance Organization (HMO). The original hospital closed in 1995. Along with the entire neighborhood of Atchison Village, it is now on the National Register of Historic Places and is part of Rosie the Riveter/World War II Home Front National Historical Park.

=== Current facility, 1995 ===
The current facility was built during the early 1990s at a cost of $50 million, and opened in 1995.

The hospital was originally one pavilion, but was expanded to three in the 1990s, including upgrading to a full hospital service including surgery and emergency. The hospital portion underwent further expansion in 2006. The hospital described as having "state-of-the-art" facilities upon opening has several ghost wards of that caliber. It was built with a fully operational intensive care unit that has never been opened or used in addition to several other inactive pavilions. The smaller field hospital had in fact maintained an ICU for this city until that point. In 1997 the hospital stopped admitting patients overnight due to the fact that it only filled on average 20 of the 50 spaces in its overnight ward. In 1998 hundreds of doctors, nurses, patients, and hospital members and users protested at Richmond Civic Center for the hospital to actually operate the full service emergency room that it was built for. Advances in surgical techniques and medical practices in addition to cost cutting efficiency measures led to a dramatic decrease in hospitalizations in the 1990s from what had been forecast for the campus. This led the hospital to try and lease some of its excess space and departments to Brookside Hospital, Doctors Medical Center Pinole, and the county hospital in Martinez. In 1996 a home care division that sends nurses to the residences of terminally ill patients was added.

The facility routinely receives victims of Richmond's industrial environmental catastrophes such as the General Chemical Company and PBE Polymers explosions or Chevron Richmond Refinery spills. The Fire Chief is Jim Fajardo. In such situations the Richmond Fire Department orders a shelter in place order, emergency warning sirens sound and dozens to hundreds are hospitalized here. They are often brought by commandeered AC Transit buses.

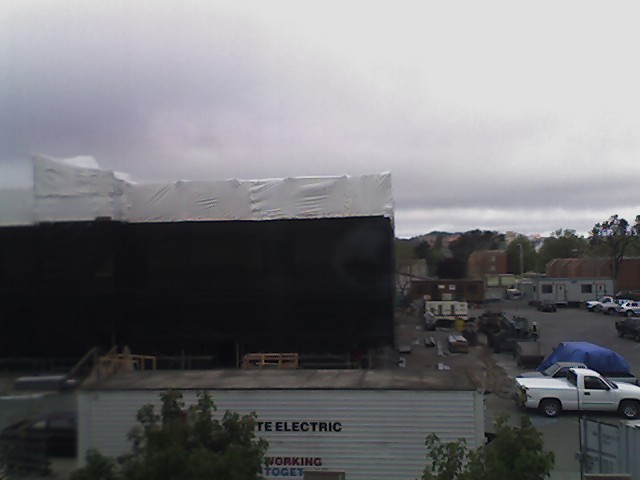
Hospital expansion in 2006.

=== Recognition ===
Based on several metrics of excellence it was recognized as a top hospital in 2023.

== Facilities ==
Richmond Medical Center has 41 departments and services offered to its members.

=== Emergency services ===
The hospital offers basic 24-hour emergency medical services. There is also some emergency surgery performed here, but most are forwarded to Kaiser Oakland or John Muir Medical Center hospitals.

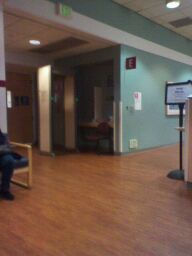
Due to high crime the emergency department employs metal detector screening of most patients and visitors.

=== Special services ===
Richmond Medical Center has Benefits Advocacy and Social Services departments to assist those with the state funded Medi-Cal health plan. This is a health coverage for those who are on welfare, poor, disabled, and seniors. The department assists patients to access their benefits and navigate applications and appeals.

The hospital offers specialty services in transgender care.

Richmond Medical Center offers Health Education workshops to educate their members about healthy lifestyles. There is a Breast Health Clinic. The hospital has a dedicated HIV services unit to assist patients who are HIV-positive. Home Health Care and Chronic Conditions departments provide advice on home care those with chronic conditions such as dementia, asthma, diabetes, or epilepsy, and also helps people with common afflictions such as seasonal allergies or influenza. There is a Respiratory Care department which is dedicated specifically to those with asthma, an illness which has a high incidence in Richmond. The rehabilitation department oversees physical therapy for those who have suffered severe injuries or amputations. There is an occupational health department which is dedicated to educating and treating patients with work related injuries. There is a speech therapy department which assists autistic children. The medical center has a teen clinic where adolescents may attend without the accompaniment or consent of an adult and without going to Pediatrics; it has a focus on sexual health and substance use. That unit works with the chemical dependency department which provides health care for those with addictions and recreational use of various narcotics such as alcohol, marijuana, prescription abuse, crack cocaine, and others. Toddlers are taken to the Early Start unit which provides motor skills and cognitive development and disease screening and offers classes for parents.

The hospital performs bariatric surgery and head and neck surgery on top of standard surgery.

=== Regular services ===
The hospital's standard departments and services are: Allergy, Gastroenterology, Pathology, Pediatrics, Cardiology, Podiatry, Hospitalists, Psychiatry, Radiology, Dermatology, Medicine, Dietician, Outpatient Services, Neurology, Obstetrics and Gynecology, Otolaryngology, Oncology, Eye Clinic, and Orthopedics.

Richmond Medical Center has three on-site pharmacies and an on-site laboratory.

The hospital is located in Downtown Richmond and is accessible by AC Transit and Golden Gate Transit buses and on foot or via the free Kaiser Shuttle from the Richmond BART/Amtrak. Free parking is provided to visitors at a connected garage.

== Controversies ==
=== 1997 Patient deaths ===
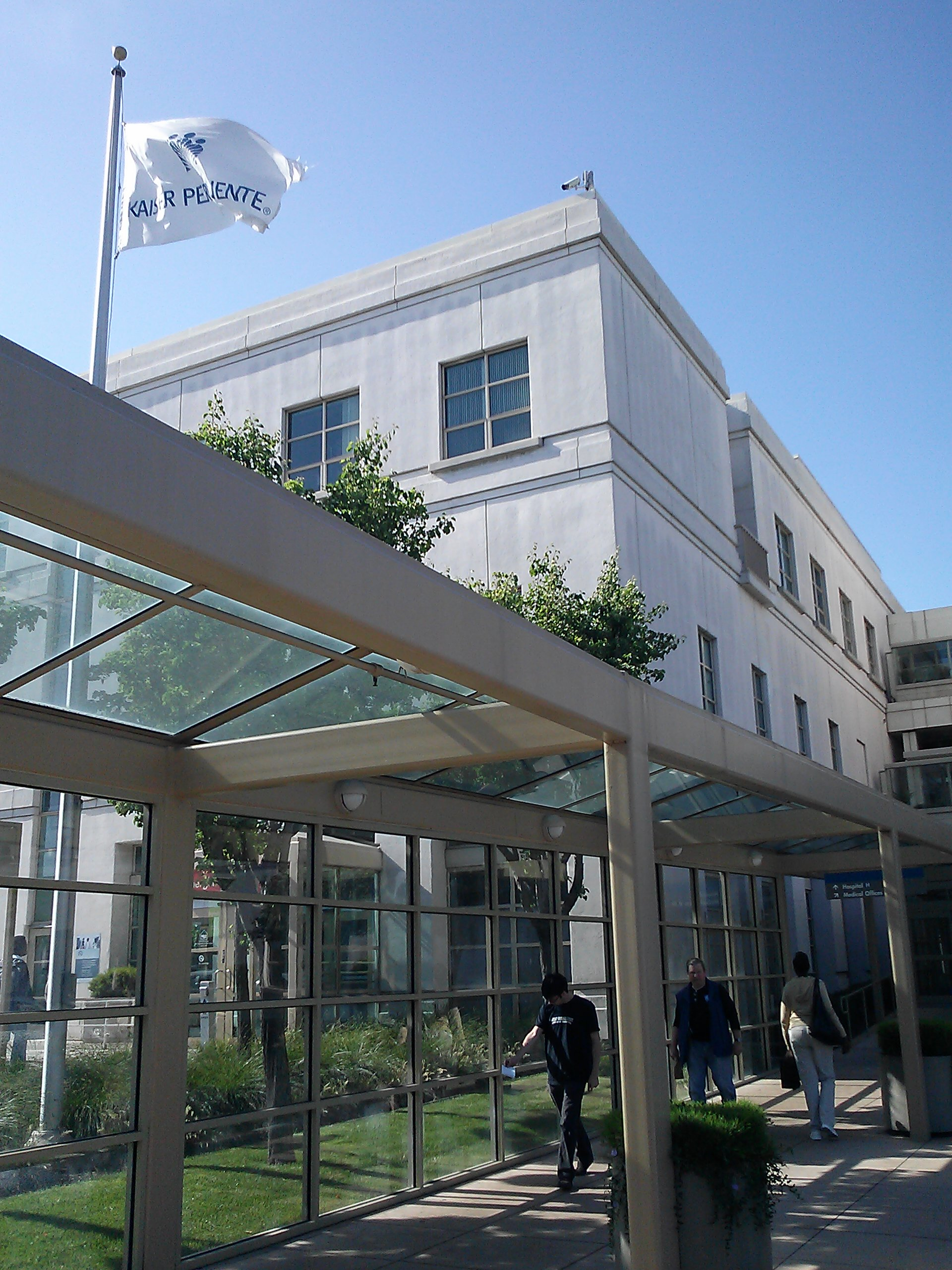
Main hospital entrance and parking path canopy

In April 1997 the hospital was chastised by federal investigators from the United States Health Care Financing Administration for several patient deaths and dangerous understaffing, among a 104 total violations. The deaths were investigated by the California Department of Health Services on behalf of the USHCFA and were found to be the fault of the hospital. In fact the California Nurses Association had already reported repeatedly and to no avail that the hospitals were understaffed especially for critical care positions. Kaiser claimed the nurses' complaints were motivated based on Kaiser's plan to reduce their salary and benefits, while the CNA contended they had been complaining for at least 2 years before their labor disagreement came into play. Richmond Medical Center was also censured for sending patients to other hospitals via their own cars and not ambulances, even if they were alone and in labor, as a common practice. Further violations for the hospital that were described by investigators and itself as "deficient" including poor recordkeeping, no standardized nor documented procedures, and understaffing of nurses in the emergency department.

The deficiencies nearly led to Kaiser Permanente's losing its Medicare rating and therefore $2.9 billion in funding systemwide. During the investigation the hospital had to stop admitting ER patients and was forced to send them to the next closest hospitals Doctors Medical Center in San Pablo and Kaiser Oakland. When conditions warrant, patients are routinely sent to Children's Hospital Oakland, John Muir, or Kaiser Oakland. Nineteen more nurses were hired and staffing of critical positions was increased. Another step taken was an agreement for Brookside Hospital to accept an average of three critically ill patients daily. It had been identified as a flaw that RMC had no agreement with another hospital to take in these patients, and in fact some died waiting for, or during transport to other hospitals. In May 1997 the hospital and the health care organization were able to convince the government to reverse the decision after launching remediation actions at Kaiser Richmond and its mother campus in Oakland.

=== 2011 home care violations ===
In 2011, Kaiser was described in a "scathing" report for having its terminally ill patients in home care, in immediate jeopardy due to serious violations in care. Three nurses including one from the Richmond division were scapegoated by Kaiser according to the government, that did not believe it to be anyone's fault but the organization itself.
