= Lucrezia =

Lucrezia or Lucrecia may refer to:

- Lucrezia (given name): an Italian name, feminine of the Roman name Lucretius. The etymological origin of the name is debatable, but is thought to come from the Latin lucrum, meaning "profit, wealth". Other sources believe it may be of Etruscan origin, though its original meaning has been lost.

== People ==
- Lucrezia (singer), Italian singer
- Lucrecia (singer), Cuban singer
- Lucrezia Aguiari, Italian coloratura soprano
- Lucrezia d'Alagno (1430–1479), close acquaintance of Alfonso V of Aragon
- Lucrezia Borgia (1480–1519), the daughter of Rodrigo Borgia, who became Pope Alexander VI
- Lucrezia Bori, Spanish opera singer
- Several women named Lucrezia de' Medici (disambiguation)
- Lucrezia Galletta (1520s - 1580), Italian courtesan and banker
- Lucrécia Jardim (born 1971), Portuguese athlete
- Lucrecia Kasilag (1917–2008), Filipino composer
- Lucrecia de León (born 1568), Spanish alleged prophetic dreamer
- Lucrezia Lerro (born 1977), Italian poet and writer
- Lucrezia Magistris (born 1999), Italian weightlifter
- Lucrezia Mantovani (born 1984), Italian politician
- Lucrecia Martel (born 1966), Argentinian film director
- Lucrezia Millarini, British TV news anchor
- Lucrezia Ruggiero (born 2000), Italian artistic swimmer
- Lucrezia Tornabuoni, Italian political adviser and poet
- Lucrecia Undurraga Solar 1841–1901), Chilean novelist, publisher and women's education rights advocate

== Fictional characters ==
- Lucrecia Crescent, minor character in the video game Final Fantasy VII
- Lucrezia Noin, character from the anime Mobile Suit Gundam Wing
- Lucrezia Warren Smith, character in Virginia Woolf's 1925 novel Mrs Dalloway
- Lucrecia "Lu" Montesinos Hendrich in Netflix's Original series Élite (TV series)
- Lucrezia Mongfish, character in the comic series Girl Genius

== Other ==
- Lucrezia (opera), a 1937 opera by Ottorino Respighi

== See also ==
- Lucrezia Borgia (disambiguation)
- Lucretia, legendary figure in the history of the Roman Republic
- Lucretia (disambiguation) for other uses
