= Center for COVID Control =

COVID-19 testing company

Center for Covid Control (CCC) is a pop-up laboratory testing company based in Rolling Meadows, Illinois. It had a peak of 300 testing sites, often in storefronts or temporary buildings. In January 2022 USA Today named the entity in an article about problems with pop-up testing sites, and stated that it was under investigation by several state and federal agencies.

CCC has received at least $124 million in federal reimbursements.

CCC is associated with Doctors Clinical Laboratory, and shares the same office address. A pigments supplier named DCL Corporation has sent a cease and desist to Doctors Clinical Laboratory for using their trademarked logo.

By January 13, 2022, the Doctors Clinical Laboratory was under investigation by the Center for Clinical Standards and Quality, part of Centers for Medicare and Medicaid Services. Investigations in November and December had found serious problems with CCC and DCL, stating "non-compliance" and cited the lab for "immediate jeopardy".

CCC announced on January 14, 2022, that it would pause its operations for a week to train staff.

On January 19, 2022, the Minnesota Attorney General's Office filed a suit against the company for deceptive practices. Several consumer complaints documented filled out the online testing form but never giving a sample, then receiving a rapid antigen testing report stating their test was negative. The attorney general of Colorado demanded that the company cease COVID testing operations in the state, and the city of Worcester, Massachusetts demanded CCC shut down.

The company is under investigation by the Oregon Department of Justice.
