= Lucrece =

Lucrece or Lucrèce may refer to:

- Lucretia, ancient Roman noblewoman
- Lucrèce (film), 1943 French film
- Lucrèce (1908 film), 1908 film directed by Louis Feuillade
- Lucrece (play), play by Thornton Wilder
- Lucrèce (Filleul), play by Nicolas Filleul
- Lucrece (poem), alternative name for Shakespeare's The Rape of Lucrece

== See also ==
- Lucretia (disambiguation)
