= Fabiola Hospital =

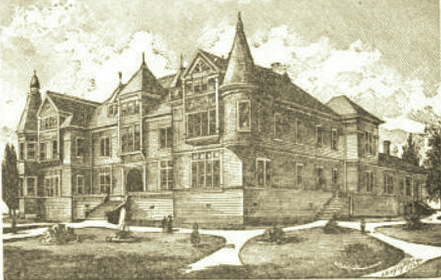
- (1891)

Geography
- Location: Oakland, California, U.S.

Organisation
- Care system: homeopathoc; eclectic

History
- Opened: 1876
- Closed: 1932
- Demolished: 2005

The Fabiola Hospital (also known as Oakland Homeopathic Hospital and Dispensary Association) is a defunct American hospital in Oakland, California. Named after Saint Fabiola, it was founded in 1876 (Note: According to Ullman (2007), the Fabiola Hospital was founded in 1857. According to Mabie (1899), it was 1877.) by 18 women. The medical staff was composed of representatives from the homeopath and eclectic schools. This allowed patients entering the hospital to have their choice as to their method of treatment. The hospital association was popular and well supported. They managed the hospital well, free from debt, as well as a training school for nurses, an ambulance system, and district nursing. Nurses were supplied from the hospital for private cases.

The hospital closed in 1932 with the headline in the October 16 issue of the Oakland Tribune: "Fabiola Ends Experiment in 'Feminism'". It was donated to Merritt Hospital the following year. In 1942, it was dedicated as the Permanente Hospital. The hospital was demolished in 2005, replaced by a parking lot.

== History ==
In 1877, 40 of the benevolent women of Oakland, realizing the need of a hospital, formed an organization for the purpose of maintaining one, since known as the Fabiola Hospital Association. At that time, the only hospital on the east shore of San Francisco Bay was the County Infirmary 10 miles (16 km) away, while the most accessible was in San Francisco at least 6 miles (9.7 km) distant.

A small dwelling house was rented and the hospital opened with a working force consisting of a matron and her assistant. The first annual report noted 23 patients cared for at a cost of US$1,400. Eleven years later, the association acquired a tract of land in the suburbs and moved into a new building, the nucleus of the later hospital. As the work of the hospital increased, new buildings were added, a separate maternity cottage, a children's annex, a cottage where all cases of typhoid fever were cared for, and an isolation cottage. From the first, the hospital was designed to admit three classes of patients:

1. Those who were destitute and unable to pay anything.
2. Those whose means are too limited to enable them to pay for medical attendance.
3. Private patients, or those having means to pay who came to the hospital for the skilled serve and better facilities and possibilities for restoration to health. Very little distinction was made between the classes in care and treatment. It may be added that very few hospitals of this class in California made definite provision for destitute patients.

The hospital received patients from outside of Alameda County in wards for simply cost, and in private rooms at moderate rates. There was a health mutual fund to relieve sick subscribers.

While the grounds were an attractive feature of Fabiola Hospital, originally, there was a lack of provision for outdoor care of patients. Some provision was made in the new surgical building, so that patients could be taken out on the lawns.

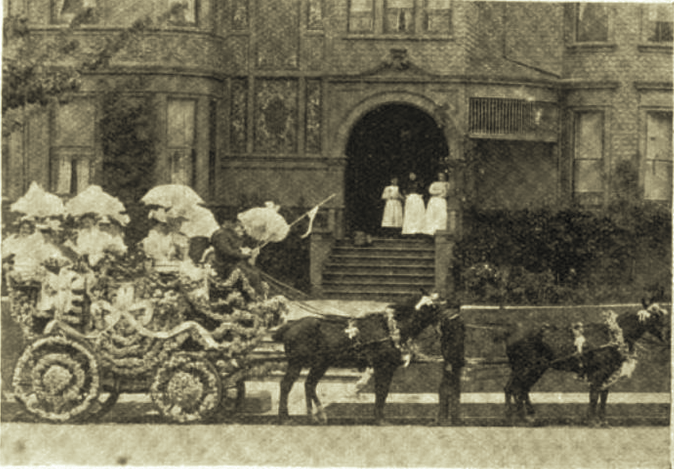
Fabiola Fete (1896)

The Fabiola Fete occurred on May 1 of each year. The carnival of flowers included decorated carriages of the leading charitably inclined society people of Oakland.

The Borrowings series, issued by the Dodge Publishing Company, comprised six titles: Borrowings, More Borrowings, Thoughts, Strength for Every Day, For Thy Good Cheer, and Helps to Happiness. The series was begun by the "Ladies of the Fabiola Hospital Association of San Francisco", who prepared a compilation of sayings of the world's best writers, for the aid of the sick, which proved so successful that the same association followed it up with a succession of books upon the same lines, under the titles given.

== Nurses Training School ==
During the same year that saw the inauguration of a nurse training school in the wards of St. Luke's Hospital, a similar movement was going on in the Fabiola Hospital. The Nurses Training School was established in 1887, under the direction for three years of the resident physician, a woman. In the year 1889, one nurse was graduated and no further note of graduates was made until two years later, 1889. Since that date, classes were graduated every year. A graduate of the Massachusetts General Hospital was appointed superintendent of nurses in 1890, and but three changes were made in this office during these eighteen years. For several years, the superintendent was Miss Sarah Caig, a graduate of the Fabiola school, class of 1894. The pupil nurses had a good general experience in medical, surgical, and obstetrical work. The curriculum for class work and lectures did not vary very materially from that of other schools. A diet kitchen was maintained, where the nurses were taught to cook and serve appetizing meals to invalids. Miss Katherine Fitch, a Johns Hopkins University nurse, was appointed in 1903 and the hospital's new building of 1908 was built in accordance with the plans and suggestions made by her. The school grew rapidly and by 1908, numbered 65 pupils.

== Nurses Home ==
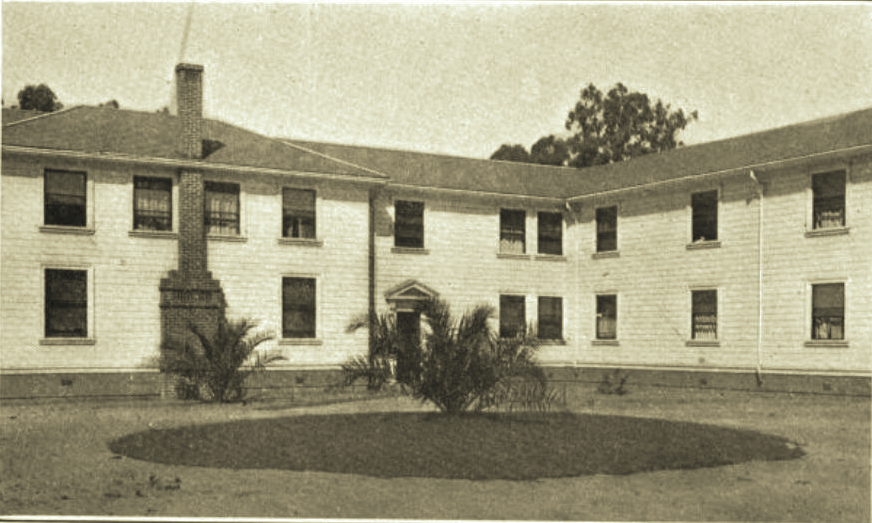
Nurses Home (1908)

About 1900, a large house surrounded by a garden, conveniently near the hospital, was given to the association for a Nurses Home, and five years later, a two-story addition containing 30 bedrooms and a large assembly hall was built. Three assistants and a night supervisor were added to the staff. A graduate of the Drexel Institute was in charge of the Diet Kitchen, where much of the food was prepared for the patients, and from which all trays are served. The Nurses Home had a courtyard, and their garden was filled year round with flowers. From the windows of the new Nurses Home, there were views of the mountains and the bay.

== Surgical building ==
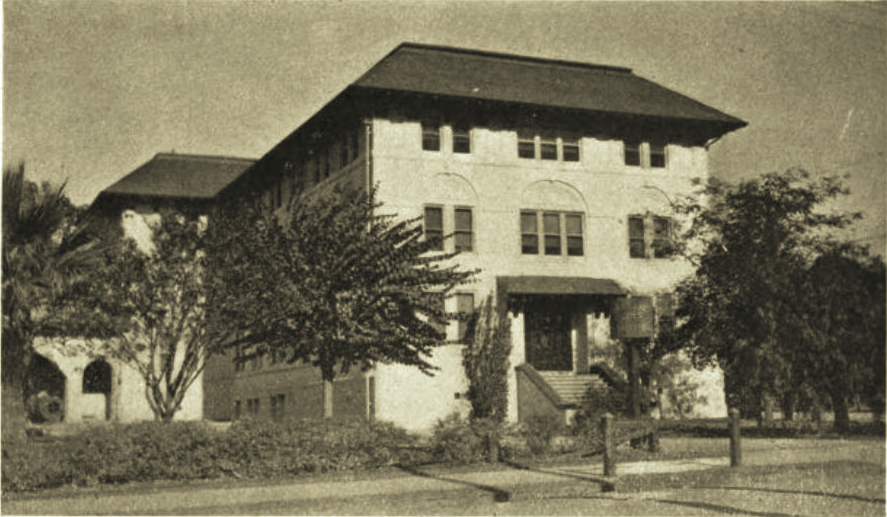
Surgical building (1908)

The new Surgical Building was constructed according to Fitch's plans. It was attractive, with soft-toned walls and red roofs that were associated with the old Spanish missions in California. This gave the hospital accommodation for 120 patients. The new structure was connected with the main building by a corridor from the second floor, in front of which was a large sun porch. The first floors were arranged for patients and had each ten rooms, with a liberal and well arranged allowance of bath and work rooms. The third floor contained three large operating rooms, two of which had an entrance hall and a "cleaning up" room in common; the third, designed for septic cases, opened from a cross hall and had a separate washroom. Two anaesthetic rooms, four dressing rooms, each with a shower, sterilizing room, instrument room and additional work and store rooms occupied the rest of the space. The building was heated by a system of forced ventilation and had all the modern hospital conveniences of the day, including electrical and mechanical devices.

== Legacy ==
Scrapbooks, account books, and letters of the period 1884 till 1952 are held in the collections of the Bancroft Library at University of California, Berkeley.

== Selected works ==
=== Ladies of Fabiola Hospital Association ===
- Yule, Sarah S. B. & Keene, Mary S. (compilers), Borrowings, (New York : Dodge Publishing Company, 1899) (text)
- Freeman, Jessie K. & Yule, Sarah S. B. (compilers), Thoughts, (New York : Dodge Publishing Company, 1901) (text)
- Freeman, Jessie K.; Wilson, Evelyn Stevens, & Yule, Sarah S. B. (compilers), For Thy Good Cheer, a Collection of Helpful and Beautiful Thoughts (New York : Dodge Publishing Company, 1903) (text)
