= Lucrezia Lerro =

Italian writer and poet (born 1977)

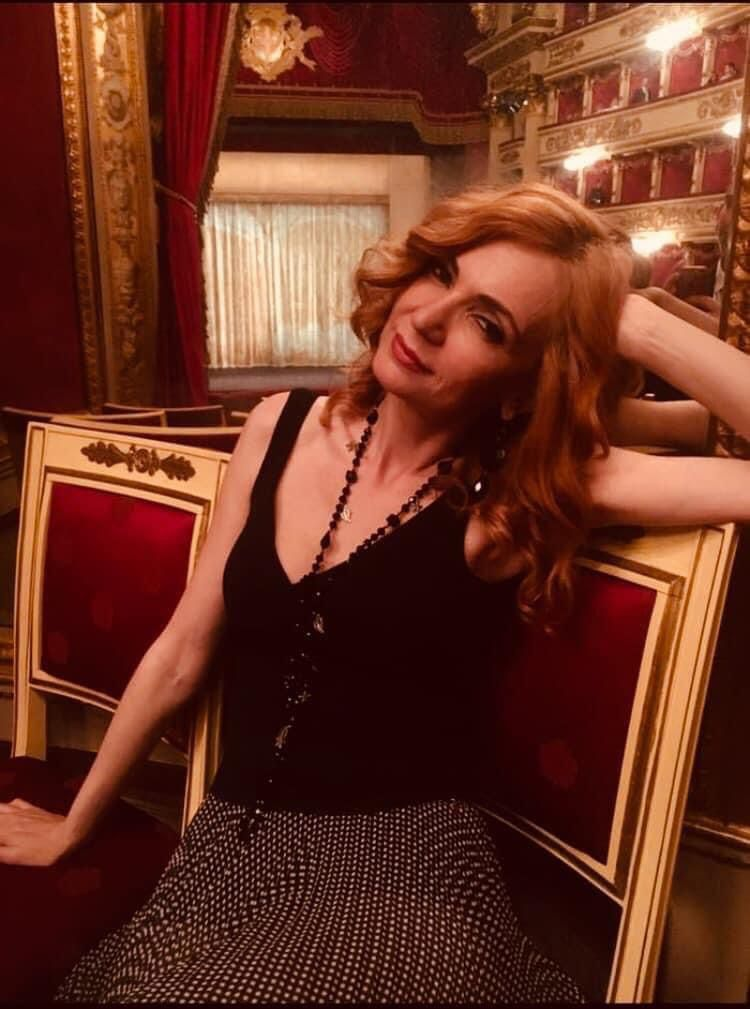
Lucrezia Lerro

Lucrezia Lerro (born 1977) is an Italian poet and writer.

== Biography ==
Born in Omignano, she moved to Florence when she was seventeen to begin her studies at the University of Florence. Later she moved permanently to Milan. She graduated in the Science of Education and in Psychology. Some of her poems have been published in the magazines Poesia (2001–2003), Palomar (2003), Nuovi Argomenti, "Nuovissima Poesia Italiana" (Mondadori) and Almanacco dello Specchio (Mondadori).

The first novel, Certi giorni sono felice, 2005, was a finalists for the Premio Strega award. She has published the novels: Il rimedio perfetto, 2007, La più bella del mondo, 2008 ("Grinzane Cavour" Prize), La bambina che disegnava cuori, 2010, Sul fondo del mare c'è una vita leggera, 2012, all of them published for Bompiani. She also published for Mondadori La confraternita delle puttane, 2013, and Il sangue matto, 2015.

She published the collection of poetry Il corollario della felicità in 2014. For the series Vite esagerate she wrote Il contagio dell'amore, San Paolo Editions, 2016, while in 2017 La giravolta delle libellule was published for La nave di Teseo.

== Awards and honors ==
- Honorary citizen of Omignano Cilento.
- "Mauro Maconi" Prize, 2011;
- "Lions Salerno" Prize, 2012; (Principessa Sichelgaita). Awarded by Camera dei deputati
- "Laurentum" Prize for Poetry, 2014;
- "Premio Internazionale di Letteratura Città di Como" 2015; for poetry.
- Gusto Prize, 2015;
