= Lucrezia Borgia (disambiguation) =

Lucrezia Borgia (1480–1519) was an Italian aristocrat.

Lucrezia Borgia/Lucretia Borgia may also refer to:

- Lucretia Borgia (character), a fictional character in the Alien and Predator franchises, commonly known as MU / TH / UR
- Lucrezia Borgia (play), an 1833 play written by Victor Hugo
- Lucrezia Borgia (opera), an 1833 opera composed by Gaetano Donizetti
- Lucrezia Borgia (1912 film), an Italian film directed by Gerolamo Lo Savio
- Lucrezia Borgia (1919 film), an Italian silent film directed by Augusto Genina
- Lucrezia Borgia (1922 film), a German film directed by Richard Oswald
- Lucrezia Borgia (1935 film), a French film directed by Abel Gance
- Lucrezia Borgia (1940 film), an Italian film directed by Hans Hinrich
- Lucrezia Borgia (1947 film), an Argentine film directed by Luis Bayón Herrera
- Lucrèce Borgia, a 1953 French-Italian film directed by Christian-Jaque
- Lucretia Borgia, the nickname Buffalo Bill gave to his Springfield Model 1866 rifle
