= Lucrezia de' Medici =

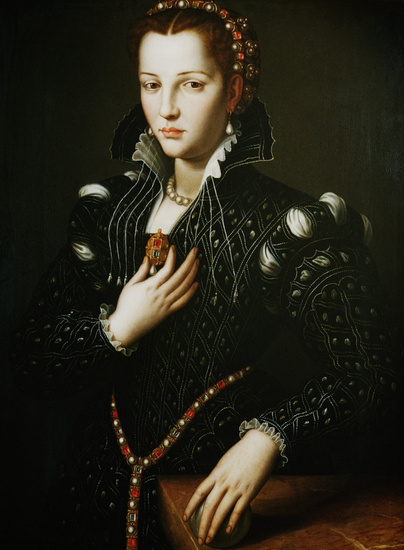
Portrait of Lucrezia (di Cosimo) de' Medici by Agnolo Bronzino.

Lucrezia de' Medici was the name for several women from the Medici family:

- Lucrezia di Piero de' Medici (1447–1493), best known as Nannina de' Medici.
- Lucrezia di Lorenzo de' Medici (August 4, 1470 – between November 10 and November 15, 1550), the elder daughter of Lorenzo de' Medici and Clarice Orsini, and the grandmother of Pope Leo XI. In 1485 she married Jacopo Salviati. She was mother to cardinal Giovanni Salviati and Maria Salviati.
- Lucrezia di Cosimo de' Medici (June 7, 1544 – 1562)
- Lucrezia di Francesco de' Medici (November 7, 1572 – April 14, 1574), the daughter of Francesco I de' Medici and Joanna of Austria, Grand Duchess of Tuscany. She died as an infant.
