= Atchison Village, Richmond, California =

- Atchison Village Defense Housing Project, Cal. 4171-x
- U.S. National Register of Historic Places
- U.S. Historic district
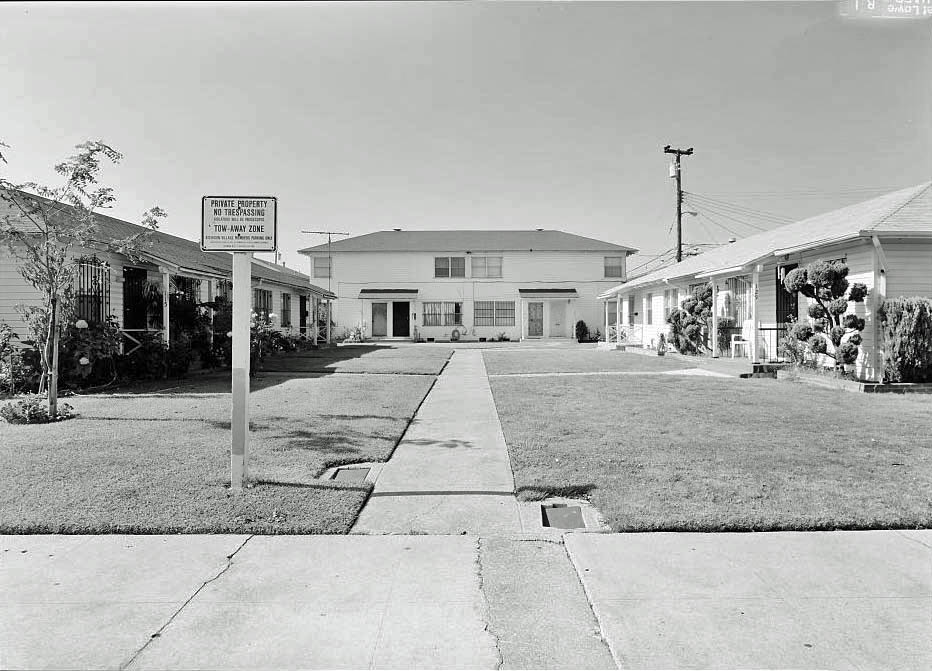

- Location within California Location within the United States
- Location: Roughly bounded by W. Macdonald Ave, W. Ohio St, First St, and Garrard Blvd, Richmond, California
- Coordinates: 37°56′01″N 122°22′18″W
- Area: 30.2 acres (12.2 ha)
- Architects: John Carl Warnecke; Andrew T. Hass
- Architectural style: Mid-twentieth century
- NRHP reference No.: 03000473
- Added to NRHP: May 30, 2003

Atchison Village is a community in Richmond, California which was originally built as housing for defense workers from the Kaiser Shipyards. It lies at an elevation of 13 feet (4 m). Constructed by the Richmond Housing Authority in 1941 as Richmond's first public defense housing project, it is one of the only projects funded by the Community Facilities Act of 1940 (the Lanham Act) that still exists in Richmond and one of the few in the nation not destroyed after the war. It is one of 20 public housing projects built in Richmond before and during World War II. On February 28, 1957, the Village (without the park) was sold by the government to its residents for $1,512,000.00. It has remained a mutual housing community to this day under the ownership of the Atchison Village Mutual Homes Corporation.

== Description ==
Atchison Village includes 450 apartments of five styles in 97 one-story buildings and 65 two-story buildings. Every unit has ground level access both front and back and fenced backyards. Each unit has a dedicated parking space and there is ample on-street parking near each unit on the public streets.

As of May 2012, units cost from $30,000 to $70,000. They are relatively unaffected by the housing bubble or foreclosures, since Use certificates cannot be liened. The low prices may be due to the fact that title to the property is not transferred, but only the occupancy or use rights in the dwelling, making it difficult to take out a loan to buy a Right to Perpetual Use. However, the Atchison Village Credit Union may lend a significant sum against the purchase if the buyer has a co-signer with real property in California.

A maintenance fee, currently averaging ~$400 monthly, covers taxes, insurance, reserve funding, structural maintenance, water and sorted waste collection from curbside individual rolling plastic containers.

The grounds are landscaped, including a large park and separate soccer and baseball fields with bleachers. There is also a small children's playground, completely upgraded with modern Big Toys and soft ground. All streets have sidewalks and street lighting and are patrolled by the Richmond Police Department. There is a large laundromat and small supermarket adjacent, at First Street and Macdonald.

Point Richmond is within walking distance and has two small supermarkets, a post office, bank, public pool, fire station and library. Closer in the other direction downtown are a medical center/hospital, main P.O., and strip shopping center with major drugstore and supermarket. The entire neighborhood is on the National Register of Historic Places and is part of the Rosie the Riveter/World War II Home Front National Historical Park.

The Atchison Village housing project is an example of the local-federal collaboration that provided much-needed housing and domestic support for World War II defense workers and their families. The modest, wood-frame buildings clearly reflect the constraints of time, money and materials placed on publicly funded housing construction during the period, but though simple in design, they have full-dimension clear fir framing and heavy interior plaster. Water mains, electric panels and all roofs have been upgraded at a cost of more than three million dollars. The sewer laterals throughout have been replaced. Reserves for such replacements are replenished through a dedicated portion of the monthly assessments, to avoid the sometimes catastrophic assessments condominium associations may levy when they ignore the need for maintenance of large structural elements.

== Inhabitants ==
Just prior to and during the war, the Lanham Community Facilities Act of 1940 provided $150 million to the Federal Works Agency. It built approximately 625,000 units of housing in conjunction with local authorities nationwide. These were highly sought after and company managers were the most likely to be able to procure housing in Atchison Village during the World War Two era.

AV contains 450 co-op living units. Handicap ramps are permitted, and a majority of units are single story. The auditorium and public restroom is handicap accessible.

The population of Atchison Village became more diverse over the past several decades and in 2017 was increasingly changing through gentrification. In 2017 Hispanic and middle-age to elderly White members made up a majority of Atchison Village membership.

== Crime ==
Atchison Village is located in the Iron Triangle. Although this area was once known as the highest crime area of Richmond, within Atchison Village the crime rate is actually very low. In 2017 the surrounding area was seeing less crime, as well. This was partly due to traffic control gates that separate it from the greater Iron Triangle community, with only one vehicle entrance/exit. In addition, there is an active citizenry, some of whom have lived in the village for more than fifty years, as well as a Crime Watch and citizen patrol in the evenings.

The Richmond police chief, Chris Magnus (chief from 2006 until 2015), was very helpful in increasing police reaction speed to reports of suspicious activity and patrol officers are frequent drop-ins to Atchison Village meetings.

The Mayor Gayle McLaughlin endorsed the idea of a "beat cop" to be assigned to the Village at a subsequent resident meeting about violence in the neighborhood. The Village itself has acted to control unlawful behavior, since it does have the power to expel residents by cancelling their membership for gross violations of their share contract with AVMHC.

Recent placement of powerful security cameras at the outside of the village and installation of a gunshot locating systems in Richmond's high-crime areas has increased policing effectiveness and lowered crime. Prospects are good for continued low crime. The 2009 wave of home desertions did not affect Atchison Village which promptly repairs and auctions empty units. In 2017, vacancy rates were almost always at zero. It should be pointed out, also, that due to the recent gentrification to a largely middle-aged to elderly white population, the prices of homes in 2023 have increased sharply to upwards of $200K+ whereas many members as recently as 2017 were buying in at under $100K.

== Legal issues ==
Overall Atchison Village Mutual Homes Corporation is governed under the California Nonprofit Mutual Benefit Corporations Codes with an eleven-member board of directors, elected at large from the membership. In 2009 it was financially stable and was steadily building structural reserves. Member disputes are largely handled by private hearings and mediation. Members may, however, be expelled for gross infractions of rules included in the contract. This happens very rarely, however, averaging less than one incident in three years for 450 memberships. Since it is a Mutual Homes Association, there have been legal challenges to its inclusion under the Davis–Stirling Common Interest Development Act (certain sections of the California Civil Code which cover Common Interest Developments). A Corporation lawyer advised that the Corporation include it under the Act, although in a 1994 court case, DeForrest v. Atchison Village, the Superior Court judge ruled that technically, the Village is not included therein. However, most corporate decisions made by the Board do include consideration of current D-S regulations.

== Transit ==
Atchison Village is served by the AC Transit 72M bus line, which runs east from Atchison Village up Macdonald Avenue to San Pablo Avenue and then south along San Pablo Avenue to downtown Oakland. A recent addition is the Circular Shuttle, a free service of the City of Richmond, which runs on MacDonald Avenue, and as far north as Doctor's Hospital.

There are connections in Point Richmond for buses to Marin County and points north and south, as well as the 72M stops at the combined BART and Amtrak Richmond station to Davis, Sacramento, and beyond. Freeway access to Interstate 580 and the Richmond-San Rafael Bridge is excellent down one mile of parkway.

== Environmental issues ==
The Chevron Richmond Refinery is about one mile west across Richmond Parkway, the BNSF railway Intermodal switching and loading yard and the Richmond Parkway. An accident at the refinery on January 15, 2007, revealed defects in the community notification system, and several members of the community were affected by fumes. Richmond City Councilman Tom Butt has said that he will make sure that this will not happen again.

Prevailing winds are from the southwest, off San Francisco Bay, but air quality suffers due to nearby commercial activity.

Currently there is much community environmental activism concerning a plan by Chevron to add facilities to process heavier grades of crude oil with more sulfur content (sour crude).

== See also ==
- Mutual Ownership Defense Housing Division
- National Register of Historic Places listings in Contra Costa County, California
