= Lucretia Edwards =

Lucretia W. Edwards (May 15, 1916 Philadelphia, Pennsylvania – October 12, 2005) was an environmental activist and preservationist from Richmond, California.

Edwards was responsible for thousands of acres being added to the East Bay Regional Parks District and the National Park Service. These include the Miller/Knox Regional Shoreline, Point Pinole Regional Shoreline, and Rosie the Riveter/World War II Home Front National Historical Park, which absorbed Lucretia Edwards Park, named in her honor. She was also responsible for the addition of Winehaven, Point Richmond, East Brother Island Lighthouse, and Point Molate to the National Register of Historic Places.

In 1989 Representative George Miller recognized her in the congressional record; she was chosen the Woman of the Year for the 11th District by Assembly Person Bob Campbell. The California State Senate and Assembly honored her in a series of special ceremonies along with 101 women, a Women Legislators Caucus-sponsored honor.

She was married to Tom Edwards and had three children. The family lived in a Point Richmond, California, house for 37 years, where she also died.
