= Kaiser Richmond Field Hospital =

- U.S. Historic district – Contributing property
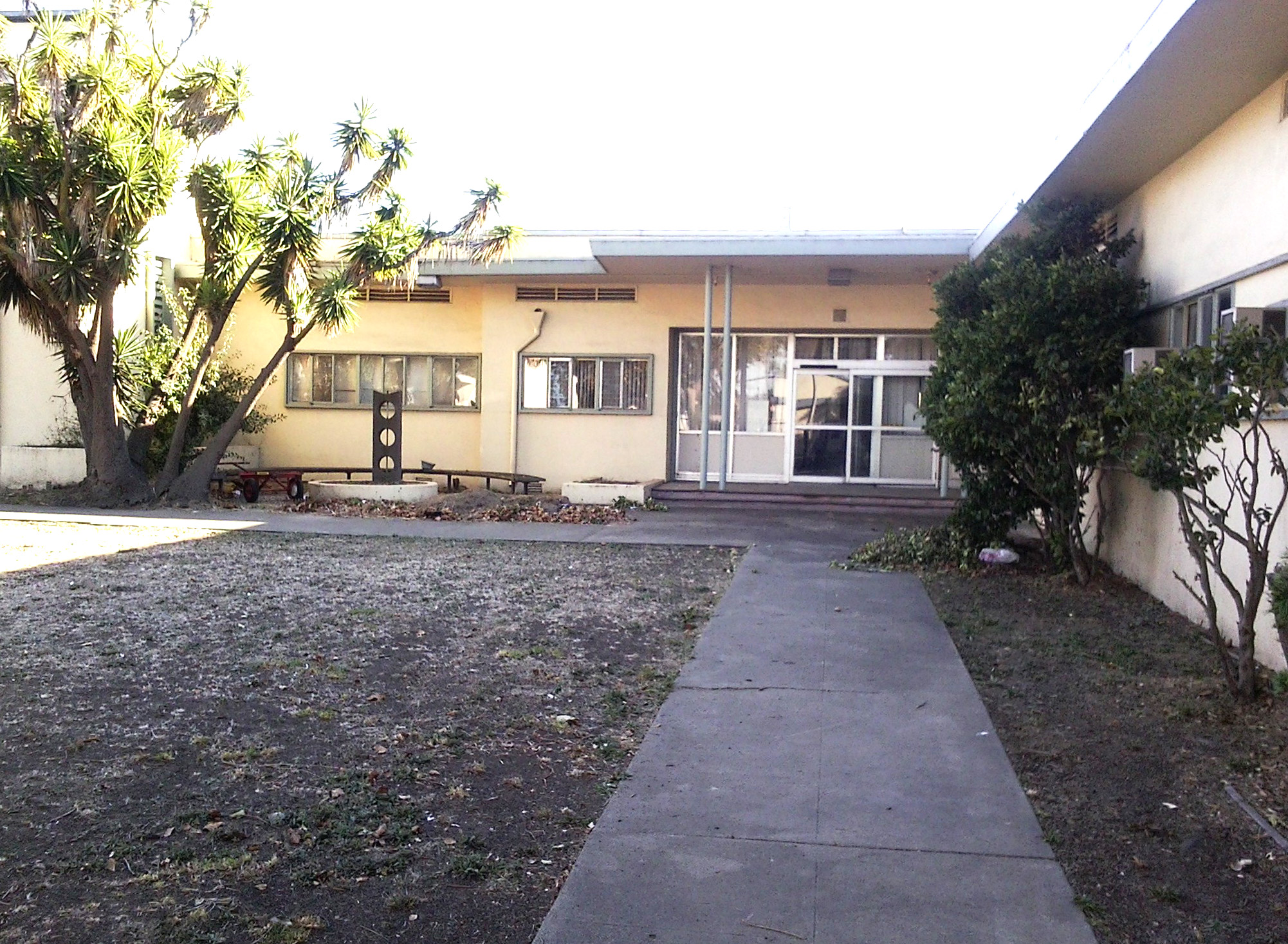

- Location within San Francisco Bay Area Location within California Location within the United States
- Location: 1330 Cutting Boulevard, Richmond, California
- Coordinates: 37.9256356°N 122.3566025°W
- Area: Iron Triangle/Cutting Boulevard Corridor
- Built: 1942
- Architectural style: subdued conmmertial Moderne, white stucco
- Part of: Rosie the Riveter/World War II Home Front National Historical Park (ID01000287)
- Designated CP: January 31, 2001

The Kaiser Richmond Field Hospital was the first Kaiser Permanente Hospital and is a historic site resource of the city of Richmond, California, and a contributing property to Rosie the Riveter/World War II Home Front National Historical Park, listed on the National Register of Historic Places. The hospital provided health services for surrounding communities until 1995 when it was replaced by the then state-of-the-art Richmond Medical Center in downtown Richmond. The field hospital is now closed and remains in its original location in South Richmond along Cutting Boulevard.

== Background ==
More American workers died in Home Front accidents than US soldiers killed on World War II battlefields. This was true up to the Battle of Normandy in June 1944. Henry J. Kaiser, owner of the Richmond Shipyards, realized that only a healthy work force could meet the deadlines and construction needs of wartime America. He institutionalized a revolutionary idea, pre-paid medical care for workers, which soon expanded beyond workers. For many workers, this was the first time they had seen a doctor.

== Hospital operations ==
The Kaiser Richmond Field Hospital for the Richmond Shipyards was financed by the U.S. Maritime Commission, and opened on August 10, 1942. Sponsored by Kaiser's Permanente Foundation, it was run by Medical Director Sidney R. Garfield, M.D. The Field Hospital served as the mid-level component of a three-tier medical care system that also included six well-equipped First Aid Stations at the individual shipyards, and the main Permanente Hospital in Oakland, where the most critical cases were treated. Together, these facilities served the employees of the Kaiser shipyards who had signed up for the Permanente Health Plan (commonly referred to as the "Kaiser Plan"), one of the country's first voluntary pre-paid medical plans, and a direct precursor to the health maintenance organizations (HMOs) defined by the federal HMO Act of 1973.

By August 1944, 92.2 percent of all Richmond shipyard employees had joined the plan, the first voluntary group plan in the country to feature group medical practice, prepayment and substantial medical facilities on such a large scale. After the war ended, the Health Plan was expanded to include workers' families. By 1990, Kaiser Permanente was still the country's largest nonprofit HMO. National Park Superintendent Martha Lee stated that the hospital "was the center of the nation’s first prepaid health care system and was a precursor of today’s HMO’s [sic]."

In part due to wartime materials rationing, the Field Hospital is a single-story wood frame structure designed in a simple modernist mode. Originally intended for use primarily as an emergency facility, the Field Hospital opened with only 10 beds. Later additions increased its capacity to 160 beds by 1944. The Field Hospital operated as a Kaiser Permanente hospital until closing in 1995. Kaiser conducted its first medical research at the facility in 1942 and later at another site before abandoning animal research all together in favor of correlational studies in 1958.

== Current status ==
The site and its parcel officially entitled the Nystrom Tract Addition are owned by Masjeed Al-Noor. It was sold by Kaiser in the late 1990s, after the opening of the Richmond Medical Center and converted to a mosque that was shut down for dilapidated conditions in 2014 by the Richmond Fire Department, which caused accusations of racism by Richmond City Councilman Corky Boozé while the congregation began to meet in a tent according to Richmond Confidential.

In the summer of 2007 preliminary bus tours were begun with a new guideless model, which instead filled half of the bus with residents who spoke of their experiences from the time to put what are otherwise everyday streets for residents into a greater historical perspective.
