= Rosie the Riveter World War II Home Front National Historical Park =

National historical park in Richmond, California, US

- U.S. National Register of Historic Places
- U.S. National Historical Park
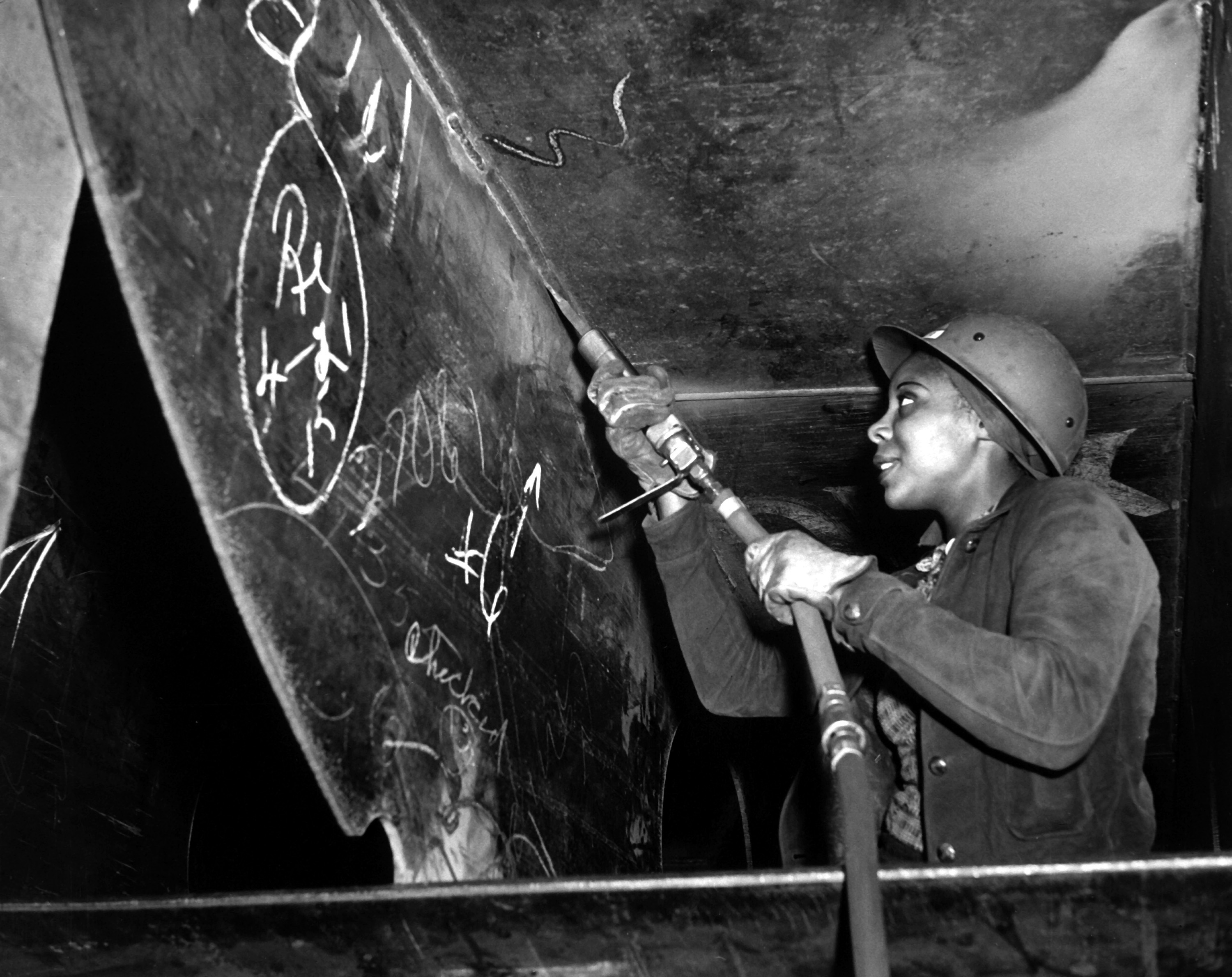
- Eastine Cowner, former waitress, works on a ship under construction, photo by E. F. Joseph

- Location within San Francisco Bay Area Location within California Location within the United States
- Interactive map of Rosie the Riveter World War II Home Front National Historical Park
- Location: Shipyards of Richmond, Richmond, California
- Coordinates: 37°54′34.36″N 122°21′26.48″W
- Area: 145 acres (59 ha)
- Visitation: 33,689 (2025)
- Website: Rosie the Riveter WWII Home Front National Historical Park
- NRHP reference No.: 01000287

Significant dates
- Added to NRHP: January 31, 2001
- Designated NHP: October 25, 2000

Rosie the Riveter World War II Home Front National Historical Park is a United States national historical park located in Richmond, California, near San Francisco. The park preserves and interprets the legacy of the United States home front during World War II, including the Kaiser Richmond Shipyards, the Victory ship SS Red Oak Victory, a tank factory, housing developments and other facilities built to support America's entry into World War II. In particular, the role of women and African-Americans in war industries is explored and honored.

The park is a partnership park, meaning that no land or buildings are actually owned by the National Park Service, which only administers the park. The historical park was established in 2000, and bus tours began in 2007.

== Park attractions ==
Selected locations in the Rosie the Riveter Home Front park area
- Open to the public
- Privately owned
1 Rosie the Riveter Memorial at Marina Bay Park
2 Ford Motor Company Assembly Plant / Visitor Center / Lucretia Edwards Park, Harbor Way
3 Kaiser Shipyard No. 3
4 SS Red Oak Victory
5 Maritime Child Development Center | 1014 Florida Ave
6 Atchison Village, Macdonald Ave
7 Kaiser Richmond Field Hospital, 1330 Cutting Blvd

A feasibility study was authorized under P.L. 105-355 (Sec. 505), sponsored by Rep. George Miller, to determine if the proposed park was suitable to be designated as a National Park Service affiliated site. The subsequent feasibility study concluded "the collection of historic structures and sites in Richmond is nationally significant" and recommended that a National Historic Park be established, citing multiple historic structures that remained intact including Atchison Village, the Maritime and Ruth C. Powers child development centers, Kaiser Permanente Hospital, Richmond Fire Station No. 67A, Richmond Shipyard #3, Ford Assembly Building, and Oil House. Subsequently, P.L. 106-352 established the Historical Park, granting the United States Secretary of the Interior power to establish cooperative agreements with the owners of the listed historic structures and nearby local parks, including the Shimada Peace Memorial Park, Westshore Park, Sheridan Observation Point Park, San Francisco Bay Trail, and Vincent Park.

The park's visitor center is in the Oil House, a small auxiliary building next to the restored Ford Assembly Building, with a number of permanent and temporary exhibits about the history of Richmond's wartime industries and workers. A film also illustrates the home-front battle. Rangers are available to answer questions, and also lead guided tours and conduct other interpretive programs.

A self-guided auto tour with optional walking tour is available for downloading. In the summer of 2007, preliminary bus tours began with a new guideless model, which instead filled half of the bus with residents who spoke of their experiences from the time to put what are otherwise everyday streets for residents into a greater historical perspective.

The Rosie the Riveter Memorial in Marina Bay Park is open year-round, dawn to dusk, as are the other Richmond city parks within the National Park's boundaries.

=== Rosie Memorial ===
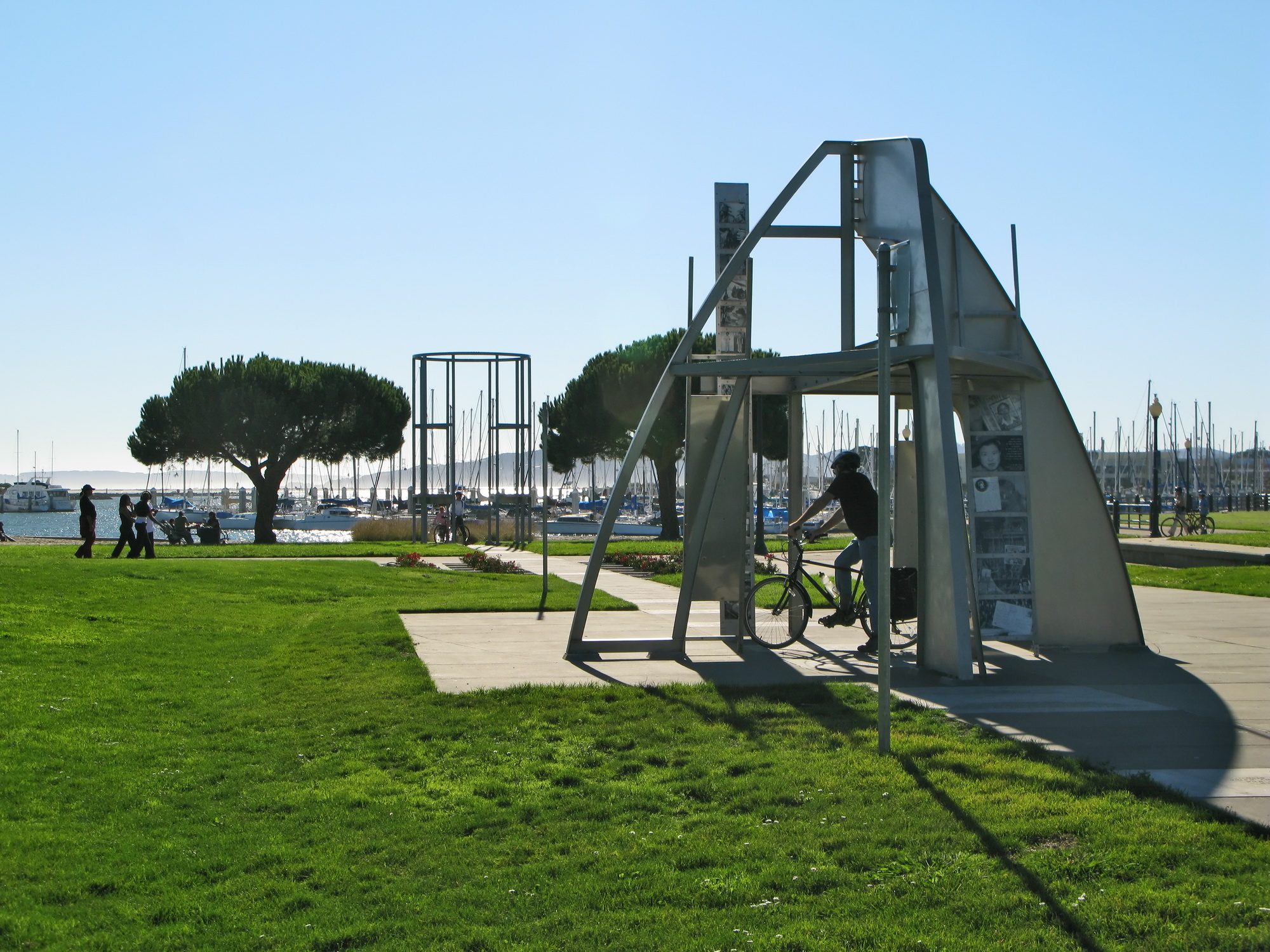
The Rosie Memorial in October 2007

The park's creation was spurred by the construction of a Rosie the Riveter memorial in Marina Bay Park along the city's shoreline, formerly Kaiser Richmond Shipyard #2. The memorial was intended to honor the "Rosies", women who made up much of the workforce at the shipyards, and started in 1997, three years prior to the creation of the national park. The effort behind the memorial was initiated by then-Councilwoman Donna Powers. It grew under Project Director Donna Graves to become the first national tribute to home front American women. A competition was held, selecting the final design in November 1998.

The four Richmond shipyards, with their combined 27 shipways, produced 747 ships, more than any other shipyard complex in the country. Richmond was home to the largest shipyard and 55 other war industries, more than any other city of its size in the United States. The city grew nearly overnight from 24,000 people to 100,000 people, overwhelming the available housing stock, roads, schools, businesses and community services.

The memorial was designed by landscape architect Cheryl Barton and visual artist Susan Schwartzenberg and dedicated on October 14, 2000, in a ceremony hosted by Donna Powers and attended by more than 100 "Rosies". It is the length of the keel of a Liberty ship, representing the skeletal form of a ship under construction. A simple metal pier serves as the stern at the south end, on the water's edge, proceeding north through a cylindrical framework as the smoke stack, and the bow as the main monument, made of prefabricated parts similar to those assembled by the shipyard workers. At the monument, there are 39 photographs, news clippings, and memorabilia. A timeline of World War II is presented in 25 panels laid along the Keel Walk, a 441 ft (134 m) walkway running the length of the memorial. Interpretive signs and exhibits within the structures present information on women's history, labor history, and the home front.

=== Ford Richmond Plant ===
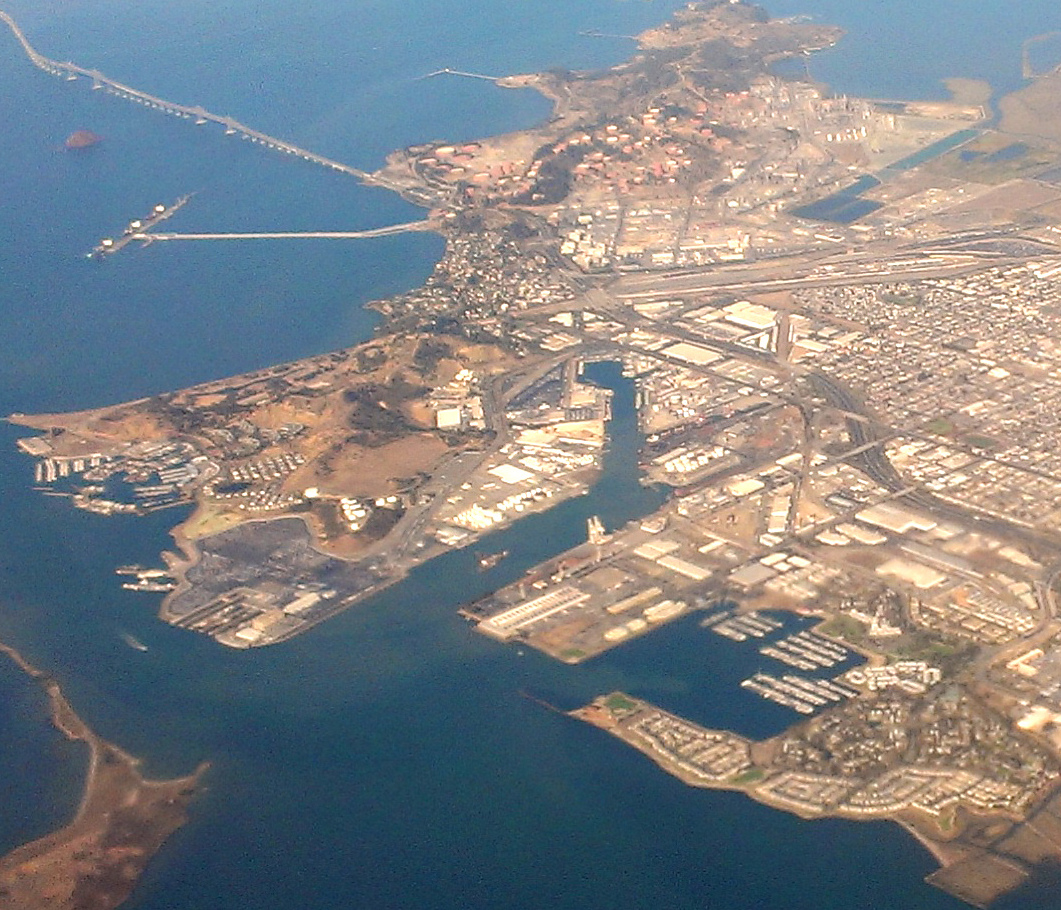
The Ford Assembly Plant is visible in the approximate center of this aerial photograph as the long building on the square point extending south into Richmond Harbor; to the east, the shoreline wraps around Marina Bay while Shipyard No. 3 is west across Harbor Channel.

The Ford Motor Company Assembly Plant was the largest assembly plant to be built on the West Coast. One of only three tank depots in the entire country, approximately 49,000 jeeps were assembled and 91,000 other military vehicles were processed here. Ford employed thousands of workers at the site during World War II, many of them women who were entering the work force for the first time. "Rosie the Riveter" was a period song representing these women.

In mobilizing the wartime production effort to its full potential, Federal military authorities and private industry began to work closely together on a scale never seen before in American history. This laid the groundwork for what became known as the "military-industrial complex" during the Cold War years.

Noted architect Albert Kahn is credited with the design of the Ford plant in Richmond. After World War II, Ford moved its Northern California factory to Milpitas, which was known as the San Jose Assembly Plant; the building and site are now the Great Mall of the Bay Area.

The plant building has been restored and now houses a variety of private businesses along with the NPS visitor center.

=== Richmond Shipyards ===
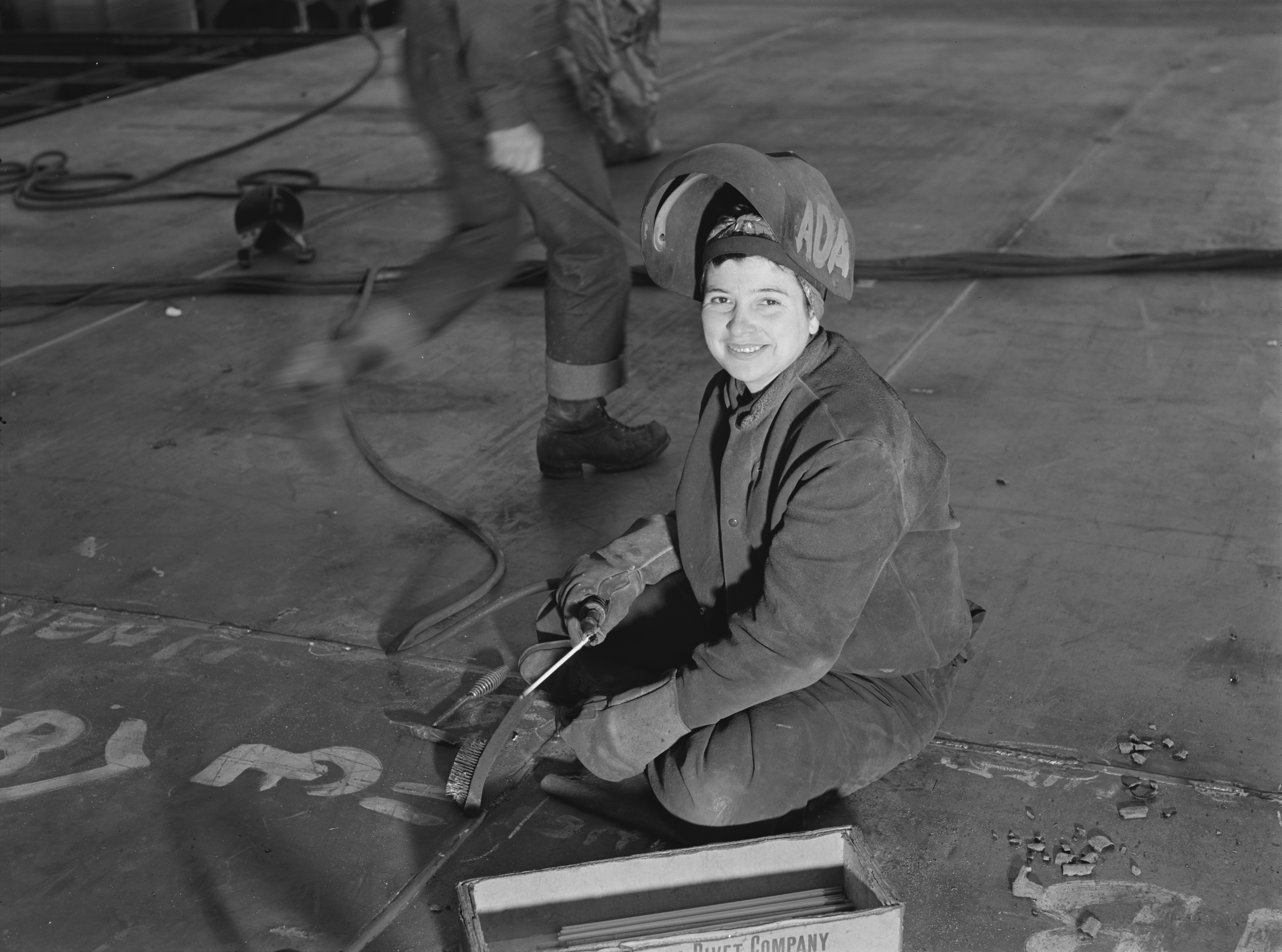
A welder looks up from her work at Richmond shipyard, 1943

The four Richmond Shipyards were part of the Kaiser Shipyards; construction started in early 1941 and the shipyards were completed by 1942. The construction of 747 ships during the war here is a feat not equaled anywhere else in the world, before or since. In 1997, the Richmond City Council began the effort to build the Rosie Memorial and passed Resolution 203-97, authorizing the submittal of Shipyard No. 3 for inclusion on the National Register of Historic Places and as a California Historic Landmark. The park's Rosie memorial is located on the former grounds of Shipyard No. 2. Shipyard No. 3 was listed on the NRHP in April 2000.

Both Liberty and Victory ships were constructed here. These ships were completed in two-thirds the amount of time and at a quarter of the cost of the average of all other shipyards. The SS Robert E. Peary was assembled in less than five days as a part of a special competition among shipyards; but by 1944 it was only taking the astonishingly brief time of a little over two weeks to assemble a Liberty ship by standard methods.

=== SS Red Oak Victory ===
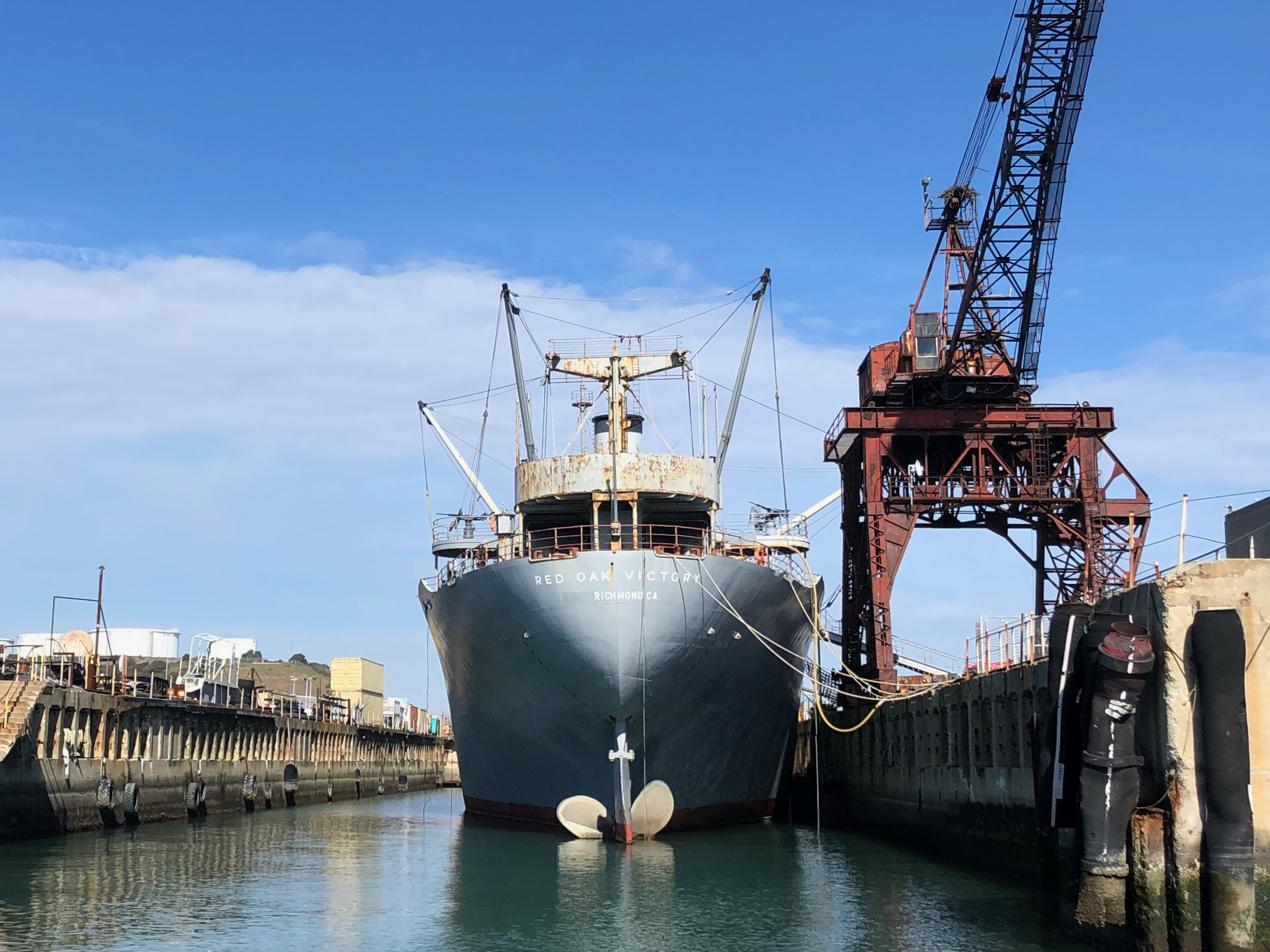
SS Red Oak Victory as a museum ship

The SS Red Oak Victory is a Victory ship preserved as a museum ship. It was one of 414 Victories built during World War II (constructed at the Richmond Shipyards), but one of only a few of these ships to be transferred from the Merchant Marine to the U.S. Navy. The vessel issued cargo and munitions to various ships in the fleet throughout 1945. During a hazardous tour of duty in the Pacific, SS Red Oak Victory handled many tons of ammunition, supplying the fleet without a single casualty.

=== Atchison Village Housing Project ===
The huge influx of workers coming to live in cities like Richmond, caused intense strain on city infrastructure. One of these strains was the severe lack of housing. Workers arriving in these rapidly expanding urban centers were forced to find what they could. They slept in all night movie houses, shared "hot beds" (i.e. when one person got in bed, it was still hot from the last person getting out), or just camped out.

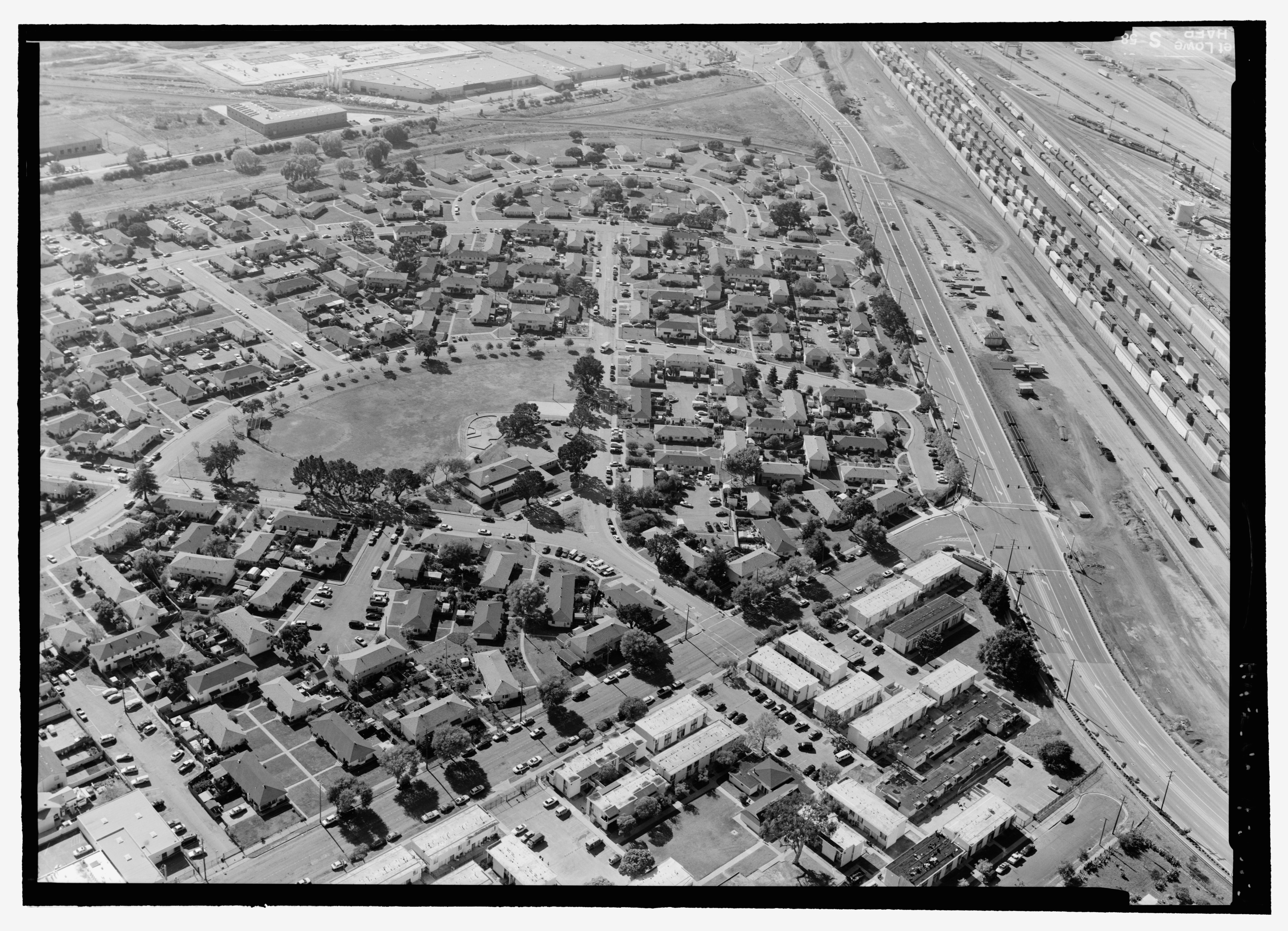
Aerial view of Atchison Village, directed southeast

Atchison Village Housing Project is an example of the local-Federal collaboration that provided much needed housing and domestic support for defense workers and their families. The modest, wood-frame buildings clearly reflect the constraints (time, money and materials) placed on publicly funded housing construction during the period. Just prior to and during the war, the Lanham Act of 1940 provided $150 million to the Works Progress Administration, which built approximately 625,000 units of housing in conjunction with local authorities nationwide. These were highly sought after and company managers were the most likely to be able to procure housing in Atchison Village.

Due to racial discrimination, minorities fared very poorly in gaining housing. They often lived in shacks, in the crates that brought the raw materials to the city, in trailers, or in automobiles. They and other lower income earning workers were lucky when they were able to move to barrack-like dormitories constructed for the mass of World War II workers.

The Richmond Housing Authority was selected to be the first authority in the country to manage a defense project. Atchison Village represents one of 20 public housing projects built in Richmond before and during World War II. Constructed in 1941 as Richmond's first public defense housing project, it is the only project funded by the Lanham Act that still exists in Richmond, and one of the few in the nation not destroyed after the war.

Today, Atchison Village is a collection of privately owned houses managed by a cooperative of the homeowners. While most of the dormitories and other low income housing of World War II are gone, Atchison Village, built as permanent housing, remains.

=== Kaiser Richmond Field Hospital ===
Prior to the invasion of Europe in June 1944, more Americans were dying in Home Front accidents than on World War II battlefields. Henry J. Kaiser, founder of the Richmond Shipyards, recognized that only a healthy work force could meet his deadlines and construction needs. He institutionalized a revolutionary idea, pre-paid medical care for workers, which soon expanded beyond workers. For many workers, this was the first time they had seen a doctor.

The Kaiser Richmond Field Hospital for the Richmond Shipyards was financed by the U.S. Maritime Commission, and opened on August 10, 1942.

By August 1944, 92.2 percent of all Richmond shipyard employees had joined the plan, the first voluntary group plan in the country to feature group medical practice, prepayment and substantial medical facilities on such a large scale. By 1990, Kaiser Permanente was still the country's largest nonprofit HMO.

In part due to wartime materials rationing, the Field Hospital is a single-story wood-frame structure designed in a simple modernist mode. The Field Hospital operated as a Kaiser Permanente hospital until closing in 1995, after a new hospital was built downtown.

=== Maritime and Ruth Powers Child Development Centers ===
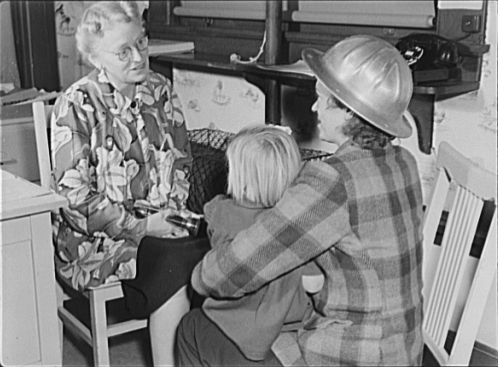
Midnight-shift shipyard worker Arlene Corbin (right) brings her daughter to a day care facility before going home to sleep

The Maritime and Ruth Powers Child Development Centers were two of approximately 35 nursery school units of varying sizes established in the Richmond area during World War II in order to provide child care for women working in the Kaiser shipyards. The Maritime center was funded and constructed by the Maritime Commission as part of a larger development that also included housing, an elementary school and a fire station. The temporary housing was demolished after the war but a larger permanent housing complex remains as do the other buildings.

The Maritime Child Development Center, a wood frame, modernist style building operated by the Richmond School District, incorporated progressive educational programming, and was staffed with nutritionists, psychiatrists and certified teachers. It had a capacity of 180 children per day. At its peak, with 24,500 women on the Kaiser payroll, Richmond's citywide child care program maintained a total daily attendance of 1,400 children. Unlike the federally funded WPA day care facilities implemented during the New Deal, the World War II centers were not intended for use by the destitute, but for working mothers.

The Kaiser-sponsored Child Care Centers, particularly those at Kaiser's industrial sites in Vanport, Oregon, and Vancouver, Washington, gained a reputation for innovative and high quality child care. The center is still in operation today.

=== Lucretia Edwards Shoreline Park ===
Lucretia Edwards Shoreline Park, named in honor of local community activist Lucretia W. Edwards, honors the wartime contributions made by the Bay Area Shipyards during World War II.

In addition to the local Richmond Shipyards, shipworker's bootprints with plaques set in the sidewalks and long low seating walls point visitors to the other Bay Area shipyards.

The following inscriptions are engraved into the concrete walls:

- Bethlehem San Francisco – The only privately owned shipyard in the nation to operate a submarine repair base, this 16th Street yard overhauled 31 subs in two years.
- Moore Dry Dock handled the difficult jobs of production, repair and conversion that slowed overall output in other yards.
- Hunters Point Naval Dry Dock – Hunters Point repaired 600 fighting and support ships.
- Mare Island Naval Shipyard – Mare Island built more than 400 vessels. Mare Island Naval Shipyard set a shipbuilding record for a destroyer that was never broken completing the USS Ward in just 17 1/2 days.
- Marinship – The 75,000 Americans who poured into Marinship during the war years build 93 ships.

=== Nystrom Elementary School ===
The Consolidated Appropriations Act, 2023 added Nystrom Elementary School of the West Contra Costa Unified School District to the park. The building was built to accommodate families who moved to Richmond to work at the Kaiser Shipyards.

== See also ==
- Port Chicago Naval Magazine National Memorial
- National Register of Historic Places listings in Contra Costa County, California
- World War II United States Merchant Navy

== Notes ==
- General Management Plan/Environmental Assessment. National Park Service, NPS-August 10, 2008
- General Management Plan Summary. NPS 499 / 104062, September 2010. WorldCat OCLC 670743220
