= Lucretia Xavier Floyd =

American writer

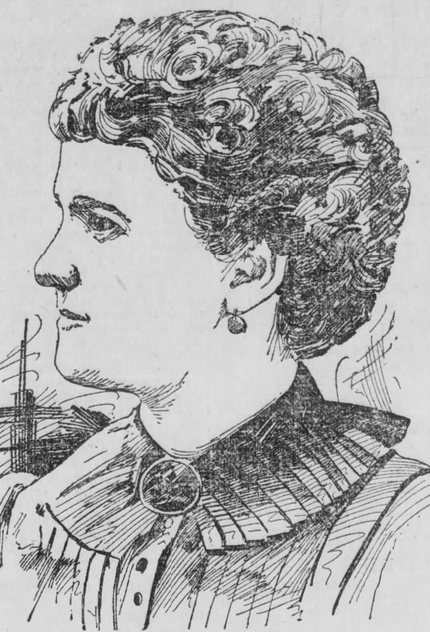
- Lucretia Xavier Floyd, from an 1896 publication
- Born: Lucretia M. F. Xavier; 1860s Spain
- Died: August 20, 1922; Cambridge, Massachusetts, U.S.
- Other name: Lucrecia Xavier de Floyd
- Occupations: Translator, writer, educator
- Known for: A Sunny Morning (1914)

Lucretia Marie Frances Xavier Floyd (1860s – August 20, 1922) was a Spanish-born American writer, translator and educator based in Boston. Her English translation of the Quintero brothers' one-act comedy A Sunny Morning (1914) was widely anthologized.

== Early life and education ==
Xavier was born in Spain and raised in the United States, the daughter of Antonio Xavier and Mary R. Xavier. Her father was born in Portugal and her mother was born in Spain. She attended from Girls' High School in Boston.

== Career ==
Xavier taught Spanish in Amherst and Boston, and at the University of Vermont. She taught French, Spanish and Italian at Wellesley College in 1893 and 1894, and English at a summer school in Cuba. She was one of the organizers of Boston's El Club Español in 1901, with Carolina Huidobro and others, and she gave readings of Spanish poetry and prose there. She also worked as secretary and translator at the Spanish and French consulates in Boston. She was active in the Woman's Relief Corps and the Sons of Veterans Auxiliary.

Xavier wrote short stories and made translations from Spanish. Her 1914 translation of the Spanish one-act comedy A Sunny Morning was widely anthologized. She starred in the first production of her translation, in 1915. Stephen Allard pronounced it "a bright little duologue" and recommended it for use in little theatres. In 1916 she acted in plays by Cervantes, to mark the Spanish writer's tercentenary.

== Publications ==
- "Love's Sacrifice" (1896, short story)
- The Practical Home Physician (translator)
- "A Romance of Santiago" (1912, short story)
- Joaquín Alvarez Quintero and Serafín Alvarez Quintero, A Sunny Morning: A Comedy of Madrid (1914, translator)

== Personal life ==
Xavier married publisher and customs official Ira Waldo Floyd in 1894. She moved to Cuba with him while he was collector of customs at Guantánamo. She died in 1922, at about age 60, in Cambridge. Her grave was in Saco, Maine.
