= Sidney Garfield =

American physician (1906–1984)

Sidney R. Garfield
- Born: Sidney Roy Garfield; April 17, 1906; Elizabeth, New Jersey, U.S.
- Died: December 29, 1984 (aged 78); Orinda, California, U.S.
- Education: University of Iowa College of Medicine, 1928
- Medical career
- Profession: medical doctor

Contractor's General Hospital
- Location within California
- 33°42′49″N 115°24′10″W
- Location: 44300 Ragsdale Road, Desert Center, California

History
- Built: 1933

California Historical Landmark
- Designated: August 17, 1990
- Reference no.: 992

Sidney R. Garfield (April 17, 1906 – December 29, 1984) was an American physician and a pioneer of health maintenance organizations. He co-founded the Kaiser Permanente healthcare system with businessman Henry J. Kaiser. He graduated from the University of Iowa College of Medicine in 1928, which is now called the Roy J. and Lucille A. Carver College of Medicine.

== Life and career ==
Garfield was born in Elizabeth, New Jersey, the son of Bertha and Isaac Garfield. His parents were Russian Jewish immigrants.

In 1933, Garfield opened his 6-bed Contractor's General Hospital in the Mojave Desert, east of Los Angeles, north of Desert Center, California. At the time of its construction and use, it was the only air-conditioned building between Los Angeles and Phoenix. This hospital was set up to provide medical care for the 5,000 workers on the Metropolitan Water District of Southern California's aqueduct, which was designed to bring water from the Colorado River to Los Angeles.

The hospital started as fee-for-service, but insurance companies were slow to pay, and non-payment was also a problem. Garfield made an arrangement with Industrial Indemnity Exchange, the largest insurer on the Colorado River Aqueduct project. The agreement with the insurance company was structured as a "prepayment" to the hospital—a nickel a day per worker. The new prepaid financing plan was an immediate success.

Garfield was able to provide medical and hospital care for the workers for industrial accidents. The system worked so well that Garfield decided to offer total medical care for the workers for an additional nickel a day from the workers themselves. About 95% of the workers signed up.

The Kaiser Richmond Field Hospital for the Kaiser Shipyards, financed by the United States Maritime Commission, opened on August 10, 1942. It was sponsored by Henry J. Kaiser's Permanente Foundation and Garfield was the Medical Director. The field hospital served as the mid-level component of a three-tier medical care system that also included six well-equipped first aid stations at the individual shipyards, and the main Kaiser Permanente hospital in Oakland, California, where the most critical cases were treated. Together, these facilities served the employees of the Kaiser shipyards who had signed up for the Permanente Health Plan (commonly referred to as the "Kaiser Plan"), one of the country's first voluntary pre-paid medical plans, and a direct precursor to the Health Maintenance Organizations (HMOs) defined by the federal Health Maintenance Organization Act of 1973.

By August 1944, 92.2 percent of all Richmond shipyard employees had joined the plan, the first voluntary group plan in the country to feature group medical practice, prepayment and substantial medical facilities on a large scale.

In part due to wartime materials rationing, Garfield's original field hospital was a single-story wood frame structure designed in a simple modernist mode. Intended for use primarily as an emergency facility, it opened with only 10 beds. Later additions increased its capacity to 160 beds by 1944. The Field Hospital operated as a Kaiser Permanente hospital until closing in 1995.

As the war came to an end, the Bay Area shipyards were rapidly scaled back and closed. The health plan membership shrank precipitously. The caregiving staff was correspondingly reduced. At its nadir as few as a dozen medical doctors remained in the organization. New postwar industries, however, hired workers needing health care. New health plan participants were recruited and expanded to include workers' families as well. Garfield was instrumental in managing this dramatic transformation. He continued in this position into the late 1950s. By 1990, Kaiser Permanente was the country's largest nonprofit HMO.

=== California Historical Landmark ===
California Historical Landmark in the cactus garden at the General George S Patton Memorial Museum, 62510 Chiraco Rd, Indio, California reads:

- NO. 992 SITE OF CONTRACTOR'S GENERAL HOSPITAL - In 1933, Dr. Sidney R. Garfield opened Contractor's General Hospital six miles west of here. His modest facility successfully delivered health care to Colorado River Aqueduct workers through a prepaid insurance plan. Later, in association with industrialist Henry J. Kaiser, Dr. Garfield applied the lessons he first learned at the hospital to create his enduring legacy: Kaiser Permanente, the nation's largest nonprofit prepaid health care program.
