= Lucretia (Raphael) =

Drawing by Raphael

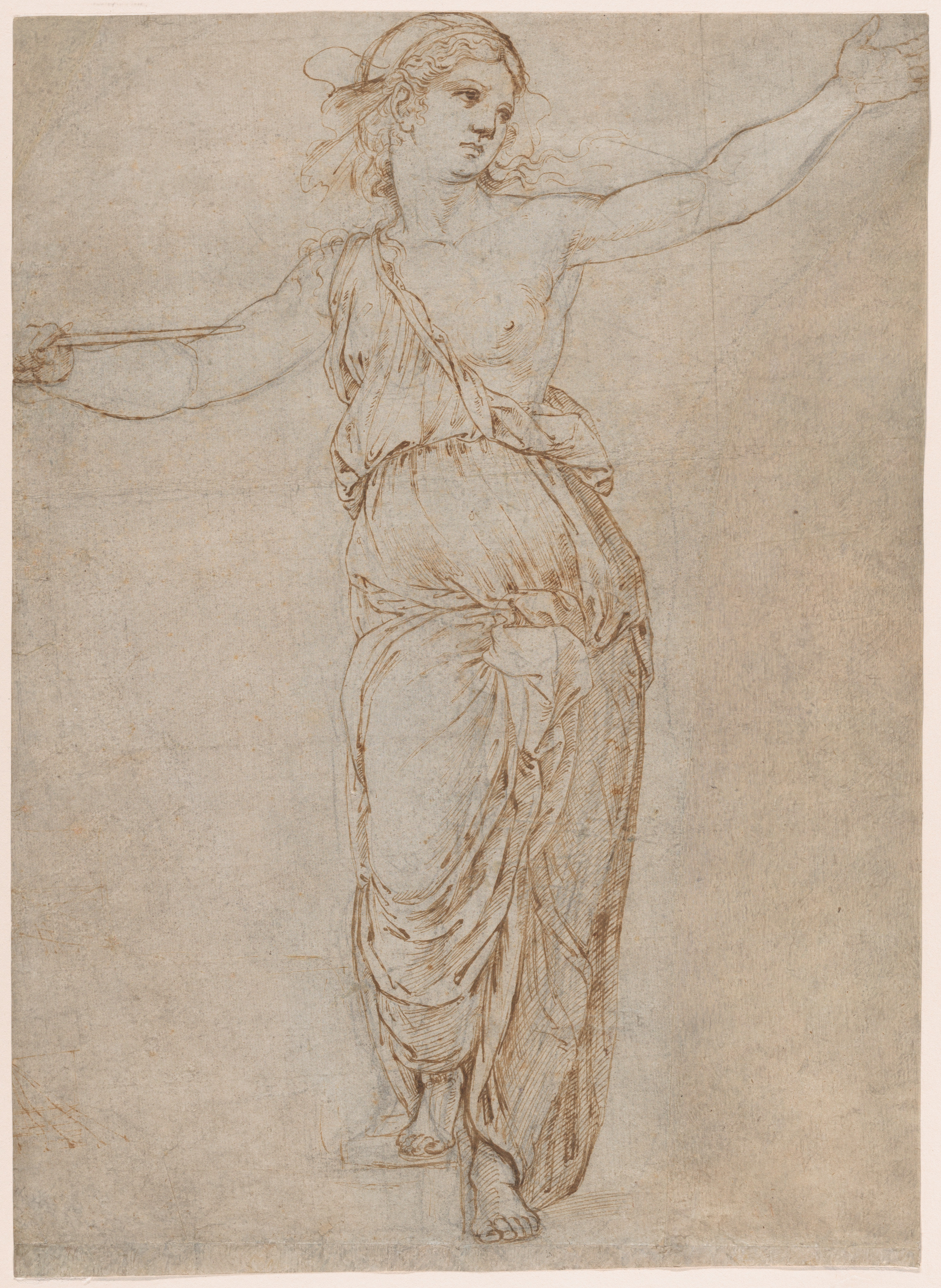
- Year: 1500s (Julian)
- Location: Metropolitan Museum of Art
- Accession No.: 1997.153
- Identifiers: The Met object ID: 337075

Lucretia is a 1500s drawing by the Italian High Renaissance artist Raphael, now in the collection of the Metropolitan Museum of Art.

== Early history and creation ==
William Russell (died 1884) was the drawing's first recorded owner. Russell was the first to attribute the work to Raphael. Sir James Knowles purchased the drawing in 1908.

== Description and interpretation ==
The drawing is executed with pen and brown ink over black chalk on paper. It depicts Lucretia in the moment before she commits suicide by putting a dagger into her chest.

In its time printers would display images of Lucretia with Dido. Copies of the image have a Greek language inscription with it. According to art historian Patricia Emison, the image typifies a contemporary style depicting females standing alone.

== Later history and influence ==
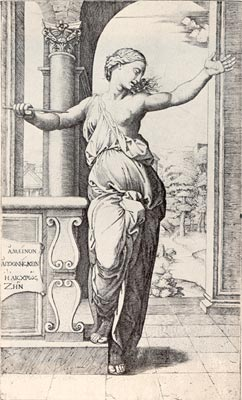
Marcantonio Raimondi's engraving, circa 1510/11

The Metropolitan Museum of Art acquired the sketch in 1997.
