= Lucretia (Parmigianino) =

Painting by Parmigianino

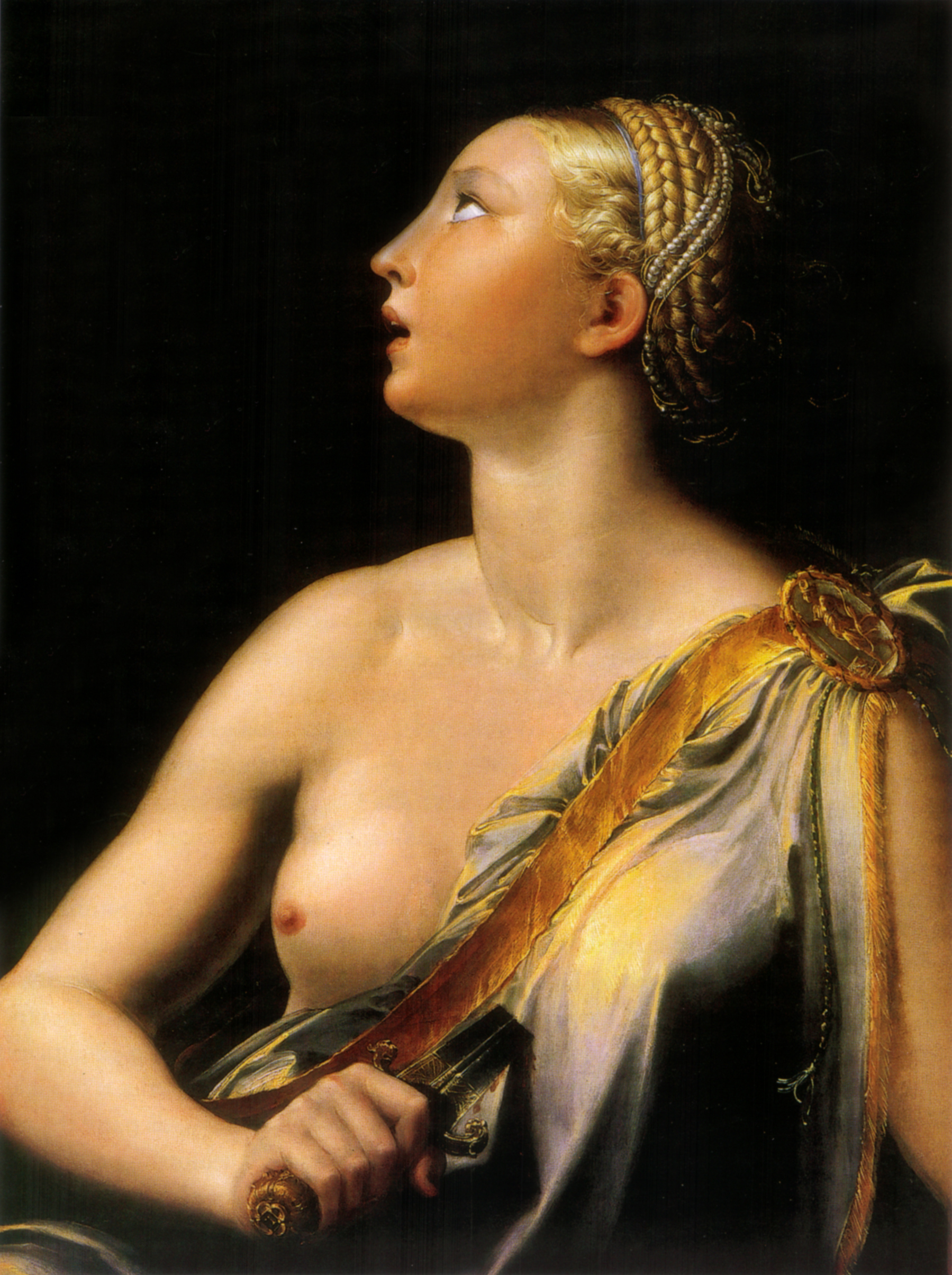
Lucretia (1540) by Parmigianino

Lucretia is an oil on panel painting of Lucretia by Parmigianino, from 1540. It was originally in the Farnese collection, and now is held in the Museo nazionale di Capodimonte, in Naples.

== History ==
It is usually linked to "a canvas of Roman Lucretia, which was almost divine and one of the best works seen from his hand" mentioned in Vasari's Lives of the Artists as Parmigianino's final work, adding that at the time of writing "it has been stolen and nobody knows where it is".

Its late dating is confirmed by its similarities to The Wise and Foolish Virgins (Madonna della Steccata in Parma). There are several early or contemporary copies, one in the Doblyn collection in Dublin, one in Hungary, one in the Uffizi and one which came onto the art market in 1986.

A painting of Lucretia was recorded in prince Ranuccio I Farnese's collections at the end of the 16th century, but Barri's 1670 description of the ducal palace mentions two paintings of Lucretia by Parmigianino, one in the Audience Chamber and one in the "Camera degli Amoretti". The second is now lost but was a full-length work, probably painted for Giovanni Antonio da Vezzani, as recorded by Da Erba in 1572. Its composition survives in an Enea Vico print inscribed "F. V./FRAN. PAR/INVENTOR" and a drawing with variants attributed to Parmigianino.

Damaged in the past, the Naples work was attributed to Pellegrino Tibaldi by Bodmer (1939), to Girolamo Mazzola Bedoli by Frizzoni (1884), Ricci (1894), Testi (1908), De Rinaldis (1911), Freedberg (1950), Fagiolo dell'Arco (1970) and Mildstein (1978). Arturo Quintavalle (1948), Carlo Briganti (1945), Ferdinando Bologna (1946), Roberto Longhi (1958), la Ghidiglia Quintavalle (1971) and Leone de Castris (1994) support its status as an autograph work by Parmigianino, as did Di Giampaolo after its final restoration (1997).
