= Immediate jeopardy =

Medical situation causing serious risk of harm or death

In healthcare in the United States, immediate jeopardy (IJ) is a term for situations in which a medical entity is noncompliant with regulations and requirements in a way that has placed the health and safety of recipients in its care at risk for serious injury, serious harm, serious impairment, or death. Immediate jeopardy, and the noncompliance that created it, carries the most serious sanctions for entities. To qualify as immediate jeopardy, a situation must be clearly identifiable due to the severity of its harm or likelihood for serious harm and the immediate need for it to be corrected to avoid further or future serious harm. Immediate jeopardy warnings are most often applied to nursing homes, but can be applied to hospitals and other providers, suppliers, or medical laboratories.

Following a periodic survey of an entity and a thorough investigation, the Centers for Medicare & Medicaid Services (CMS) or a state health agency acting on behalf of CMS may issue an immediate jeopardy warning (also called a notice, finding, or tag) to an entity. The entity must immediately provide a plan of correction for the immediate jeopardy. Removal of the immediate jeopardy may include termination of noncompliant employees, being placed under federal temporary management, or in severe cases, closure of the entity. CMS requires removal of the immediate jeopardy within 23 days of the warning, and will withdraw funding if the immediate jeopardy is not removed.

A report by the Kaiser Family Foundation found that in 2019, 23% of nursing homes in the US had an actual harm or immediate jeopardy deficiency. Immediate jeopardy warnings for hospitals are much less frequent.

Immediate jeopardy warnings are not necessarily reflected in third-party patient safety rankings.
