= Richmond Progressive Alliance =

Progressive party in Richmond, California

- Abbreviation: RPA
- Founder: Gayle McLaughlin
- Founded: 2003
- Headquarters: 2540 Macdonald Avenue, Richmond CA 94804, Richmond, Contra Costa County, California, US
- Ideology: Progressivism; Social democracy Environmentalism
- Political position: Center-left
- Colours: Yellow; Blue
- Richmond City Council: 3 / 6
- Mayor of Richmond: 1 / 1

Website
- richmondprogressivealliance.net

The Richmond Progressive Alliance (RPA) is a progressive political group in Richmond and western Contra Costa County, California, United States. RPA formed in 2003 by local progressives.

RPA is an umbrella organization for progressives and leftists, regardless of political party. RPA members include voters registered as Democrats, Greens, and Independents. Similarly, RPA electeds include Democrats, Greens, and Independents.

RPA mostly focuses on local elections. RPA routinely wins seats on the Richmond City Council. Richmond has non-partisan elections, which helps groups like RPA win and wield power. This is similar to Progressive Dane, a progressive political party in Dane County, Wisconsin. Richmond also elected all city council seats on a top-3 city-wide basis, which empowered RPA. In 2020, Richmond adopted single-member districts for its city council. In 2024, Richmond's mayor and city council voted to send a ranked-choice (instant-runoff) voting measure to voters.

RPA supports higher taxes and lower pollution for the local Chevron refinery; opposition to racial profiling; and opposition to urban casino development in Point Molate. During the 2000s and 2010s, the alliance altered the balance of power in the city and reduced the representation of Chevron-backed candidates. RPA increased school funding, ended cooperation with ICE for non-criminals, and enacted Ban the Box. While RPA has been in power, Richmond saw a 75% decrease in homicide. Taxes on Chevron, supported by RPA, amounted to $204 million, which RPA invested in social programs.

Notable members who have held public office include Gayle McLaughlin, Jovanka Beckles, Eduardo Martinez, and Claudia Jimenez.

== History ==
=== Origins ===
In 2003 or 2004, an "unlikely group of Greens, Latinos, progressive Democrats, African Americans, and free spirits" founded RPA. Co-founders included Gayle McLaughlin, Marilyn Langlois, and Andrés Soto. McLaughlin cited Peter Camejo's run in 2002 as Green Party candidate for Governor of California as their inspiration for getting involved in politics.

=== 2000s ===
In 2004, RPA member Gayle McLaughlin, a Green and a Democratic Socialists of America (DSA) member, won a city council seat in Richmond. They were the first RPA member to do so.

In 2005, RPA supported transfer of the former Zeneca site at Campus Bay to the California Department of Toxic Substances Control.

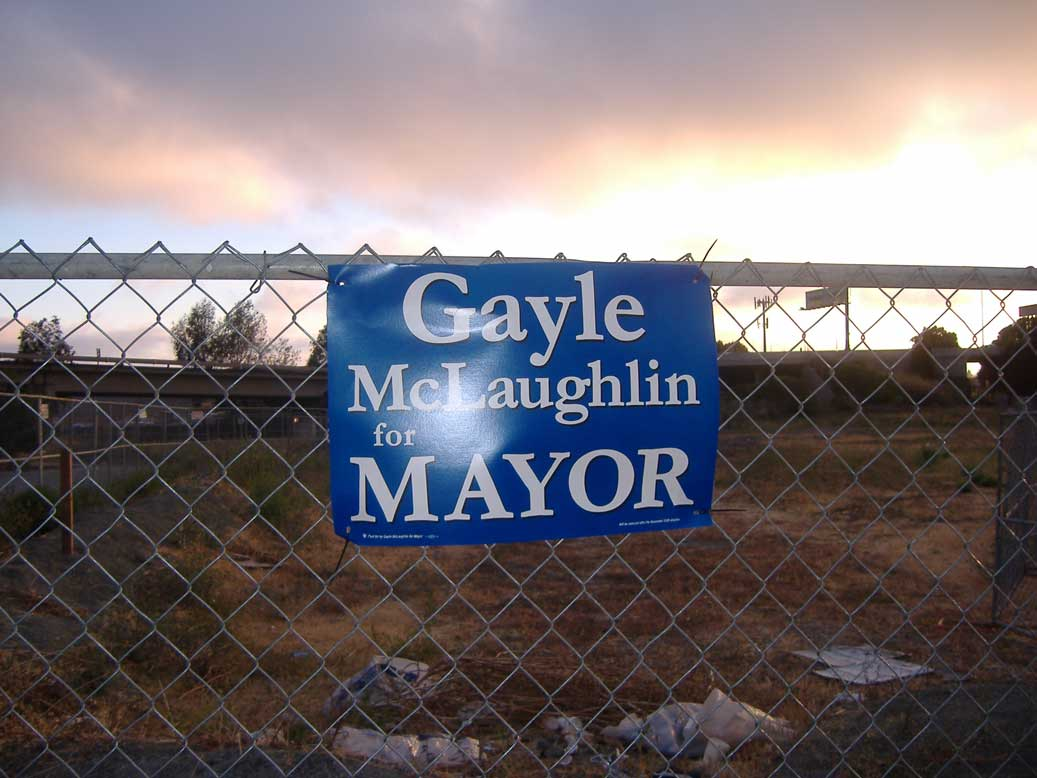
Sign advertising McLaughlin's 2006 run for mayor of Richmond

In the 2006 Richmond, California municipal elections, Gayle McLaughlin won the election for mayor against incumbent Democrat Irma Anderson. This made Richmond the largest city in the United States to have a Green mayor.

In 2008, RPA supported ballot measure Measure T which would substantially increased business license fees for large corporations like Chevron, owner of the Chevron Richmond Refinery. RPA opposed, Measure U, which would enable casino building, like the one proposed for the former Point Molate Naval Fuel Depot, was successfully defeated at the ballot box.

After the 2008 financial crisis, Richmond saw extensive foreclosures. In 2008, Richmond began fining banks $1000 per day if they failed to maintain their property, and had collected $1.5 million by 2014. In 2014, RPA and McLaughlin supported an underwater mortgage bailout program which would use eminent domain to obtain better terms for underwater homeowners; however, banks threatened a capital strike and Congress passed a law banning the practice.

=== 2010s ===
In 2010, RPA negotiated with Chevron to contribute millions of dollars for the city to reinvest in itself instead of facing Measure T which would have forced a change in the utility tax which would have made them potentially contribute more.

In 2012, RPA member Jeff Ritterman proposed Measure N, a tax on sugary drinks. Community Coalition Against Beverage Taxes, funded by the American Beverage Association, spent $2.4 million to defeat it. It was rejected by 66.9% of voters.

In 2014, Richmond municipal elections attracted national media attention, as they were seen as a "David versus Goliath" race in the wake of the 2010 Citizens United Supreme Court case. Chevron spent about $3.1 million to support its own slate of candidates and break progressive control of the council, which was more than Chevron had spent in total on all US Congress races from 2008 to 2012. According to McLaughlin, Chevron "bought up every billboard in town". In the mayoral election, RPA endorsed Mike Parker for Richmond mayor. However, Parker withdrew from the race in August and endorsed Tom Butt, in order to avoid splitting the left and center-left vote. Butt beat Chevron's mayoral candidate, Nat Bates, with more than 51 percent of the election and avoiding a run-off. In the city council election, RPA took all 3 open seats, with McLaughlin, Martinez, and Beckles beating out Chevon-backed candidates Donna Powers, Charles Ramsey, and Al Martinez.

In 2016, RPA won 2 additional city council seats, giving them 5 of 6 city council seats and 5 of 7 voting seats in the Richmond government. Richmond voters approved a controversial rent-control and just-cause eviction measure written and backed by the RPA. RPA's rent control measure passed, which soured relations between RPA and mayor Butt, who opposed the measure.

In 2017, RPA endorsed three members for McLaughlin's empty seat, including Langlois and Ada Recinos. In a surprising decision, the council picked Recinos over Langlois.

In 2018, McLaughlin created the California Progressive Alliance, a statewide offshoot of the RPA which endorses progressive candidates for state and federal elections. McLaughlin ran for Lieutenant Governor of California, but lost.

In the same year, RPA member Jovanka Beckles and former Obama 2008 campaign coordinator Buffy Wicks competed for the California Assembly District 15 seat. Richmond mayor Tom Butt and the California Progressive Alliance endorsed Wicks. Wicks went on to beat Beckles by 12 points and win the seat.

In 2019, Butt blamed the Richmond Progressive Alliance for obstructing appointments to city positions, which are done typically at the prerogative of the mayor.

== Electoral history ==
The table below shows the number of RPA elected officials after the November election:

Year	Richmond City Council	Mayor of Richmond	Refs
2004	1 / 6	did not control	
2006	0 / 6	Gayle McLaughlin	
2008	1 / 6	Gayle McLaughlin	
2010	2 / 6	Gayle McLaughlin	
2012	2 / 6	Gayle McLaughlin	
2014	3 / 6	did not control	
2016	5 / 6	did not control	
2018	3 / 6	did not control	
2020	4 / 6	did not control	
2022	4 / 6	Eduardo Martinez	
2024	3 / 6	Eduardo Martinez	

== Election results ==
RPA has fielded electoral candidates for local and state offices. RPA candidates usually run in nonpartisan elections or as No Party Preference (NPP) independent candidates.

=== Statewide elections ===
Year	Candidate	Office	State	District	Votes	%	Result	Notes	Ref
2018	Gayle McLaughlin	Lieutenant Governor	California	At-Large	263,364	4.0%	Lost	ran as No Party Preference (NPP) candidate; endorsed by CNP, DSA, GPCA, OR, PFP, PP, and RPA	

=== State legislature elections ===
Year	Candidate	Office	State	District	Stage	Votes	%	Result	Notes	Ref
2024	Jovanka Beckles	Senate	California	7	General	18,272	42.8%	Lost	lost to Jesse Arreguín	
2024	Jovanka Beckles	Senate	California	7	Primary	34,085	17.7%	Advanced	ran as Democratic candidate; advanced to the general election in an all-party blanket primary	
2024	Margot Smith	Assembly	California	14	General	57,450	31.5%	Lost	lost to Buffy Wicks	
2024	Margot Smith	Assembly	California	14	Primary	18,272	17.1%	Advanced	ran as Democratic candidate; advanced to the general election in an all-party blanket primary	
2018	Jovanka Beckles	Assembly	California	15	General	90,405	46.4%	Lost	lost to Buffy Wicks	
2018	Jovanka Beckles	Assembly	California	15	Primary	18,733	15.8%	Advanced	ran as Democratic candidate; advanced to the general election in an all-party blanket primary	

=== Local results ===
Year	Candidate	Office	City	District	Votes	%	Result	Notes	Ref
2026	Claudia Jimenez	City Council	Richmond	Mayor			Won	nonpartisan election	
2024	Claudia Jimenez	City Council	Richmond	6	4,232	61.4%	Won	nonpartisan election	
2024	Melvin Willis	City Council	Richmond	1	1,495	39.94%	Lost	nonpartisan election	
2024	Sue Wilson	City Council	Richmond	5	4,079	56.47%	Won	nonpartisan election	
2024	Otheree Christian	WCC School District	Contra Costa	2	5,641	45.31%	Lost	nonpartisan election	
2024	Cinthia Hernandez	WCC School District	Contra Costa	3	Unopposed		Won	nonpartisan election	
2022	Eduardo Martinez	Mayor	Richmond	At-Large	10,319	39.2%	Won	nonpartisan election	
2022	Doria Robinson	City Council	Richmond	3	1,145	39.62%	Won	nonpartisan election	
2022	Jamin Pursell	City Council	Richmond	4	2,027	32.6%	Lost	nonpartisan election	
2020	Gayle McLaughlin	City Council	Richmond	5	4,576	51.75%	Won	nonpartisan election	
2020	Claudia Jimenez	City Council	Richmond	6	4128	54.17%	Won	nonpartisan election	
2020	Melvin Willis	City Council	Richmond	1	2557	58.15%	Won	nonpartisan election	
2020	Jamela Smith-Folds	WCC School District	Contra Costa	1	13,227	56.77%	Won	nonpartisan election	
2020	Otheree Christian	WCC School District	Contra Costa	2	5,357	36.14%	Won	nonpartisan election	
2020	Demetrio Gonzales-Hoy	WCC School District	Contra Costa	4	10,092	49.48%	Won	nonpartisan election	
2020	Leslie Reckler	WCC School District	Contra Costa	5	10,093	37%	Won	nonpartisan election	
2020	Consuelo Lara	CC Board of Education	Contra Costa	1	41,905	50.25%	Won	nonpartisan election	
2018	Melvin Willis	Mayor	Richmond	At-Large	12,917	44.28%	Lost	nonpartisan election	
2018	Eduardo Martinez	City Council	Richmond	At-Large	8,833	11.24%	Won	nonpartisan election, vote for 3, 2nd place	
2018	Ada Recinos	City Council	Richmond	At-Large	7,350	9.36%	Lost	nonpartisan election, vote for 3, 6th place	
2016	Ben Choi	City Council	Richmond	At-Large	10490	20.41%	Won	nonpartisan election, vote for 3, 1st place	
2016	Melvin Willis	City Council	Richmond	At-Large	12137	23.62%	Won	nonpartisan election, vote for 3, 2nd place	
2014	Gayle McLaughlin	City Council	Richmond	At-Large	8,754	16.95%	Won	nonpartisan election, vote for 3, 1st place	
2014	Eduardo Martinez	City Council	Richmond	At-Large	7,629	14.77%	Won	nonpartisan election, vote for 3, 3rd place	
2014	Jovanka Beckles	City Council	Richmond	At-Large	8,322	16.11%	Won	nonpartisan election, vote for 3, 2nd place	
2012	Marilyn Langlois	City Council	Richmond	At-Large	8,610	11.3%	Lost	nonpartisan election, vote for 3, 4th place	
2012	Eduardo Martinez	City Council	Richmond	At-Large	10,956	14.38%	Lost	nonpartisan election, vote for 3, 5th place	
2010	Gayle McLaughlin	Mayor	Richmond	At-Large	9,841	41.58%	Won	nonpartisan election, ran as open Green candidate	
2010	Jovanka Beckles	City Council	Richmond	At-Large	8,135	13.36%	Won	nonpartisan election, vote for 3, 3rd place	
2010	Eduardo Martinez	City Council	Richmond	At-Large	6,564	10.78%	Lost	nonpartisan election, vote for 3, 6th place	
2008	Jovanka Beckles	City Council	Richmond	At-Large	11,090	14.75%	Lost	nonpartisan election, vote for 3, 4th place	
2008	Jeff Ritterman	City Council	Richmond	At-Large	12,180	16.2%	Won	nonpartisan election, vote for 3, 1st place	
2006	Gayle McLaughlin	Mayor	Richmond	At-Large	7,343	37.73%	Won	nonpartisan election, ran as open Green candidate	
2006	Jim Jenkins	City Council	Richmond	At-Large	4,825	22.36%	Lost	nonpartisan election, vote for 3, 5th place	
2004	Gayle McLaughlin	City Council	Richmond	At-Large	11,191	28.84%	Won	nonpartisan election, vote for 3, 2nd place	
2004	Andres Soto	City Council	Richmond	At-Large	8,318	21.44%	Lost	nonpartisan election, vote for 3, 4th place	

== See also ==
- American Left
- Democratic Socialists of America
- Progressive Dane
- Green Party of the United States
- History of the socialist movement in the United States
- List of mayors of Richmond, California
