= 2018 California lieutenant gubernatorial election =

- November 6, 2018
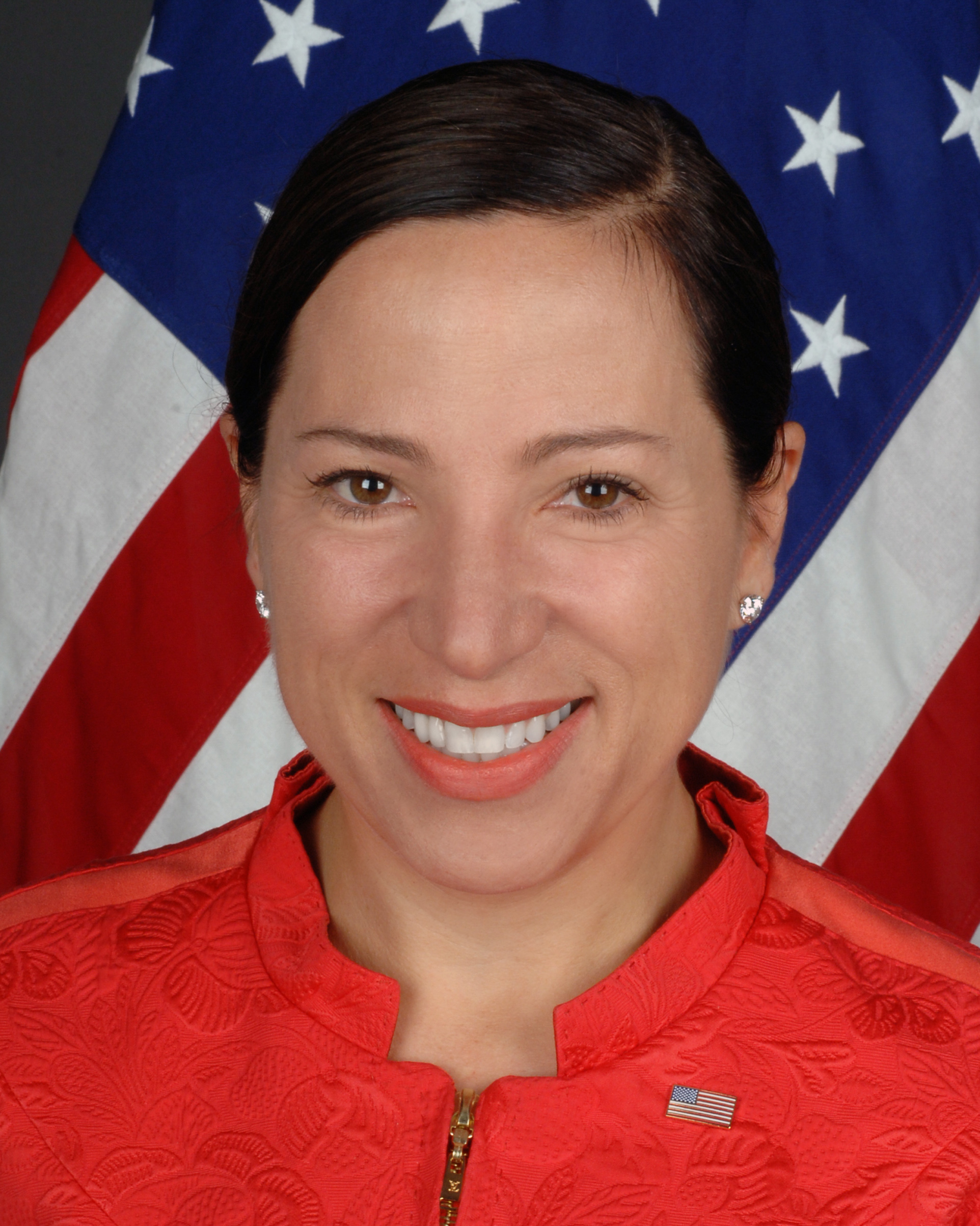

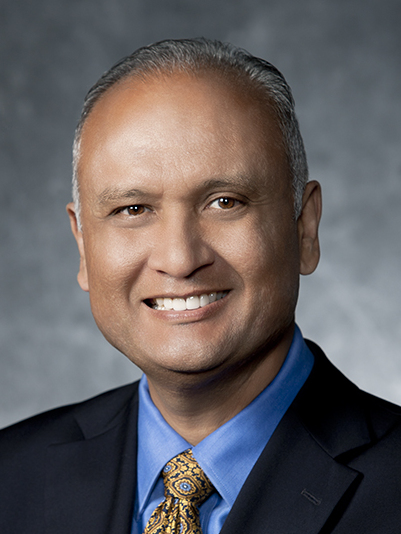
Candidate	Eleni Kounalakis	Ed Hernandez
Party	Democratic	Democratic
Popular vote	5,914,068	4,543,863
Percentage	56.55%	43.45%
- County results Kounalakis: 50–60% 60–70% Hernandez: 50–60% 60–70%
Lieutenant Governor before election
Gavin Newsom
Democratic
Elected Lieutenant Governor
Eleni Kounalakis
Democratic

The 2018 California lieutenant gubernatorial election was held on November 6, 2018, to elect the lieutenant governor of California. Incumbent Democratic lieutenant governor Gavin Newsom was ineligible to run for reelection due to term limits and ran for governor of California instead. Democrats Eleni Kounalakis and Ed Hernandez faced each other in the general election, as no Republican finished in the top two positions of the nonpartisan blanket primary that was held on June 5, 2018.

== Primary ==
=== Candidates ===
==== Democratic Party ====
===== Declared =====
- Jeff Bleich, former U.S. ambassador to Australia
- Cameron Gharabiklou, attorney and businessman
- Ed Hernandez, state senator
- Eleni Kounalakis, former U.S. ambassador to Hungary

===== Declined =====
- Kevin de León, president pro tempore of the California State Senate (running for U.S. Senate)
- Mike Gatto, state assemblyman (running for state treasurer)
- Mark Leno, former state senator (running for mayor of San Francisco)
- John Pérez, former speaker of the California State Assembly
- Darrell Steinberg, mayor of Sacramento and former state senator

==== Republican Party ====
===== Declared =====
- David Fennell, venture capitalist
- Cole Harris, businessman
- David Hernandez, retired business owner
- Lydia Ortega, San Jose State University economics professor
- Matthew Salzer, micronationlist (write-in)

===== Declined =====
- Tom Berryhill, state senator
- Anthony Cannella, state senator

==== Libertarian Party ====
===== Declared =====
- Tim Ferreira

==== No party preference ====
===== Declared =====
- Gayle McLaughlin, former mayor of Richmond
- Danny Thomas

=== Endorsements ===
Jeff Bleich

Organizations

- Brady Campaign
- Moms Demand Action Gun Sense Candidate
- Sierra Club California

Newspaper editorial boards

- The Daily Californian
- East Bay Times
- Marin Independent Journal
- Sacramento Bee
- San Francisco Chronicle
- San Jose Mercury News

Federal officials

- Denise Bauer, former U.S. ambassador to Belgium
- John Berry, former director of Office of Personnel Management and Former U.S. ambassador to Australia
- Don Beyer, U.S. representative (D-VA-8), former U.S. ambassador to Switzerland and Liechtenstein, and former lieutenant governor of Virginia
- James Clapper, former director of National Intelligence
- Chris Coons, U.S. senator (D-DE)
- Howard Dean, former chair of Democratic National Committee, former governor of Vermont, and former lieutenant governor of Vermont
- Eileen Donahoe, former U.S. ambassador to United Nations Human Rights Council
- Karl Eikenberry, former U.S. ambassador to Afghanistan
- Doug Hickey, commissioner general of USA Pavilion at Expo 2015
- Ro Khanna, U.S. representative (D-CA-17)
- Ted Lieu, U.S. representative (D-CA-33)
- John Roos, former U.S. ambassador to Japan
- Adam Schiff, U.S. representative (D-CA-28)
- Jackie Speier, U.S. representative (D-CA-14)

State legislators

- Marc Berman, California assemblymember (D-24)
- Henry Stern, California state senator (D-27)

Local officials

- Roberta Achtenberg, former member of San Francisco Board of Supervisors
- Jeff Adachi, San Francisco public defender
- Tom Butt, mayor of Richmond, California
- Bevan Dufty, former member of San Francisco Board of Supervisors
- Tim Farley, Contra Costa Community College District vice president
- Bob Foster, former mayor of Long Beach, California
- Abe Friedman, former mayor of Piedmont, California
- Josh Fryday, mayor of Novato, California
- Matt Haney, member of San Francisco Board of Education
- Tom McCormick, former mayor of Orinda, California
- Sarah Pearson, pediatrician and president of Piedmont Board of Education
- Gabriel Quinto, mayor pro tem of El Cerrito
- Susan Wengraf, Berkeley councilmember

Community leaders and activists

- Sergio C. Garcia, California attorney and first undocumented immigrant admitted to the State Bar of California
- Debi Hemmeter, co-founder of LeanIn.Org
- Thelton Henderson, first African-American lawyer in the United States Department of Justice Civil Rights Division and senior United States district judge of the United States District Court for the Northern District of California
- Drucilla Ramey, chair of Equal Rights Advocates board of directors
- Amy Rao, vice chair of Human Rights Watch
- Lateefah Simon, president of Akonadi Foundation and member of Bay Area Rapid Transit District board of directors
- Esta Soler, founder of Futures Without Violence
- Evan Wolfson, founder and president of Freedom to Marry

Tech leaders

- Sean Parker, co-founder of Napster and first president of Facebook
Cole Harris

Individuals

- Dante Acosta, member of the California State Assembly
- Joel Anderson, California State Senator
- Kathryn Barger, Los Angeles County supervisor
- Patricia Bates, California Senate minority leader
- Frank Bigelow, member of the California State Assembly
- Rocky Chávez, member of the California State Assembly
- Phillip Chen, member of the California State Assembly
- Steven Choi, member of the California State Assembly
- Jordan Cunningham, member of the California State Assembly
- Brian Dahle, California Assembly minority leader
- Carl DeMaio, former San Diego city councilman
- Heath Flora, member of the California State Assembly
- Jean Fuller, California state senator
- James Gallagher, member of the California State Assembly
- Matthew Harper, member of the California State Assembly
- Kevin Kiley, member of the California State Assembly
- Tom Lackey, member of the California State Assembly
- Devon Mathis, member of the California State Assembly
- Chad Mayes, member of the California State Assembly
- Melissa Melendez, member of the California State Assembly
- Mike Morrell, California state senator
- Jim Nielsen, California state senator
- Michelle Park Steel, Orange County supervisor
- Marc Steinorth, member of the California State Assembly
- Jeff Stone, California state senator
- Andy Vidak, California state senator
- Marie Waldron, member of the California State Assembly

Organizations

- California Republican Party

Newspapers

- Santa Barbara News-Press
David Hernandez

Individuals

- Dan Faller, president and CEO of Apartment Owners Association of California, Inc.
- Charlotte Laws, activist and actress
- Henry Lozano, former advisor to George W. Bush

Organizations

- Apartment Owners Association of California
- Business Environmental Coalition
- Southern California Republican Women and Men

Local officials

- David Berger, deputy district attorney for Los Angeles County
- Jim Desmond, mayor of San Marcos
Ed Hernandez

Federal officials

- Karen Bass, U.S. representative (D-CA-37)
- Salud Carbajal, U.S. representative (D-CA-24)
- Judy Chu, U.S. representative (D-CA-27)
- Lou Correa, U.S. representative (D-CA-46)
- Mark DeSaulnier, U.S. representative (D-CA-11)
- Jimmy Gomez, U.S. representative (D-CA-34)
- Ted Lieu, U.S. representative (D-CA-33)
- Alan Lowenthal, U.S. representative (D-CA-47)
- George Miller, former U.S. representative
- Grace Napolitano, U.S. representative (D-CA-32)
- Norma Torres, U.S. representative (D-CA-35)
- Juan Vargas, U.S. representative (D-CA-51)

State officials

- Toni Atkins, California state senator (D-39) and former speaker of the California State Assembly
- Xavier Becerra, attorney general of California
- Cruz Bustamante, former lieutenant governor of California and former Assembly speaker
- Kevin de León, president pro tempore of the California State Senate
- Fabian Nunez, former speaker of the California State Assembly
- Don Perata, former president of the California State Senate
- John Pérez, former speaker of the California State Assembly
- Anthony Rendon, speaker of the California State Assembly
- Tom Torlakson, California state superintendent of public instruction
- Betty Yee, California state controller

State legislators

- Cecilia Aguiar-Curry, California state assemblymember (D-4)
- Ben Allen, California state senator (D-26)
- Jim Beall, California state senator (D-15)
- Rob Bonta, California state assemblymember (D-18)
- Steven Bradford, California state senator (D-35)
- Anna Caballero, California state assemblymember (D-30)
- Ian Calderon, California state assemblymember (D-57)
- Ed Chau, California state assemblymember (D-49)
- David Chiu, California state assemblymember (D-17)
- Ken Cooley, California state assemblymember (D-8)
- Jim Cooper, California state assemblymember (D-9)
- Bill Dodd, California state senator (D-3)
- Laura Friedman, California state assemblymember (D-43)
- Cathleen Galgiani, California state senator (D-5)
- Eduardo Garcia, California state assemblymember (D-56)
- Mike Gipson, California state assemblymember (D-64)
- Lorena Gonzalez Fletcher, California state assemblymember (D-80)
- Jerry Hill, California state senator (D-13)
- Ben Hueso, California state senator (D-40)
- Reggie Jones-Sawyer, California state assemblymember (D-59)
- Ricardo Lara, California state senator (D-33)
- Connie Leyva, California state senator (D-20)
- Evan Low, California state assemblymember (D-28)
- Mike McGuire, California state senator (D-2)
- Jose Medina, California state assemblymember (D-61)
- Tony Mendoza, California state senator (D-32)
- Holly Mitchell, California state senator (D-30)
- Bill Monning, California state senator (D-17)
- Al Muratsuchi, California state assemblymember (D-66)
- Josh Newman, California state senator (D-29)
- Patrick O'Donnell, California state assemblymember (D-70)
- Fran Pavley, former California state senator
- Anthony Portantino, California state senator (D-25)
- Bill Quirk, California state assemblymember (D-20)
- Sharon Quirk-Silva, California state assemblymember (D-65)
- Eloise Reyes, California state assemblymember (D-47)
- Freddie Rodriguez, California state assemblymember (D-52)
- Richard Roth, California state senator (D-31)
- Rudy Salas, California state assemblymember (D-32)
- Miguel Santiago, California state assemblymember (D-53)
- Henry Stern, California state senator (D-27)
- Tony Thurmond, California state assemblymember (D-15)
- Phil Ting, California state assemblymember (D-19)
- Scott Wiener, California state senator (D-11)
- Lois Wolk, former California state senator
- Jim Wood, California state assemblymember (D-2)
Eleni Kounalakis

Executive branch officials

- Kamala Harris, U.S. senator (D-CA)
- Barack Obama, 44th president of the United States

U.S. representatives

- Nanette Barragán, U.S. representative (D-CA-44)
- Anna Eshoo, U.S. representative (D-CA-18)
- Zoe Lofgren, U.S. representative (D-CA-19)
- Carolyn Maloney, U.S. representative (D-NY-12)
- Doris Matsui, U.S. representative (D-CA-6)
- Kevin McCarty, California assemblymember (D-7)
- Jerry McNerney, U.S. representative (D-CA-9)
- Jimmy Panetta, U.S. representative (D-CA-20)
- John Sarbanes, U.S. representative (D-MD-3)
- Eric Swalwell, U.S. representative (D-CA-15)
- Mike Thompson, U.S. representative (D-CA-5)

Federal officials

- Colleen Bell, former U.S. ambassador
- Shelly Berkley, former U.S. congresswoman
- Nicholas Burns, former U.S. ambassador to NATO
- Mike McFaul, former U.S. ambassador
- Ellen Tauscher, former undersecretary of state and U.S. congresswoman

State officials

- Phil Angelides, former California state treasurer
- John Burton, former state senator and California Democratic Party chair
- Chuck Carpenter, former Contra Costa County Democratic Party chair
- Michael Dukakis, former Massachusetts governor
- Jennifer Granholm, former Michigan governor
- Mark Leno, former state senator
- Lloyd Levine, former California State Assembly member
- Sally Lieber, former Assembly speaker pro tem
- Blanca Rubio, California State Assembly member

Local officials

- Art Agnos, former San Francisco mayor
- Michela Alioto-Pier, former San Francisco supervisor
- Scott Alvord, Roseville City Council member
- Emily Beach, Burlingame City Council member
- Lou Blanas, former Sacramento County sheriff
- David Campos, former San Francisco supervisor
- Catherine Carlton, Menlo Park City Council member
- Marie Chuang, Hillsborough mayor
- Mark Farrell, San Francisco supervisor
- Christina Fugazi, Stockton City Council member
- Jim Gonzalez, former San Francisco supervisor
- James Gore, Sonoma supervisor
- Mary Jane Griego, Olivehurst Public Utility District chair
- Heidi Hall, Nevada County supervisor
- Cecily Harris, Midpeninsula Regional Open Space District board member
- Vicki Hennessey, San Francisco sheriff
- Dennis Herrera, San Francisco city attorney
- Sam Hindi, Foster City mayor
- Kerri Howell, Folsom City vice mayor
- Ardashes "Ardy" Kassakhian, Glendale city clerk
- Leslie Katz, former San Francisco supervisor
- Teddy Gray King, Piedmont City Council member
- Ed Lee, former mayor of San Francisco (deceased)
- Wayne J. Lee, Millbrae City Council member
- Joey Luiz, former City of Clearlake mayor
- Steve Ly, Elk Grove mayor
- Fiona Ma, Board of Equalization member
- John Marquez, Contra Costa Community College District board trustee
- Shelly Masur, Redwood City Council member
- Julia Mates, Belmont Planning Commission chair
- Anu Natarajan, former Fremont City Council member
- David Onek, former San Francisco Police commissioner
- Karl Ory, Chico City Council member
- Diane Papan, San Mateo City Council member
- Gina Papan, Millbrae mayor
- Tom Pratt, Vallecito Union School Board vice chair
- Don Saylor, Yolo County supervisor
- Libby Schaaf, mayor of Oakland
- Thea Selby, president of the San Francisco Community College Board
- Phil Serna, Sacramento County supervisor
- Esmeralda Soria, Fresno City Council president
- Darrell Steinberg, mayor of Sacramento
- Charles Stone, Belmont mayor
- Caroline Torosis, City of Santa Monica Rent Control Board commissioner
- Larry S. Tract, Florin County Water District chair & director
- Michael Tubbs, Stockton mayor

Organizations

- California Federation of Teachers
- California League of Conservation Voters
- California National Organization for Women (NOW)
- California Women's List
- California Young Democrats Black Caucus
- California's Legislative Women's Caucus
- EMILY's List
- Equality California
- Fresno County Young Democrats
- Marin County Young Democrats
- NARAL Pro-Choice California
- National Women's Political Caucus
- Northern California Carpenters Regional Council
- Porterville Democratic Club
- Riverside County Young Democrats
- Sacramento County Young Democrats
- San Fernando Valley Young Democrats
- SEIU Local 2579 - Employees Union
- Stonewall Young Democrats
- Tulare County Stonewall Democrats
- Ventura County Young Democrats

Community leaders and activists

- Willie Adams, International Longshore and Warehouse Union (ILWU) secretary-treasurer
- Norma Alcala, trustee of the Washington Unified School District
- Maria Alegria, chair, Democratic Party of Contra Costa County
- Panorea Avdis, director of the Governor's Office of Business and Economic Development
- Prameela Bartholomeusz, finance director, Santa Clara County Democratic Central Committee
- Sascha Bittner, activist
- Nancy Bui-Thompson, board of directors, SMUD
- Teri Burns, member, Natomas Unified School District
- Robert Camacho
- Amy Champ, regional director, Region 4 and Gold Country Vice Chair, Rural Caucus of the California Democratic Party*
- Norman Chramoff, co-chair, CA Democratic Party Platform Committee*
- Judy Y. Chu, Ed.D., Stanford University early childhood development expert
- Deborah Cunningham-Skurnik, Region 18 chair, California Democratic Party
- Kath Delaney
- Andrea Dew Steele, president of Emerge*
- Baljinder Dhillon, Sutter County Board of Education superintendent
- Robert W. Duggleby, MA, MS, colonel, United States Army (Ret.)
- Kara Dukakis, director, Too Small to Fail*
- Andrew Ertl
- Grace Espindola, North Valley Hispanic Chamber of Commerce
- Linda Fadeke-Richardson, commissioner, San Francisco Treasure Island Development Authority
- Marla Fields, president, Sustainable Novato
- Orlando Fuentes, board member, Cosumnes CSD
- Susan Gutowsky, president, Placer Women Democrats
- Kevin Hendrick, former delegate chair of Del Norte
- Luke Heslip, president, Marin County Young Democrats
- Brodie Hilp, member, San Ramon Valley Democratic Club & Democratic Party of Contra Costa County
- Alice A. Huffman, DNC member
- Jenita Johnson Rodriguez, Northern Central vice chair, Rural Caucus
- Carol Keavney, president, Democratic Women's Council of the Conejo Valley
- Hene Kelly, chair, California Democratic Party Disabilities Caucus
- Susan Kennedy, founder and CEO of Advanced MicroGrid Solutions
- Laura Lowell, chair, Calaveras County Democratic Central Committee
- Dennis Mangers, Sacramento LGBT community leader
- Debbie Mesloh, co-chair, Bay Area Women's Summit*
- William Monroe, California Democratic Party Region 12 director
- Bob Mulholland, Democratic advisor
- Jocelyn Navarro, district representative, Sacramento City Council
- Michael Pappas, executive director of the San Francisco Interfaith Council
- Christine Pelosi, chair, California Democratic Party Women's Caucus
- Neil Pople, president, Natomas Democratic Club
- Tom Pratt, president, Fine Arts Coverage Enterprises
- Susan Rowe, chief vice chair, Rural Caucus
- Michael Sestak, Sestak Lighting Design
- Deepa Sharma, Northern California Outreach chair, Asian Pacific Islander Caucus, California Democratic Party
- Genevieve Shiroma, board of directors, SMUD
- Tiffany Shlain, filmmaker and founder of 50/50
- Andrea Shorter, commissioner, Commission on the Status of Women
- Silissa Vriarte Smith, AD70 California Democratic Party delegate
- Julie D. Soo, co-chair, CA Democratic Party Platform Committee*, commissioner, San Francisco Commission on the Status of Women*
- Lynne Standard-Nightengale, chair, Amador County Democrats
- Admiral James Stavridis, dean of Fletcher School of Law and Diplomacy
- Kerry Stoebner, DCCM member
- Dave Tamayo, board of directors, SMUD
- Susie Tompkins Buell, activist and philanthropist
- Jim Wunderman, president and CEO, Bay Area Council*
*Titles for identification purposes only
Gayle McLaughlin

State officials

- Tom Ammiano, former member of the California State Assembly
- David Zuckerman, lt. governor of Vermont

Local officials

- Jesse Arreguin, mayor of Berkeley
- Matt Gonzalez, former president of San Francisco Board of Supervisors
- Heidi Harmon, mayor of San Luis Obispo
- Gus Newport, former mayor of Berkeley

Individuals

- Jimmy Dore, The Jimmy Dore Show
- Ralph Nader, consumer advocate, environmentalist
- Norman Solomon, co-founder and national coordinator, RootsAction.org
- Winnie Wong, co-founder, The People for Bernie Sanders

Organizations

- Bernie Sanders' Our Revolution National
- California for Bernie Sanders 2020
- Delegates and Friends for Bernie 2016
- Democratic Socialists of America
- East Bay Democratic Socialists of America
- Green Party of Contra Costa
- Green Party of Humboldt County
- Green Party of Riverside County
- Green Party of San Diego
- Green Party of Santa Clara County
- Green Party of Solano County
- Green Party of Ventura County
- Green Party of Yolo County
- Humboldt State University Greens
- Los Angeles Democratic Socialists of America
- Movement for a People's Party
- The New Progressives of Del Norte
- Orange County Democratic Socialists of America
- Our Revolution Alameda Progressives
- Our Revolution Contra Costa
- Our Revolution Cupertino De Anza Political Revolution
- Our Revolution Democracy Project LA
- Our Revolution East Bay (San Francisco Bay Area)
- Our Revolution F.U.N. Progressives (Fremont, Union City, Newark)
- Our Revolution Humboldt (Courageous Resistance of Humboldt)
- Our Revolution Indian Rock
- Our Revolution Inland Empire
- Our Revolution Lake County
- Our Revolution Long Beach
- Our Revolution Los Angeles Greens
- Our Revolution Monterey County
- Our Revolution Mountain View (NorCal4OurRevolution)
- Our Revolution North Bay (Petaluma-Sonoma)
- Our Revolution North County San Diego
- Our Revolution Richmond (Richmond Progressive Alliance)
- Our Revolution Riverside
- Our Revolution San Clemente
- Our Revolution San Francisco (SF Berniecrats)
- Our Revolution San Joaquin County
- Our Revolution San Jose (Democratic Socialists of America chapter)
- Our Revolution San Leandro
- Our Revolution Santa Clarita Valley
- Our Revolution Santa Cruz (Santa Cruz for Bernie)
- Our Revolution Santa Maria Progressives
- Our Revolution Silicon Valley (Democratic Socialists of America chapter)
- Our Revolution South Bay Los Angeles
- Our Revolution UC Berkeley (Progressive Student Association for Bernie)
- Our Revolution Ventura County
- Our Revolution Watsonville
- Our Revolution West Marin
- Our Revolution West San Fernando Valley
- Our Revolution Yolo County Progressives
- Peace and Freedom Party
- Pinole Progressive Alliance
- Pomona Valley Democratic Socialists of America
- Public Bank LA
- Revolution Funding
- San Diego Democratic Socialists of America
- San Diego Progressive Alliance
- San Francisco Democratic Socialists of America
- San Francisco Peninsula Democratic Socialists of America
- San Jose Democratic Socialists of America
- Silicon Valley Democratic Socialists of America
- Socialist Alternative
- South Bay Progressive Alliance
- Southern District of California Community Coalition
- UE United Electrical, Radio, and Machine Workers of America Western Region
- Ventura County Activists for Bernie Sanders 2020 #OurRevolution
- Women For Justice

=== Polling ===
Poll source	Date(s) administered	Sample size	Margin of error	Jeff Bleich (D)	Cole Harris (R)	David R. Hernandez (R)	Ed Hernandez (D)	Eleni Kounalakis (D)	Gayle McLaughlin (NPP)	Undecided
YouGov	May 12–24, 2018	1,113	± 4.0%	6%	16%	6%	9%	14%	4%	41%

=== Results ===
Results by county Kounalakis: 30–40%; 20–30%; 10–20%; E. Hernandez: 20–30%; 30–40%; Harris: 20–30%; 30–40%; Fennell: 10–20%

Nonpartisan blanket primary results
Party	Candidate	Votes	%
Democratic	Eleni Kounalakis	1,587,940	24.2%
Democratic	Ed Hernandez	1,347,442	20.6%
Republican	Cole Harris	1,144,003	17.5%
Democratic	Jeff Bleich	648,045	9.9%
Republican	David Fennell	515,956	7.9%
Republican	Lydia Ortega	419,512	6.4%
Republican	David R. Hernandez	404,982	6.2%
No party preference	Gayle McLaughlin	263,364	4.0%
Libertarian	Tim Ferreira	99,949	1.5%
Democratic	Cameron Gharabiklou	78,267	1.2%
No party preference	Danny Thomas	44,121	0.7%
No party preference	Marjan S. Fariba (write-in)	18	0.0%
Total votes		6,553,599	100.0%

==== By county ====
Results by county. Blue represents counties won by Kounalakis and counties with Democratic vote majorities. Red represents counties won by Harris and counties with Republican vote majorities. Cyan represents counties won by Ed Hernandez. Orange represents counties won by Fennell. Light blue represents counties with Democratic vote pluralities. Light red represents counties with Republican vote pluralities.

County	McLaughlin (NPP)	Kounalakis (D)	Ed Hernandez (D)	Bleich (D)	Democratic total	Fennell (R)	Harris (R)	Ortega (R)	David Hernandez (R)	Republican total	Other
Alameda	8.7	31.4	19.0	20.3	71.9%	4.7	6.3	3.2	3.4	17.6%	1.8
Alpine	1.9	25.4	18.4	12.8	58.2%	13.1	10.4	9.1	4.0	36.6%	3.2
Amador	2.2	21.6	10.2	4.4	36.6%	16.1	23.2	9.3	9.5	58.1%	3.0
Butte	4.4	18.8	15.6	6.4	42.7%	12.1	21.5	9.5	6.9	50.0%	2.9
Calaveras	2.4	20.2	12.0	4.5	37.3%	17.8	21.7	9.3	8.2	57.0%	3.3
Colusa	2.0	14.4	13.8	3.7	33.1%	20.3	24.2	9.5	7.4	61.4%	3.3
Contra Costa	6.2	26.7	17.4	17.3	62.4%	8.0	11.2	5.6	4.3	29.1%	2.3
Del Norte	4.3	14.8	16.9	5.6	38.4%	16.5	22.3	7.2	8.3	54.3%	3.1
El Dorado	2.5	23.5	11.2	4.9	40.1%	15.2	20.9	11.5	7.4	55.0%	2.5
Fresno	2.6	12.3	19.1	9.2	41.9%	9.6	23.6	12.1	7.7	53.0%	2.6
Glenn	2.2	8.4	10.0	5.0	25.8%	24.2	25.7	8.9	9.3	68.1%	3.8
Humboldt	8.2	25.4	19.5	8.8	55.1%	10.6	13.4	5.6	4.7	34.3%	2.4
Imperial	1.9	9.1	33.5	8.8	53.1%	11.9	12.2	8.1	10.0	42.2%	2.8
Inyo	3.5	16.5	15.1	6.6	39.2%	15.8	22.2	8.3	7.5	53.8%	3.5
Kern	1.9	9.7	15.3	6.3	34.4%	13.5	35.2	8.0	6.4	63.1%	2.6
Kings	2.1	7.6	19.2	6.0	33.2%	12.6	26.2	14.2	8.8	61.8%	2.5
Lake	4.3	25.6	10.7	13.1	50.5%	11.6	18.0	7.4	5.8	42.8%	2.6
Lassen	1.7	9.2	10.7	3.9	24.5%	18.3	30.7	10.9	11.7	70.6%	2.4
Los Angeles	4.1	27.4	28.9	7.1	64.7%	4.9	12.9	5.4	6.1	29.3%	1.9
Madera	2.1	9.0	18.4	5.1	33.3%	17.0	29.6	7.7	7.6	59.9%	2.8
Marin	5.2	32.2	16.3	25.5	74.6%	3.8	6.4	6.3	2.0	18.5	1.6
Mariposa	3.4	14.1	15.8	5.6	36.2%	18.0	24.0	7.2	8.3	57.5%	2.9
Mendocino	7.4	30.4	16.5	14.1	62.3%	7.4	10.7	5.2	4.7	28.0%	2.4
Merced	2.8	12.0	22.0	7.6	42.9%	9.9	23.1	10.6	7.3	50.9%	3.5
Modoc	2.6	8.2	9.0	4.3	22.3%	22.7	27.2	10.4	12.3	72.6%	2.4
Mono	3.9	18.9	18.7	11.6	50.0%	14.5	16.2	6.9	5.9	43.5%	2.7
Monterey	2.8	26.7	24.8	9.5	61.8%	5.4	18.2	5.3	4.6	34.5%	1.9
Napa	3.0	30.0	17.3	13.9	61.7%	11.1	10.6	5.3	4.9	31.9%	3.2
Nevada	4.4	30.7	10.6	8.3	50.1%	12.0	17.9	7.7	5.8	43.4%	2.2
Orange	2.3	18.5	19.8	5.7	45.2%	8.3	25.4	7.5	9.1	50.3%	2.2
Placer	2.2	24.0	11.4	5.1	41.1%	9.0	28.7	9.4	6.9	54.0%	2.7
Plumas	3.0	23.3	9.2	5.4	38.5%	17.8	16.9	10.9	10.2	55.8%	2.7
Riverside	2.0	16.6	20.8	5.8	44.1%	10.8	26.0	6.7	8.5	52.0%	1.9
Sacramento	3.0	31.4	17.2	7.2	56.6%	8.5	14.9	7.1	7.5	38.0%	2.4
San Benito	2.9	23.3	21.8	6.2	52.0%	9.2	15.0	8.6	9.6	42.5%	2.6
San Bernardino	2.4	16.6	22.3	4.3	44.5%	9.2	24.2	7.2	10.4	51.0%	2.1
San Diego	3.0	20.8	18.9	10.1	51.4%	7.3	24.5	6.7	5.2	43.7%	1.9
San Francisco	18.0	29.0	17.5	20.8	68.2%	2.5	4.9	3.2	2.3	12.9%	0.9
San Luis Obispo	3.5	27.6	15.1	5.8	49.7%	11.0	22.1	6.7	5.4	44.2%	2.6
San Joaquin	2.2	24.9	17.6	5.2	49.2%	9.6	21.3	8.1	7.0	46.0%	2.6
San Mateo	4.1	34.2	16.5	19.8	71.5%	6.4	8.5	5.0	2.4	22.3%	2.1
Santa Barbara	2.9	25.9	21.5	6.7	55.0%	9.2	18.5	6.7	5.4	39.8%	2.3
Santa Clara	3.1	28.3	18.3	19.8	68.0%	7.3	9.9	4.9	4.5	26.6%	2.3
Santa Cruz	5.9	34.7	22.8	12.2	70.6%	4.6	9.0	5.3	2.8	21.7%	1.8
Shasta	2.7	10.9	12.3	6.0	30.1%	19.0	25.4	9.4	10.5	64.3%	2.9
Sierra	5.8	21.4	7.7	5.4	35.0%	16.5	21.2	11.0	7.4	55.1%	4.1
Siskiyou	4.5	15.3	13.3	8.1	37.1%	19.4	18.4	8.9	8.2	54.9%	3.5
Solano	3.4	28.7	16.8	10.0	57.5%	10.9	11.9	7.5	5.4	38.7%	3.3
Sonoma	5.5	34.4	17.2	15.1	67.7%	5.8	9.6	5.8	3.6	24.8%	2.0
Stanislaus	2.0	22.2	16.7	6.3	46.1%	12.5	23.2	7.2	6.4	49.3%	2.6
Sutter	1.6	14.8	12.9	4.3	35.6%	12.0	31.1	8.6	7.6	59.3%	3.5
Tehama	2.4	8.5	13.3	3.7	27.4%	20.2	26.7	9.0	11.3	67.2%	3.1
Trinity	4.2	16.1	16.1	6.5	40.1%	17.7	14.6	10.4	9.2	51.9%	3.8
Tulare	1.6	7.7	21.1	4.7	34.0%	11.9	33.9	7.5	8.0	61.0%	3.1
Tuolumne	2.8	22.1	11.2	5.1	39.2%	20.2	19.0	8.2	8.0	55.4%	2.7
Ventura	3.0	22.1	21.6	6.7	51.2%	11.2	18.9	6.2	7.1	43.4%	2.4
Yolo	4.1	33.0	21.1	8.9	64.0%	6.8	12.4	6.0	4.0	29.2%	2.6
Yuba	2.6	15.8	12.0	3.5	33.1%	17.3	27.9	7.4	8.1	60.7%	3.6
Total	4.0	24.2	20.6	9.9	55.8%	7.9	17.5	6.4	6.2	38.0%	2.2

== General election ==
=== Endorsements ===
Ed Hernandez (D)

Federal officials

- Karen Bass, U.S. representative (D-CA-37)
- Salud Carbajal, U.S. representative (D-CA-24)
- Judy Chu, U.S. representative (D-CA-27)
- Lou Correa, U.S. representative (D-CA-46)
- Mark DeSaulnier, U.S. representative (D-CA-11)
- Jimmy Gomez, U.S. representative (D-CA-34)
- Ted Lieu, U.S. representative (D-CA-33)
- Alan Lowenthal, U.S. representative (D-CA-47)
- George Miller, former U.S. representative
- Grace Napolitano, U.S. representative (D-CA-32)
- Norma Torres, U.S. representative (D-CA-35)
- Juan Vargas, U.S. representative (D-CA-51)

State officials

- Toni Atkins, California state senator (D-39) and former speaker of the California State Assembly
- Xavier Becerra, attorney general of California
- Cruz Bustamante, former lieutenant governor of California and former Assembly speaker
- Kevin de León, president pro tempore of the California State Senate
- Fabian Nunez, former speaker of the California State Assembly
- Don Perata, former president of the California State Senate
- John Pérez, former speaker of the California State Assembly
- Anthony Rendon, speaker of the California State Assembly
- Tom Torlakson, California state superintendent of public instruction
- Betty Yee, California state controller

State legislators

- Cecilia Aguiar-Curry, California state assemblymember (D-4)
- Ben Allen, California state senator (D-26)
- Jim Beall, California state senator (D-15)
- Rob Bonta, California state assemblymember (D-18)
- Steven Bradford, California state senator (D-35)
- Anna Caballero, California state assemblymember (D-30)
- Ian Calderon, California state assemblymember (D-57)
- Ed Chau, California state assemblymember (D-49)
- David Chiu, California state assemblymember (D-17)
- Ken Cooley, California state assemblymember (D-8)
- Jim Cooper, California state assemblymember (D-9)
- Bill Dodd, California state senator (D-3)
- Laura Friedman, California state assemblymember (D-43)
- Cathleen Galgiani, California state senator (D-5)
- Eduardo Garcia, California state assemblymember (D-56)
- Mike Gipson, California state assemblymember (D-64)
- Lorena Gonzalez Fletcher, California state assemblymember (D-80)
- Jerry Hill, California state senator (D-13)
- Ben Hueso, California state senator (D-40)
- Reggie Jones-Sawyer, California state assemblymember (D-59)
- Ricardo Lara, California state senator (D-33)
- Connie Leyva, California state senator (D-20)
- Evan Low, California state assemblymember (D-28)
- Mike McGuire, California state senator (D-2)
- Jose Medina, California state assemblymember (D-61)
- Tony Mendoza, California state senator (D-32)
- Holly Mitchell, California state senator (D-30)
- Bill Monning, California state senator (D-17)
- Al Muratsuchi, California state assemblymember (D-66)
- Josh Newman, California state senator (D-29)
- Patrick O'Donnell, California state assemblymember (D-70)
- Fran Pavley, former California state senator
- Anthony Portantino, California state senator (D-25)
- Bill Quirk, California state assemblymember (D-20)
- Sharon Quirk-Silva, California state assemblymember (D-65)
- Eloise Reyes, California state assemblymember (D-47)
- Freddie Rodriguez, California state assemblymember (D-52)
- Richard Roth, California state senator (D-31)
- Rudy Salas, California state assemblymember (D-32)
- Miguel Santiago, California state assemblymember (D-53)
- Henry Stern, California state senator (D-27)
- Tony Thurmond, California state assemblymember (D-15)
- Phil Ting, California state assemblymember (D-19)
- Scott Wiener, California state senator (D-11)
- Lois Wolk, former California state senator
- Jim Wood, California state assemblymember (D-2)
Eleni Kounalakis (D)

Executive branch officials

- Kamala Harris, U.S. senator (D-CA)
- Barack Obama, 44th president of the United States

Federal officials

- Nanette Barragán, U.S. representative (D-CA-44)
- Colleen Bell, former U.S. ambassador
- Shelly Berkley, former U.S. congresswoman
- Nicholas Burns, former U.S. ambassador to NATO
- Anna Eshoo, U.S. representative (D-CA-18)
- Zoe Lofgren, U.S. representative (D-CA-19)
- Carolyn Maloney, U.S. representative (D-NY-12)
- Doris Matsui, U.S. representative (D-CA-6)
- Mike McFaul, former U.S. ambassador
- Jerry McNerney, U.S. representative (D-CA-9)
- Jimmy Panetta, U.S. representative (D-CA-20)
- John Sarbanes, U.S. representative (D-MD-3)
- Eric Swalwell, U.S. representative (D-CA-15)
- Ellen Tauscher, former undersecretary of state and U.S. congresswoman
- Mike Thompson, U.S. representative (D-CA-5)

State officials

- Phil Angelides, former California state treasurer
- John Burton, former state senator and California Democratic Party chair
- Chuck Carpenter, former Contra Costa County Democratic Party chair
- Michael Dukakis, former Massachusetts governor
- Jennifer Granholm, former Michigan governor
- Mark Leno, former state senator
- Lloyd Levine, former California State Assembly member
- Sally Lieber, former Assembly speaker pro tem
- Fiona Ma, Board of Equalization member
- Blanca Rubio, California State Assembly member

Local officials

- Art Agnos, former San Francisco mayor
- Michela Alioto-Pier, former San Francisco supervisor
- Scott Alvord, Roseville City Council member
- Emily Beach, Burlingame City Council member
- Lou Blanas, former Sacramento County sheriff
- David Campos, former San Francisco supervisor
- Catherine Carlton, Menlo Park City Council member
- Marie Chuang, Hillsborough mayor
- Mark Farrell, San Francisco supervisor
- Christina Fugazi, Stockton City Council member
- Jim Gonzalez, former San Francisco supervisor
- James Gore, Sonoma supervisor
- Mary Jane Griego, Olivehurst Public Utility district chair
- Heidi Hall, Nevada County supervisor
- Cecily Harris, Midpeninsula Regional Open Space District board member
- Vicki Hennessey, San Francisco sheriff
- Dennis Herrera, San Francisco city attorney
- Sam Hindi, Foster City mayor
- Kerri Howell, Folsom City vice mayor
- Ardashes "Ardy" Kassakhian, Glendale city clerk
- Leslie Katz, former San Francisco supervisor
- Teddy Gray King, Piedmont City Council member
- Ed Lee, former mayor of San Francisco (deceased)
- Wayne J. Lee, Millbrae City Council member
- Joey Luiz, former City of Clearlake mayor
- Steve Ly, Elk Grove mayor
- Diane Papan, San Mateo City Council member
- Karl Ory, Chico City Council member
- Shelly Masur, Redwood City Council member
- John Marquez, Contra Costa Community College District board trustee
- Julia Mates, Belmont Planning Commission chair
- Kevin McCarty, California assemblymember (D-7)
- Anu Natarajan, former Fremont City Council member
- David Onek, former San Francisco Police commissioner
- Gina Papan, Millbrae mayor
- Tom Pratt, Vallecito Union School Board vice chair
- Don Saylor, Yolo County supervisor
- Libby Schaaf, mayor of Oakland
- Thea Selby, president of the San Francisco Community College Board
- Phil Serna, Sacramento County supervisor
- Esmeralda Soria, Fresno City Council president
- Darrell Steinberg, mayor of Sacramento
- Charles Stone, Belmont mayor
- Caroline Torosis, City of Santa Monica Rent Control Board commissioner
- Larry S. Tract, Florin County Water District chair & director
- Michael Tubbs, Stockton mayor

Organizations

- California Federation of Teachers
- California League of Conservation Voters
- California National Organization for Women (NOW)
- California Women's List
- California Young Democrats Black Caucus
- California's Legislative Women's Caucus
- EMILY's List
- Equality California
- Fresno County Young Democrats
- Marin County Young Democrats
- NARAL Pro-Choice California
- National Women's Political Caucus
- Northern California Carpenters Regional Council
- Porterville Democratic Club
- Riverside County Young Democrats
- Sacramento County Young Democrats
- San Fernando Valley Young Democrats
- SEIU Local 2579 - Employees Union
- Stonewall Young Democrats
- Tulare County Stonewall Democrats
- Ventura County Young Democrats

Community leaders and activists

- Willie Adams, International Longshore and Warehouse Union (ILWU) secretary-treasurer
- Norma Alcala, trustee of the Washington Unified School District
- Maria Alegria, chair ofhe Democratic Party of Contra Costa County
- Panorea Avdis, director of the Governor's Office of Business and Economic Development
- Prameela Bartholomeusz, finance director, Santa Clara County Democratic Central Committee
- Sascha Bittner, activist
- Nancy Bui-Thompson, board of directors, SMUD
- Teri Burns, member, Natomas Unified School District
- Robert Camacho
- Amy Champ, regional director, Region 4 and Gold Country vice-chair, Rural Caucus of the California Democratic Party*
- Norman Chramoff, co-chair, CA Democratic Party Platform Committee*
- Judy Y. Chu, Ed.D., Stanford University early childhood development expert
- Deborah Cunningham-Skurnik, Region 18 chair, California Democratic Party
- Andrea Dew Steele, president of Emerge*
- Kath Delaney
- Baljinder Dhillon, Sutter County Board of Education superintendent
- Kara Dukakis, director, Too Small to Fail*
- Robert W. Duggleby, MA, MS, colonel, United States Army (Ret.)
- Andrew Ertl
- Grace Espindola, North Valley Hispanic Chamber of Commerce
- Linda Fadeke-Richardson, commissioner, San Francisco Treasure Island Development Authority
- Marla Fields, president, Sustainable Novato
- Orlando Fuentes, board member, Cosumnes CSD
- Susan Gutowsky, president, Placer Women Democrats
- Luke Heslip, president, Marin County Young Democrats
- Kevin Hendrick, former delegate chair of Del Norte
- Brodie Hilp, member, San Ramon Valley Democratic Club & Democratic Party of Contra Costa County
- Alice A. Huffman, DNC member
- Jenita Johnson Rodriguez, Northern Central vice chair, Rural Caucus
- Carol Keavney, president, Democratic Women's Council of the Conejo Valley
- Hene Kelly, chair, California Democratic Party Disabilities Caucus
- Susan Kennedy, founder & CEO of Advanced MicroGrid Solutions
- Laura Lowell, chair, Calaveras County Democratic Central Committee
- Dennis Mangers, Sacramento LGBT community leader
- Debbie Mesloh, co-chair, Bay Area Women's Summit*
- William Monroe, California Democratic Party Region 12 Director
- Bob Mulholland, Democratic Advisor
- Jocelyn Navarro, district representative, Sacramento City Council
- Michael Pappas, executive director of the San Francisco Interfaith Council
- Christine Pelosi, chair, California Democratic Party Women's Caucus
- Neil Pople, president, Natomas Democratic Club
- Tom Pratt, president, Fine Arts Coverage Enterprises
- Susan Rowe, chief vice chair, Rural Caucus
- Genevieve Shiroma, board of directors, SMUD
- Michael Sestak, Sestak Lighting Design
- Deepa Sharma, Northern California outreach chair, Asian Pacific Islander Caucus, California Democratic Party
- Tiffany Shlain, filmmaker & founder of 50/50
- Andrea Shorter, commissioner, Commission on the Status of Women
- Silissa Vriarte Smith, AD70 California Democratic Party delegate
- Julie D. Soo, co-chair, CA Democratic Party Platform Committee*, commissioner, San Francisco Commission on the Status of Women*
- Lynne Standard-Nightengale, chair, Amador County Democrats
- Admiral James Stavridis, dean of Fletcher School of Law and Diplomacy
- Kerry Stoebner, DCCM member
- Dave Tamayo, board of directors, SMUD
- Susie Tompkins Buell, activist and philanthropist
- Jim Wunderman, president and CEO, Bay Area Council*
Titles for identification purposes only*

=== Polling ===
View source data.

Poll source	Date(s) administered	Sample size	Margin of error	Ed Hernandez (D)	Eleni Kounalakis (D)	None	Undecided
Thomas Partners Strategies	October 25–27, 2018	1,068	± 3.5%	34%	34%	–	32%
UC Berkeley	October 19–26, 2018	1,339	± 4.0%	31%	45%	–	24%
YouGov	October 10–24, 2018	2,178	± 3.1%	19%	32%	22%	28%
Thomas Partners Strategies	October 18–20, 2018	1,068	± 3.5%	29%	34%	–	37%
Thomas Partners Strategies	October 12–14, 2018	1,068	± 3.5%	26%	26%	–	48%
Thomas Partners Strategies	October 5–7, 2018	1,068	± 3.5%	24%	30%	–	46%
Thomas Partners Strategies	September 28–30, 2018	1,068	± 3.5%	22%	24%	–	54%
Thomas Partners Strategies	September 21–23, 2018	1,068	± 3.5%	27%	27%	–	46%
Thomas Partners Strategies	September 14–16, 2018	1,040	± 3.5%	18%	15%	–	67%
Thomas Partners Strategies	September 7–9, 2018	1,227	± 3.3%	18%	16%	–	66%

=== Results ===
2018 California lieutenant gubernatorial election
Party	Candidate	Votes	%
Democratic	Eleni Kounalakis	5,914,068	56.55%
Democratic	Ed Hernandez	4,543,863	43.45%
Total votes		10,457,931	100.00%
Democratic hold			

==== By county ====
Blue represents counties won by Kounalakis. Cyan represents counties won by Hernandez.

County	Eleni Kounalakis (D)		Ed Hernandez (D)		Margin		Total
County	Votes	%	Votes	%	Votes	%	Votes
Alameda	316,658	61.68	196,722	38.32	119,936	23.36	513,380
Alpine	314	66.24	160	33.76	154	32.49	474
Amador	7,834	61.52	4,901	38.48	2,933	23.03	12,735
Butte	41,533	60.43	27,196	39.57	14,337	20.86	68,729
Calaveras	9,734	62.76	5,775	37.24	3,959	25.53	15,509
Colusa	2,123	50.87	2,050	49.13	73	1.75	4,173
Contra Costa	222,978	60.90	143,152	39.10	79,826	21.80	366,130
Del Norte	3,586	57.70	2,629	42.30	957	15.40	6,215
El Dorado	41,662	64.86	22,576	35.14	19,086	29.71	64,238
Fresno	105,036	51.64	98,361	48.36	6,675	3.28	203,397
Glenn	2,910	48.99	3,030	51.01	-120	-2.02	5,940
Humboldt	26,301	59.95	17,568	40.05	8,733	19.91	43,869
Imperial	10,826	37.33	18,177	62.67	-7,351	-25.35	29,003
Inyo	2,953	56.14	2,307	43.86	646	12.28	5,260
Kern	83,012	53.99	70,734	46.01	12,278	7.99	153,746
Kings	11,128	47.68	12,210	52.32	-1,082	-4.64	23,338
Lake	10,608	61.61	6,610	38.39	3,998	23.22	17,218
Lassen	3,013	50.80	2,918	49.20	95	1.60	5,931
Los Angeles	1,338,599	51.19	1,276,564	48.81	62,035	2.37	2,615,163
Madera	13,853	47.44	15,349	52.56	-1,496	-5.12	29,202
Marin	69,699	62.24	42,290	37.76	27,409	24.47	111,989
Mariposa	3,405	57.34	2,533	42.66	872	14.69	5,938
Mendocino	17,679	62.32	10,687	37.68	6,992	24.65	28,366
Merced	21,986	46.22	25,579	53.78	-3,593	-7.55	47,565
Modoc	1,167	52.26	1,066	47.74	101	4.52	2,233
Mono	2,155	56.40	1,666	43.60	489	12.80	3,821
Monterey	63,265	62.55	37,871	37.45	25,394	25.11	101,136
Napa	29,330	61.23	18,575	38.77	10,755	22.45	47,905
Nevada	28,283	67.70	13,495	32.30	14,788	35.40	41,778
Orange	463,979	53.53	402,773	46.47	61,206	7.06	866,752
Placer	87,514	67.37	42,381	32.63	45,133	34.75	129,895
Plumas	3,901	62.42	2,349	37.58	1,552	24.83	6,250
Riverside	265,991	51.51	250,409	48.49	15,582	3.02	516,400
Sacramento	273,273	63.62	156,250	36.38	117,023	27.24	429,523
San Benito	9,733	57.73	7,127	42.27	2,606	15.46	16,860
San Bernardino	224,804	50.61	219,347	49.39	5,457	1.23	444,151
San Diego	570,795	62.55	341,799	37.45	228,996	25.09	912,594
San Francisco	172,741	52.91	153,733	47.09	19,008	5.82	326,474
San Joaquin	95,660	59.07	66,294	40.93	29,366	18.13	161,954
San Luis Obispo	59,731	61.15	37,952	38.85	21,779	22.30	97,683
San Mateo	158,978	62.79	94,218	37.21	64,760	25.58	253,196
Santa Barbara	75,995	60.58	49,443	39.42	26,552	21.17	125,438
Santa Clara	331,520	62.00	203,178	38.00	128,342	24.00	534,698
Santa Cruz	67,812	64.97	36,561	35.03	31,251	29.94	104,373
Shasta	25,245	52.05	23,256	47.95	1,989	4.10	48,501
Sierra	733	63.46	422	36.54	311	26.93	1,155
Siskiyou	7,057	53.79	6,062	46.21	995	7.58	13,119
Solano	76,558	61.44	48,042	38.56	28,516	22.89	124,600
Sonoma	117,583	64.48	64,774	35.52	52,809	28.96	182,357
Stanislaus	72,406	57.47	53,577	42.53	18,829	14.95	125,983
Sutter	12,712	56.78	9,675	43.22	3,037	13.57	22,387
Tehama	7,581	51.64	7,100	48.36	481	3.28	14,681
Trinity	2,305	56.79	1,754	43.21	551	13.57	4,059
Tulare	39,334	51.10	37,646	48.90	1,688	2.19	76,980
Tuolumne	10,297	61.76	6,375	38.24	3,922	23.52	16,672
Ventura	137,545	55.47	110,435	44.53	27,110	10.93	247,980
Yolo	42,349	65.77	22,040	34.23	20,309	31.54	64,389
Yuba	8,306	57.50	6,140	42.50	2,166	14.99	14,446
Totals	5,914,068	56.55%	4,543,863	43.45%	1,370,205	13.10%	10,457,931

== See also ==
- California gubernatorial election, 2018
- California State Treasurer election, 2018
