= People's Party (United States, 2017) =

US syncretic political organization

- Founded: November 9, 2017; 9 years ago
- Preceded by: Draft Bernie for a People's Party
- Student wing: Students for a People's Party
- Ideology: Populism; Non-interventionism; Historical: Progressivism
- Political position: Syncretic; Historical: Center-left to left-wing
- Politics of the United States; Political parties; Elections; A: Party has variously been described left-wing populist but letting right-wing populists in under a big tent banner.

The People's Party (formerly the Movement for a People's Party, MPP) is a syncretic political organization in the United States which describes itself as having the goal of "forming a major new political party free of corporate money and influence."

Initially a progressive (Note: The People's Party ideology has been disputed, with some commentators describing it as influenced by a variety of ideologies and views such as right-wing populism and vaccine hesitancy.) political organization, Nick Brana formed the party after the 2016 presidential election as a successor to the "Draft Bernie for a People's Party" group. Bernie Sanders declined to be the People's Party's figurehead, instead, seeking the presidential nomination in the 2020 Democratic Party presidential primaries.

In 2023, Brana joined the Robert F. Kennedy Jr. 2024 presidential campaign.

== History ==
In 2017, Nick Brana founded the Movement for a People's Party (MPP) out of the "Draft Bernie for a People's Party" group, which had failed to gain Bernie Sanders's support. Brana had worked on Sanders's 2016 presidential campaign as the National Political Outreach Coordinator.

In September 2017, the group gave an invitation with 50,000 signatures to Sanders to lead the creation of the People's Party, which Sanders ignored.

In August 2020, the organization held a virtual People's Convention that was viewed by 400,000 people on various platforms. Speakers included former Democratic Party 2020 presidential election candidate Marianne Williamson, former Harvard University professor and philosopher Cornel West, Sanders 2020 co-chair Nina Turner, former Minnesota governor Jesse Ventura, comedian/political commentator/satirist Jimmy Dore, journalist Chris Hedges and podcaster Ryan Knight. The convention's purpose was to "vote on forming a major new political party free of corporate money and influence," a measure that was approved by 99% of those viewing the convention online. While many speakers expressed distaste for the candidates in the 2020 presidential election, the party did not contest the election. Brana said that their goal was "to form a party beginning in 2021, to run in the midterms in 2022 and, perhaps, to run a presidential candidate in 2024."

In December 2020, the first People's Party state organization was registered in Maine. According to Michael Sylvester, the party will focus on pushing congressional officials into supporting a floor vote for Medicare for All.

In September 2021, the People's Party gained ballot access in Florida, the first state where it has done so.

In February 2022, Brana was accused of sexual harassment by Zana Day, former MPP executive director, which was corroborated by coworker Paula Jean Swearengin. Brana denied these claims, calling them "false and politically motivated," and accused other MPP board members of a "liberal takeover attempt." As a result, he forced out several MPP board members.

== Election results ==
While the People's Party has never run candidates of its own, it offered its endorsement of two existing candidates' campaigns in 2018. During the 2024 United States presidential election, Cornel West initially launched his presidential campaign as a People's Party candidate, then distanced himself from the party eight days later. The party's founder, Nick Brana, worked on the Robert F. Kennedy Jr. campaign.

=== Presidential elections ===
On June 5, 2023, Cornel West announced his candidacy for president with the People's Party, becoming the first person to run for office under the People's Party banner. Due to the party's controversies and lack of ballot access, West was challenged and criticized by some progressive activists for associating himself with the group. Some progressives called for West to work instead with the Green Party, which has run presidential candidates for decades and has much larger ballot access. At the same time, some Democrats feared that, without ranked-choice voting, a West third-party run might be a "spoiler", diverting swing state votes from the presumptive front-runner, Joe Biden, in favor of the 2024 Republican nominee. On June 14, West announced that he was instead seeking the endorsement of the Green Party. West later changed his affiliation once again to independent.

In April 2023, PP encouraged Robert F. Kennedy Jr. to run as an independent "outside of the corrupt duopoly". In October, Brana began working for Kennedy's presidential campaign. Brana served as Kennedy's "ballot access director." In August 2024, Kennedy suspended his campaign and endorsed Donald Trump.

=== Congressional elections ===
Year	Candidate	Chamber	State	District	Votes	%	Result	Notes	Ref
2018	Tim Canova	House	Florida	23	13,697	5.0%	Lost	ran as No Party Affiliation candidate	

Before the 2022 United States midterm elections, the People's Party announced that it was "aiming to run a dozen or more federal races, including a seat or two in the U.S. Senate." The party, ultimately, did not run any candidates in the 2022 elections.

=== Statewide elections ===
Year	Candidate	Office	State	District	Votes	%	Result	Notes	Ref
2018	Gayle McLaughlin	Lieutenant governor	California	At-Large	263,364	4.0%	Lost	ran as No Party Preference (NPP) candidate; founder of Richmond Progressive Alliance (RPA); endorsed by CNP, DSA, GPCA, OR, PFP, PP, and RPA	

== See also ==
- People's Party (United States, 1892)
- People's Party (United States, 1971)
- Sanders–Trump voters
