= Dan Kalb =

American politician

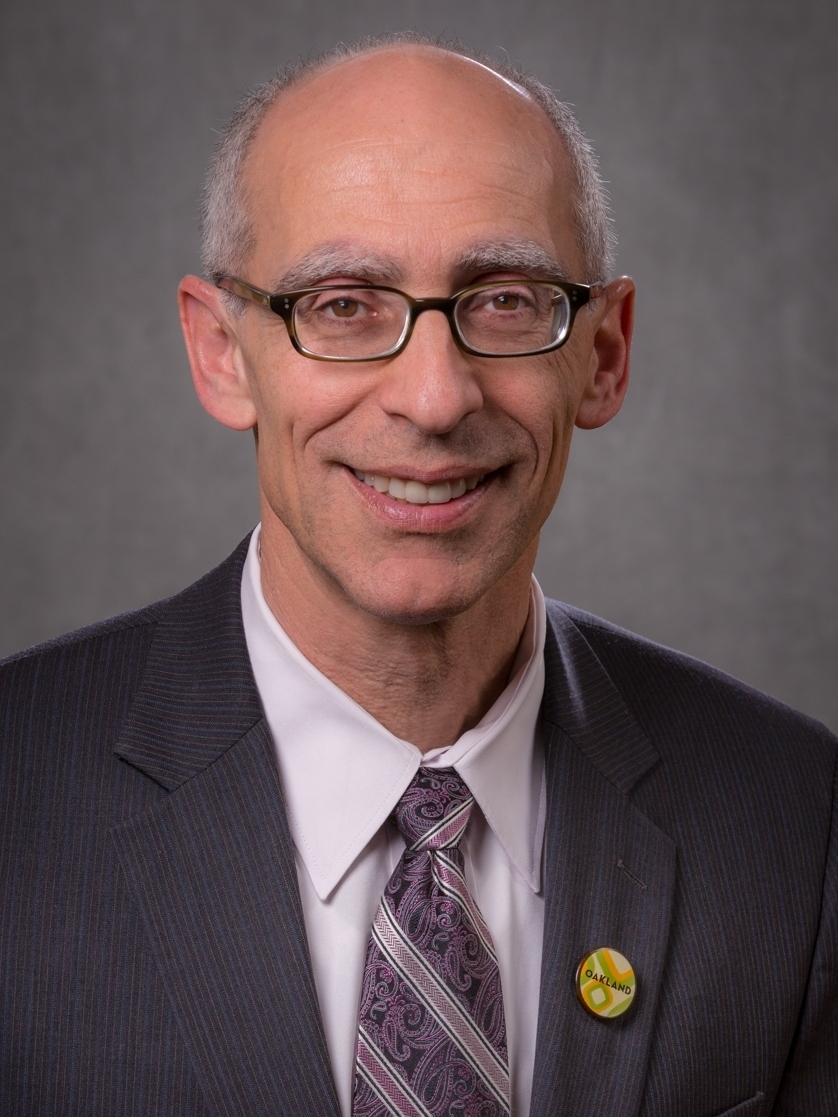

Member of the Oakland City Council from District 1
- In office January 7, 2013 – January 6, 2025
- Preceded by: Jane Brunner
- Succeeded by: Zac Unger

Oakland City Council President Pro Tem
- In office 2022 – January 6, 2025
- Preceded by: Sheng Thao
- In office 2018–2021
- Preceded by: Larry Reid
- Succeeded by: Sheng Thao

Personal details
- Born: Daniel E. Kalb; August 14, 1959 (age 67)
- Party: Democratic
- Spouse: Valarie Mark
- Website: www.dankalb.net

Dan Kalb is an American politician who represented District 1 on the Oakland City Council from January 7, 2013 to January 6, 2025.

== Education ==
In 1982, Kalb received an undergraduate degree from the University of California at Berkeley in Conservation of Natural Resources—the same undergraduate major from which State Senate Nancy Skinner graduated. In 1988 he received a master's degree in Public and Nonprofit Administration from the University of San Francisco.

== Career ==
Kalb was California Policy Director at the Union of Concerned Scientists, which he joined in 2003. where he worked for nine years on renewable energy, climate, clean transportation and air quality legislation. Before joining UCS, he worked as Director of a Sierra Club chapter and for California Common Cause, Media Alliance and CalPIRG.

After being elected to the Oakland City Council in Nov. 2012, he worked extensively on affordable housing, environmental, police oversight and good government legislation. in 2014 Kalb led a charter proposal to substantially strengthen the Oakland Public Ethics Commission (PEC). The Charter measure was voted on in the general election of November 2014. It passed with over 72% of the vote. He also was the lead author of a 2016 ballot measure to create a civilian police commission in Oakland.

In 2018, he ran for California's 15th State Assembly district but lost to Richmond City Councilwoman Jovanka Beckles by 0.6% for the second slot to run in the runoff against Buffy Wicks.

In 2024, he ran for California's 7th State Senate district, but lost again to Jovanka Beckles for the second slot to run in the runoff against Jesse Arreguin.

== Recognition & Awards ==
• Best Good Government Politician, 2014, East Bay Express

• Outstanding Elected Official of the Year, 2015, CA Public Library Advocates

• Most Effective Member of the (City) Council, 2016, Oakland Magazine

• Affordable Housing Champion, 2020, East Bay Housing Organizations (EBHO)
