= 2014 Richmond, California municipal elections =

The Richmond, California 2014 city election decided the mayor, three council members, and one measure submitted to the voters of Richmond, California on November 4, 2014. The election attracted national attention due to the amount of money spent by Chevron both for and against various candidates. Chevron created two political action committees (both named Moving Forward) and contributed $2,933,363.90 to them amounting to a total of about $30 per city resident. The only other source of money for them was $5000 each from the Richmond Police Officers Association and the local Firefighter's union. As of October 10, they spent $1.4 Million supporting Nat Bates for mayor and Donna Powers, Charles Ramsey and Al Martinez for the city council. They spent a further $500,000 on negative campaigning against council candidates Gayle McLaughlin, Jovanka Beckles and Eduardo Martinez. The other major candidate for mayor, Tom Butt, had a campaign budget of just over $22,000.

In the general election, all of the candidates Chevron supported were defeated.

== Mayoral race ==
Richmond, California mayoral election, 2014
- November 4, 2014
