= 2006 Richmond, California municipal elections =

2006 Richmond mayoral election
- November 7, 2007
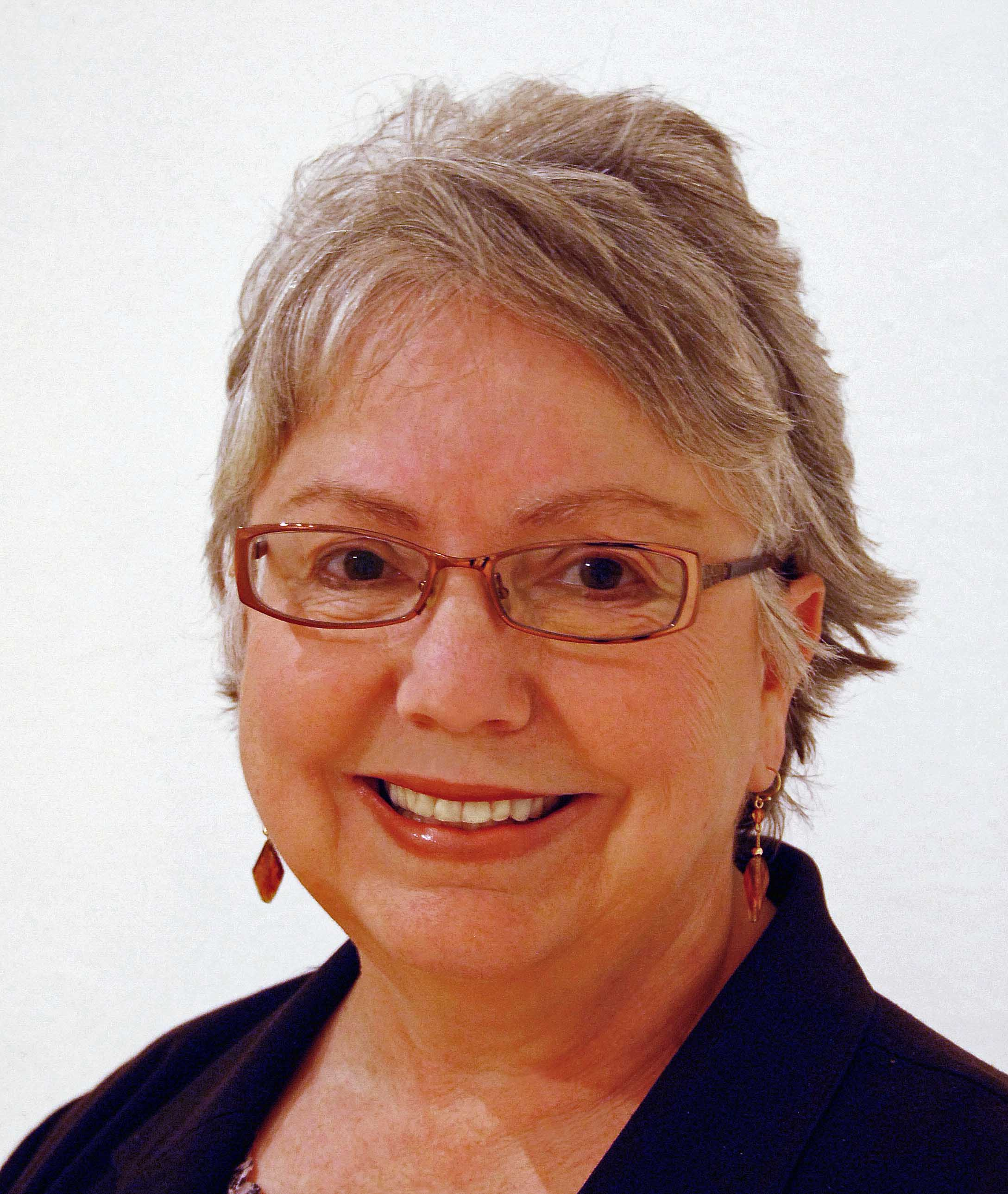

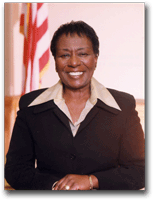

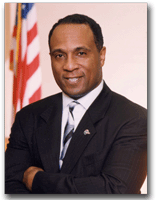
Candidate	Gayle McLaughlin	Irma A. Anderson	Gary Bell
Party	Green	Democratic	Democratic
Popular vote	7,343	7,101	5,019
Percentage	37.2%	36.1%	26.1 %
Mayor before election
Irma A. Anderson
Democratic
Elected mayor
Gayle McLaughlin
Green

The Richmond, California 2006 city election decided the mayor, four council members, and one measure submitted to the voters of Richmond, California on November 7, 2007. The election also elected the first Green Party mayor of this city, and made Richmond the largest city in the United States to have a Green mayor. Furthermore, it unseated an incumbent mayor from a major political party by one from a minor third party.

== Mayoral race ==
The mayor's race was a three-way contest between incumbent mayor Irma A. Anderson, former council member Gary Bell (both Democrats), and council member Gayle McLaughlin, a Green. In 2004, McLaughlin had become the first member of the Green Party to win a seat on the Richmond city council. This is attributed to her door-to-door campaigning and the fact that ballots for Richmond city offices do not mention political party. McLaughlin won with 37.2 percent of the votes, followed by Anderson with 36.1 and Gary Bell 26.1. becoming the first Green mayor of a major California city (a feat nearly achieved by Matt González in the 2003 San Francisco mayoral election). Those who decided to vote by mail had to pay an additional US$.63 instead of having it mailed for free as is the custom.

=== Gayle McLaughlin ===
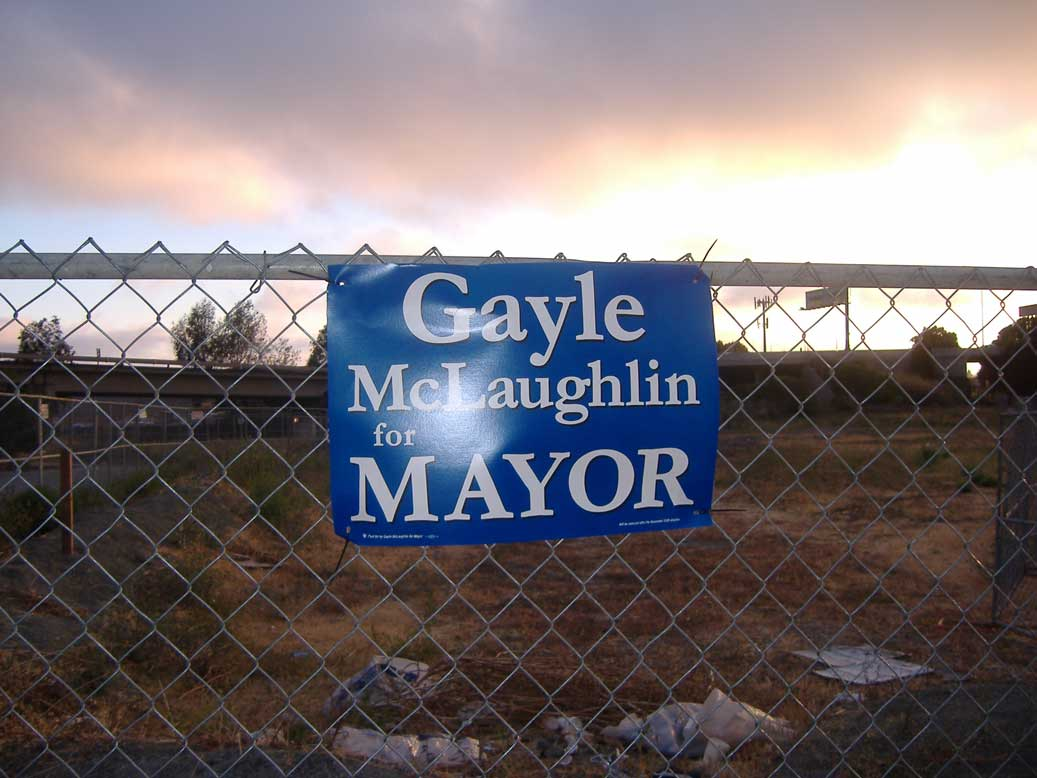

McLaughlin was endorsed by councils and local chapters of several labor unions including: the AFSCME, International Union, and SEIU. Organizations such as the Sierra Club, local Green Parties, Richmond Greens, Alameda County Greens, Contra Costa County Greens, and political groups such as the Mexican American Political Association (MAPA), the Richmond Progressive Alliance were among McLaughlin's supporters.

=== Irma Anderson ===
Irma Anderson, the prior mayor of Richmond, was endorsed by Dianne Feinstein, Phil Angelides, Loni Hancock, and John Gioia.

=== Gary Bell ===
Gary Bell, a banker, had been a council member from 2000 to 2005. He said it was important that residents "feel that their opinion or point of view is heard". His campaign slogan was "No more politics".

== City council race ==
2006's election was considered important because it was the last election for a nine-member council. As of the 2007 election, the number of council members decreased to five.

The results for the four-year seats were as follows:

Jim Rogers 9,295 María T. Viramontes 9,033 Ludmyrna "Myrna" López 7,864 (these three were elected)

Courtland "Corky" Boozé 7,382 James "Jim" Jenkins 4,825 Richard Griffin 4,678

=== Tony Thurmond ===
Tony Thurmond was unopposed in running for a short (2-year) term for a vacancy created by a resignation.

== Measures ==
There was only one measure on the ballot that year. In the past several elections, the city's voters had been reluctant to pass any measures at the city level.

=== Measure T ===
Measure T was designed to raise funds for city services in Richmond, California. The measure's purpose was to raise $10 million in additional annual revenue for the purpose of hiring fifty additional police officers, expanding community programs and youth crime prevention, and to serve as a general city tax code overhaul. It proposed adding a 1/8% manufacturing tax on raw materials used in manufacturing. More controversially, the taxation of rental units would change from a flat $247 annual fee to a fee of $35–$90 per residential unit and a 3 cents per square foot tax on non-residential units. Measure T would have also increased the business tax by 10% and made small adjustments to other business taxes, such as those for arcade games. It was supported by the Richmond Police Department including Chief Rupf and several neighborhood councils. Chevron, which has a large Chevron Richmond Refinery, opposed the measure. Under the Measure T provisions, Chevron would pay eight of the desired ten million dollars. A few local taxpayer organizations also opposed the measure. It was defeated by a ratio of approximately two to one.
