= Gayle McLaughlin =

American politician (born 1952)

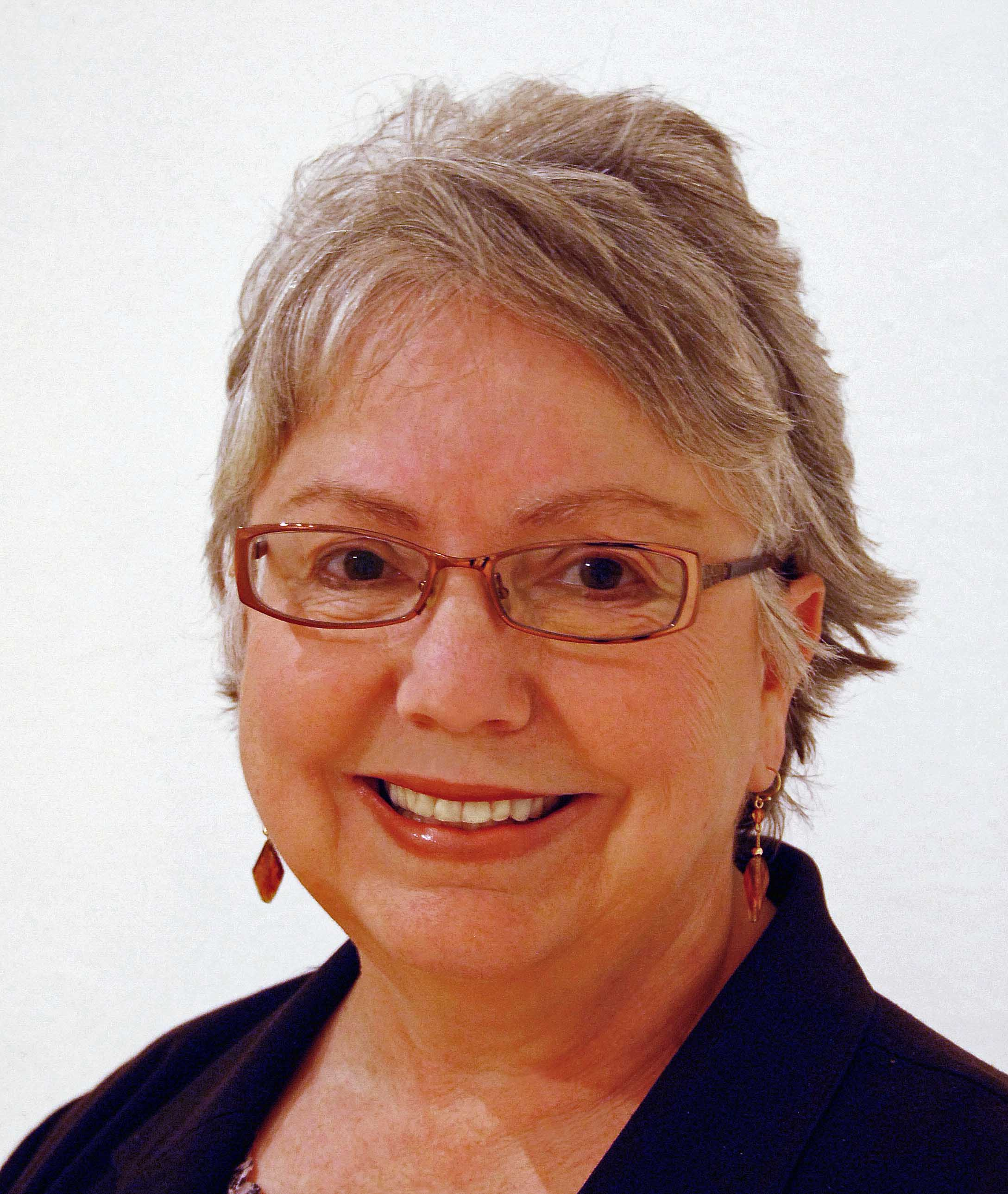
- McLaughlin in 2010

5th Mayor of Richmond, California
- In office January 9, 2007 – January 13, 2015
- Preceded by: Irma A. Anderson
- Succeeded by: Tom Butt

Member of the Richmond City Council
- In office January 13, 2015 – July 18, 2017
- In office January 2005 – January 9, 2007

Personal details
- Born: 1952 (age 73–74) Chicago, Illinois, U.S.
- Party: Independent
- Other political affiliations: Richmond Progressive Alliance, Green Party (until 2016)
- Education: Bridgewater State University (BS)
- Profession: Educator and activist

Gayle McLaughlin (born 1952) is an American politician from Richmond, California. She was first elected to the Richmond City Council in 2004 when she was a member of the Green Party of California. She won two consecutive four-year terms as the city's mayor in 2006 and 2010. After reaching the mayoral term limit, she was reelected to the City Council in 2014. In June 2017, she announced her candidacy for lieutenant governor of California in the 2018 election.

McLaughlin's election in 2006 made Richmond the largest U.S. city led by a Green Party member. She has advocated for a minimum wage increase and a plan to forcibly appropriate foreclosed home mortgages from banks. She has led an ongoing effort to restrict the municipal influence of Richmond's largest employer, the Chevron Corporation, and to refashion its environmental obligations.

== Early life and education ==
McLaughlin was born into a working class family in Chicago. The middle child of five daughters, her father was a union carpenter and her mother was a factory worker and housewife.

During the 1980s, McLaughlin was an activist with the Central American solidarity movement and a steering committee member of CISPES (Committee In Solidarity with the People of El Salvador). She also played a role in the North Star Network, a national networking effort to unite progressives, and in coalition-building efforts with Rainbow/PUSH.

McLaughlin earned a Bachelor of Science degree in psychology from Bridgewater State University and took graduate courses in psychology and education at Rhode Island College and UC Berkeley Extension.

== Career ==
She has worked as a postal clerk, teacher, caregiver for the elderly, and tutor/clinician for children with learning disabilities. She has also worked in the capacity of support staff for various not-for-profit health and educational organizations. She has lived in Richmond since 2001.

=== Richmond Progressive Alliance ===
McLaughlin is a founder of the Richmond Progressive Alliance (RPA), a non-partisan progressive group in western Contra Costa County, composed of members of the Green Party, Democratic Party, and the Peace and Freedom Party, as well as independent voters. In 2004, the RPA ran a slate of candidates to replace a municipal government that was widely seen as dysfunctional: "There are vacancies in virtually every major administrative department," wrote the San Francisco Chronicle, "and the city is operating with an interim city manager, city attorney, police chief and fire chief. The city has no library director and no parks and recreation director, and no one running its housing authority." Together with RPA colleagues, McLaughlin won her first election to the Richmond City Council in November 2004.

In Richmond, McLaughlin was involved in local effortsin support of social and environmental justice. She opposed the Patriot Act, the criminalization of the homeless, and Chevron's Richmond Refinery tax perks. She has also been involved in an ongoing effort to stop development on the North Richmond shoreline and supports the Service Employees International Union.

=== Mayor of Richmond ===
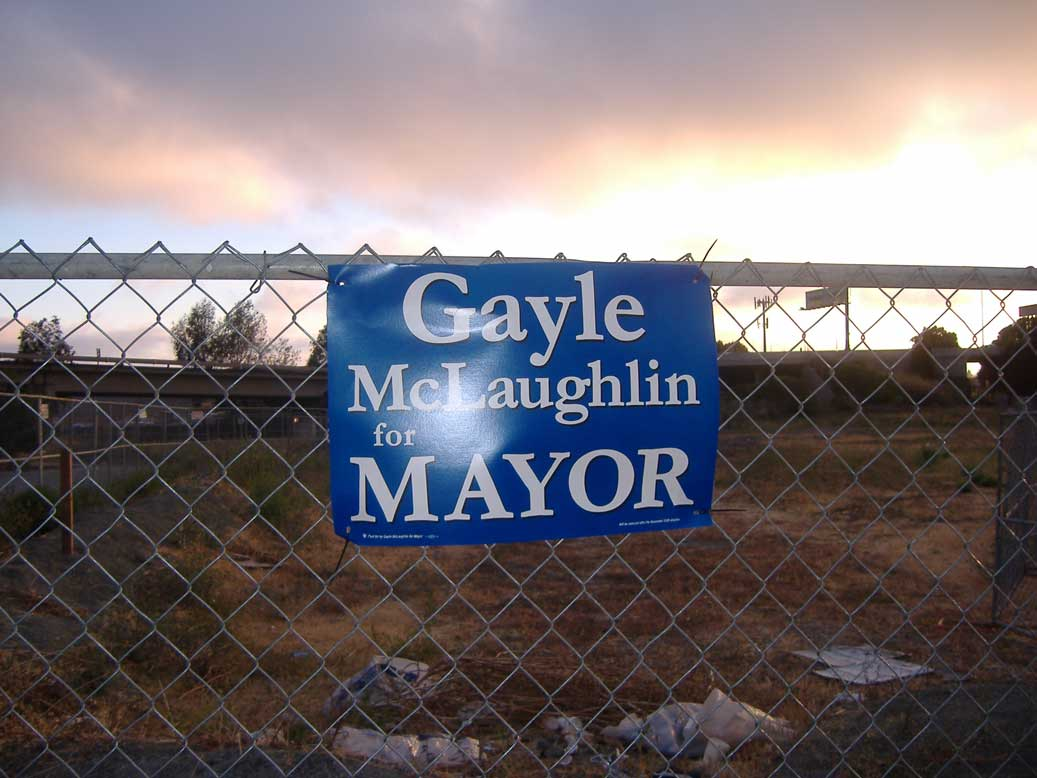
Campaign sign, 2006

In 2006, McLaughlin decided to challenge Richmond's incumbent mayor Irma Anderson. She was elected on November 7, 2006 by a 242-vote margin over Anderson. At the time, her victory made Richmond the largest city in the country with a Green Party mayor. McLaughlin won a second term in office in the 2010 municipal election.

Under McLaughlin's mayoralty, the "small, blue-collar city best known for its Chevron refinery has become the unlikely vanguard for anticorporate, left-wing activism". From early in her career, McLaughlin supported workers' cooperatives as a means of fighting unemployment. She was a strong proponent of Measure N, a proposed municipal soda tax that was met by determined, well-funded resistance from the American Beverage Association and other business interests. She also spearheaded a 2014 effort to raise Richmond's local minimum wage to US$12.30 per hour. The raise provided impetus to the broader statewide minimum wage movement. McLaughlin was a member of the nationwide advocacy group Mayors Against Illegal Guns Coalition.

McLaughlin was criticized for attending an Occupy rally on Veterans Day of 2011 instead of a symbolic ship-launching portrayal at the former Richmond Shipyards. McLaughlin stated she was a supporter of Veterans for Peace and Iraq Veterans Against the War.

==== Eminent domain against banks ====
The U.S. mortgage crisis of the late 2000s had a powerful impact on Richmond. Even by 2013, nearly half of all home mortgages in the city were "underwater", with owners owing more than their houses were worth. On average, homeowners with mortgages were indebted for about 45% more than the original value of their homes. McLaughlin mounted an effort to gain control of the mortgages. The city, in partnership with a private financing company, would seek to purchase mortgages from banks at fair market value and then allow the homeowners to refinance for a minimal fee. If the banks refused, the city would seize the mortgages using the legal power of eminent domain.

Defending the plan, McLaughlin said mortgage seizures were necessary to alleviate "an unjust set of circumstances" facing homeowners after the Great Recession, and the use of eminent domain would be justified for the common good by preventing urban blight caused by abandoned foreclosed homes. The city thus has a right and duty to prevent foreclosures, as well as a legal necessity to protect its citizens: "People were tricked. They were sold these bad loans" which were far in excess of their value, and made Richmond "a community being victimized". In March 2013, the City Council voted 6–1 in favor of partnering with a San Francisco firm, Mortgage Resolution Partners (MRP), to begin enactment of the plan.

Opponents in Richmond countered that the plan would help only a small subsection of mortgage-holders, while two banks, Wells Fargo and Deutsche Bank, immediately filed lawsuits against the city. Arguing that it was an illegal use of eminent domain, the banks also warned that it would severely damage the U.S. mortgage industry by encouraging other municipalities to do the same. Other cities, including Newark, North Las Vegas, and Seattle were all said to be considering mortgage seizure, although only Richmond publicly pursued the plan. Undaunted, McLaughlin told the press in August 2013 that her administration was confident that it would prevail in court against the banks. The following month, after heated public debate, the City Council again voted to back McLaughlin and proceed with the plan.

==== Chevron ====
McLaughlin had a contentious relationship with the Chevron Corporation during her political career. The multinational energy corporation maintains a refinery in Richmond, and it has long dominated the city's economy and politics. After the RPA took root, however, the shift in government caused friction with Chevron, particularly after the McLaughlin administration fought it in court over the payment of various taxes. A major fire at the refinery in August 2012 led to another lawsuit, this time for "willful and conscious disregard of public safety".

=== Return to City Council ===
After her mayoralty ended, Chevron continued to oppose her vigorously, "spending some $3 million – an unheard of amount for a small, local election – to campaign against McLaughlin and her slate" in the 2014 city council elections. She was nonetheless elected to the City Council in 2014 and served in this role until July 18, 2017, when she resigned to seek a higher political office.

McLaughlin was criticized East Bay Times, which referred to her and the RPA in a 2016 editorial as "the biggest deniers of the city's fiscal crisis."

She and her fellow RPA candidates Eduardo Martinez and Jovanka Beckles all won by wide margins in 2014 despite having been heavily outspent by their opposition. The 2016 City Council elections were noticeably quieter in tone, with no financial input from Chevron, according to campaign finance reports. Two other RPA candidates, Melvin Willis and Ben Choi, won open seats creating a RPA majority in the City Council.

In 2016, McLaughlin changed her political party registration from Green Party to NPP ("No Party Preference") so she could vote for U.S. Senator Bernie Sanders in the California presidential primary.

=== Campaign for lieutenant governor ===
In June 2017, McLaughlin declared her candidacy for lieutenant governor in the California lieutenant gubernatorial election of 2018. Her independent campaign refused to accept any corporate contributions.

Although McLaughlin ran with no party affiliation, her endorsements include the California National Party, the Peninsula chapter of the Democratic Socialists of America, the Green Party of California, Our Revolution, the Peace and Freedom Party, the People's Party, and the Richmond Progressive Alliance.

The hotly contested primary race saw over $10 million raised by campaigns, "far more than the $7.6 million that candidates raised for the entire election cycle the last time the seat was open in 2010". In a crowded field of eight, McLaughlin won 263,364 votes (4.0%).

=== Books ===
A chronicle of the McLaughlin administration's rise and legacy, Refinery Town: Big Oil, Big Money, and the Remaking of an American City, was published in 2017 with a foreword written by Bernie Sanders. This was followed in early 2018 by McLaughlin's own memoir, Winning Richmond: How a Progressive Alliance Won City Hall.

== See also ==
- 2006 Richmond, California city election
- 2014 Richmond, California city election
- List of Democratic Socialists of America who have held office in the United States
