= Jovanka Beckles =

American politician (born 1963)

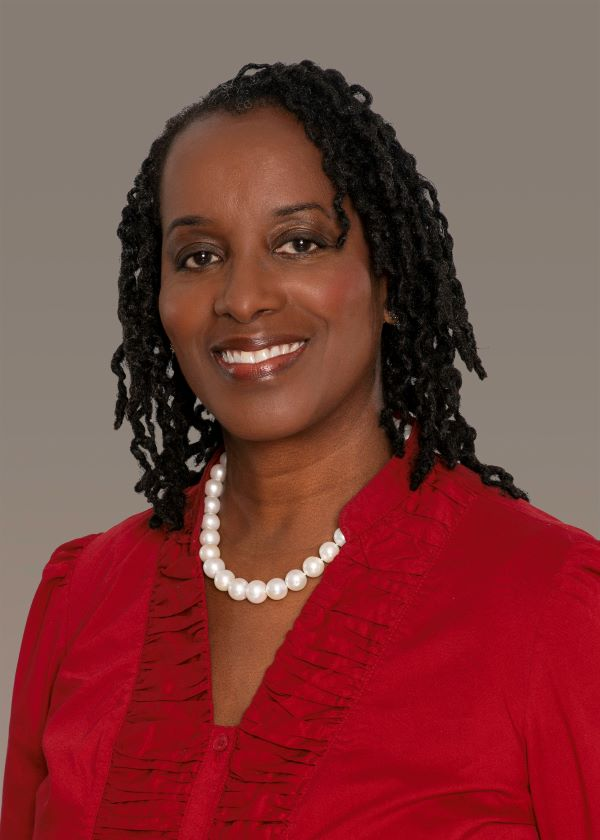

Member of the AC Transit Board of Directors from Ward 1
- In office December 4, 2020 – December 6, 2024
- Preceded by: Joe Wallace
- Succeeded by: H.E. Christian Peeples

Member of the Richmond City Council
- In office 2010–2018

Personal details
- Born: 1963 Panama City, Panama
- Party: Democratic (until 2024); Independent (since 2024)
- Other political affiliations: Democratic Socialists of America. Richmond Progressive Alliance
- Spouse: Nicole Valentino (m. 2013)
- Education: Florida A&M University (BA); University of Phoenix (MBA)

Jovanka Beckles (born 1963) is an American politician. She served as a member of the Alameda-Contra Costa Transit Board for Ward 1, and previously served as a member of the Richmond City Council. In 2018 and 2024, she lost high-profile runoff elections for California state legislative office.

== Early life, education, and career ==
Beckles was born in Panama City, Panama and immigrated to the United States with her family in 1972. She attended Florida A&M University on a full basketball scholarship, and graduated cum laude in 1988 with a BA degree in Psychology. She later earned an MBA degree from the University of Phoenix. She moved to the Bay Area in 1989 and worked as a counselor, youth educator, housing case manager for the homeless, and mental health specialist.

== Political career ==
=== Richmond City Council ===
In 2008, she first ran for the Richmond City Council as part of the Richmond Progressive Alliance and lost. She ran again in 2010 and won, and in 2014 she was reelected despite Chevron spending $3 million on opposing candidates, and became vice mayor. She was Richmond's first openly lesbian councilwoman.

During her time on the City Council, Beckles worked on implementing rent control in Richmond. She voted against or abstained on several proposals to build housing in Richmond.

=== Campaign for California State Assembly ===
In 2018, she ran for California State Assembly in the 15th District to replace Tony Thurmond, who chose to run for California State Superintendent of Public Instruction. She was endorsed by fellow Richmond City Councilmember (and former mayor) Gayle McLaughlin, former Black Panther Ericka Huggins, Senator Bernie Sanders, the Sierra Club, SEIU 1021, Our Revolution, and the Democratic Socialists of America. She took second place in the June 12 primary, but lost to Buffy Wicks in the general election.

During the campaign, Beckles said she wanted to retain local control over housing, "I really think that cities need to be able to have more control in terms of building, because they know best." On housing, she argued that cities like San Francisco, Oakland and Berkeley are "building lots of new housing" but that the problem is that the housing is not affordable. She added, "I don't think that we have a housing crisis. I think that we have an affordable housing crisis." She called for a repeal of the Costa-Hawkins Rental Housing Act, which would enable cities in California to expand rent control.

=== AC Transit Board ===
On July 18, 2020, Beckles announced she would run for AC Transit Board in Ward 1 against 20-year incumbent Joe Wallace. Her platform included keeping transit fare-free and strengthening labor rights for transit workers. She won the general election with 50% of the vote, defeating Wallace and a third candidate, Ben Fong. She was sworn in on December 4, 2020. Her term ended with her successor, H.E. Christian Peeples, sworn in on December 6, 2024.

=== Campaign for California State Senate ===
In 2023, Beckles announced she would run for California State Senate in the 7th District to replace Nancy Skinner, who is term-limited. Foregoing re-election to the AC Transit Board, Beckles participated in the top-two general election, losing to then-Berkeley Mayor Jesse Arreguín in November 2024.

== Political positions ==
Beckles is currently associated with Democratic Socialists of America.

=== Healthcare ===
Beckles supported Medicare for All, establishing single-payer healthcare system. Beckles posted a statement on Instagram, citing that "Our current healthcare system has placed corporate profit over people, both patients and workers, time and time again.

Honored to receive the endorsement of National Union of Healthcare Workers and join them in the fight for higher wages, safer staffing levels, and single-payer healthcare! #TogetherWeWin" from her Instagram page after National Union of Healthcare Workers.

=== Minimum wage ===
Beckles supported increasing minimum wage to $15.

=== Green New Deal ===
When asked about the Green New Deal, she agreed that the Green New Deal would bring more representation and can help improve the transportation and housing.

=== Corporate money ===
She opposes taking money donations from corporates. She claimed that lawmakers that promised to address climate change, and building more affordable housing and infrastructure were all denied or forged with progressives and those who are New Democrats.

=== Housing ===
Beckles supported housing as a human right. She worked with Berkeley council people on capping rent. She supports rent control and wants to push for affordable housing on public property paid with public funds rather than increase the supply of market-rate housing being built.

== Controversies ==
Beckles, and 4 other council members at the time, came under fire for passing a resolution on space based weaponry targeting Richmond residents, introducing it as “in solidarity with Richmond residents who claim to be under assault by space-based weapons”. This led to in an influx of calls to the police from people feeling personally targeted by satellite weapons.

== Personal life ==
Beckles is openly lesbian. She married Nicole Valentino in 2013.
