= Buffy Wicks =

American politician (born 1977)

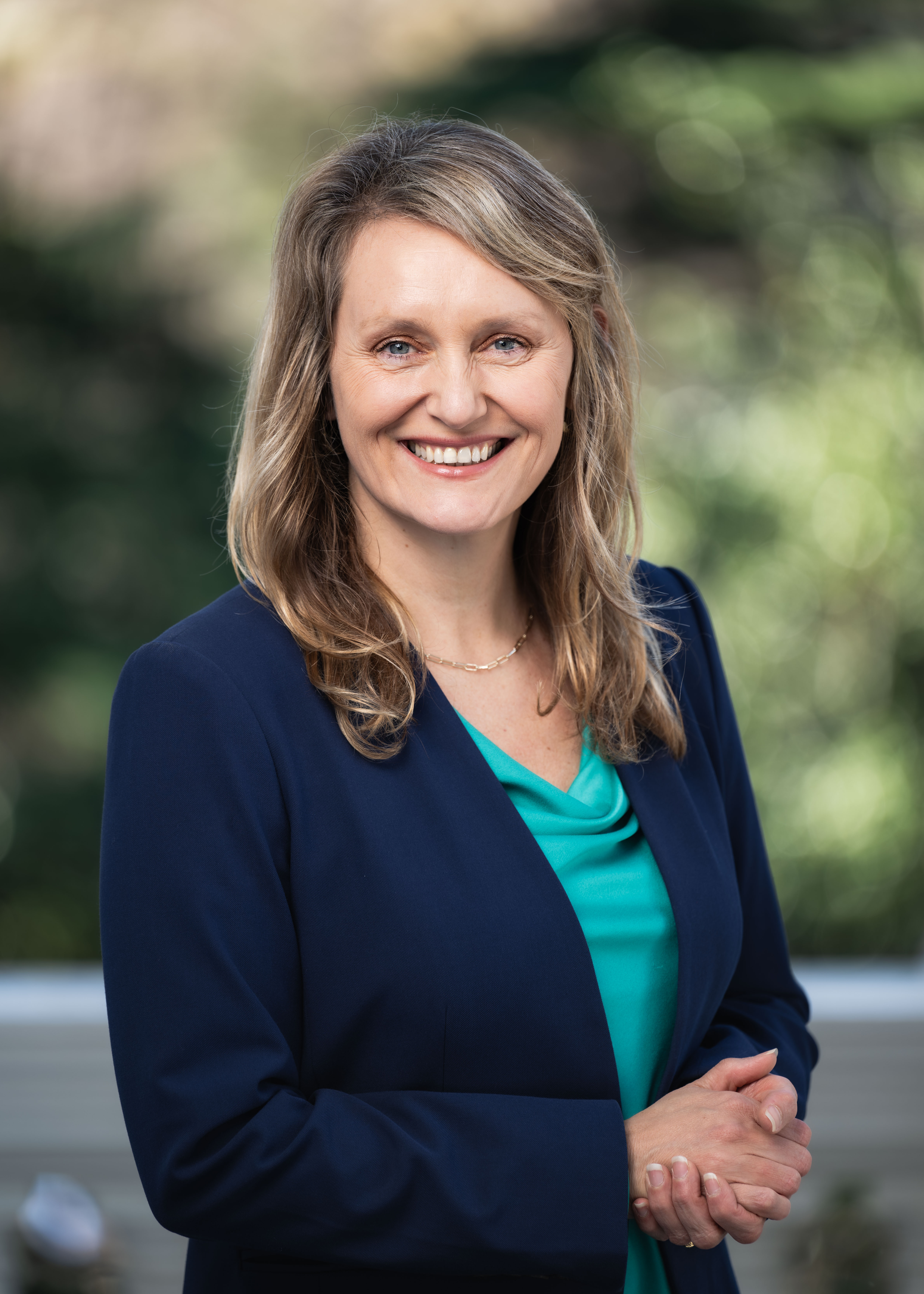
- Official portrait, 2024

Member of the California State Assembly
- Incumbent
- Assumed office December 3, 2018
- Preceded by: Tony Thurmond
- Constituency: 15th district (2018–2022); 14th district (2022–present)

Personal details
- Born: Buffy Jo Christina Wicks; August 10, 1977 (age 49) Foresthill, California, U.S.
- Party: Democratic
- Spouse: Peter Ambler
- Children: 2
- Education: Jaume I University; University of Washington (BA)
- Website: State Assembly website

Buffy Jo Christina Wicks (born August 10, 1977) is an American politician serving in the California State Assembly. A member of the Democratic party, she represents the 14th Assembly District, which includes the cities of Berkeley, Piedmont, Richmond, San Pablo, and El Cerrito in the East Bay.

Before her election to the state assembly, she was an American political strategist who is credited as one of the architects of President Barack Obama's grassroots organizing model. She also served on the senior staff of Obama's 2008 and 2012 presidential campaigns, and as deputy director at the White House Office of Public Engagement.

Wicks was first elected to the state assembly in 2018 after defeating Richmond City Council member Jovanka Beckles, a fellow Democrat. During her tenure, Wicks has led legislative efforts aimed at increasing housing supply in California, and has been described as one of the legislature's leading pro-housing lawmakers.

== Background ==
Born in Foresthill, California in 1977, Wicks graduated from Placer High School in 1995. She graduated from the University of Washington in 1999 with a B.A. degree in political science and history.

In 2000, she began a two-year program for an International Master in Peace, Conflict, and Development Studies (PEACE Master) of the Universitat Jaume I (UJI), Castellón, Spain, under the UNESCO Chair of Philosophy for Peace, but left in 2001 and did not complete the degree.

== Political career ==
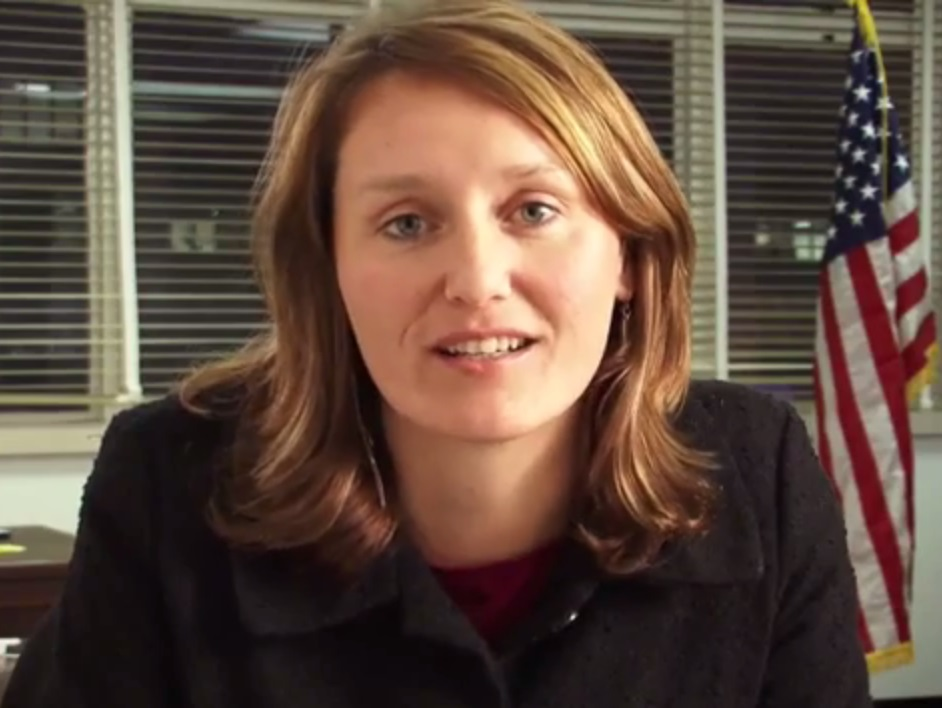
Wicks in 2008 while part of the Presidential Inaugural Committee for Barack Obama.

Wicks has worked in the labor movement, on women's issues, and as a children's rights advocate.

Wicks's started her political career in the early 2000s in the San Francisco Bay Area by organizing rallies against the Iraq War. She then worked on the unsuccessful 2004 presidential campaign of Howard Dean.

As one of the early hires on the 2008 presidential campaign for Barack Obama, Wicks was active in grassroots mobilization and outcome-based organizing. She ran various state operations during the primaries and general election, including in California, Texas and Missouri.

Wicks was then tapped by President Obama to serve in the Executive Office of the President as the deputy director of the White House Office of Public Engagement.

From 2010 to 2011, Wicks "served as Rahm Emanuel's campaign manager in early months of campaign and developed core strategy and positioning in race as well as early infrastructure."

In 2012, she joined President Obama's re-election effort and served as the National Director of Operation Vote. She was responsible for mobilizing voters in demographic groups including African American, Latino, women, and the youth.

From 2014 to 2015, Wicks transitioned the super PAC Priorities USA Action into a pro-Hillary Clinton vehicle and served as its executive director. In 2016, Wicks was named the California State director by Clinton's presidential campaign in advance of the June 7 primary.

Wicks previously worked as the political director of "Wake Up Wal-Mart", a United Food and Commercial Worker-funded movement. She was a fellow at Institute of Politics and Public Policy at Georgetown University and a senior fellow at the Center for American Progress focusing on public policies affecting women and families.

Wicks has published opinion editorials for Time, Politico, and the Daily Beast on current political events. She also gives regular speeches in the United States and abroad on organizing, leadership, women's issues, and the state of American politics.

=== California State Assembly ===
==== First election ====
In 2017, Wicks declared herself a candidate for the 2018 California State Assembly election, running for the 15th district. The seat was vacated by Tony Thurmond, who ran for California State Superintendent of Public Instruction. Wicks's opponents in the race included Oakland City Councilman Dan Kalb and Richmond City Councilwoman Jovanka Beckles. In the primary held on June 5, Wicks finished first with 31.4% of the vote. In the general election on November 6, Wicks won with 54% of the vote to Beckles's 46%.

==== First State Assembly term ====
On August 31, 2020 (the final day of the legislative session), Wicks, having been previously denied the right to vote by proxy, appeared on the floor of the State Assembly holding her crying newborn baby while speaking in favor of passing housing legislation. This incident earned Wicks international attention, sparking a discussion in the media on how she might use her newfound reputation to advocate for expanding family leave protections in the United States. Meena Harris, Hillary Clinton, and others took to social media to congratulate and encourage Wicks.

Wicks co-sponsored the More HOMES Act (SB 50), which would have streamlined approval of multi-family housing near transit stops, but the bill was defeated in a Senate floor vote. A pared-down version of the bill, SB 920, was passed in the Senate but died in Assembly committee.

==== Second State Assembly term ====
In her second term, Wicks served as Chair of the Assembly Committee on Housing and Community Development. On April 22, 2022, a convoy of anti-abortion truckers attempted to demonstrate in front of her house, but were driven away by egg-wielding children. Wicks was the author for several pieces of housing legislation including AB 2011.

Wicks sponsored a bill that would require all workers in California to be vaccinated with the COVID-19 vaccines. The Bill was "postponed" after the bill faced stiff opposition from labor unions as the Omicron variant crested in the heavily vaccinated state.

===== Reproductive rights =====
Anti-abortion commentators generated controversy when Wicks introduced AB 2223, a bill intended to protect women from criminal prosecutions for experiencing a miscarriage or inducing an abortion. Under the current law at the time, stillbirths after 20 weeks are considered "unattended deaths" and a coroner is required to investigate. AB 2223 would have reclassified stillbirths such that they are no longer investigated as a matter of course, although it does not explicitly prevent stillbirths from being investigated. While the bill still allows authorities "to be able to investigate the facts of a newborn child's death, including whether the child was born living and when and how the child died," it was widely and controversially characterized by anti-abortion commentators as legalizing infanticide.

The text of AB 2223 read: "Notwithstanding any other law, a person shall not be subject to civil or criminal liability or penalty, or otherwise deprived of their rights under this article, based on their actions or omissions with respect to their pregnancy or actual, potential, or alleged pregnancy outcome, including miscarriage, stillbirth, or abortion, or perinatal death due to causes that occurred in utero."

According to the medical dictionary, perinatal refers to the period from 22nd week of gestation through the first 28 days after delivery.

==== Fourth State Assembly term ====
In 2025, Wicks sponsored legislation to exempt most urban housing developments from the California Environmental Quality Act (CEQA). By creating onerous processes, including empowering NIMBYs, CEQA has been characterized as a major hindrance to housing construction in California. Wicks co-sponsored the Abundant and Affordable Homes Near Transit Act (SB 79), a pared-down version of the previous More HOMES Act, which was passed by both houses and signed into law on October 10, 2025, coming into force on July 1, 2026.

In 2025, Governor Gavin Newsom signed into law Wick's Assembly Bill 1043, a controversial operating system age verification law. Assembly Bill 1043, or the Digital Age Assurance Act, is a California law that forces operating system makers and app stores to collect a user's age or date of birth at device setup and then package that info into an age signal that apps can read every time you launch them. Open platforms like Linux, which pride themselves on privacy and decentralization, have no centralized account system specifically for collecting or sending the user's age information. Several distributions have chosen to not allow California residents to run their operating system. As a result of this, in early 2026, MidnightBSD announced it would exclude California residents from using its desktop version starting January 1, 2027, as a risk mitigation step regarding new state legislation.

== Electoral history ==
2018 California State Assembly 15th district election
Primary election
Party	Candidate	Votes	%
Democratic	Buffy Wicks	37,141	31.4
Democratic	Jovanka Beckles	18,733	15.8
Democratic	Dan Kalb	18,007	15.2
Democratic	Judy Appel	13,591	11.5
Democratic	Rochelle Pardue-Okimoto	9,826	8.3
Republican	Pranav Jandhyala	6,946	5.9
Democratic	Andy Katz	6,209	5.2
Democratic	Ben Bartlett	3,949	3.3
Democratic	Cheryl Sudduth	1,493	1.2
Democratic	Raquella Thaman	1,007	0.9
Democratic	Owen Poindexter	819	0.7
Democratic	Sergey Vikramsingh Piterman	689	0.6
Total votes		118,410	100.0
General election
Democratic	Buffy Wicks	104,583	53.6
Democratic	Jovanka Beckles	90,406	46.4
Total votes		194,989	100.0
Democratic hold			

2020 California State Assembly 15th district election
Primary election
Party	Candidate	Votes	%
Democratic	Buffy Wicks (incumbent)	135,623	83.6
No party preference	Sara Brink	13,841	8.5
Republican	Jeanne M. Solnordal	12,791	7.9
Total votes		162,255	100.0
General election
Democratic	Buffy Wicks (incumbent)	204,108	84.7
No party preference	Sara Brink	36,732	15.3
Total votes		240,840	100.0
Democratic hold			

2022 California State Assembly 14th district election
Primary election
Party	Candidate	Votes	%
Democratic	Buffy Wicks (incumbent)	85,180	100.0
Republican	Richard Kinney (write-in)	37	0.0
Total votes		84,619	100.0
General election
Democratic	Buffy Wicks (incumbent)	139,331	88.4
Republican	Richard Kinney	18,242	11.6
Total votes		157,573	100.0
Democratic hold			

2024 California State Assembly 14th district election
Primary election
Party	Candidate	Votes	%
Democratic	Buffy Wicks (incumbent)	78,750	73.5
Democratic	Margot Smith	18,272	17.1
Republican	Utkarsh Jain	10,075	9.4
Total votes		107,097	100.0
General election
Democratic	Buffy Wicks (incumbent)	124,973	68.5
Democratic	Margot Smith	57,450	31.5
Total votes		182,423	100.0
Democratic hold			
