= Eduardo Martinez (politician) =

American politician

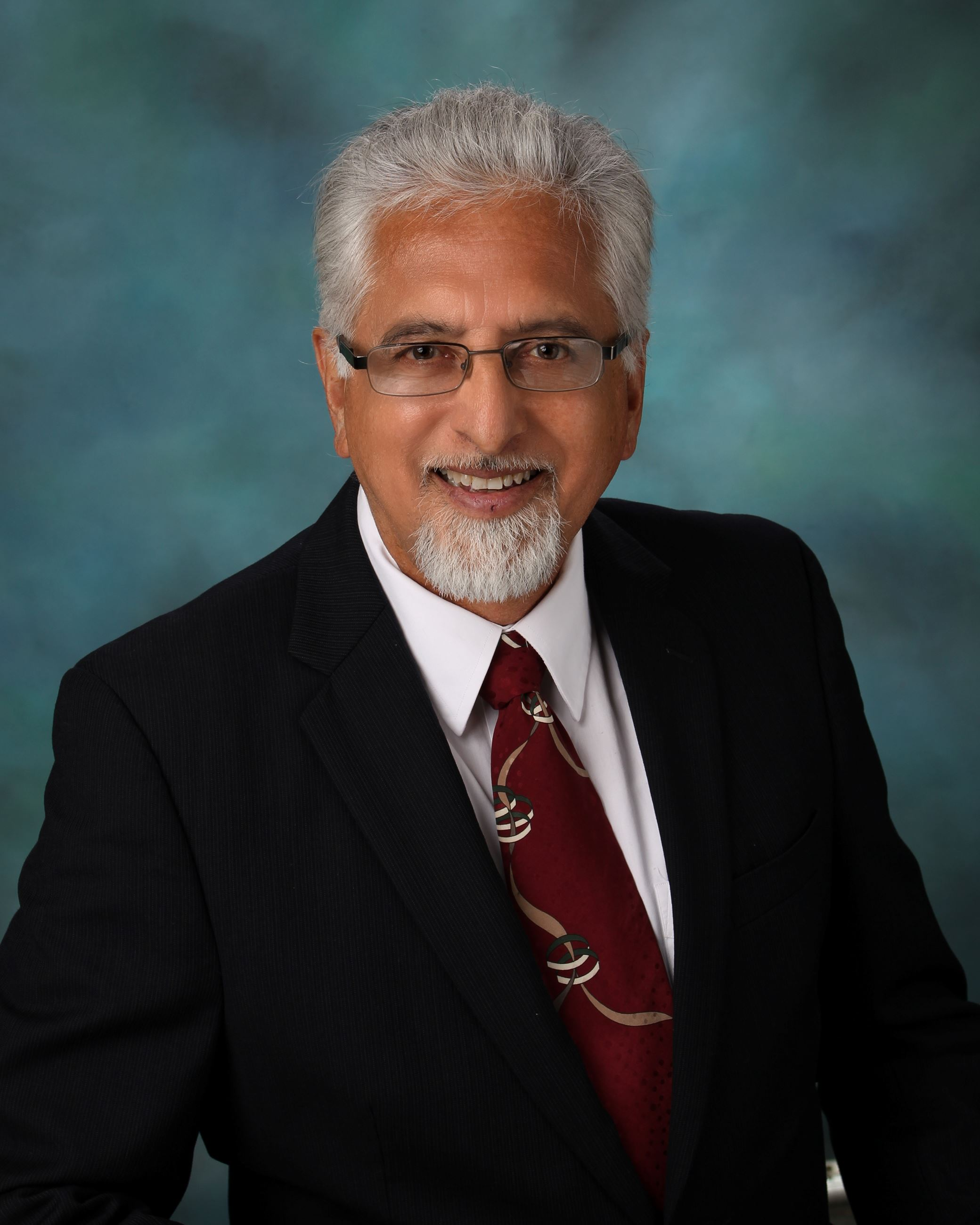
Martinez c. 2023

Eduardo Martinez (born 1949) is an American politician, former teacher, and the mayor of Richmond, California. He is a member of the Democratic Socialists of America and the Richmond Progressive Alliance.

== Life and career ==
Martinez was born in 1949 in Dumas, Texas. He moved to the San Francisco Bay Area in the 1970s. He received a B.A. from San Francisco State University. He taught in the West Contra Costa Unified School District for many years.

Martinez was elected to the Richmond City Council in 2014, and as mayor of Richmond in 2022. In October 2023, he supported a resolution that was passed by the Richmond City Council expressing solidarity with the Palestinian people of Gaza during the 2023 Gaza War. The resolution drew criticism from local Jewish groups for making no mention of Hamas despite taking place just weeks after the October 7 attacks. In 2024, he supported a ballot initiative on oil taxes that resulted in a $550 million settlement from Chevron.

In January 2025, Martinez joined the Richmond City Council in unanimously granting themselves an 80% pay raise.

In December 2025, he reposted content on his LinkedIn account asking for clarification of the post that blamed Israel for the 2025 Bondi Beach shooting. He later deleted the posts and apologized, describing them as a mistake resulting from his illness and affirming that antisemitism predates Israel. In response, the Bay Area chapter of the Jewish Community Relations Council called for Martinez's resignation.
