= Jimmy Dore =

American comedian and political commentator (born 1965)

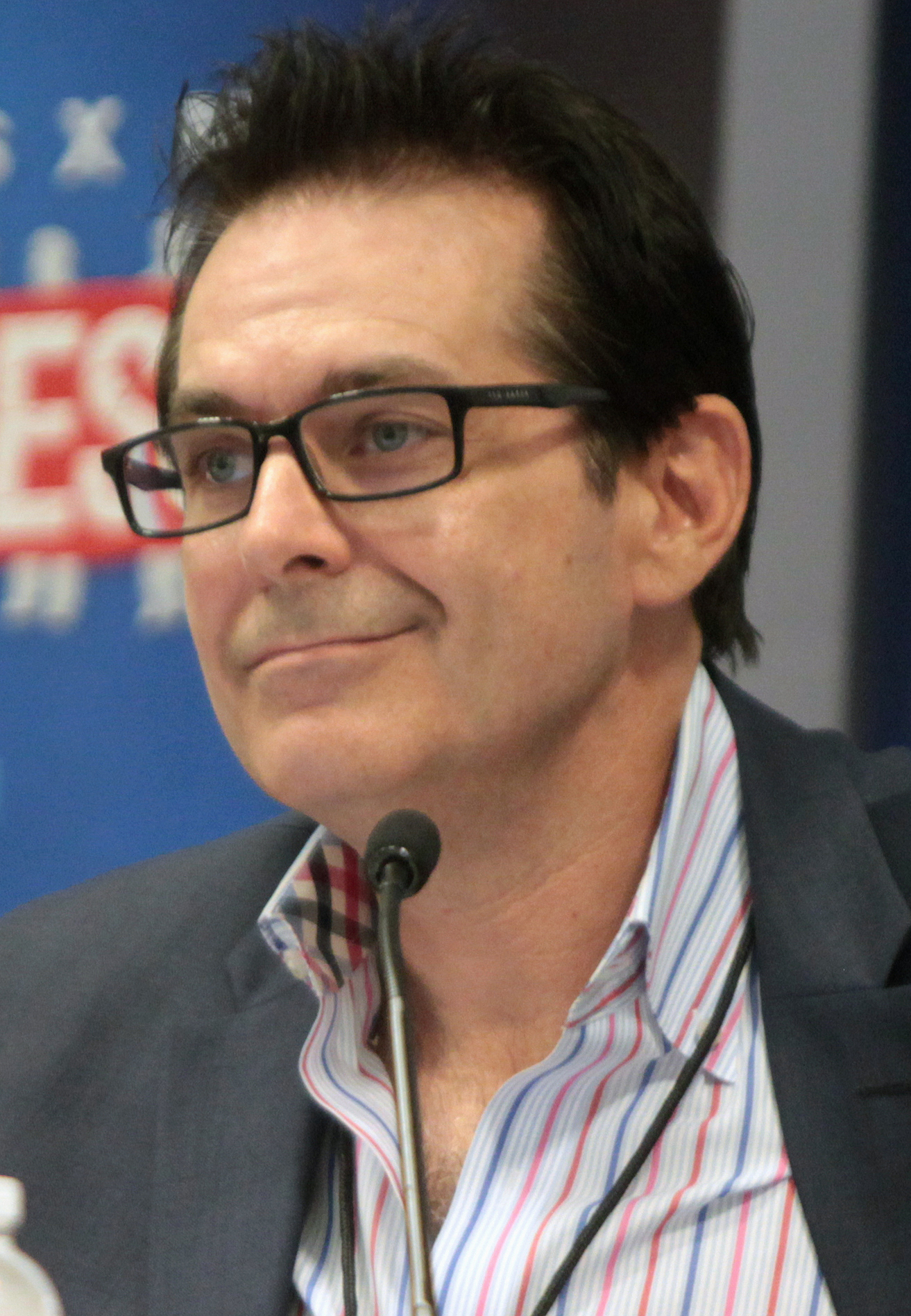
- Dore at the 2016 edition of Politicon
- Born: James Patrick Anthony Dore; July 26, 1965 (age 61); Chicago, Illinois, U.S.
- Education: Illinois State University; Columbia College Chicago (BA)
- Occupations: Stand-up comedian; political commentator
- Years active: 1989–present
- Political party: People's (Note: Non-party affiliation. As of February 2021, Dore was on the advisory council of the People's Party. Dore announced he "will be joining the People's Party officially today" in a video uploaded on March 14, 2021. However, Dore remains a registered independent as the People's Party is not a qualified political party in California.) (2021–present) Independent (2016–2021)
- Other political affiliations: Democratic (until 2016); Green
- Spouse: Stefane Zamorano (m. 2012)

Comedy career
- Medium: Comedy; Radio; Podcast
- Genres: Observational comedy Political satire

Instagram information
- Pages: The Jimmy Dore Show; Jimmy Dore Stand-up Comedy
- Years active: 2020–present
- Followers: 100,000 (December 5, 2025)

TikTok information
- Pages: The Jimmy Dore Show (first account); The Jimmy Dore Show (second account)
- Years active: 2022–2025 (first account); 2025–present (second account)
- Followers: 40,600 (March 24, 2023: first account); 5,515 (December 5, 2025: second account)

X information
- Handle: @jimmy_dore
- Years active: 2009–present
- Topics: Stand-up comedy, politics, current events and opinions
- Followers: 709,800 (December 5, 2025)

YouTube information
- Channel: The Jimmy Dore Show
- Years active: 2011–present
- Subscribers: 1.79 million (February 23, 2026)
- Views: 1.2 billion
- Website: jimmydore.com

James Patrick Anthony Dore (born July 26, 1965) is an American stand-up comedian, political commentator, podcaster and YouTube personality. He is the host of The Jimmy Dore Show, a comedic political talk show available on Rokfin, Rumble, Twitter and YouTube.

Dore started as a comedian in Chicago, Illinois, in 1989 and made several appearances on late night talk shows early in his comedy career. From 2005 onward, his performances increasingly included political commentary. Dore was affiliated with The Young Turks from 2009 to 2019 and appeared on The Young Turks Network show titled Aggressive Progressives. From 2009 to 2021, The Jimmy Dore Show was broadcast on public radio station KPFK 90.7 FM in Los Angeles, California. From 2021 onward, The Jimmy Dore Show became entirely independent and streams live, as well as posts, via Rokfin, Rumble, Twitter and YouTube regularly.

== Early life ==
Dore was born in southwest Chicago, Illinois, on July 26, 1965, into a Catholic family of Polish and Irish descent. He was raised in the blue-collar neighborhood of Vittum Park.

Dore has 11 siblings and is the youngest of seven boys. Due to his large family, Dore grew accustomed to playing to an audience early in life, and he used comedy to avoid beatings from his older brothers. Dore's father was a policeman who owned a brickwork business. Dore has described his father as being a Reagan Democrat, and in Dore's senior year of high school, he argued with his father against Ronald Reagan's presidency.

For 12 years, he attended Catholic schools, followed by Illinois State University, dropping out after three years and gaining employment as a forklift driver. He later graduated from Columbia College Chicago with a degree in marketing communications.

== Career ==
=== Comedy ===
Dore started performing stand-up comedy in Chicago in 1989. In 1995, he moved to Los Angeles, where his first big break was an appearance on Comedy Central's Make Me Laugh. He has said he began pursuing his career after watching many late-night talk shows and thinking he could do better than them. The stand-up comedians that influenced Dore include George Carlin, Jerry Seinfeld and Bill Hicks.

Dore has made appearances as a stand-up comic on late-night television shows such as ABC's Jimmy Kimmel Live!, CBS's The Late Late Show with Craig Kilborn, and NBC's Late Friday. He was the lead performer in a Comedy Central Presents half-hour special on April 9, 2004. He was also a writer-performer for the off-Broadway show The Marijuana-Logues, which ran at the Actor's Playhouse in New York City.

Dore has performed at the Tropicana Comedy Stop in Las Vegas, the Palms' Playboy Comedy Club, Catch a Rising Star (now known as the Laugh Factory) at the Silver Legacy in Reno, and Harrah's on the Las Vegas Strip. He has performed at several comedy festivals, including Just for Laughs in Montreal, the U.S. Comedy Arts Festival, the Melbourne International Comedy Festival and the Amsterdam Comedy Festival, and has also performed for U.S. troops in Afghanistan.

Starting in 2005, Dore moved away from a standard stand-up set to a 50-minute show, which he would later take on tour. Dore launched the new show, Citizen Jimmy, at the Upright Citizens Brigade Theatre (UCB Theatre) in Hollywood. Dore's new act incorporated video clips of politicians, journalists, TV personalities and entertainers, and he expressed surprise that no one else was doing it.

Dore's comedy style was described in 2006 by The Central New Jersey Home News Tribune as incendiary and "based on what makes most in the States angry and uncomfortable." An article in the Chicago Tribune compared Dore's stand-up, where he "riffs off the faux pas and flubs of famous folks", to Jon Stewart's The Daily Show.

In May 2008, Dore launched the podcast Comedy and Everything Else. The show was co-hosted by Todd Glass, who departed from the show in late 2009, and then by Dore's wife Stefane Zamorano. Comedians who were guests on the podcast included Jim Gaffigan, David Spade, Maria Bamford and Kyle Cease.

In August 2008, Comedy Central aired Dore's hour-long special Citizen Jimmy, based on his UCB show of the same name. The special was chosen "Best of 2008" by iTunes, and its accompanying DVD was cited as one of the five best comedy DVDs of the year by Punchline Magazine. That year, Dore also appeared in the documentary film Super High Me.

Dore hosted a monthly show, Left, Right & Ridiculous, at the UCB Theatre. His first book, Your Country Is Just Not That Into You, was published in 2014. Another comedy special, Sentenced to Live, was released on October 6, 2015.

=== The Jimmy Dore Show ===
In June 2009, Dore began producing The Jimmy Dore Show, a weekly one-hour comedic look at the news, which originated at KPFK 90.7 FM in Los Angeles and aired nationally on the Pacifica Radio Network, ending in 2021. The show aired online via political commentary show The Young Turks' TYT Network from 2009 to 2019. Dore appeared as a frequent guest host on Current TV's broadcast television version of TYT, The Young Turks with Cenk Uygur, and continued working with Uygur on The Young Turks online. In June 2012, Dore launched an incarnation of The Jimmy Dore Show on YouTube via the TYT Network show The Point with Ana Kasparian. Dore soon launched his own YouTube channel, broadcasting from his garage, which by 2019 featured near-daily videos and weekly livestreams. In July 2017, Dore began hosting his own show on the TYT network called "Aggressive Progressives".

A 2017 article in The Boston Globe said YouTube demonetization was not only impacting hate videos, but also controversial content from people such as Dore and Trump supporters, Diamond and Silk.

On April 13, 2019, during a livestream, Dore officially announced his departure from the TYT Network, citing a desire to focus on his own show and his live performances.

==== Controversies ====
During the COVID-19 pandemic, Dore promoted misleading information about the efficacy and safety of vaccines, even though he had been vaccinated. The anti-parasitic drug ivermectin was promoted on his program as a treatment for COVID-19 although there is no medical evidence to support this.

In a July 2020 video, Dore erroneously said Joe Biden had once "hosted a black face affair with a bunch of rich white people", showing an altered clip that had been circulating on social media since January, which had darkened the face of black singer Jerome Powell. The video received more than 100,000 views in one day and has since been removed from YouTube.

In January 2021, Dore interviewed Zackary Clark, a member of the anti-government, far-right extremist Boogaloo movement. Clark used the pseudonym "Magnus Panvidya". Dore tweeted that he was "completely floored" to have learned during the course of the interview that Panvidya supported Black Lives Matter and LGBTQ rights and opposed racism, police brutality, war and U.S. Immigration and Customs Enforcement. In an opinion piece on The Daily Beast, Alexander Reid Ross described Dore's interview as being a "public-relations disaster". According to Ross, filmmaker Rod Webber told Dore in a subsequent interview that he should "vet [people like Panvidya] more before putting them out on the internet to tons of people, to let them just say what they want to say unchecked."

==== Discussion of conspiracy theories ====
In May 2017, Dore discussed conspiracy theories on the murder of Seth Rich on his show. According to Salon, Dore continued to insist that there were "a lot of red flags" and there was "probably something more to this story" after the source of much of the conspiracy theory was discredited. In December 2020, an article in New York magazine said Dore's discernment was questionable, due in part to his "promotion of conspiracy theories implicating the Democratic National Committee (DNC) in Seth Rich's death".

In 2017, Dore argued that the chemical weapons attack on the opposition-held town of Khan Sheikhun was likely to have been a "false flag", orchestrated by groups opposed to Bashar al-Assad. The investigative journalism site Bellingcat reported that Dore received $2,500 from the Association for Investment in Popular Action Committees in 2017. The Association is responsible for the Serena Shim Award and is described by Bellingcat as a pro-Assad lobby group. According to Bellingcat, Dore featured Eva Bartlett in "another 2017 conspiracy-theory segment" about Syria.

In 2018, according to Stephen Shalom writing in New Politics, Dore cited an op-ed which quoted US Secretary of Defense Jim Mattis out of context as saying that he did not have evidence that the nerve agent sarin was used in Syria. Mattis, speaking in a press conference in February 2018, had been referring to recent reports when he said "the sarin reports are being examined but have not yet been confirmed or disconfirmed by the United States," adding that Assad's government had "been caught using" sarin during the Obama administration and "used it again during our administration".

===== Briefing of the UN Security Council =====
Dore addressed the UN Security Council in a session in September 2023. During the session, which was initiated by the Russian Federation, Dore referred to a statement by US President Joe Biden from February 2022. In the statement, Biden had warned that, if Russia were to invade Ukraine, "there will no longer be a Nord Stream 2 project. We will bring an end to it."

Dore also stated that the US was supporting Ukraine with extensive military aid to prolong the conflict and prevent a peaceful resolution. He said that an economic war was underway between the West and Russia "to fill the pockets of rapacious capitalists who pull the strings of the Government of the United States and dictate its foreign policy".

== Political views ==
Dore said his stand-up shifted to be more political in 2005, describing his new style as "'stickin' it to the man' kind of comedy." A 2019 article in the Chicago Tribune observed that Dore's material critiqued "Wall Street, the military industrial complex, Big Pharma, political operatives and mainstream media".

In a July 2008 interview, Dore said part of him wanted Barack Obama as president but "as a comedian, it would be much better if John McCain became president". Dore said that "whenever a conservative is in office, it's great for comedy", citing a "boom in comedy" during the administrations of Ronald Reagan and George W. Bush.

A Los Angeles Times article said The Jimmy Dore Show was a progressive program that had "affection for [Bernie] Sanders and disdain for establishment Democratic politics." Dore supported Bernie Sanders' campaign in the 2016 Democratic Party presidential primaries, being called "Sanders-obsessed" by The Washington Post. During the 2020 Democratic primary election, Dore was critical of Senator Elizabeth Warren for not defending Sanders when Sanders was accused of being misogynistic.

In 2016, Dore said that a Hillary Clinton presidency would be worse for progressives than a Donald Trump presidency, saying: "don't freak out about a Donald Trump presidency! I think, in fact, my theory is that it's even better for progressives in the short-term, meaning in the two-year term, and in four years for sure."

A Washington Post article in 2017 stated that, following the 2016 presidential election, Dore had "lit into Democrats for blaming hackers for their loss, raised doubts about the credibility of intelligence agencies, and seen the heavy hand of war hawks hyping the Russia connection to destabilize Europe and the Middle East." Dore was a staunch critic of the Special Counsel investigation into potential collusion between the Trump campaign and Russia. In September 2017, Dore said, "if you don't think we need a third party, you're not paying attention."

In June 2020, an article in The New York Times described Dore as an "ardent critic" of Joe Biden.

In December 2020, Dore circulated a plan to make Nancy Pelosi's re-election as Speaker of the House conditional on Medicare for All receiving a floor vote. The plan was endorsed by Justin Jackson of the Los Angeles Chargers, political commentators Kyle Kulinski, Krystal Ball and Briahna Joy Gray and Cornel West. Alexandria Ocasio-Cortez criticized the proposal to use her leverage for scheduling a vote that was unlikely to pass. Dore told his viewers Ocasio-Cortez was "standing between you and health care" and, in response to her argument that progressive breakthroughs require years of organizing, Dore said, "I figured this out in two weeks, AOC! You liar. You coward. You gaslighter." Journalists David Sirota and Ryan Grim said that progressives should use their leverage for other purposes. Dore and his supporters responded that a vote on Medicare For All would inform the public of which elected officials opposed a reform that Americans overwhelmingly supported.

In a 2021 interview on Fox Nation by Tucker Carlson, Dore said that the United States is an oligarchy dominated by two corporate parties that are unaccountable to the general population. He said Joe Biden and the Democratic Party use identity politics to placate their political base to avoid having to implement progressive policies like raising the minimum wage, forgiving student debt, or establishing single-payer healthcare.

Dore was on the People's Party's Advisory Council.

== Reception ==
In a May 2016 article for Vulture, as part of their "Pod-Canon" series highlighting "the greatest individual comedy-related podcast episodes of all time", Nathan Rabin praised an episode of Dore's podcast Comedy and Everything Else, where Dore had criticized guest Kyle Cease for his controversial $3,000 stand-up comedy boot camp course. Rabin described Dore as being a "well-respected [comedy] veteran" and "purist" who believed the art of stand-up was "rooted in suffering", and that it could not be taught in a classroom. Conversely, in Vulture's original 2010 review of the episode, Joe Berkowitz had described Dore's interview with Cease as an "attempt at gotcha journalism that couldn't be any clunkier", adding that he could not "see how someone could walk away from this episode wanting to hear more from Jimmy Dore."

Stephen Shalom, writing in New Politics, has called Dore "Islamophobic", "conspiracist" and an "apologist for Assad". Shalom said Green Party candidate Howie Hawkins "made a serious error" when he shared a platform with Dore, which led to the International Socialist Organization's New York City chapter rescinding its endorsement of Hawkins in the 2018 New York gubernatorial election.

In 2018, an article published on CNNMoney described Dore's show as a "far-left YouTube channel that peddles conspiracy theories, such as the idea that Syrian chemical weapons attacks are hoaxes". Dore defended his show, stating, "We actually debunk conspiracy theories like the one that says Assad gassed his own people".

In 2019, comedian Reginald D. Hunter said The Jimmy Dore Show had "a familiar soothing American impishness", and that Dore made "caustically smart observations of the American political left." The Chicago Tribune described Dore as possessing a "potent political voice". In an opinion piece for Haaretz, Alexander Reid Ross described Dore as a "conspiracy theorist" and a "Kremlin defender".

== Personal life ==
Dore lived with his wife Stefane Zamorano in Pasadena, California, from 1997 until 2020, when the couple purchased a home in Studio City, Los Angeles. Although critical of organized religion, Dore identifies as spiritual.

=== Sexual harassment allegation ===
In 2021, Ana Kasparian, Cenk Uygur's co-host, accused Dore of having sexually harassed her when they had worked together at The Young Turks, alleging that Dore had made numerous sexually inappropriate comments to her, including while she was teaching a college course to a group of students. Responding to this allegation, Dore said that Kasparian had dressed "unbelievably inappropriately for a newsroom" and that, after she had "bent over in front of [him]" exposing herself, he had said "nice news skirt", which "humiliated her". Dore said he later gave Kasparian an apology note following the incident. Kasparian has since stated that she believes Dore's description of the event contained inaccuracies and alleged that the event Dore referred to was not the first time he had directed inappropriate comments towards her.

== Discography ==
- It's Not Brain Surgery (Jimmy Dore, 2000)
- Really? (Jimmy Dore, 2008)
- Citizen Jimmy (Image Entertainment, 2008)
- Sentenced to Live (Comedy Dynamics, 2015)
