= Tom Butt =

American politician (born 1944)

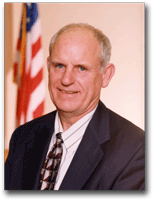

6th Mayor of Richmond, California
- In office January 13, 2015 – January 10, 2023
- Preceded by: Gayle McLaughlin
- Succeeded by: Eduardo Martinez

Personal details
- Born: Thomas King Butt; March 23, 1944 (age 81) Albuquerque, New Mexico, U.S.
- Party: Democratic
- Spouse: Shirley (m. 1971)
- Children: 2
- Education: University of Arkansas (BA, BArch); University of California, Los Angeles (MArch)

Military service
- Branch/service: United States Army
- Battles/wars: Vietnam War

Thomas King Butt (born March 23, 1944) is an American politician and architect and the former mayor of Richmond, California. He was vice-mayor in 2002 and 2012 and a member of the Richmond City Council for over 20 years before being elected mayor. He is the longest continuously serving council member in Richmond's history.

== Early life and education ==
Butt was born in Albuquerque, New Mexico, and raised in Fayetteville, Arkansas. His father, Thomas F. Butt, served in the United States Army during World War II and later became a judge in Arkansas. Butt's mother was a librarian in the Fayetteville Public Library. Butt earned a Bachelor of Arts and Bachelor of Architecture from the University of Arkansas, followed by a Master of Architecture from the University of California, Los Angeles.

== Career ==
As an undergraduate, Butt spent summers working for the United States Forest Service in Montana, Hawaii, and San Francisco. Butt joined the United States Army Corps of Engineers in 1966 and was deployed to Vietnam shortly after. He served until 1970. After leaving the Army, Butt married his wife, Shirley, in 1971. They lived in Marin County, California before moving to Richmond in 1973.

Butt is the president of Interactive Resources, a local architectural firm. He is also a contractor and former real estate broker. Butt founded and is the president of the East Brother Light Station, Inc., a non-profit organization focused on maintaining the historic East Brother Island Lighthouse on East Brother Island, a Bay Area landmark on the National Register of Historic Places. Butt founded and remains a board member of Rosie the Riveter Trust (named for Rosie the Riveter), the non-profit partner of Rosie the Riveter World War II Home Front National Historical Park located in Richmond.

=== Politics ===
He won the Richmond mayoral election of 2014 and succeeded Gayle McLaughlin as mayor. He was sworn in by Lieutenant Governor Gavin Newsom on Tuesday, January 13, 2015. His relationships with other city leaders deteriorated over time, and in 2021, he said "I’m pretty much a lame duck" and indicated that he would exit political life.

Since leaving office, Butt has filed lawsuits against the city of Richmond, Mayor Eduardo Martinez, and Vice-Mayor Gayle McLaughlin.
