= John Gioia =

American politician

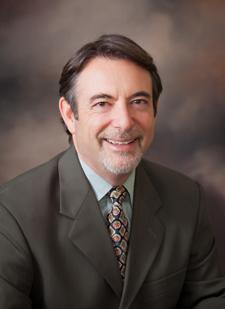
- Portrait of John Gioia
- Education: UC Berkeley School of Law
- Occupation: County Supervisor
- Years active: 1998 to Present
- Political party: Democratic

John Gioia is an American politician. He has served on the Contra Costa County Board of Supervisors in Contra Costa County, California since 1998 and was re-elected three times. He served as chair in 2002, 2006 and 2010. Contra Costa supervisorial seats are non-partisan.

== History ==
John Gioia was first elected to the Contra Costa Board of Supervisors in 1998, after successfully challenging incumbent Jim Rogers, and has been re-elected six times. He served as chair due to the regular rotation of the role amongst the Supervisors, most recently in 2023.

Gioia represents 210,000 residents in the westernmost urban area of the county including the cities of El Cerrito, Richmond, San Pablo, and part of Pinole, and the unincorporated communities of Bayview, East Richmond Heights, El Sobrante, Kensington, Montalvin Manor, Tara Hills, North Richmond, and Rollingwood.

Gioia is a recognized leader in Bay Area regional government on air quality issues. He was appointed by Governor Brown to serve on the California Air Resources Board in 2012 and has served on the Bay Area Air Quality Management District Board since 2006 (serving as chair in 2012).

Gioia advocates on behalf of county government, sitting on the Board of Directors of the California State Association of Counties and serving as president of that organization in 2014. He chairs the Bay Area Joint Policy Committee (which coordinates the planning for the four regional government agencies), and serves as vice-chair of the San Francisco Bay Restoration Authority and previously served on the Doctors Medical Center governing board before its demise. Gioia also serves on the California Cities Counties Schools Partnership Board, Association of Bay Area Governments executive board, San Francisco Bay Conservation and Development Commission, Bay Area Regional Airport Planning Committee, RYSE Youth Center Board, El Sobrante Boys and Girls Club Advisory Board, and the Bay Area Social Equity Caucus Steering Committee.

He joined congressman then George Miller, Richmond city councilman Nat Bates and others in protesting the eviction of a popular pastor in 2010.

In 2016 he opposed development in landslide prone areas of rural and unincorporated El Sobrante Valley.

In 2017 he was involved in a feud with the county sheriff over expansion of West County Detention Center in Richmond, which he opposed, in the end he ended up creating a re-entry program for justice-involved people that the sheriff also opposed. He also supported more affordable housing supported by 15 bills signed into law by Jerry Brown in 2017.

In 2018 he helped launch a deportation defense hotline for illegal aliens living in the area to help them with available resources.

Similar to the issue in 2010 in 2019 alongside congressman Mark DeSaulnier he urged a retirement home in San Pablo and its landlord to extend the stay for its many elderly residents.

Also in 2019 he criticized the NuStar refinery in Crockett for taking 48-minutes to call 911 emergency for a major out of control fire at its facility. He also supports Kensington remaining unincorporated citing its minor tax base but supporting its limited self-governance.

=== Indian gaming ===
Gioia is largely opposed to the expansion of urban gaming proposed by Native American Indian gaming interests. These projects include the failed billion dollar Point Molate proposal, Casino San Pablo upgrades from card club to full scale, and the successful Sugar Bowl Casino by the Guideville, Lytton, and Scotts Valley bands of Pomo Indians respectively.

== Political career ==
In 1999 he voiced criticism of four refineries in the county particularly the Chevron Richmond Refinery for not having written policies on disaster response including the accidental release of contaminants.

In 2003 Gioia joined Loni Hancock, Irma Anderson, and other area residents and politicians to protest and oppose the entry of Walmart into Hilltop Mall, however this was eventually unsuccessful.

In 2005 he proposed banning new Indian Reservations and gambling institutions in the county and also approved a measure to fine each supervisor $1 for every instance of bureaucratic mumbo jumbo.

In 2017, the California Fair Political Practices Commission recommended a $14,000 fine for Gioia, levied for missed deadlines in filing multiple documents related to campaign contributions and expenditures.

In 2018, Gioia traveled out of the country on a refinery junket to visit petroleum tar sands as a guest of oil companies.

== Personal life ==
He is an alumnus of El Cerrito High School and U.C. Berkeley where he received a bachelor's degree in political science. This was followed by a J.D. degree from Boalt Hall and a working career in business and land use law in his hometown and San Francisco. In 2002, Gioia married Jennifer Peck, who served as his treasurer before their legal separation in 2013 and divorce in 2016. Gioia lives in Richmond and is the parent of Christopher and Emilia, both of whom attended local public schools.
