= Point Molate =

Point Molate may refer to:

- Point Molate Beach Park, a city-owned park in Richmond, California
- Winehaven, California, a winery and town in Richmond, California, that later became a fuel depot for the United States Navy
- Point Molate Naval Fuel Depot, a decommissioned U.S. Navy fueling station on the western coast of Richmond, California
- Point Molate casino project, a proposed casino at Point Molate Naval Fuel Depot proposed by the Guideville Band of Pomo Indians
- Point Molate Hills, a chaparral and forested escarpment that crests northwest to southeast along the San Pablo Peninsula in Richmond, California
- Point Molate Marsh, a salt marsh on the western shoreline of the San Pablo Peninsula in Richmond, California
- Point Molate Peninsula, a landform in western Richmond, California
- Point San Pablo Yacht Harbor, an isolated marina and small community at the far end of Point San Pablo in Richmond, California
