= Pinole Valley High School =

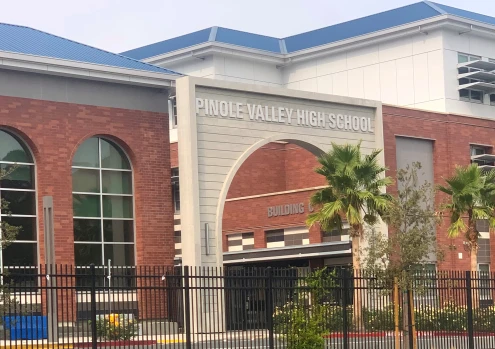

Location
- 2901 Pinole Valley Road; Pinole, California 94564; United States; 37.9910°N 122.2860°W

Information
- Type: Public
- Opened: 1967
- School district: West Contra Costa Unified School District
- Principal: Todd Irving
- Teaching staff: 55.54 (FTE)
- Grades: 9-12
- Enrollment: 1,292 (2023–2024)
- Student to teacher ratio: 23.26
- Color
- Athletics conference: CIF North Coast Section - BSC - TCAL
- Mascot: Spartan
- Website: pinolevalley.wccusd.net

Pinole Valley High School is a high school in Pinole, California, United States, in Contra Costa County. First opened in 1967, the school is part of the West Contra Costa Unified School District. Pinole Valley High serves grades 9–12, and has approximately 1,200 students from Pinole, northwest Richmond and the unincorporated communities of Bayview, Montalvin Manor and Tara Hills. The school is noted for its girls' basketball team. Coach Dan O'Shea was named "Coach of the Year" in May 2006 by the Oakland Tribune.

== Curriculum ==
=== Academic Study Programs ===
Pinole Valley High offers several programs for students, such as Advanced Placement classes, CPA Career Academy classes offered through its Health and Engineering academies, Jazz Band, Choir, Piano, American Sign Language, and award-winning Performing and Visual Arts programs.

In 2019, Pinole Valley High School gained status as an International Baccalaureate World School. Pinole Valley High School was the only high school in West Contra Costa Unified School District to have the International Baccalaureate program and the second high school in Contra Costa County, with Ygnacio Valley High School being first. The PVHS IB Diploma Programme began offering IB class selections in the 2020–2021 school year, but ended with the 2025-2026 school year.

=== Notable Music Program ===
The school has a notable music program as well. The Spartan Marching Band performs in several Pinole events and used to, on a larger scale, in venues such as the San Francisco Chinese New Year Parade and Disneyland in Anaheim, California.

== The End to "Portable Valley High" ==
Pinole Valley High School was dubbed "Portable Valley High" by the students and community as the high school had been housed in temporary portables at the site of Creekside Park. The temporary campus served high-school students in Pinole and surrounding areas for over five years from 2014 until 2019. The temporary campus was plagued with problems such as rodent infestations, constant disrepair and flooding, which came to an end as the new campus came into fruition.

After five years, a temporary campus, and over $200 million, Pinole Valley High School opened its new campus on August 12, 2019, with Principal Kibby Kleiman in tow to cut the ribbon.

== Notable alumni ==
- Billie Joe Armstrong, lead singer, Green Day (attended but did not graduate)
- Jeff Becerra, Lead Singer of Possessed
- Darrick Brilz, National Football League player
- Thomas DeCoud, National Football League player
- Luke Dennison, professional soccer player
- Mike Dirnt, Bassist for Green Day
- Jocelyn Enriquez, Singer
- Travis Feeney, United Football League player
- Denzil Foster, Record Producer/Songwriter
- Jeff Harris, Major League Baseball player
- Nathan Haynes, Major League Baseball player
- Iamsu!, Rapper
- P-Lo, Producer/Rapper
- Larry LaLonde, guitarist, Primus and Possessed
- Steve Lucero, former national champion speedway rider
- Chris Singleton, former Major League Baseball player
- DeNesha Stallworth, basketball player and coach
- Dale Sveum, former Major League Baseball player and manager
- Gino Torretta, 1992 Heisman Trophy winner and former National Football League player
