= Jim Rogers (California politician) =

American politician, attorney

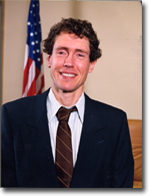
- The People's Lawyer
- Born: 1955 (age 70–71)
- Occupations: Former lawyer, politician
- Years active: 1988-present

Jim Rogers (born September 10, 1955) is an American politician. He served on the Contra Costa County Board of Supervisors in the 1990s, and was a city council member for the city of Richmond, California for three terms. He was first elected to the city council in 2002, and his final term expired in January 2015. He is a Democrat, considered a moderate, and has also been referred to as a progressive. He was called the San Francisco Bay Area's most famous lawyer because of television ads in which he dubbed himself as "The People's Lawyer".

== Early life and education ==
Rogers is native of Ohio. He is a graduate of University of California, Berkeley and University of California, Davis School of Law (King Hall). He was admitted to the California bar in 1980.

== History ==
=== 1980s to 2000s ===
In 1988 he wrote a law regarding campaign finance reform. This was later struck down by the courts, but it gave him name recognition.

From 1994 to 1998 he was a member of the board of supervisors of Contra Costa County, California. While a county supervisor he worked on educating the business community on how to bid on public contracts. He lost re-election to John Gioia a former supporter of his that ran on a campaign focusing on Rogers alleged absence from the day-to-day affairs of Contra Costa County voters.

=== 2000s-present ===
Rogers was a city council member for the city of Richmond, California for three terms. He was first elected to the council in 2002 and the re-elected in 2006. In an interview with Richmond Confidential he stated his biggest contributions to Richmond while in office where the halving of the homicide rate, a 31-year low of unemployment, and saving Kennedy High School and other schools from closure all on a tight budget.

2004 brought his support for the Guideville Band of Pomo Indians Point Molate Naval Fuel Depot site casino stating it was an enormous opportunity for jobs. Although no longer in office, Rogers is currently working on funding for various sustainability projects in Richmond.

In 2009 he was supportive of edible front yard gardens along with then mayor Gayle McGlaughlin. In 2014 he opposed a blanket minimum wage increase while supporting it for many business however citing that some businesses would leave the city he pushed for exemptions for certain employers, mostly those with smaller payrolls.

In 2014 he negotiated "the Richmond Promise" with Chevron Corporation master of the city's Richmond Chevron Refinery wherein the corporation would shelve out $35 million in scholarships for every Richmond college student attending a technical, community, four-year-university. He has also stated that Chevron took a "leaner, meaner" attitude toward Richmondites in recent years in 2008.

In 2015 there was an attempt to appoint him to a vacant seat on the Richmond city council to avoid the costs of a special election since he was the next runner up in the city's ranked choice voting system. This did not happen.
