= Point Potrero =

- Cape
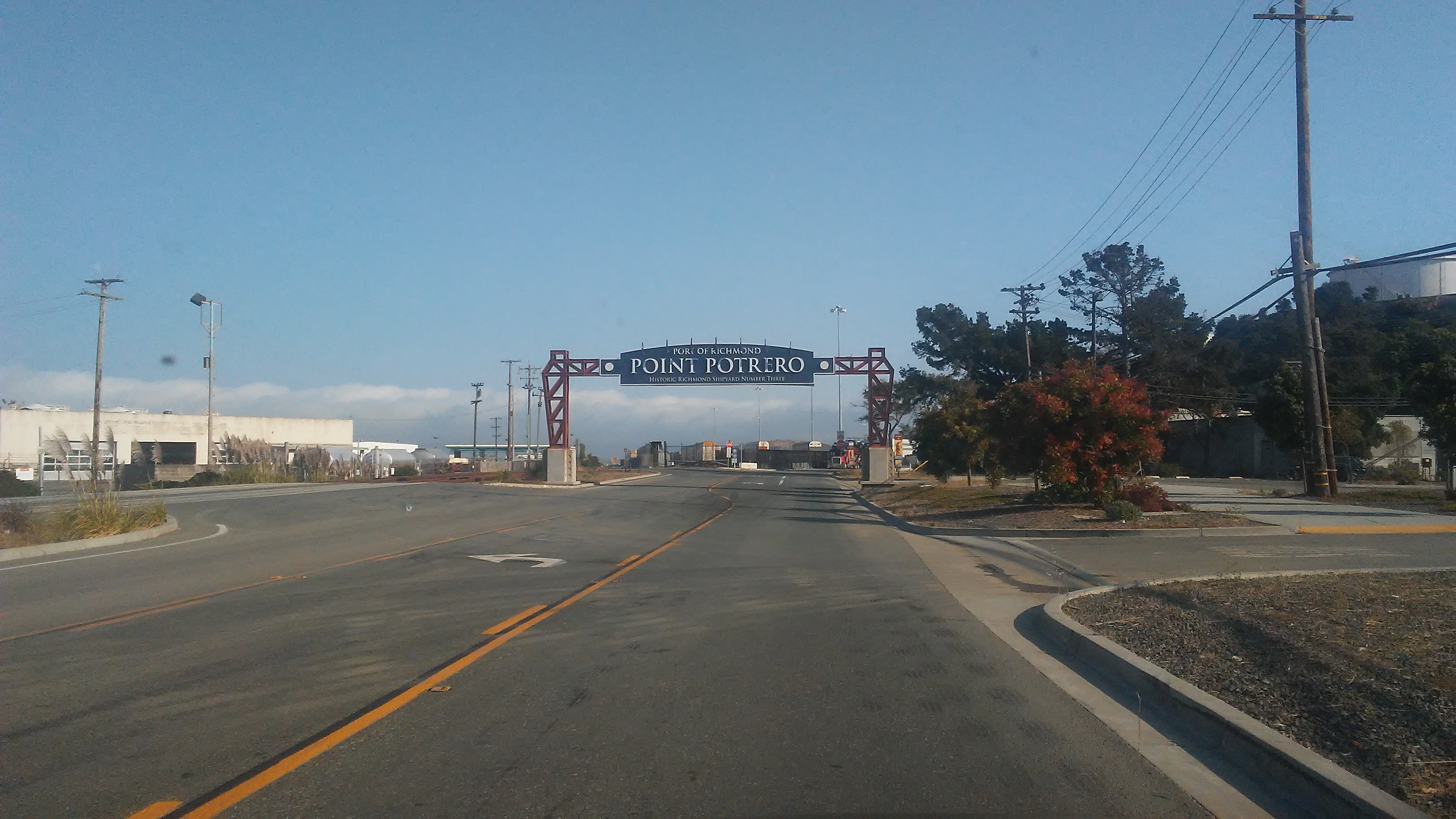
- Point Potrero gate

- location of Point Potrero in California
- Coordinates: 37°54′15″N 122°21′59″W
- Location: Contra Costa County, California
- Topo map: USGS Richmond

Point Potrero is a point in San Pablo Bay forming a cape and hugging the Potrero Hills in Richmond, California.

The cape is covered with chaparral and lies between San Pablo Bay to the west and north, and Castro Cove to the east. The Chevron Richmond Refinery and Potrero Ridge lay just east of the point. Winehaven lies on its western slopes, and was once the largest winery in the United States. The area is currently isolated from the urban core and serves as habitat for deer and other creatures. The southern end of the ridge developed with many houses in the historic Point Richmond neighborhood. Part of the western coast is part of Point Molate Regional Park.
