= John Márquez =

American politician and activist

Member of the Richmond City Council
- In office 1993–2008; 1985–1991

Vice Mayor of Richmond, California
- In office 1998; 1990

Personal details
- Born: Taos, New Mexico, U.S.
- Party: Democratic
- Spouse: Maria
- Children: 5
- Education: San Francisco State University (AA, BA)

Military service
- Branch/service: United States Army
- Battles/wars: Lebanese Civil War

John E. Márquez is an American politician and activist who has held various positions in Richmond, California city government. For eighteen years, Márquez served as a city councilman. He was the first Latino to serve on the Richmond City Council. Originally he was an appointee to the council in 1985 and won an election to that seat in 1987; he subsequently lost his second bid in 1991. He was elected again in 1993 and twice more in 1997 and 2004. In 1990 and 1998, he served as vice mayor. Márquez was defeated for re-election in 2008, and lost a mayoral bid in 2001 to Gayle McLaughlin. In addition to his elected offices in the city of Richmond, he has held various other positions in Contra Costa County, California on various commissions.

== Early life and education ==
He was born in Taos, New Mexico and later attended Bishop Union High School after his family moved to Bishop, California. He has served in the United States Army as an MP and was stationed in Lebanon. He was awarded the American Expeditionary Service Medal for his service. He retired as a labor standards investigator.

While taking classes at Contra Costa College in 1969, he founded the Latino Club and the "La Raza Studies department" in 1970. He later became an adjunct professor at the college. He transferred to San Francisco State University, where he received his associate's and bachelor's degrees. He also attended the University of California, Hastings College of the Law, but did not earn a degree. He completed further graduate studies at California State University, Hayward and San Jose State University in order to obtain teaching credentials. He was certified to instruct Spanish, psychology, and ethnic studies.

== Career ==
Márquez began his career in the Richmond human relations department. He later worked in the California Department of Industrial Relations, where he eventually served as deputy labor commissioner. Márquez is also a professional Spanish interpreter and owns a business, Márquez and Associates. During his career, he has been a member of the county Democratic Central Committee in addition to being a delegate to the station committee.

=== 1985–2004 ===
He was originally appointed to the City Council to fill a vacancy in 1985. He was the first Latino on the council and remained the only one for fourteen years.

In 1999, he expressed relief that the city settled out of court with former recreation director and financial mismanagement whistleblower Brad Baxter. In 2005 he supported efforts to mitigate the spike in crime in Richmond stating, "Our purpose is to take pro-active steps by implementing a firearm violence prevention action plan through a collaborative effort with the Richmond Police Department, the faith community, the state and federal law enforcement agencies and the citizens of the city..."

Márquez lost his seat in 2001 during a run for mayor, but was re-elected in 2004 with support from the unions representing Richmond police officers and firefighters. He was also supported in 2004 by the Keep Richmond Safe Committee that was accused of "mudslinging" and whose campaign was developed by a former city fire captain that underwent house arrest and FBI investigations for vote buying

=== 2006–present ===
He was re-elected in 2006 and was chosen vice mayor by his colleagues. In 2007, he expressed support for the city's undocumented illegal residents saying the city had a responsibility to investigate the raids by immigration enforcement. He also sponsored legislation the expand the University of California Berkeley facilities at the Richmond Field Station along with Nat Bates and Maria Viramontes.

He was defeated for re-election in 2008. Also in 2008 he was part of the "Chevron 5" along with councilmembers Maria Viramontes, Harpreet Sandhu, Ludmyrna Lopez, and Nat Bates supporting massive expansion of the Chevron Richmond Refinery. He also opposed measure T, a voter initiative passed by the people of Richmond that taxed the company 16,000,000 dollars annually in order to pay for city services. Also at this time Chevron Corporation gave BAPAC $1,500 that was used in his campaign.

In 2009 he continued to support the Guideville Band of Pomo Indians plan to build a Las Vegas style casino on the former Point Molate Fuel Depot and Winehaven National Historic District, citing the jobs potential. In 2012 he was supportive of memorializing the Marina Bay Parkway underpass for fallen Richmond Police Department officer Bradley Moody of which is said was "gentle" and "always smiling".

In April 2012 he was appointed to represent the Contra Costa Community College District on the as-yet-unnamed successor organization to the Pinole Redevelopment Agency. He is an elected board member for the college district with a term that will expire in 2014.

== Recognition ==
He was the 2006 Contra Costa County Hispanic of the Year. For his years of distinguished service he was honored by a California assembly resolution for outstanding community service by state assemblyman Robert Campbell of California's 11th district.

== Personal life ==
He and his wife, Marie, have five children.
