= Winehaven =

Winehaven may refer to:

- Winehaven Winery, winery and vineyard in Chisago City, MN
- Winehaven, California, former winery and city in California
