= Richmond City Council (California) =

The Richmond City Council is the governing body for the city of Richmond, California. The council consists of the Mayor of Richmond and six other city council members, one designated Vice Mayor. The council members are all elected from the whole city; no members are elected by district or ward. The council members are elected to four-year terms, as opposed to the previous six-year terms. They are not all elected at once. The council members meet every first and third Tuesday of the month and, if necessary, hold special meetings on the remaining Tuesdays. Presently the entire city council is Democratic.

== History ==
=== Controversies ===
After Gayle McLaughlin's victory in 2006, the council appointed Harpreet Sandhu who had been the city's Human Relations Director to her vacant city council person seat. The fact that public input was not considered and that the candidates were not revealed to the public outraged many in the community. This led to the passage of an ordinance allowing anyone who can obtain 20 registered voters to sign a petition in their favor to be able to register with the city for a vacant seat. The petition was added to get the vote of council member Nate Bates, who considered passing the law without such a requirement would turn the city council appointments into an American Idol style circus.

Mayor McLaughlin voted against this measure since she thought the city needed to overhaul the process entirely to make it more democratic. Her campaign manager and vocal community activist Juan Reardon called the new ordinance a "travesty."

The council has been noted in the media for frivolous and unproductive bickering, especially between Tom Butt and María Viramontes. The council has been noted for having two distinct and opposing factions consisting of: Viramontes, López, Sandhu and sometimes Bates which conflicts with the remaining fellowship of McGlaughlin, Butt, Ritterman, and sometimes Rogers.

=== 2010s ===
In 2015, Thomas K. Butt was elected mayor. The vice mayor is Ben Choi. They serve alongside councilmen Nathanial Bates, Eduardo Martinez, Demnlus Johnson, Jael Myrick, and Melvin Willis

In 2010, the council passed an ordinance approving of unlimited cannabis dispensaries. This was supported by Nat Bates, Gayle McGlaughlin, Jim Rogers, and Jeff Ritterman, while opposed by Myrna López, María Viramontes, and Tom Butt. The majority stated that they liked the idea of more but smaller operations decentralizing the activity in the city. Also in 2010, the council ponied up 1.5 million US dollars to keep John F. Kennedy High School and two elementary schools from being closed due to lack of funding. This was supported by Myrna López

In 2011, the council voted in its majority with Nat Bates and Jim Rogers dissenting to cancel the Point Molate casino project and give the developer and tribe 120 days to propose an alternate use for the former Navy site.

2014 saw the continuing strength of the Richmond Progressive Alliance's candidates winning a majority of the council for its third straight election.

In 2018, the city finally resolved the matter of the former Point Molate Naval Fuel Depot, approving mostly housing and some businesses on 30% of the land and open space/parks on the remaining 70% after years of litigation regarding a proposed Las Vegas-style casino proposed by the Guideville Band of Pomo Indians.

In the 2018 elections, the Richmond Progressive Alliance whose candidates form the left wing position on the council lost their supermajority. The other half of the council is typically made up of Richmond Chevron Refinery backed candidates, also Democrats, but more to the right. The reasons cited were Gayle McLaughlin and Jovanka Beckles running for statewide office and Ada Recinos falling to sixth place in the election. In 2019 the city council was mulling a ban on coal and petroleum coke storage that is frequently stored in boxcars along the industrial city's myriad train tracks off-gassing potential contaminants to the city's urban population possibly contributing to respiratory illnesses.

In 2019, the city was mulling (and expected to pass) banning coal storage in box cars and at its Levin Terminal giving the business 3 years to transition to alternate business practices whilst not banning the transport of coal through the city itself. It amounts to blocking 25% of the United States coal exports from the West Coast worldwide, mostly to China and other Asian countries. It was opposed by the coal and storage industries but supported by a petition of 600 residents citing health concerns from the 1 million tons of coal, nearly 268 thousand tons of petcoke and nearly 156 thousand tons of scrap metal shipped and stored in the city in 2018.

Also this year, the city fired its city manager by a vote of 4–3 Carlos Martinez citing "unfair labor practices" and the ire of the city's unions.

==== Ben Choi ====
Ben Choi has been the vice mayor and a city councilman of Richmond, California since 2019.

=== 2000s ===
The 2000s saw the rise and fall of pro-Chevron and anti-Chevron camps on the city council and the formation of the Richmond Progressive Alliance co-founded by Andres Soto. It was also the time during which Richmond was transformed from city with high gun violence and homicides to one with renewable energy and new schools built by a progressive Green Party mayor - Gayle McLaughlin who replaced Irma Anderson.

For the beginning of the decade the city council lineup was as follows: mayor Irma L. Anderson with vice mayor Jim Rogers and councilpersons Nathaniel Bates, Thomas K. Butt, Richard L. Griffin, John Márquez, Gayle McLaughlin, Mindell L. Penn, and María Viramontes.

During this decade the city managed to dig itself out of a 35 million US dollar deficit with crippling cuts to city services and 200 city job layoffs to a nearly 105 million US dollar renovation of the Richmond Civic Center.

2004 saw the city's council majority endorsement of a casino at Point Molate. In 2006 the city council voted to drop its membership in the Richmond City Council. Richmond was the first city in California to do so, and in the country second behind only Chicago. Mentioning the word "reparations", this story was picked up by the San Francisco Chronicle and carried in papers in Salt Lake City, Utah and Bluffton, South Carolina.

As part of the "Consent calendar" at the 1 March 2005 meeting, the city council adopted an ordinance, sponsored by Mindell Penn and María Viramontes, to divest city funds from financial institutions linked to slavery.

In 2009 the council was reduced in size from nine to seven seats in order to save the city salary costs.

==== Myrna López ====
From 2006 to 2010 Ludmyrna "Myrna" López was on the city council, she was criticized as a rubber stamp for Chevron and the developers such as the Point Molate Casino by Andrés Soto while she promoted jobs and education for the most part. She criticized the Richmond Progressive Alliance for not accepting corporate donations while not interfering with mass mailers sent out in opposition to Measure U an advisory ballot measure to approve of or disapprove of an Indian gaming casino at the former Point Molate Naval Fuel Depot.

==== Mindell Penn ====
Mindell Lewis Penn was a city council member in the city of Richmond, California between 1999 and 2005. is a graduate of the UC Davis Financial School of Management, and is affiliated with the "powerful" Bay Area group Black Women Organized For Political Action. She served on the Rosie the Riveter/World War II Home Front National Historical Park project committee. Mindell Penn was succeeded by Tony K. Thurmond, who was appointed upon her resignation.

==== John Márquez ====
John Márquez is an American Democratic politician and activist who has held various positions in Richmond, California city government over a span twenty-three years in addition to further years of service before and after in the West County Area. This includes eighteen years as a city councilman and a stint as vice mayor. He was the first Latino to serve on the Richmond City Council. Originally he was an appointee to the council in 1985 and won an election to that seat in 1987, he subsequently lost his second bid in 1991. However he was elected again in 1993 and twice more in 1997 and 2004. In 1990 and 1998 he also served as vice mayor. Márquez was defeated for re-election in 2008, and also lost a mayoral bid in 2001 to Green Gayle McLaughlin.

==== Jeff Ritterman ====
Jeff Ritterman is a cardiologist, politician, and activist from Richmond, California. He is currently vice president of the board of for the San Francisco Bay Area chapter of Physicians for Social Responsibility

From 1981 to 2010 he worked at Kaiser Permanente's Richmond Medical Center where he rose to the position of chief cardiologist. From 2008 to 2012 he was a city councilman for the Richmond City Council, where he proposed a soda tax ballot measure, to combat childhood diabetes, that eventually failed to pass.

==== Jim Rogers ====
Jim Rogers popularly known as "The People's Lawyer", was a city councilmember for the city of Richmond, California. He was first elected in 2002, and his final term expired in January 2015. He is a Democrat. From 1994 to 1998 he was a member of the board of supervisors of Contra Costa County, California.

==== Harpreet Sandhu ====
Harpreet Singh Sandhu is a Sikh American politician and community activist from Richmond, California and one of the most prominent ones of the Sikh religion. He was the first Asian and the first Sikh city councilman in Richmond, and one of only a few Sikhs to hold office in the United States. He lost reelection in 2008.

==== Tony Thurmond ====
Tony K. Thurmond is an American politician who is the 28th and current California State Superintendent of Public Instruction. Thurmond was narrowly elected Superintendent of Public Instruction in 2018 over his opponent, Marshall Tuck. He was the endorsed candidate of the California Democratic Party and all five 2018 California Teachers of the Year. A Democrat, he went on to represent the 15th Assembly District from 2014 to 2018.

==== María Viramontes ====
Maria Theresa Viramontes is an activist and former city councilwoman for Richmond, California's city council between 2001 and 2010.

In 2003 she voted against the Point Molate casino, however in 2010 she supported the project, that was later turned down by Richmond voters for the former naval fuel depot. In 2004 she again voted against a casino proposal by Upstream and its partner Harrah's.

In 2005 she proposed a measure with John Márquez to declare a state of emergency over the city's high crime rate which she compared to a "war zone" something opposed by then-mayor Irma Anderson citing that such situations involve the National Guard and suspending civil rights, ultimately her proposal was voted down. In 2006 she supported spending $US 30,000 on taxi script for low income residents.

Also in 2010 she was voted out along with Ludmyrna López and replaced by Corky Boozé and Jovanka Beckels – both of whom campaigned on anti-casino platforms and Boozé in particular was a vocal critic of Viramontes. Furthermore, that year she vehemently supported the preservation of the wild turkeys of Point Richmond, and also in the North & East neighborhood.

=== 1990s ===
==== Rosemary Corbin ====
Rosemary Corbin is a longstanding Democratic public figure and former mayor of Richmond, California.

Corbin served on the Richmond City Council from 1985 to 1993, and then as the mayor from 1993 to 2001. In 1993, Corbin defeated incumbent Richmond Mayor George Livingston, who was seeking re-election.

In 1998 the city's mining ordinance expired leaving the city's quarries and abandoned mines regulation up to the state, something councilman Tom Butt tried to ameliorate in 2006 with a new ordinance which caused conflicts with the city attorney John Eastman.

=== 1980s ===
==== John Ziesenhenne ====
He was a councilman from 1982 to 1993 and ran for mayor in 2010 unsuccessfully against Gayle McGlaughlin who won. He lives in the North & East District and is CEO of an insurance company. He supported the casino and hotel project at Point Molate.

==== George Livingston ====
George Livingston was an American politician who served as the first elected African American mayor of Richmond, California, from 1985 to 1993. Livingston was appointed Mayor in 1985 by the city council. He won election as Richmond's first elected African American mayor in 1989 for a full term.

=== 1960s ===
==== George Carroll ====
George Carroll was an American lawyer who was an important civic figure in Contra Costa County, California and the city of Richmond.

He was the first black lawyer in Richmond, California. In 1961 Carroll became the first African American elected to the city council (1961–1964) and later became the first black mayor of Richmond (1964–65) or any large American city. Afterwards George Carroll became the first black judge in Contra Costa when he was appointed to the Bay Municipal Court by Governor Pat Brown in 1965.

==== Nathaniel Bates ====
Nathaniel Bates is a former mayor and seven-term city councilmember of Richmond, California.

Bates was a city councilmember from 1967 to 1983 and again from 1995 to the present. He was chosen as mayor for 1971–72 (during which time he was the first African-American to chair the Contra Costa Mayors Conference) and again for 1976–77. He was the third African-American mayor of Richmond after George B. Carroll. His seven terms on the city council are unprecedented in the city of Richmond, and his 32 years of service make him one of the longest-serving city councilmembers in the state. He is a Democrat.
