= Tewksbury =

Tewksbury may refer to:

== Places ==
- Tewksbury, Massachusetts, US
- Tewksbury Township, New Jersey, US
- Tewksbury Heights, Contra Costa County, California, US

== Other uses ==
- Tewksbury (surname)
- 12855 Tewksbury, main-belt asteroid

== See also ==
- Tewkesbury, Gloucestershire, England
  - Tewkesbury (UK Parliament constituency)
  - Borough of Tewkesbury
- Battle of Tewkesbury (1471)
