= Rollingwood =

Rollingwood may refer to:

- Rollingwood, California
- Rollingwood, Texas
