= Doctors Medical Center San Pablo Campus =

Coordinates: 37°57′12″N 122°20′11″W

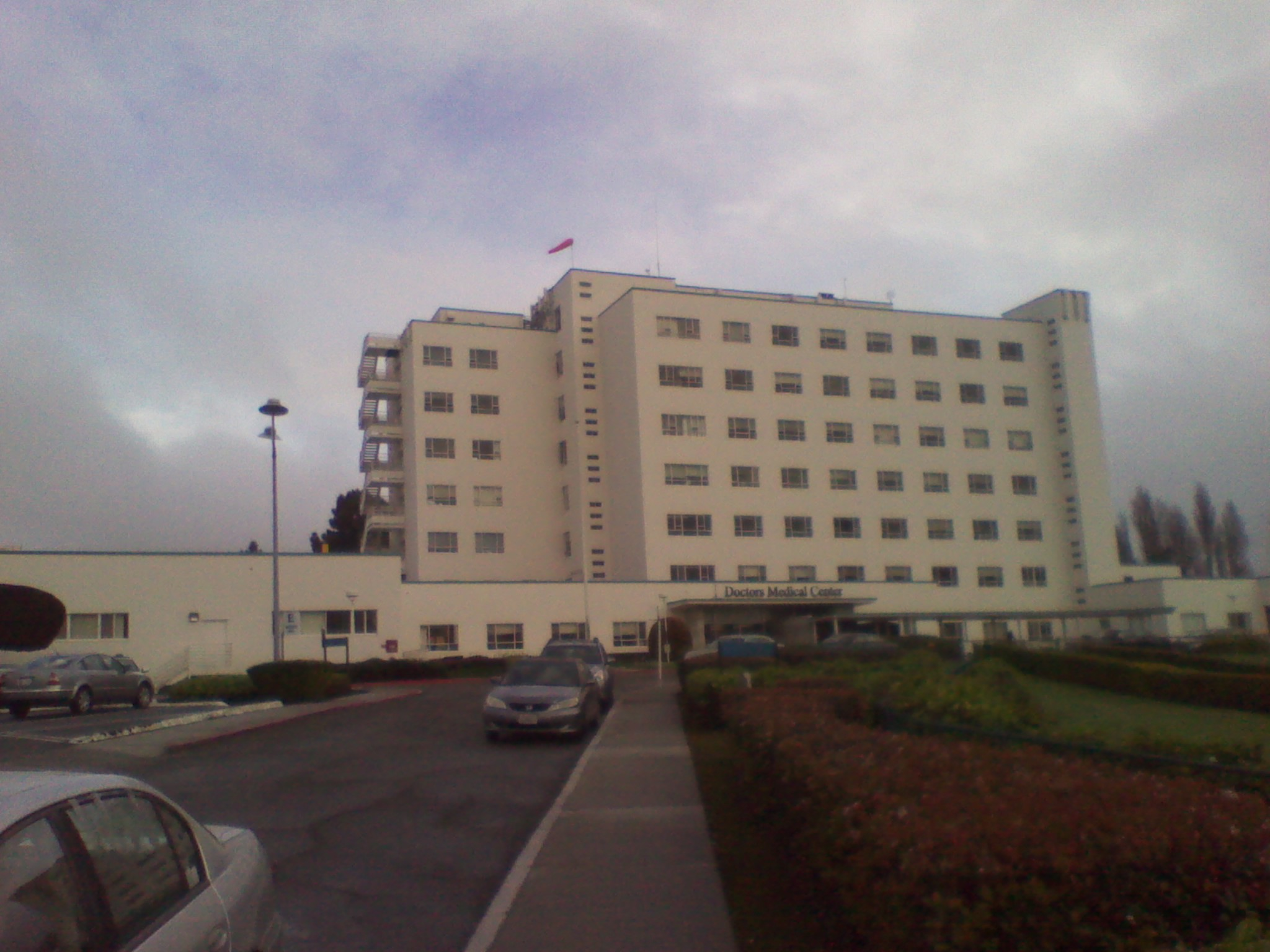
- Hospital (From Vale Road)

Geography
- Location: 2000 Vale Road, San Pablo, California, United States

History
- Founded: 1954
- Closed: 2015

Links
- Website: Archive of website
- Lists: Hospitals in California

Doctors Medical Center (originally Brookside Hospital) was an eight-story, 120-bed public hospital in San Pablo, California which served 250,000 residents in western Contra Costa County from 1954 to 2015.

== History ==
In 1948, the residents voted to create the West Contra Costa Hospital District, one of the Health care districts in California, for the purpose of building Brookside Hospital. The five-story, 165-bed hospital cost $4 million and 3 years to construct, and opened its doors in 1954. The district (renamed the West Contra Costa Healthcare District in 1994) operated Brookside until 1997, when it affiliated with Tenet Healthcare to administer the hospital, which Tenet renamed Doctors Medical Center. In January 2004, Tenet announced that it would not be renewing the leasing arrangement, and the district resumed administration of the hospital on July 31, 2004, until its closure in April 2015.

=== Financial woes ===
The hospital was bailed out through several state loan, county funding, and ballot measure schemes throughout the 2000s. The hospital also struggled to secure funding necessary to retrofit and modernize to meet the state's strict earthquake proofing building standards.

In 2006 the Contra Costa County Board of Supervisors approved $20 million to the hospital. This deal came with the condition of heightened county scrutiny over the medical center's bookkeeping. Half of the funding came from the county's emergency reserves and half from county administered federal Medicaid funds, and it permitted the center to continue ambulance services.

In 2011, a ballot measure was approved by 74% of the voters to assess $47 per parcel annually as long as the facility remained open, and was projected to raise $5 million annually. SFGATE reported that the hospital "had already cut its budget to the bone", discontinued obstetrics, and that 80% of its patients were on Medi-Cal, and 10% had no insurance at all.

Also in September 2011 Richmond mayor Gayle McLaughlin along with area state senator Loni Hancock and the mayors of Hercules, Pinole, and El Cerrito lobbied governor Jerry Brown for loan guarantees, which were approved on October 9.

In March 2015, the West County Health District Board voted to close the hospital and sell the property. The estimated $7.5 million from the sale would satisfy employee, physician, and vendor liabilities. The hospital closed on April 21, 2015. The hospital was sold to the Lytton Band of Pomo Indians in 2017, demolished, and replaced with parking lots for the adjacent San Pablo Lytton Casino.

== Facilities ==
In 2005, Doctors Medical Center employed 1,100 people and was the primary radiation and cardiac center in the area. It also provided cancer treatment, obstetrics (until 2006), and burn care. At the time, it offered the only full service emergency room in west Contra Costa County, receiving 41,000 patients annually, so its financial instability was of significant public interest.

The site, when open, was accessible by AC Transit bus lines that connected it with local BART and Amtrak stations. It had a heliport in front of the main entrance.
