= San Pablo Peninsula =

Peninsula in western Richmond, California

Coordinates: 37°56′09″N 122°20′52″W

San Pablo Peninsula is a peninsula in western Richmond, between San Pablo Bay and San Rafael Bay, in southwestern Contra Costa County, California.

== Geography ==
The peninsula runs between Castro Cove and Point San Pablo, and is dominated by the steep ridges of the Potrero Hills, an escarpment that runs along the entire peninsula.

The peninsula is largely owned by Chevron and is used as a safety buffer for security purposes (see Chevron Richmond Refinery).

=== Features ===
Features located on San Pablo Peninsula include:

- Point Molate Beach Park
- Point Molate Regional Shoreline
- Point Molate Marsh
- Point San Pablo
- Point San Pablo Yacht Harbor
- Winehaven
