= West Contra Costa Unified School District =

School district in California

Location
- Richmond, California (encompassing Western Contra Costa County) United States

District information
- Type: Public
- Grades: K-12, Alternative Education, Adult Education
- Established: July 1, 1965
- Superintendent: Cheryl Cotton
- Budget: Revenue: $338,673,000; Expenditures: $425,711,000

Students and staff
- Students: 32,197

Other information
- Website: www.wccusd.net

The West Contra Costa Unified School District (WCCUSD; formerly known as Richmond School District) is the school district for western Contra Costa County, California. It is based in Richmond, California. In addition to Richmond, the district covers the cities of El Cerrito, San Pablo, Pinole, and Hercules, and the unincorporated areas of Bayview, East Richmond Heights, El Sobrante, Kensington, Montalvin Manor, North Richmond, and Tara Hills.

== History ==
The district currently has six neighborhood-assignment high schools, six neighborhood-assignment middle schools, and thirty-six neighborhood-assignment elementary and primary schools along with various continuation and alternative schools. The district website offers a graphical interactive tool for figuring out the boundaries and locations for neighborhood-assignment schools.

The WCCUSD incurred $42.5 million in debt when the then-named Richmond Unified School District went bankrupt in 1990 under Superintendent Walter Marks and the state, under court order, financed district operations. The bankruptcy affected the credit rating of the City of Richmond, therefore the name was changed. In 1991 the district had to be bailed out by the state. As of Fall 2005, the school district is $7 million in debt. The district has been lobbying IBM to forgive 5 million dollars in debt from obsolete computers purchased in 1989. To decrease expenditures, the district planned to close schools over the following two years.

== Boundary ==
The district includes, in addition to Richmond: Bayview, East Richmond Heights, El Cerrito, El Sobrante, Kensington, Montalvin Manor, North Richmond, Pinole, Rollingwood, San Pablo, and Tara Hills. It also includes the majority of Hercules.

== ACLU lawsuit ==
In 2012, the American Civil Liberties Union sued the district for the "decrepit" conditions at Community Day School. The alternative school was reported to have no electricity, heating, or bathrooms in addition to rampant rodent and feline excrement. Furthermore, the roof was leaking, there were insufficient seats or desks for students and mushrooms were found to be growing from the floor. Two-thirds of students were also reported as being chronically truant. It was also noted that there was not usually a math or science teacher available. Students needing to use a bathroom facility needed to be escorted by staff to Gompers Continuation High School. The stated goal of the suit was to improve the learning conditions and available supplies and opportunities for the small school body.

== High schools ==
- De Anza High School (Richmond)
- El Cerrito High School (El Cerrito)
- Hercules Middle/High School (Hercules)
- John F. Kennedy High School (Richmond)
- Pinole Valley High School (Pinole)
- Richmond High School
- Middle College High School (within the campus of Contra Costa College in San Pablo)

=== Charters ===
- Leadership Public Schools (Richmond)

=== Continuation schools ===
- Greenwood Academy
- Transition Program Vista Hills
- Vista High
- Serra
- Alvarado

== Middle schools ==
- Adams Middle School (closed, effective 2009–2010 year)
- Betty Reid Soskin Middle School; formerly named Juan Crespi Middle School after Juan Crespí
- Helms Middle School
- Hercules Middle/High School
- Fred T. Korematsu Middle School (formerly named Portola Middle School)
- Lovonya DeJean Middle School
- Pinole Middle School

=== Charters ===
- Manzanita Charter Middle School
- Summit K2

== K-8 schools ==
- Elizabeth Stewart School
- West County Mandarin School

== Elementary schools ==
- Alvarado Elementary School (closed 1987, currently Adult Education Alvarado Campus)
- Balboa Elementary School (closed 1989, currently Balboa Child Development Center)
- Bayview Elementary School
- Cameron School
- Castro Elementary School (closed effective 2009–2010 year—now site of completely new building for Fred T. Korematsu Middle School)
- César E. Chávez Elementary School
- Margaret Collins Elementary School
- Coronado Elementary School
- Del Mar Elementary School (closed 1987)
- Dover Elementary School
- El Monte Elementary School (open 1954, closed 1989)
- El Portal Elementary School (closed 1990)
- El Sobrante Elementary School (closed effective 2009–2010 year)
- Frances L. Ellerhorst Elementary School
- Fairmont Elementary School
- Jeston O. Ford International MicroSociety School
- Grant Elementary School
- Hanna Ranch Elementary School
- Harbour Way Academy
- Harding Elementary School
- Highland Elementary School
- Kensington Hilltop Elementary School
- Martin Luther King Jr. Elementary School (originally Pullman School)
- Lake Elementary School
- Lincoln Elementary School
- Lupine Hills Elementary School (formerly Hercules Elementary School)
- Madera Elementary School
- Mira Vista Elementary School (K-8)
- Montalvin Manor Elementary School
- Murphy Elementary School
- Nystrom Magnet Elementary School
- Michelle Obama Elementary School (formerly Woodrow Wilson Elementary School)
- Ohlone Elementary School
- Olinda Elementary School
- John Peres Elementary School
- Riverside Elementary School
- Seaview Elementary School (closed, Fall 2005)
- Shannon Elementary School
- Sheldon Elementary School
- Richard Stege Elementary School
- Tara Hills Elementary School
- Transgender Learning Center
- Valley View Elementary School
- Verde Elementary School
- Washington Elementary School

=== Charters ===
- Richmond College Prep Schools (Preschool and K–6)
