= Lytton Indian Band =

Lytton Indian Band may refer to:

- Lytton Band of Pomo Indians (California)
- Lytton First Nation (British Columbia)
