= Point Potrero Pond =

Lake in the state of California, United States

Potrero Hills Pond
- Location within California Location within the United States
- Location: Point Molate, Richmond, California
- Coordinates: 37°56′03″N 122°24′09″W
- Primary inflows: unnamed spring
- Basin countries: United States

Potrero Hills Pond is a small lake in Richmond, California. It was formed from quarrying of hills near Potrero Hills at the Blake Brothers Quarry. It is fed by underground springs. It is now polluted and surrounded by a Chevron Richmond Refinery tank farm.

== See also ==
- List of lakes in California
- List of lakes in the San Francisco Bay Area
