= Hercules Middle/High School =

Public school in Hercules, United States

Hercules High School
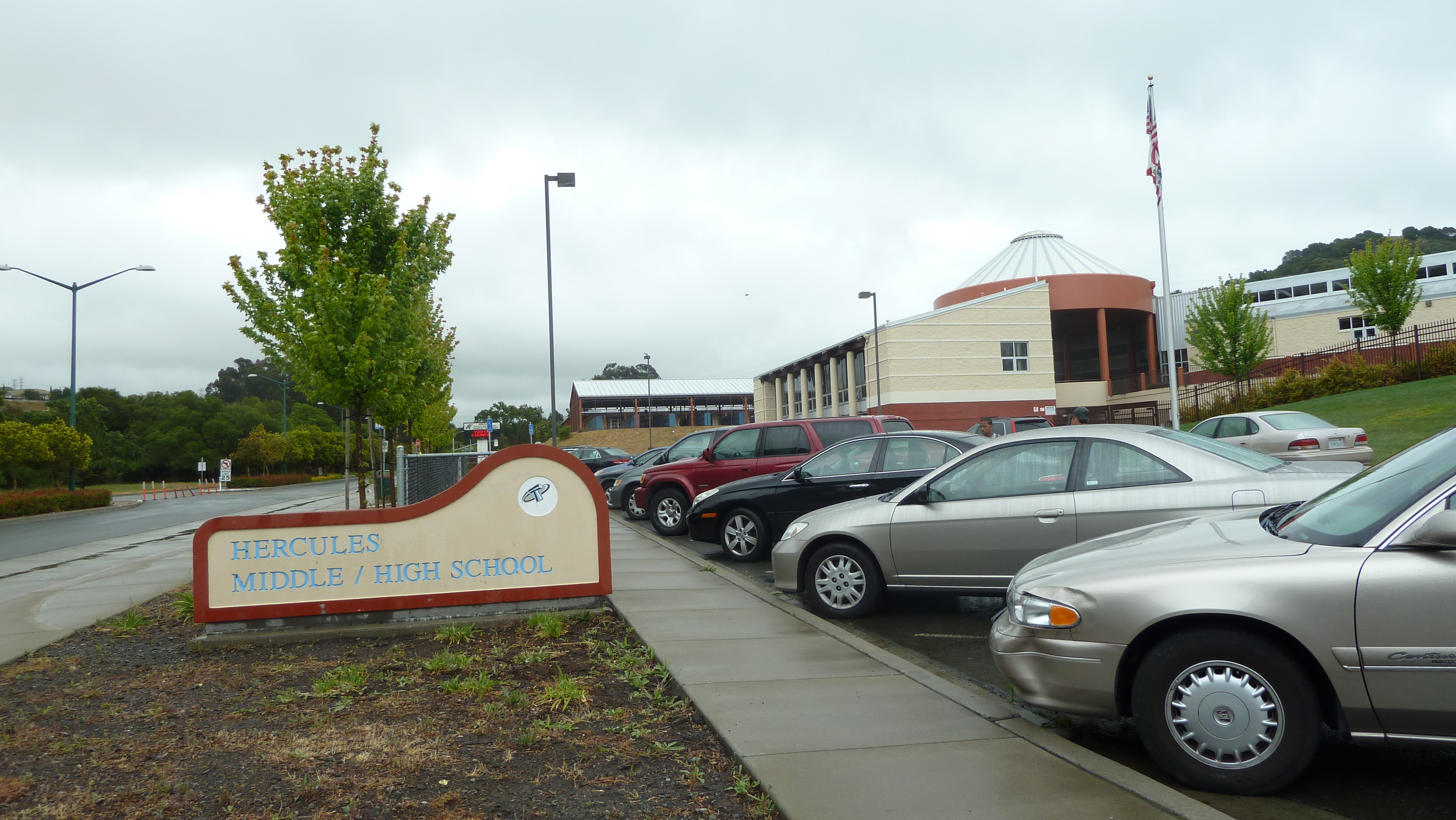

Location
- 1900 Refugio Valley Road; Hercules, California 94547; United States; 37.99901°N 122.25134°W

Information
- Type: Public
- Established: 2001
- School district: West Contra Costa Unified School District
- CEEB code: 51206
- Principal: Ryan Timothy Shaw / Rocquel Colbert
- Staff: 32.48 (FTE)
- Grades: 9-12
- Enrollment: 740 (2023–2024)
- Student to teacher ratio: 22.78
- Colors: Black, Columbia blue, and silver
- Mascot: Titan
- Publication: linktr.ee/herctitantribune
- Newspaper: Titan Tribune
- Yearbook: The Olympus
- Website: herculeshigh.wccusd.net

Hercules High School is a secondary school located at 1900 Refugio Valley Road in Hercules, California, United States. The campus consists of both a middle school and high school on the same premises, with the administrative complex and library separating the two sides. It was established in 2001 as a 6-12 school. In July 2014, the West Contra Costa Board of Trustees approved the split of the middle and high schools as two separate schools. It is a part of the West Contra Costa Unified School District.

== Demographics ==
As of 2010, the Hercules High School student population was 45.2% Asian/Pacific Islander, 25.0% Black, 14.9% Hispanic, 9.9% White, and 0.3% American Indian. 25% were considered economically disadvantaged, participating in a free or reduced-price lunch program, and 9% were English language learners.

== Publications ==
- Hercules High School's newspaper is the Titan Template. In 2009, it won an "excellent" in JEANC's Best of the West.
- Hercules High School also has a fledgling online newspaper, ArkeNews. It is so named because Arke was the messenger of the Titans in mythology.
- Hercules Middle School's newspaper is the Titan Times
- Hercules High School's award-winning yearbook is The Olympus.
- The school also has a creative literary magazine, The Dynamite Factory. It is published by the Creative Writing class
- The school paper later changed its name to the Titan Tribune, following a refresh after remaining inactive for several years. It was reinitiated in 2021.

== Athletics ==
Hercules High School competes in the Tri-County Athletic League (TCAL) of the North Coast Section (NCS).

Basketball is the only sport available on the middle school side. However for the high school students there is badminton, football, cross country, tennis, golf, water polo, cheer, soccer, basketball, softball, baseball, volleyball, swimming, and track.
