= Mindell Penn =

American politician and activist

Mindell Lewis Penn
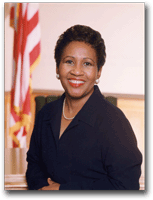

Richmond City Council
- In office 1999–2005

Personal details
- Born: 1944 or 1945 (age 81–82) Detroit, Michigan

Mindell Lewis Penn (born 1944/1945) is an American politician from Richmond, California. She served on the Richmond City Council from 1999 and 2005. She is a graduate of the UC Davis Financial School of Management, and is affiliated with the "powerful" Bay Area group Black Women Organized For Political Action. She was an executive for PG&E working in community relations and finance, and was elected twice as the chairwoman of the Sacramento Urban League board of directors. She served on the Rosie the Riveter/World War II Home Front National Historical Park project committee.

== Career overview ==
=== Richmond City Council, 1999 ===
Mindell Penn was first elected to the city council in 1999. This election occurred during a time when Richmond city leaders were under investigation by the FBI for political corruption. Penn ran a campaign with the slogan, "My vote will never be for sale." She was backed by two local political action committees, the Black American Political Action Committee and West County United. Among the list of twelve candidates, with five winning seats, Penn topped the polling. According to the San Francisco Chronicle, Penn stated, "I ran a clean campaign, and I don't have hidden agendas...People are tired of dirty politics, and it showed."

=== Richmond City Council, 2004 ===
In the November 2004 election, where the top five candidates out of fifteen running were elected, she finished fourth. She ran with campaign goals to "make Richmond a clean, safe and beautiful destination waterfront city" and also to "restore" services for seniors and youth. Penn spent $20,000 on her campaign. At the 1 March 2005 meeting, the city council adopted without objection an ordinance, sponsored by Mindell Penn and María Viramontes, to divest city funds from financial institutions linked to slavery. Richmond was the first city in California to do so, and in the country second behind only Chicago. Mentioning the word "reparations", this story was picked up by the San Francisco Chronicle and carried in papers in Salt Lake City, and Bluffton, South Carolina. Penn received attention in April 2005 for plans, based on fatalities in Detroit, to improve the city's rental home inspection program. Detroit was again mentioned two months later when Penn resigned, six months into her second term, citing a desire to move to Detroit to live with her elderly mother.

== See also ==
- Richmond, California City Council
