= Bayview-Montalvin, California =

- former CDP
- Location in Contra Costa County and the state of California
- Coordinates: 38°0′3″N 122°19′31″W
- Country: United States
- State: California
- County: Contra Costa

Area
  - Total: 0.8 sq mi (2.1 km^{2})
  - Land: 0.6 sq mi (1.6 km^{2})
  - Water: 0.2 sq mi (0.52 km^{2})

Population (2000)
  - Total: 5,004
  - Density: 8,300/sq mi (3,200/km^{2})

Bayview-Montalvin is a former census-designated place (CDP) in Contra Costa County, California, United States. The population was 5,004 at the 2000 census.

Prior to the 2010 census, the CDP was dissolved into Bayview CDP and Montalvin Manor CDP.

== Geography ==
According to the United States Census Bureau, the CDP had a total area of 0.8 square miles (2.1 km^{2}), of which 0.6 square miles (1.6 km^{2}) was land and 0.2 square miles (0.52 km^{2}) (23.17%) was water.

== Demographics ==
Historical population
Census	Pop.	Note	%±
1990	3,988		—
2000	5,004		25.5%
U.S. Decennial Census; 1860–1870 1880-1890; 1900 1910 1920; 1930 1940 1950; 1960 1970 1980; 1990 2000 2010

Bayview-Montalvin first appeared as a census designated place in the 1990 U.S. census; the CDP was deleted after being split into the Bayview CDP and the Montalvin Manor CDP; and part annexed to the city of Pinole prior to the 2010 U.S. Census.

As of the census of 2000, there were 5,004 people, 1,461 households, and 1,164 families living in the CDP. The population density was 7,845.0 inhabitants per square mile (3,029.0/km^{2}). There were 1,476 housing units at an average density of 2,314.0 per square mile (893.4/km^{2}). The racial makeup of the CDP was 47.72% White, 11.97% Black or African American, 1.10% Native American, 13.89% Asian, 0.76% Pacific Islander, 19.24% from other races, and 5.32% from two or more races. 35.19% of the population were Hispanic or Latino of any race.

There were 1,461 households, out of which 38.1% had children under the age of 18 living with them, 58.7% were married couples living together, 14.5% had a female householder with no husband present, and 20.3% were non-families. 16.6% of all households were made up of individuals, and 8.7% had someone living alone who was 65 years of age or older. The average household size was 3.42 and the average family size was 3.78.

In the CDP, the population was spread out, with 28.9% under the age of 18, 9.1% from 18 to 24, 28.4% from 25 to 44, 22.2% from 45 to 64, and 11.3% who were 65 years of age or older. The median age was 34 years. For every 100 females, there were 96.2 males. For every 100 females age 18 and over, there were 93.4 males.

The median income for a household in the CDP was $50,750, and the median income for a family was $53,315. Males had a median income of $43,750 versus $30,318 for females. The per capita income for the CDP was $16,056. About 7.8% of families and 11.7% of the population were below the poverty line, including 11.1% of those under age 18 and 7.9% of those age 65 or over.
