= Montalvin Manor, California =

Montalvin Manor Montalvin
- Census-designated place
- Location in California
- Coordinates: 37°59′44″N 122°19′58″W
- Country: United States
- State: California
- County: Contra Costa

Government
  - County Board: District 1: John Gioia

Area
  - Total: 0.322 sq mi (0.833 km^{2})
  - Land: 0.322 sq mi (0.833 km^{2})
  - Water: 0 sq mi (0 km^{2}) 0%
- Elevation: 69 ft (21 m)

Population (2020)
  - Total: 3,099
  - Density: 9,640/sq mi (3,720/km^{2})
- Time zone: UTC-8 (Pacific (PST))
  - Summer (DST): UTC-7 (PDT)
- GNIS feature IDs: 1701553; 2583085

Montalvin Manor (formerly, Montalvin) is a census-designated place (CDP) in Contra Costa County, California, United States. At the 2020 census, its population was 3,099. It lies at an elevation of 69 feet (21 m). For census purposes, it formed part of Bayview-Montalvin until 2010, when it became a separate CDP. The other half of the old CDP became Bayview.

Despite its location outside San Pablo city limits, Montalvin Manor uses San Pablo mailing addresses.

== Demographics ==
Historical population
Census	Pop.	Note	%±
2010	2,876		—
2020	3,099		7.8%
U.S. Decennial Census; 2010

=== 2020 census ===
As of the 2020 census, Montalvin Manor had a population of 3,099 and a population density of 9,654.2 inhabitants per square mile (3,727.5/km^{2}).

Racial composition as of the 2020 census
Race	Number	Percent
White	611	19.7%
Black or African American	197	6.4%
American Indian and Alaska Native	83	2.7%
Asian	344	11.1%
Native Hawaiian and Other Pacific Islander	6	0.2%
Some other race	1,460	47.1%
Two or more races	398	12.8%
Hispanic or Latino (of any race)	2,024	65.3%

The census reported that 99.5% of the population lived in households, 0.5% lived in non-institutionalized group quarters, and no one was institutionalized. 100.0% of residents lived in urban areas, while 0.0% lived in rural areas.

There were 888 households, out of which 37.6% included children under the age of 18, 49.9% were married-couple households, 4.6% were cohabiting couple households, 31.0% had a female householder with no spouse or partner present, and 14.5% had a male householder with no spouse or partner present. 22.3% of households were one person, and 17.3% were one person aged 65 or older. The average household size was 3.47, and there were 649 families (73.1% of all households).

The age distribution was 22.1% under the age of 18, 10.4% aged 18 to 24, 25.2% aged 25 to 44, 26.1% aged 45 to 64, and 16.2% who were 65 years of age or older. The median age was 38.3 years. For every 100 females, there were 97.8 males, and for every 100 females age 18 and over there were 94.5 males age 18 and over.

There were 916 housing units at an average density of 2,853.6 units per square mile (1,101.8 units/km^{2}), of which 888 (96.9%) were occupied. Of these, 73.8% were owner-occupied, and 26.2% were occupied by renters. The vacancy rate was 3.1%, including a homeowner vacancy rate of 1.2% and a rental vacancy rate of 3.7%.

=== 2010 census ===
Montalvin Manor first appeared as a census designated place in the 2010 U.S. census after the Bayview-Montalvin CDP was split into the Bayview CDP and Montalvin Manor CDP with additional area from the Tara Hills CDP.

== Education ==
It is in the West Contra Costa Unified School District.
