= Point Molate Beach Park =

Park in Richmond, California, U.S.

Coordinates: 37.942086°N 122.410488°W

Point Molate Beach Park is a city-owned park in Richmond, California, accessible only via a narrow road from the Richmond-San Rafael Bridge toll plaza exit "Western Drive", and separate from the rest of the city. The park is adjacent to the present day ghost town of Winehaven.

== History ==
The Beach Park - originally part of the Point Molate Naval Fuel Depot - was leased to the City of Richmond in the early 1970s for $1.00/month and developed by the Navy as a gesture of goodwill to local residents and to provide recreation for the Navy and their families stationed at Pt. Molate. Subsequent budget concerns and cleanup needs led to a complete closure of the park in 2001.

The park reopened in April 2014 after another round of cleanup.

The East Bay Regional Parks District has planned including the park and the Point Molate area in general as part of a new park in its long-term projects.

== See also ==
- Point Molate Naval Fuel Depot
- Winehaven, California
- Point San Pablo District
