= San Pablo Fault =

The San Pablo Fault is a fault in northern California. It is an offshoot of the Hayward Fault. It formed the Potrero Hills in Richmond, California.
