= Potrero Hills (Richmond, California) =

- Potrero Ridge, Point Molate Hills
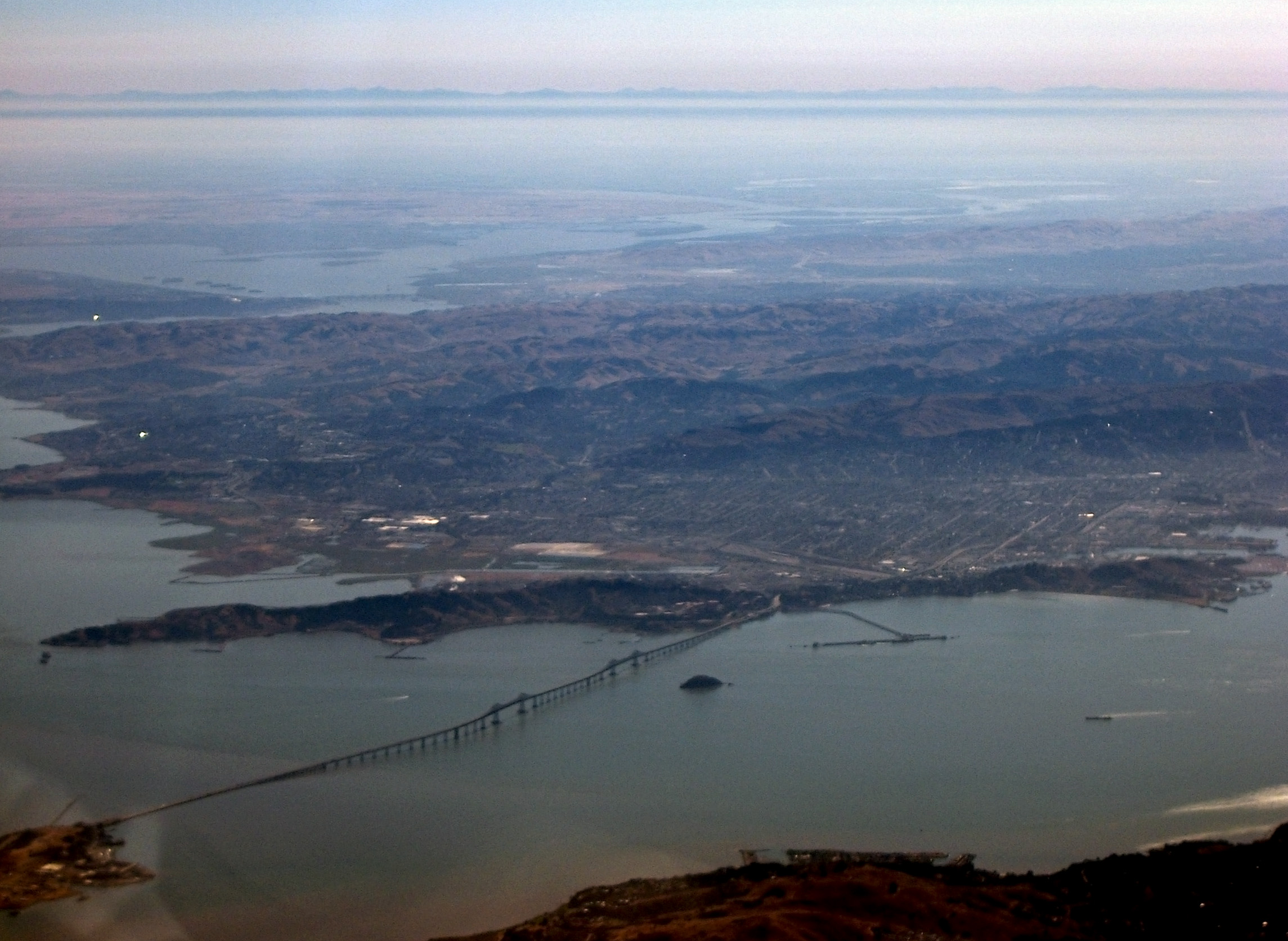
- Potrero Hills refers to the hills forming the western shore to the left and right of the bridge.

Highest point
- Peak: Unnamed
- Elevation: 494 ft (151 m)

Geography
- Country: United States
- Region: Point Molate, Richmond, California
- Range coordinates: 37°57′05″N 122°24′33″W
- Parent range: Berkeley Hills

Geology
- Rock ages: Precambrian and Cretaceous
- Rock type(s): shale, sandstone, chert

The Potrero Hills also known as the Potrero Ridge and Point Molate Hills is a chaparral and forested escarpment that crests northwest to southeast along the San Pablo Peninsula in Richmond, California.

== History ==
The steep hills crest from Point Richmond in the south to Point San Pablo in the north. They were formed by pressure created by the San Pablo Fault a sub-fault of the Hayward Fault. Part of the hills once were cultivated as a vineyard for the Winehaven Winery, world's largest winery at the time. The range hosts two peaks the largest is a 494-feet (151 m) and the second largest a 328 feet (100 m) peak, both are unnamed. The hills once formed the backbone of an island the existed off the coast of what is now central Richmond and has been landfilled, similar to Alameda's Bay Farm Island. The hills are made of shale, sandstone, and chert.

== Industry ==
The hills provide a natural barrier protecting the Point Molate area from ammonia and other contaminants that could be released from the Chevron Richmond Refinery in the event of a disaster. A pass is carved into it at its southern end for Interstate 580. Some of the ridge was also formerly used for goat grazing and quarrying at the Blake Brothers Quarry. A weather station sits atop a peak overlooking Point San Pablo. Point Potrero Pond is a small lake near the Richmond–San Rafael Bridge toll plaza near the south of the hills. The hills are dotted with tank farms and polluted sites from the former Point Molate Naval Fuel Depot. The hills vegetation is largely composed of eucalyptus woodlands, chaparral, grasslands with some wetlands as well.
