= Tewksbury (surname) =

Tewksbury is a surname, derived from the town of Tewkesbury in Gloucestershire. Notable people with the surname include:

- Bob Tewksbury (born 1960), American baseball pitcher
- Mark Tewksbury (born 1968), Canadian swimmer
- Peter Tewksbury (1923–2003), American filmmaker
- Walter Tewksbury (1876–1968), American athlete
