= North Richmond, California =

North Richmond
- Census-designated place
- Location in California
- Coordinates: 37°57′32″N 122°22′03″W
- Country: United States
- State: California
- County: Contra Costa

Government
  - County Board: District 1: John Gioia
  - State Senate: Jesse Arreguín (D)
  - State Assembly: Buffy Wicks (D)
  - U. S. Congress: John Garamendi (D)

Area
  - Total: 1.549 sq mi (4.01 km^{2})
  - Land: 1.390 sq mi (3.60 km^{2})
  - Water: 0.159 sq mi (0.41 km^{2}) 10.3%
- Elevation: 16 ft (4.9 m)

Population (2020)
  - Total: 4,175
  - Density: 3,004/sq mi (1,160/km^{2})
- Time zone: UTC-8 (PST)
  - Summer (DST): UTC-7 (PDT)
- ZIP code: 94801
- Area codes: 510, 341
- GNIS feature IDs: 1659249, 2583096

North Richmond is an unincorporated area in Contra Costa County, California, United States, a census-designated place (CDP) with a population of 4,175 as of the 2020 census, adjacent to and nearly surrounded by the city of Richmond.

== History ==
The area of North Richmond was populated by Ohlone tribes which settled the area in the 6th century. However, Hokan speaking people may have inhabited the area even earlier, and archaeological evidence shows human settlement to have begun at least by 4000 BC. The Ohlone tribesmen subsisted from hunter-gathering the bountiful amount of land and sea life of the area. Especially the great amounts of seafood made available along the coastline of Castro Cove and the surrounding marshlands and delta of Wildcat and San Pablo creeks. The majority of present-day North Richmond was territory of the Karkin tribe (or Carquinez) however the land lies on what was a border area with the Chocheño tribe and likely had influences of both groups. The tribes made great use of the salmon and trout runs on the rivers. However, today, culverting and damming has decimated the habitat for these species and they are rarely present ever at the opening of the watercourse.

In the early part of the 20th century, North Richmond was populated by Italian-Americans. During World War II, many African Americans moved from the South and Midwest and came to the Western United States in order to find jobs contributing to the war effort. Many came to work in Richmond's shipyards and consequently, moved into North Richmond.

Subsequently many of the residents were employed in the petroleum, railway, and shipping industries.

== Demographics ==
Historical population
Census	Pop.	Note	%±
2010	3,717		—
2020	4,175		12.3%
U.S. Decennial Census; 2010

North Richmond first appeared as a census designated place in the 2010 U.S. census.

=== 2020 census ===
As of the 2020 census, North Richmond had a population of 4,175. The population density was 3,003.6 inhabitants per square mile (1,159.7/km^{2}). 100.0% of residents lived in urban areas, while 0.0% lived in rural areas.

The census reported that 99.8% of the population lived in households, 0.2% lived in non-institutionalized group quarters, and no one was institutionalized. There were 1,082 households, out of which 50.8% included children under the age of 18, 44.7% were married-couple households, 8.1% were cohabiting couple households, 29.9% had a female householder with no spouse or partner present, and 17.3% had a male householder with no spouse or partner present. 15.8% of households were one person, and 7.1% were one person aged 65 or older. The average household size was 3.85. There were 850 families (78.6% of all households).

The age distribution was 28.2% under the age of 18, 11.0% aged 18 to 24, 31.8% aged 25 to 44, 21.1% aged 45 to 64, and 7.9% who were 65 years of age or older. The median age was 31.6 years. For every 100 females, there were 101.8 males, and for every 100 females age 18 and over there were 100.6 males age 18 and over.

There were 1,167 housing units at an average density of 839.6 units per square mile (324.2 units/km^{2}), of which 1,082 (92.7%) were occupied. Of these, 48.5% were owner-occupied, and 51.5% were occupied by renters. The remaining 7.3% of housing units were vacant. The homeowner vacancy rate was 1.3% and the rental vacancy rate was 1.8%.

Racial composition as of the 2020 census
Race	Number	Percent
White	302	7.2%
Black or African American	697	16.7%
American Indian and Alaska Native	118	2.8%
Asian	385	9.2%
Native Hawaiian and Other Pacific Islander	31	0.7%
Some other race	2,054	49.2%
Two or more races	588	14.1%
Hispanic or Latino (of any race)	2,833	67.9%

== Government ==
The West Contra Costa Housing Authority of Contra Costa County is located in North Richmond. The area is policed by the Contra Costa County Sheriff's department. The community is governed by the county of Contra Costa and the current representative is supervisor John Gioia.

At a community level the town does not have a city council or its own neighborhood councils. North Richmond does, though, have a community council that represents the resident's voices at the county level, known as the North Richmond Municipal Advisory Council.

Richmond has considered annexing North Richmond several times since the 1960s. In fall 2011, the neighboring city of San Pablo conducted a telephone opinion poll of San Pablo residents. Among other items, the poll sought to assess San Pablo citizens' opinions on the possibility of the City of San Pablo annexing unincorporated North Richmond. Reasons cited included the opportunity for North Richmond residents to have direct representation and also give San Pablo waterfront access to San Pablo Bay.

== Recreation ==
Sports such as baseball and basketball are common in the neighborhood, especially for young men. Baseball has been a long tradition in the area for decades, with residents frequently playing at the North Richmond Ballfield Complex and at Shields-Reid Park. The Bay Area's Hyphy scene is popular among many young people who aspire to be rappers and singers. Hip hop, Rap, and R&B music, as with many areas densely populated by African Americans, is prominent among the area's youth.

== Transportation ==
This area is served by AC Transit bus lines 76, 71, and 376, that connect the community with Richmond BART & Amtrak station, Contra Costa College in San Pablo, and Hilltop Mall in addition to other areas of west county. The line 376 is an owl service, and due to several assaults and other crimes committed on board during 2010 the bus is now escorted by a county sheriff's vehicle while inside town limits. In fact, many bus drivers refuse to work this line because of how dangerous it can be. Richmond Parkway, a connector between I-580 at Point Richmond and I-80 at the Hilltop area, runs through the west of North Richmond.

== Crime ==
The area has one of the highest per-capita homicide rates in the nation. Coupled with the highest homicide rate, citizens have complained that law enforcement is ineffective in dealing with shootings in their community and that killers are almost never brought to justice.

== Environment ==
North Richmond is next to Chevron Richmond Refinery in Richmond's Point Richmond District. The public health risks associated with emissions and chemical spills, especially of sulfur trioxide, are major concerns for the entire area. A community warning system of loud sirens is in place to warn residents of chemical spills. This warning is tested on the first Wednesday of every month, and can be heard from miles away. The Richmond dump is also in a tiny strip of Richmond that runs through North Richmond.

The landfill pays into a mitigation fund used for community projects to offset how blight and pollution impact the town. In 2011 $56,000 were granted out of a $100,000 budget to building community gardens on vacant lots leased to the volunteer effort. The project aims to provide education and training for the cultivation and eating of healthful vegetables. Although the gardens will provide otherwise unavailable produce, North Richmonders still have to go to San Pablo or Richmond areas for groceries.

== Economy ==
North Richmond has an extensive industrial history. Today, an important industry in this town is Action Recycling, which purchases bulk scrap metal in addition to more traditional plastics, bottles, cans, and cardboard from patrons. The community is home to many farms and greenhouses; thousands of flowers both within and surrounding these greenhouses can be seen from the Richmond Parkway.

There are very few commercial businesses in the town but there are two small grocers and a liquor store remaining.

A Native American tribe, the Scotts Valley Band of Pomo Indians of Lake County, has proposed and received approval for Sugar Bowl Casino on a 28-acre (≈11 hectare) site that they have purchased. Although some local clergy have allegedly expressed feelings of disapproval, the impoverished community has generally welcomed the project as a potentially good source of revenue. The tribe's proposal includes an outreach program that focuses on the similarity between the struggles of their own people and that of African Americans.

The county government has plans to improve the community with new mixed use residential developments on brownfields, new businesses, parks and open spaces.

There are currently no restaurants or markets in the town. The city of Richmond's redevelopment agency and Contra Costa County have been trying to revitalize the community's main road, Fred Jackson Way (formerly 3rd and Filbert Streets). In 2010 a thirty-six town home development was under construction to provide ultra low income housing that is planned to be kept affordable over time through a low equity scheme.

A county assessment has stated that the town is ideal for warehousing businesses due to its strategic location between Marin County, Sacramento, and the Silicon Valley in addition to its easy access to major freeways, railways, and an available workforce with affordable housing.

== See also ==
- Casino Proposals
