= Rollingwood, California =

Rollingwood
- Unincorporated Community; Census Designated Place
- Location in Contra Costa County and the state of California

- Location in the United States
- Coordinates: 37°57′55″N 122°19′48″W
- Country: United States
- State: California
- County: Contra Costa

Government
  - Type: Board of Supervisors
  - County Board: District 1: John Gioia
  - State Senate: Jesse Arreguín (D)
  - State Assembly: Buffy Wicks (D)
  - U. S. Congress: John Garamendi (D)

Area
  - Total: 0.173 sq mi (0.45 km^{2})
  - Land: 0.173 sq mi (0.45 km^{2})
  - Water: 0 sq mi (0 km^{2}) 0%
- Elevation: 75 ft (23 m)

Population (2020)
  - Total: 3,015
  - Density: 17,400/sq mi (6,730/km^{2})
- Time zone: UTC-8 (PST)
  - Summer (DST): UTC-7 (PDT)
- Postal code: 94806
- Area code: 510
- FIPS code: 06-62700
- GNIS feature IDs: 1853411, 2409202

Rollingwood is a census-designated place (CDP) in Contra Costa County, California, United States. As of the 2020 census, Rollingwood's population was 3,015.

== Geography ==
According to the United States Census Bureau, the CDP has a total area of 0.2 square miles (0.52 km^{2}), all land.

== History ==
The federal government contracted David Bohannon, one of the nation's lead mass production developers, to develop Rollingwood. Federal officials approved bank loans to finance construction, requiring that the homes not be sold to African-Americans.

In 1952, Wilbur Gary, an African-American navy war veteran, former shipyard worker, and building contractor, purchased a home in Rollingwood from fellow navy war veteran Lieutenant Commander Sidney Hogan. Gary's purchase provoked anger among residents of the formerly all-white town. Soon after the Garys arrived, a mob of 300 white residents gathered in front of Gary's house. The mob shouted racial epithets, hurled a brick through the family's window, and burned a cross on their front lawn.

== Demographics ==
Historical population
Census	Pop.	Note	%±
2000	2,900		—
2010	2,969		2.4%
2020	3,015		1.5%
U.S. Decennial Census; 1850–1870 1880-1890; 1900 1910 1920; 1930 1940 1950; 1960 1970 1980; 1990 2000 2010

Rollingwood first appeared as a census designated place in the 2000 U.S. census.

=== Racial and ethnic composition ===
Rollingwood CDP, California – Racial and ethnic composition Note: the US Census treats Hispanic/Latino as an ethnic category. This table excludes Latinos from the racial categories and assigns them to a separate category. Hispanics/Latinos may be of any race.
Race / Ethnicity (NH = Non-Hispanic)	Pop 2000	Pop 2010	Pop 2020	% 2000	% 2010	% 2020
White alone (NH)	581	339	242	20.03%	11.42%	8.03%
Black or African American alone (NH)	261	179	109	9.00%	6.03%	3.62%
Native American or Alaska Native alone (NH)	17	6	1	0.59%	0.20%	0.03%
Asian alone (NH)	689	521	505	23.76%	17.55%	16.75%
Native Hawaiian or Pacific Islander alone (NH)	11	20	37	0.38%	0.67%	1.23%
Other race alone (NH)	12	15	13	0.41%	0.51%	0.43%
Mixed race or Multiracial (NH)	104	53	69	3.59%	1.79%	2.29%
Hispanic or Latino (any race)	1,225	1,836	2,039	42.24%	61.84%	67.63%
Total	2,900	2,969	3,015	100.00%	100.00%	100.00%

=== 2020 census ===
As of the 2020 census, Rollingwood had a population of 3,015. The population density was 17,427.7 inhabitants per square mile (6,728.9/km^{2}). The median age was 34.4 years. 23.5% of residents were under the age of 18 and 10.4% of residents were 65 years of age or older. For every 100 females there were 100.9 males, and for every 100 females age 18 and over there were 98.6 males age 18 and over.

The census reported that 99.7% of the population lived in households and 0.3% were institutionalized. 100.0% of residents lived in urban areas, while 0.0% lived in rural areas.

There were 727 households in Rollingwood, of which 47.5% had children under the age of 18 living in them. Of all households, 57.1% were married-couple households, 5.4% were cohabiting couple households, 14.2% were households with a male householder and no spouse or partner present, and 23.4% were households with a female householder and no spouse or partner present. About 6.7% of all households were made up of individuals, and 3.0% had someone living alone who was 65 years of age or older. The average household size was 4.13. There were 638 families (87.8% of all households).

There were 745 housing units at an average density of 4,306.4 units per square mile (1,662.7 units/km^{2}), of which 727 (97.6%) were occupied. Of these, 60.9% were owner-occupied, and 39.1% were occupied by renters. Of all housing units, 2.4% were vacant. The homeowner vacancy rate was 0.0% and the rental vacancy rate was 3.1%.

== Education ==
Rollingwood is in the West Contra Costa Unified School District.
