= East Richmond Heights, California =

Unincorporated community in California, United States

East Richmond Heights
- Census-designated place
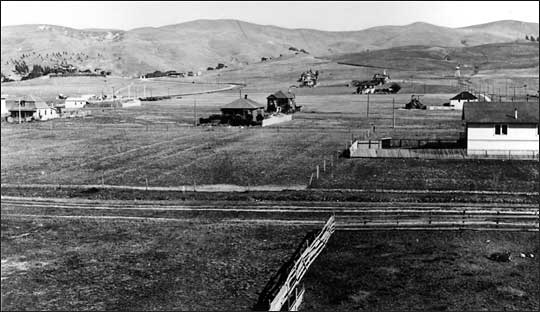
- East Richmond Heights in 1912

- Location in Contra Costa County and the state of California

- Location in the United States
- Coordinates: 37°56′42″N 122°18′49″W
- Country: United States
- State: California
- County: Contra Costa

Government
  - State Senate: Jesse Arreguín (D)
  - State Assembly: Buffy Wicks (D)
  - U. S. Congress: John Garamendi (D)
  - Supervisor: John Gioia

Area
  - Total: 0.580 sq mi (1.50 km^{2})
  - Land: 0.580 sq mi (1.50 km^{2})
  - Water: 0 sq mi (0 km^{2}) 0%
- Elevation: 387 ft (118 m)

Population (2020)
  - Total: 3,460
  - Density: 5,970/sq mi (2,300/km^{2})
- Time zone: UTC-8 (PST)
  - Summer (DST): UTC-7 (PDT)
- ZIP code: 94805
- Area codes: 510, 341
- FIPS code: 06-21061
- GNIS feature IDs: 1867019, 2408035

East Richmond Heights is an unincorporated community and census-designated place (CDP) in western Contra Costa County, California, United States. Its population was 3,460 at the 2020 census.

== Geography ==
Situated at the northern end of the Berkeley Hills, East Richmond Heights overlooks the northern part of the San Francisco Bay. This small residential community is bordered by El Cerrito to the south, with the Richmond Heights neighborhood of Richmond to the west, and Wildcat Canyon Regional Park to the north and east.

Arlington Boulevard, a major north–south thoroughfare traversing the Berkeley and El Cerrito portions of the Berkeley Hills, runs through the center of the community and terminates at its north end. Interstate 80 is located approximately one-half mile to the west, and provides access to the community via its Solano and McBryde Avenue exits.

According to the United States Census Bureau, the community has a total area of 0.6 square miles (1.6 km^{2}), all land.

== Government and municipal services ==
Police services for the community are provided by the Contra Costa County Sheriff's Office Bay Station. Traffic services are handled by the California Highway Patrol. The county contracts with the adjacent city of Richmond to provide fire fighting services. Garbage, recycling, and compost collection are provided by Republic Services. Mail delivered to addresses within the community are addressed to the city of Richmond or El Cerrito depending on their location within the CDP. Nonetheless, these addresses are not located within Richmond or El Cerrito.

The East Richmond Heights Municipal Advisory Council (ERHMAC), a council of community residents established by the Contra Costa County Board of Supervisors, advises the board on issues of concern to the community.

== Education ==
The community is served by the West Contra Costa Unified School District.

East Richmond Heights is home to Mira Vista Elementary School, which is part of the school district. Additionally, Adams Middle School (now closed), a portion of Serra Adult School (now West County Mandarin School) and Saint David School are also located within the CDP. Also, one of the country's oldest cooperative elementary schools, Crestmont School, is located within the CDP on Arlington Boulevard.

== Commerce ==
This mostly residential community is home to a few small retail businesses including a market and laundromat.

== Demographics ==
Historical population
Census	Pop.	Note	%±
1990	3,266		—
2000	3,357		2.8%
2010	3,280		−2.3%
2020	3,460		5.5%
U.S. Decennial Census; 1860–1870 1880-1890; 1900 1910 1920; 1930 1940 1950; 1960 1970 1980; 1990 2000 2010

East Richmond Heights first appeared as a census-designated place in the 1990 United States census.

=== Racial and ethnic composition ===
East Richmond Heights CDP, California – Racial and ethnic composition Note: the US Census treats Hispanic/Latino as an ethnic category. This table excludes Latinos from the racial categories and assigns them to a separate category. Hispanics/Latinos may be of any race.
Race / Ethnicity (NH = Non-Hispanic)	Pop 2000	Pop 2010	Pop 2020	% 2000	% 2010	% 2020
White alone (NH)	1,971	1,816	1,819	58.71%	55.37%	52.57%
Black or African American alone (NH)	460	380	309	13.70%	11.59%	8.93%
Native American or Alaska Native alone (NH)	15	1	6	0.45%	0.03%	0.17%
Asian alone (NH)	358	394	459	10.66%	12.01%	13.27%
Native Hawaiian or Pacific Islander alone (NH)	15	8	13	0.45%	0.24%	0.38%
Other race alone (NH)	15	16	38	0.45%	0.49%	1.10%
Mixed race or Multiracial (NH)	165	200	305	4.92%	6.10%	8.82%
Hispanic or Latino (any race)	358	465	511	10.66%	14.18%	14.77%
Total	3,357	3,280	3,460	100.00%	100.00%	100.00%

=== 2020 census ===
As of the 2020 census, East Richmond Heights had a population of 3,460 and a population density of 5,965.5 inhabitants per square mile (2,303.3/km^{2}). The median age was 47.0 years. 17.5% of residents were under the age of 18 and 24.0% were 65 years of age or older. For every 100 females, there were 94.5 males, and for every 100 females age 18 and over, there were 91.8 males age 18 and over.

98.8% of residents lived in urban areas and 1.2% lived in rural areas. The census reported that 99.4% of the population lived in households, 0.3% lived in non-institutionalized group quarters, and 0.3% were institutionalized.

There were 1,415 households, out of which 28.8% included children under the age of 18. Of all households, 50.5% were married-couple households, 7.7% were cohabiting couple households, 26.1% had a female householder with no partner present, and 15.7% had a male householder with no partner present. 25.1% of households were one person, and 12.7% were one person aged 65 or older. The average household size was 2.43. There were 941 families (66.5% of all households).

There were 1,468 housing units at an average density of 2,531.0 units per square mile (977.2 units/km^{2}), of which 1,415 (96.4%) were occupied and 3.6% were vacant. Of occupied units, 79.9% were owner-occupied and 20.1% were occupied by renters. The homeowner vacancy rate was 0.4% and the rental vacancy rate was 2.0%.

=== Language ===
The percentages of languages spoken by residents in East Richmond Heights are 87.80% English, 8.59% Spanish, 1.54% Vietnamese, 1.37% Cantonese, and 0.68% Japanese.

== Notes ==
- "East Richmond Heights". Geographic Names Information System. United States Geological Survey, United States Department of the Interior.
