= Scotts Valley Band of Pomo Indians of California =

Pomo and Wailaki tribal group in Lake County, California

Scotts Valley Band of Pomo Indians
Ye-Ma-Bax

Total population
- 110 Adult Members; 280 Members (estimate)

Regions with significant populations
- United States (California)

Languages
- English, Eastern Pomo, Hokan

Related ethnic groups
- Pomo and Wailaki tribes Hokan

The Scotts Valley Band of Pomo Indians of California, also known as the Scott's Valley Band of Pomo Indians of the Sugar Bowl Rancheria, is a federally recognized tribe of Pomo and Wailaki Indians in Lake County.

== History ==
After severed ties with the United States, there is limited research and Information about the Scotts Valley Band of Pomo Indians. The Band lived peacefully throughout the Bay Area and Northern California. This changed when settlers arrived, and the band of natives were killed, beaten and turned into slaves. They were forced to move to the Mendocino and Round Valley Reservations. In 1972, a federal task force concluded that the Scotts Valley Band of Pomo Indians was the only Pomo Indian Tribe that should be entirely relocated, and the Bureau of Indian Affairs (BIA) relocated a vast majority of Tribal Members to the Bay Area.

They have purchased land entered into a federal trust in North Richmond, California where they have garnered approval for the Sugar Bowl Casino. These plans have since been terminated.

The tribe applied to put six parcels of land, totaling 29.87 acres (120,900 m^{2}), into federal trust.

In 2011, there was a project to help develop a Scotts Valley Energy Development Office. The purpose of the project was to further support the mission of the tribe’s existing leadership position as the U.S. Department of Energy (DOE) Tribal Multi-County Weatherization Energy Program (TMCWEP) in creating jobs and providing tribal homes and buildings with weatherization assistance to increase energy efficiency, occupant comfort, and indoor air quality. By training tribal members in energy efficiency, they are continuing to change and adapt with the modern world while also following their tribal traditions.

== Tribal status ==
The US federal government terminated relations with the Scotts Valley Pomo, but the tribe regained their federal recognition in 1991. There are approximately 330 enrolled members living in Lake County. They conduct business from Kelseyville Concord California and Lakeport, California.

Other bands of Pomo include the Lytton Band of Pomo Indians and the Guideville Band of Pomo Indians.

== Tribal Code ==
Due to the fact that they have been misrepresented and dismissed as a tribe for many years, they have included tribal codes and tribal traditions on websites, in order to continue to express the importance of their tribe. Their tribal code contains procedures for tribal council meetings, gaming ordinance, establishing regulations and procedures governing enrollment of members into the Scotts Valley band of Pomo Indians. Tribal codes are traditions that have been passed along with tribes such as the Choctaw and Cherokee, and the Pomo Indians should be no exception. It is stated by the Scotts Valley Tribal TANF that the Pomo Indians is the “Health and Human Services (HHS) Administration for Children and Families (ACF) designated social services provider for Contra Costa County and provides assistance under the Tribal TANF program to all eligible Native American Families residing in the country.

== Reservation ==
The Scotts Valley Pomo Tribe's former reservation, the Sugar Bowl Rancheria, was eliminated by the US government, so the tribe is seeking to rebuild its land base.

== See also ==
- Pomo people

== Bibliography ==
- About. (n.d.). Retrieved from http://www.svpomo-epa.org/about/
- (n.d.). Retrieved from https://www.narf.org/nill/tribes/scotts_valley.html
- Scotts Valley Band of Pomo Indians - 2011 Project. (n.d.). Retrieved from https://www.energy.gov/indianenergy/scotts-valley-band-pomo-indians-2011-project
- Scotts Valley Tribal TANF. (n.d.). Retrieved from http://www.svtribaltanf.org/
- Tribal History - Scott's Valley EPA & NRD. (n.d.). Retrieved from https://sites.google.com/site/svpomo/tribal-history
- Glidden, J. (2019, August 29). Federal government rejects Scotts Valley Indian casino in North Vallejo. Retrieved from https://www.timesheraldonline.com/2019/08/27/federal-government-rejects-scotts-valley-indian-casino-in-north-vallejo/
