= San Pablo Lytton Casino =

Coordinates: 37°57′09″N 122°20′04″W

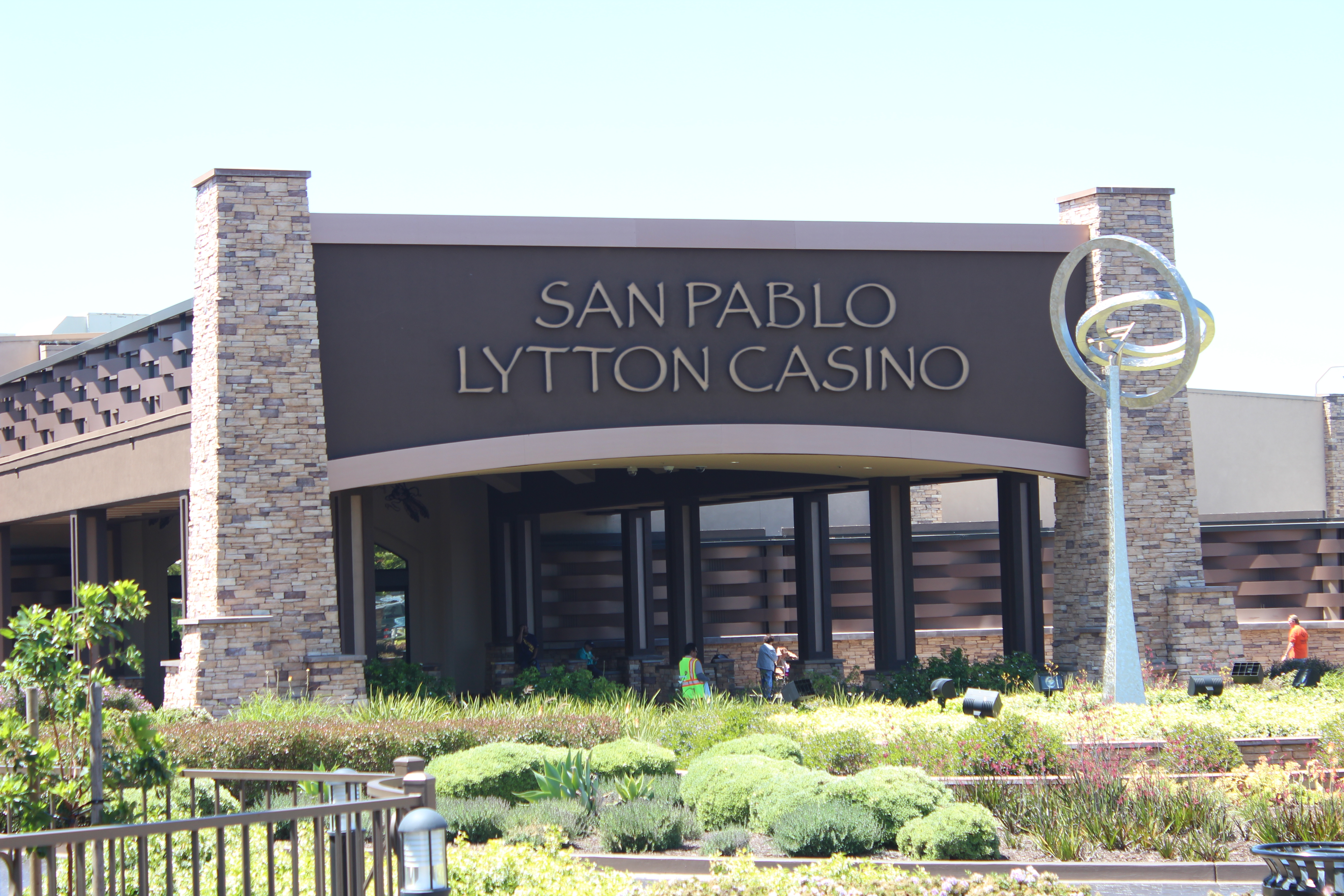
Front entrance to the San Pablo Lytton Casino in San Pablo, California

Casino San Pablo is a Native American reservation with a gambling hall located in San Pablo, California. It is operated by the Lytton Band of Pomo Indians. It is adjacent to the site of the now demolished Doctors Medical Center. The former medical center was sold to the tribe in 2017, demolished, and replaced with parking lots.

== History ==
The site, formerly a trailer park and the Lucky Lanes bowling alley, was converted into parking and a card club in 1994. Later in 2002, restricted gambling was permitted. The casino shares its revenues with the city of San Pablo (7%) where it forms the city's economic backbone.

In 2005 the casino was expanded into a "full-fledged" casino with slot machines and video bingo. However, by 2016 the workers who were making an average of $12 an hour were complaining that it was too low with the salaries at nearby Oaks Card Club being $14 and Graton Casino also hovering around $14 and thus asked for a 12% wage hike. In 2014 the casino was making an estimated $277 million annually. Nevertheless, the tribe of 350 people was reported to be paying its unionized employees $9.50 an hour on average just 5 years earlier.

Then-California Assembly member Loni Hancock opposed adding the video bingo machines because she said that they look and feel like real slot machines and amounted to a technological loophole and that it would bring more traffic and crime to the area.

In 2018 the tribe donated $1 million to a fund to support the victims of the Camp Fire.

In 2019 patrons of the casino were followed home and robbed at gunpoint across the bay in South San Francisco. Three men were arrested and charged with armed robbery and associated crimes; two were eventually sentenced to a combined total of thirty-one years in state prison, while the third was released for lack of evidence.

Also in 2019 the casino bought the former hospital site for $13.5 million and razed it to expand parking by 1,000 spaces. It was believed this would alleviate parking in the surrounding neighborhoods and be of economic benefit to the city of San Pablo, which receives over 50% of its funding from casino revenues.

In 2019, with the help of Congressman Jared Huffman, the tribe was seeking to establish a non-gambling homeland nearby to Windsor in Sonoma County. The plans are to build housing, a resort hotel, and a winery on a 500-acre site. It is known as the Lytton Rancheria Homelands Act.

Also in 2019, a Daly City woman won nearly $781,000 in a jackpot from a slot machine here.
