= Winehaven Winery =

Winery in Chisago City, Minnesota, US

Coordinates: 45.36878°N 92.90229°W

Winehaven Company Logo

Winehaven Winery and Vineyard is a family owned and operated winery located in Chisago City, Minnesota and has been in operation since 1995. Its vineyard consists of 15 acres (61,000 m^{2}) of various winter-hardy grapes. In October 2009, Minneapolis/St. Paul Business Journal ranked Winehaven number one in Minnesota in case production.

== History ==
Prior to establishing a vineyard and winery, the Peterson family cultivated bees in the St. Croix River Valley for 3 generations. The first type of wine produced was mead (honey wine) made from Peterson Honey. To reflect its background in honey production, the official logo of Winehaven consists of an image of a honey bee together with the brand name.

== Awards ==
Winehaven is among the most awarded wineries in the Upper Midwest, having earned over 100 medals from international competitions in New York, California, Indiana and Minnesota. Included among Winehaven's more notable awards are:

- Semi-Sweet Honey Wine- 2009 & 2010 Indy International Wine Competition, Honey Wine of the Year. 2010 Mazer Cup International Mead Competition, Best Traditional Semi-Sweet Mead.
- Merlot- 2006 San Francisco International Wine Competition, Best Merlot; Double Gold.
- Marechal Foch- 2008 Finger Lakes International Wine Competition, Double Gold.
- Grapewinds Port- 2010 Finger Lakes International Wine Competition, Gold.
- Chisago- 2010 International Eastern Wine Competition, Gold.
- Cranberry- 2010 International Cold Climate Wine Competition, Double Gold.
- Slippery Slope White Ice Wine- 2009 International Cold Climate Wine Competition, Best Specialty Wine.

== Varieties ==
Winehaven offers 19 types of wine made from a variety of fruits, honey and grapes, including several grape varieties which have been bred to be winter hardy in Minnesota. One variety of grape, Chisago, was developed by Kevin and Kyle Peterson of Winehaven and patented in 2008. The United States Patent and Trademark Office describes it as, “a new and distinct variety of grapevine designated `Chisago`, which has a combination of outstanding wine quality, vigor, disease resistance, and cold hardiness.” The Chisago grape is used in a variety of wines, which include a sweet Deer Garden Red, a desert-style Slippery Slope Red Ice Wine and a newer varietal sold under the name Chisago.
