= Bayview, Contra Costa County, California =

Bayview
- census-designated place
- Position in California.
- Coordinates: 38°00′25″N 122°19′08″W
- Country: United States
- State: California
- County: Contra Costa

Area
  - Total: 0.39 sq mi (1.00 km^{2})
  - Land: 0.31 sq mi (0.79 km^{2})
  - Water: 0.081 sq mi (0.21 km^{2}) 21%
- Elevation: 36 ft (11 m)

Population (2020)
  - Total: 1,782
  - Density: 5,848.0/sq mi (2,257.91/km^{2})
- Time zone: UTC-8 (Pacific (PST))
  - Summer (DST): UTC-7 (PDT)
- ZIP code: 94806
- Area code: 510, 341
- FIPS code: 06-04470
- GNIS feature IDs: 2413615, 2582940

Bayview is a census-designated place in Contra Costa County, California, United States. Bayview sits at an elevation of 36 feet (11 m). The 2020 United States census reported Bayview's population as 1,782. Prior to 2010, Bayview was part of the Bayview-Montalvin CDP and then separated into the two individual communities of Bayview and Montalvin Manor for the census.

== Geography ==
The CDP occupies an area of approximately 1 square kilometre (0.39 sq mi), of which 79% is land and 21% is water. It is located along San Pablo Bay, bordered on the southwest by Montalvin Manor, and on the east by Pinole.

== Demographics ==
Historical population
Census	Pop.	Note	%±
2010	1,754		—
2020	1,782		1.6%
U.S. Decennial Census; 2010

Bayview first appeared as a census designated place in the 2010 U.S. census after the Bayview-Montalvin CDP was split into the Bayview CDP and Montalvin Manor CDP.

The 2020 United States census reported that Bayview had a population of 1,782. The population density was 5,842.6 inhabitants per square mile (2,255.8/km^{2}). The racial makeup of Bayview was 32.2% White, 9.8% African American, 1.9% Native American, 26.5% Asian, 1.6% Pacific Islander, 16.7% from other races, and 11.4% from two or more races. Hispanic or Latino of any race were 29.6% of the population.

The census reported that 99.7% of the population lived in households, 0.3% lived in non-institutionalized group quarters, and no one was institutionalized.

There were 578 households, out of which 28.9% included children under the age of 18, 51.2% were married-couple households, 8.7% were cohabiting couple households, 22.5% had a female householder with no partner present, and 17.6% had a male householder with no partner present. 19.4% of households were one person, and 12.8% were one person aged 65 or older. The average household size was 3.07. There were 434 families (75.1% of all households).

The age distribution was 17.4% under the age of 18, 10.0% aged 18 to 24, 22.3% aged 25 to 44, 27.8% aged 45 to 64, and 22.5% who were 65 years of age or older. The median age was 45.3 years. For every 100 females, there were 97.6 males.

There were 590 housing units at an average density of 1,934.4 units per square mile (746.9 units/km^{2}), of which 578 (98.0%) were occupied. Of these, 82.0% were owner-occupied, and 18.0% were occupied by renters.

== Education ==
Bayview is served by the West Contra Costa Unified School District.
