= Contra Costa County Board of Supervisors =

Governing body of Contra Costa County, California

Contra Costa Board of Supervisors
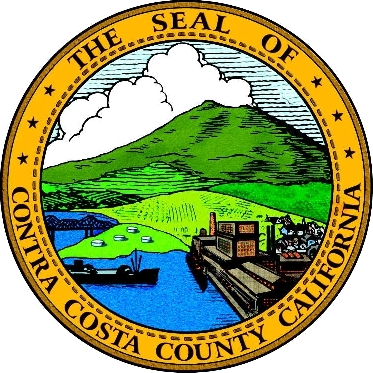

Leadership
- Chair: Candace Andersen since January 14, 2025

Structure
- Seats: 5
- Political groups: Officially nonpartisan
- Length of term: 4 years

Elections
- Last election: November 5, 2024
- Next election: June 2, 2026

Meeting place
- County Administration Building; Martinez, California

Website
- Contra Costa Board of Supervisors

The Contra Costa County Board of Supervisors is the five-member governing body for Contra Costa County, California, in the San Francisco Bay Area's East Bay region. Members of the Board of supervisors are elected from districts, based on their residence.

== History ==
Contra Costa County was incorporated as one of the original 27 California counties in 1850. The Board of Supervisors represents 19 cities and various unincorporated communities that are divided into five districts.

In 2000, Federal D. Glover was elected to the District 5 seat as the Board of Supervisors first African American member.

The Board approved changes during the redistricting process in 2021 that put all of Pinole in District 1 and Diablo and Blackhawk from District 3 to District 2.

District 4 Supervisor Ken Carlson was elected as the Board's first openly gay member in 2022.

In 2024, District 5 Supervisor Shanelle Scales-Preston was the first African American woman elected to the Board.

The current board chair is Candace Andersen, who represents District 2. District 3 Supervisor Diane Burgis is the current vice chair.

== Districts ==
District	Supervisor	Cities and unincorporated areas represented	First elected	Party (officially nonpartisan)
District 1	John Gioia	Richmond, El Cerrito, San Pablo, Pinole, the unincorporated communities of East Richmond Heights, El Sobrante, Kensington, Montalvin Manor, Tara Hills, North Richmond, and Rollingwood.	1998	Democratic
District 2	Candace Andersen	San Ramon, Danville, Alamo, Lafayette, Moraga, Orinda, Canyon, Rossmoor, Parkmead, Saranap, Blackhawk, Camino Tassajara, Diablo, and a portion of Walnut Creek.	2012	Republican
District 3	Diane Burgis	Antioch, Brentwood, Oakley, and the unincorporated areas of Bethel Island, Byron, Discovery Bay, and Knightsen.	2016	Democratic
District 4	Ken Carlson	Clayton, Concord, Pleasant Hill, most of Walnut Creek, and the unincorporated areas of Contra Costa Centre and Morgan Territory.	2022	Democratic
District 5	Shanelle Scales-Preston	Hercules, Martinez, Pittsburg, portions of Antioch, and the unincorporated areas of Alhambra Valley, Bay Point, Briones, Rodeo, Pacheco, Crockett, Tormey, Port Costa, Vine Hill, Reliez Valley, and Clyde.	2024	Democratic
