= Point San Pablo Harbor =

Human settlement in Richmond, California, United States of America

Coordinates: 37.9634°N 122.4183°W

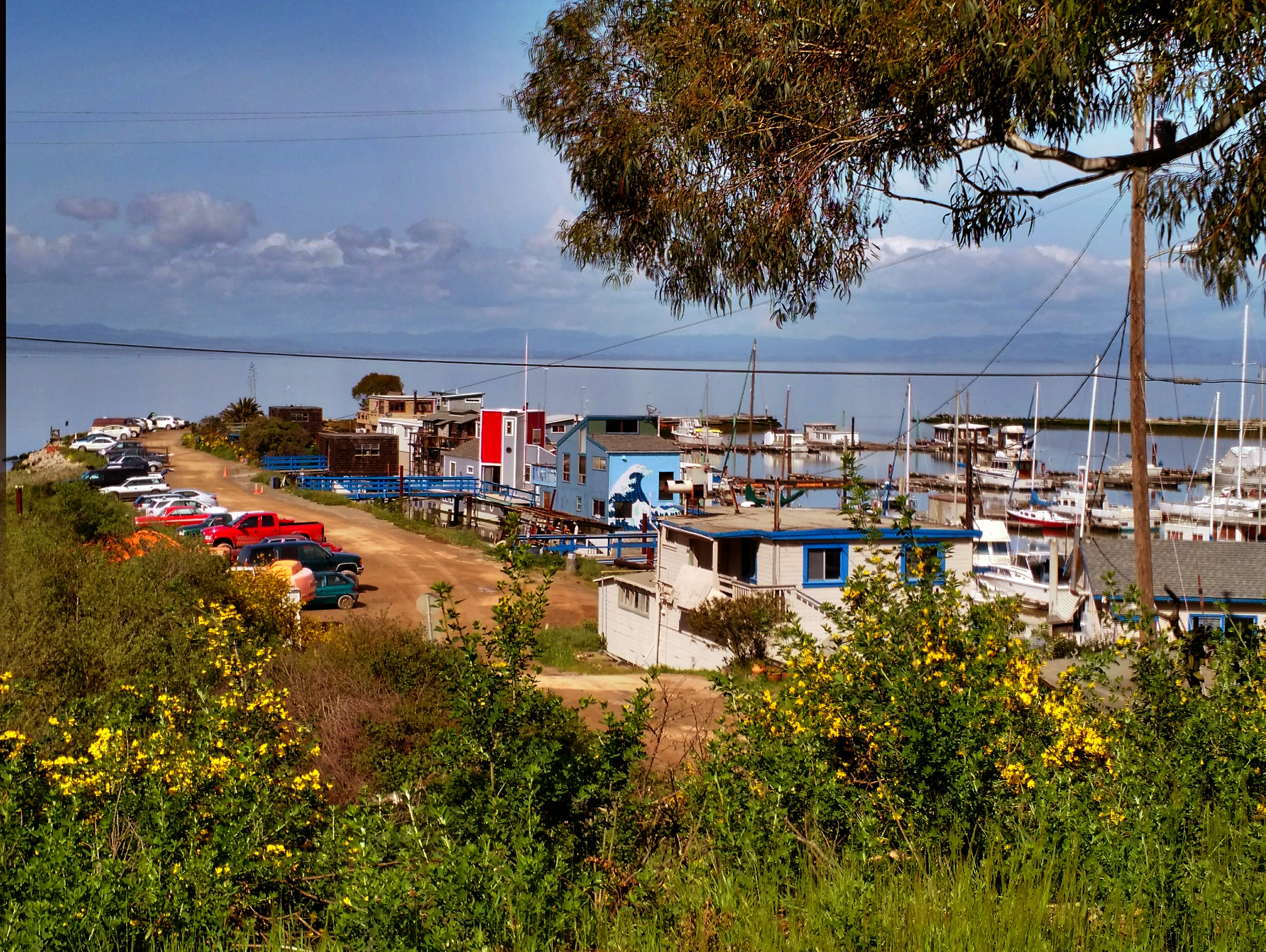
The marina as seen from the road leading in

Point San Pablo Harbor is a marina and small community at the far end of Point San Pablo in San Pablo Bay, within Richmond, in Contra Costa County, California. It is located at 1900 Stenmark Drive, Richmond CA 94801.

== Overview ==
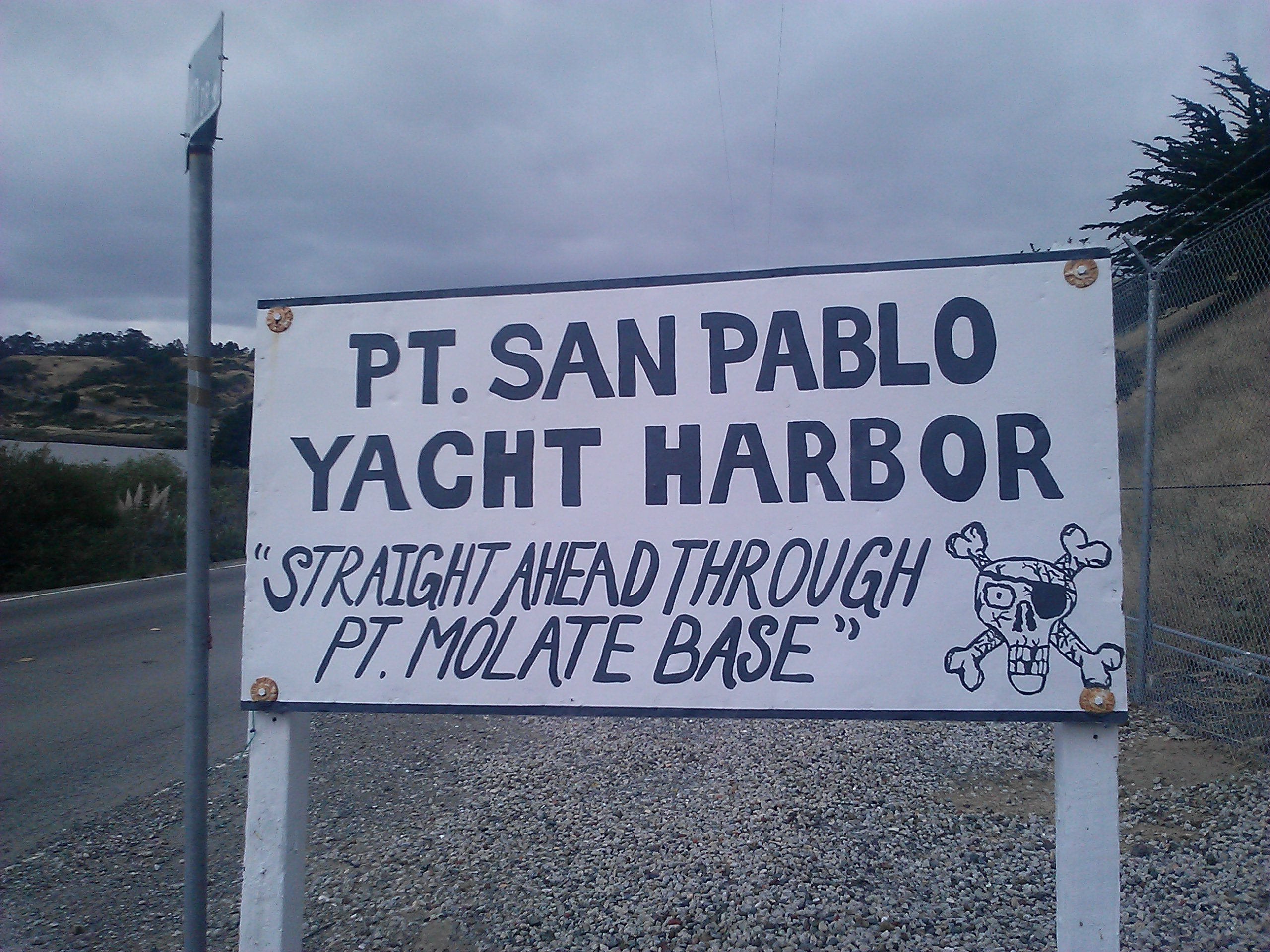

The community is home to a few dozen individuals living in boats and 10 floating homes. Point San Pablo Harbor was originally envisioned by Captain Clark who was the brainchild behind the origins of the Richmond San Rafael Ferry. The area also features the Point San Pablo Marina, Sailing Goat Restaurant, and The San Pablo Bay Sportsmen's Club. The harbor village is located in a ravine at the northern tip of the Potrero Hills and alongside a small cove the opens to San Pablo Bay, where the marina is protected from waves, in addition to a breakwater. The harbor is also the starting point for visitors to East Brother Light Station a historic landmark.

The area is near the Chevron Richmond Refinery and some tank farm containers are visible in addition to the Richmond Landfill across the waters of Castro Cove, a contaminated estuarine habitat with its own significant industrial history. According to NOAA, refinery and industrial wastewater was discharged into Castro Cove from 1902 through 1987, leaving sediments contaminated primarily with polycyclic aromatic hydrocarbons, or PAHs, and mercury. NOAA’s description of the site even uses Point San Pablo Yacht Harbor as one of the reference points defining the boundary of Castro Cove.

Farther west on Point San Pablo, Richmond Terminal 4 also has a documented history of petroleum and industrial chemical releases affecting soil and groundwater.

The harbor sits within an area with a well documented history of refinery operations, industrial contamination, and environmental cleanup.

The harbor has panoramic views of the undeveloped coastlines of southern Napa, Sonoma, and Solano counties and eastern central Marin County. The hills surrounding the village feature Eucalyptus trees and coastal chaparral vegetation. The isolation of the area and undeveloped lands make deer sightings commonplace. Other animals in the area include the endangered salt marsh harvest mouse and California clapper rail. The areas around the marina and breakwaters have many egrets, herons and other birds that enjoy the small wetlands areas.

The Point San Pablo Harbor is privately owned. The Point San Pablo Preservation Society is a non-profit organization located at the harbor. The society's goal is to preserve the harbor and surrounding lands and waterways for public use and enjoyment.

== See also ==
- San Pablo Peninsula
- San Pablo Bay topics
