= Tara Hills, California =

Tara Hills
- Census-designated place
- Location in Contra Costa County and the state of California

- Location in the United States
- Coordinates: 37°59′37″N 122°18′59″W
- Country: United States
- State: California
- County: Contra Costa

Government
  - County Supervisor: John Gioia
  - State Senate: Jesse Arreguín (D)
  - State Assembly: Buffy Wicks (D)
  - U. S. Congress: John Garamendi (D)

Area
  - Total: 0.667 sq mi (1.73 km^{2})
  - Land: 0.667 sq mi (1.73 km^{2})
  - Water: 0 sq mi (0 km^{2}) 0%
- Elevation: 92 ft (28 m)

Population (2020)
  - Total: 5,364
  - Density: 8,040/sq mi (3,110/km^{2})
- Time zone: UTC-8 (PST)
  - Summer (DST): UTC-7 (PDT)
- ZIP code: 94806
- Area codes: 510, 341
- FIPS code: 06-77924
- GNIS feature IDs: 1701652, 2410059

Tara Hills is a census-designated place (CDP) in Contra Costa County, California, United States. The population was 5,364 at the 2020 census.

== Geography ==
According to the United States Census Bureau, the CDP has a total area of 0.67 square miles (1.7 km^{2}), all land. Tara Hills is located in the San Francisco Bay Area region of Northern California.

Although this is a census area, outside of the City of San Pablo, the mailing addresses are San Pablo, California.

== Demographics ==
Historical population
Census	Pop.	Note	%±
1990	4,998		—
2000	5,332		6.7%
2010	5,126		−3.9%
2020	5,364		4.6%
U.S. Decennial Census; 1850–1870 1880-1890; 1900 1910 1920; 1930 1940 1950; 1960 1970 1980; 1990 2000 2010

Tara Hills first appeared as a census-designated place in the 1990 United States census.

=== Racial and ethnic composition ===
Tara Hills CDP, California – Racial and ethnic composition Note: the US Census treats Hispanic/Latino as an ethnic category. This table excludes Latinos from the racial categories and assigns them to a separate category. Hispanics/Latinos may be of any race.
Race / Ethnicity (NH = Non-Hispanic)	Pop 2000	Pop 2010	Pop 2020	% 2000	% 2010	% 2020
White alone (NH)	2,299	1,453	1,146	43.12%	28.35%	21.36%
Black or African American alone (NH)	757	658	594	14.20%	12.84%	11.07%
Native American or Alaska Native alone (NH)	25	11	18	0.47%	0.21%	0.34%
Asian alone (NH)	752	864	1,112	14.10%	16.86%	20.73%
Native Hawaiian or Pacific Islander alone (NH)	27	17	15	0.51%	0.33%	0.28%
Other race alone (NH)	11	20	41	0.21%	0.39%	0.76%
Mixed race or Multiracial (NH)	188	156	233	3.53%	3.04%	4.34%
Hispanic or Latino (any race)	1,273	1,947	2,205	23.87%	37.98%	41.11%
Total	5,332	5,126	5,364	100.00%	100.00%	100.00%

=== 2020 census ===
As of the 2020 census, Tara Hills had a population of 5,364. The population density was 8,042.0 inhabitants per square mile (3,105.0/km^{2}). The racial makeup of Tara Hills was 26.4% White, 11.3% African American, 1.5% Native American, 21.0% Asian, 0.3% Pacific Islander, 25.4% from other races, and 14.1% from two or more races. Hispanic or Latino people of any race were 41.1% of the population.

The age distribution was 20.7% under the age of 18, 8.8% aged 18 to 24, 27.4% aged 25 to 44, 27.5% aged 45 to 64, and 15.6% who were 65 years of age or older. The median age was 39.2 years. For every 100 females, there were 94.1 males, and for every 100 females age 18 and over there were 92.6 males age 18 and over.

The census reported that 99.8% of the population lived in households, 0.2% lived in non-institutionalized group quarters, and 0.0% were institutionalized. 100.0% of residents lived in urban areas, while 0.0% lived in rural areas.

There were 1,737 households, out of which 34.7% included children under the age of 18, 49.5% were married-couple households, 5.7% were cohabiting couple households, 27.2% had a female householder with no spouse or partner present, and 17.6% had a male householder with no spouse or partner present. 20.4% of households were one person, and 9.4% were one person aged 65 or older. The average household size was 3.08. There were 1,294 families (74.5% of all households).

There were 1,778 housing units at an average density of 2,665.7 units per square mile (1,029.2 units/km^{2}), of which 1,737 (97.7%) were occupied. Of these, 66.0% were owner-occupied, and 34.0% were occupied by renters. Of all housing units, 2.3% were vacant; the homeowner vacancy rate was 0.4% and the rental vacancy rate was 3.3%.

=== Income and poverty ===
In 2023, the US Census Bureau estimated that the median household income was $116,415, and the per capita income was $45,330.

== Commerce ==
The neighborhood is near two shopping centers.

The eastern and upper border has Pinole Square (previously known as Appian 80) at the intersection of Appian Way and I-80.

At the west end near San Pablo Bay, the Spectrum Center Tara Hills Campus occupies most of the Tara Hills old Shopping Center.

San Pablo Avenue borders the northwestern side of the neighborhood and is home to many businesses.

== Education ==
Tara Hills is in the West Contra Costa Unified School District.
