= Nat Bates =

American politician

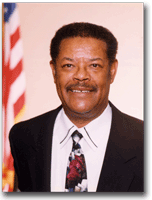

Mayor of Richmond, California
- In office 1971–1972
- Preceded by: Don Wagerman
- Succeeded by: A.E. Silva
- In office 1976–1977
- Preceded by: Booker T. Anderson
- Succeeded by: Lonnie Washington

City Council of Richmond, California
- Incumbent
- Assumed office 1995
- In office 1967–1983

Personal details
- Born: Nathaniel Rubin Bates; 1931 (age 94–95)

Nathaniel Bates is a former mayor and eight-term city councilman of Richmond, California in addition to being a former professional baseball player in the Canadian League in his earlier years.

== History ==
He arrived in Richmond in 1942 by train from Texas to join his mother whom worked at the Kaiser Shipyards for the World War II home front. He later served in the United States Army and later as a probation officer for Alameda County. Bates was first elected city councilman in 1967 for a six-year-term. He was appointed mayor from 1971 to 1972. He was subsequently re-elected in 1973 to a second term. Then he was elected again for a four-year term (the voters decreased the term) in 1979 until the end of his term in 1983. He was again appointed mayor from 1976 to 1977. That however was not the end of his career; he ran again in 1995 and won a four-year term being re-elected in 1999, 2004, 2008, and 2012. He is a Democrat and ran again winning an 8th term in 2018. At this point in his career he was being called the most "conservative" man on the city council.

In 2001 there was a controversy between him and councilman John Marquez over who received more time at the microphone at the city's Cinco de Mayo event.

Bates claimed the event should have been called "Marquez de Mayo" and stated that he just wanted time to address the crowd as well. City manager when questioned stated "he did not want to touch" the matter and later Bates requested an investigation into the conduct by the parks department and filed a complaint with mayor Rosemary Corbin. The East Bay Express newspaper published a political cartoon of him characterized as a "big baby".

In 2011 when deciding placing the first in the nation municipal soda tax ballot he voted no. He stated he felt it would lead people to buy soda outside the city, and that it targeted black people. Although the latter was contradicted by his fellow councilmember Jovanka Beckles who is also black and chastized him and Corky Boozé (also black) for not supporting the measure that she reported disproportionately affected people of color.

== Biography ==
Bates has lived in Richmond since the 1940s. He is a retired probation officer. He spent two seasons in the 1950s playing professional baseball in western Canada. He holds a BA from San Francisco State University and a teaching credential from CSU Hayward (now called CSU East Bay).

He was a National League of Cities Board director from 1976–1980 and has a lifetime appointment to National League of Cities Advisory Board since 1980.

=== Personal life ===
With his late wife, Shirley Christine Adams Bates, he had four children (one of whom is deceased), in addition to seven grandchildren, and seven great grandchildren, as reported in 2004.
