= Lytton Band of Pomo Indians =

The Lytton Band of Pomo Indians is a federally recognized tribe of Pomo Native Americans. They were recognized in the late 1980s, as lineal descendants of the two families who lived at the Lytton Rancheria in Healdsburg, California from 1937 to about 1960. The tribe now has around 275 enrolled members. It has a casino in San Pablo, California, and has proposed to build housing for tribe members, plus a winery and a hotel, just west of Windsor, California, in Sonoma County.

== History ==
The tribe was founded in 1937 by Bert Steele, who was one-quarter Achomawi and part Nomlaki, and his wife, a Pomo from Bodega Bay, when they successfully petitioned the U.S. Office of Indian Affairs for the right to build on a 50-acre (200,000 m^{2}) plot north of Healdsburg north of Lytton Station Road after Steele's home was destroyed in a flood. Along with his brother-in-law, John Myers, and his wife, Mary Myers Steele (both Pomo from Sonoma), he moved onto the land, which the government had set aside for Native Americans. This land became the Lytton Rancheria and the namesake for the tribe.

In 1958, in accordance with a policy of assimilating Native Americans into the rest of American society, Congress terminated the federal trust in the reservations lands of over forty California bands, including the Lytton Rancheria. The Lytton band was dissolved and its land was deeded to its members. As part of the agreement, the government agreed to perform several improvements on the land, such as building roads and installing sewage service, but failed to do so. Within a year, the land-owning Lyttons had all sold, for reasons that are not clear; some current tribe members say that their ancestors did not understand property taxes and so were forced to sell, while other sources dispute that claim.

In 1991 the Lyttons successfully petitioned the government to restore their tribal status. Though the Lytton Band does not divulge a complete list of members, as of April 5, 2005 there are about 275 members.

Other bands of Pomo include the Guideville Band of Pomo Indians and the Scotts Valley Band of Pomo Indians.

== Language ==
The Pomoan, or Pomo /ˈpoʊmoʊ/, languages are a small family of Native Californian languages spoken by the Pomo people who formerly occupied the valley of the Russian River and the Clear Lake basin. The Pomoan languages are severely endangered – with the exception of Kashaya, which had few dozen speakers in the 1990s, they are spoken by only a handful of elderly people. Northern Pomo and Northeastern Pomo are without known speakers and presumed to be extinct.

A vast majority of people in the Lytton Rancheria speak English.

== Government ==
The Lytton Band of Pomo Indians Tribal Office is located on 1300 N Dutton Ave # A, Santa Rosa, CA 95401. They are governed by a democratically elected tribal council, with a working constitution. The tribe does not reveal its list of members, nor its constitution, so a majority of administration is unknown to the public. Their current administration is as follows:

- Marjorie Mejia, Tribal Chairperson

== Casino in San Pablo ==
=== Acquisition ===
After the community of American Canyon rebuffed the Lyttons' attempts to turn an existing cardroom into a casino, the Lyttons set their sights on the city of San Pablo, home of the Casino San Pablo (CSP) cardroom. Cardrooms are California gambling establishments where the house has no stake in the games. Customers typically pay a fixed amount to the house per hand, regardless of whether they win or lose.

With the assistance of the city of San Pablo and the Hotel Employees and Restaurant Employees Union, the Lyttons lobbied local Congressman George Miller to help turn Casino San Pablo into their reservation. Under the terms of the Indian Gaming Regulatory Act, only tribes who acquired land prior to 1988 would be eligible to operate casinos on their land. Because the Lyttons had regained their tribal status in 1991, and so were ineligible. Miller added a provision to the Omnibus Indian Advancement Act of 2000 that took CSP into federal trust and backdated its acquisition to 1988. When President Clinton signed the bill into law, the Lyttons gained the right to turn the CSP, formerly a low-stakes cardroom, into a full-fledged casino with much more profitable gambling devices and games such as slot machines and blackjack.

Miller's backdating clause, in a section labeled "technical corrections," has been described as "midnight legislation" and "underhanded". Professor I. Nelson Rose, a gambling law expert from Whittier College, said the bill "bordered on illegal". Others dispute that the language was added inappropriately; a former staffer for U.S. Senator Daniel Inouye described the process as nothing out of the ordinary, saying, "That's the way the republic works".

=== Expansion plans ===
In order to operate so-called Class III games, such as slot machines, Native American casinos must negotiate a compact with the state; the Lyttons have revised their casino plans several times in the hopes of procuring such a compact from California. One element of the plan has been the Lyttons' request that the state grant them a monopoly on gaming within a 35-mile (56 km) radius of CSP.

After acquiring CSP, the Lyttons announced plans to expand it from 70,000 square feet (6,500 m^{2}) into a 600,000-square-foot (56,000 m^{2}), six- to eight-story casino, with up to 5,000 slot machines, which would make it bigger than the MGM Grand casino in Las Vegas, Nevada. U.S. Senator Dianne Feinstein (D-CA) expressed opposition in 2003, citing concerns that "off-reservation gambling" would be a strain on local resources, aggravate traffic congestion and increase crime. But on August 19, 2004, Governor Arnold Schwarzenegger announced an agreement to create such a casino, an agreement that required approval by the State Legislature and the U.S. Department of the Interior.

There was immediate local opposition to the agreement, including the California Assemblywoman Loni Hancock, and mayor of the neighboring city of Richmond. Facing bipartisan opposition from the California State Legislature, within a week of the agreement with the governor, the Lyttons revised the proposed figure to 2,500 slots.

In February 2005, San Pablo City Council voted unanimously to urge state legislators to pass the required enabling act, while in the city council in nearby Albany unanimously voted to oppose that. In April 2005, U.S. Senator John McCain (R-AZ) attacked the proposed compact. Tribal spokespeople countered that the casino was "the final act in redressing the wrongs", the reparations for the government's dissolution of their tribe's legal status and reservation lands. In addition, they said the casino would create 6,600 jobs and would provide the city, county, and state governments with 25 percent of gaming revenue.

In August 2005, after failing to get a compact based on the revised plan, the Lyttons added 500 "video bingo" machines to CSP. As Class II machines, these did not require a state compact. By mid-2006 there were over 800 new gaming devices in use.

In 2007, the tribe reached an agreement with Feinstein: the tribe would no longer try to get approval to build a larger casino, or get Class III slot machines, and Feinstein would drop legislation that would have forced the tribe to go through rigorous federal and state approvals to offer even the existing Class II gaming in their casino.

=== Operations ===
Annual proceeds from the casino were estimated to be more than $180 million annually as of 2014. Under a 1999 Municipal Services Agreement, the tribe pays the city of San Pablo 7.5 percent of revenues; in 2014, that was more than $15 million, a decrease from $22.6 million in 2003. The amount is tied to the casino's status as a Class II facility. If it became a Class III (Las Vegas-type) facility, the annual payment amount would be much smaller. The tribe pays nothing to the State of California.

As of 2011, about 200 workers at the casino belonged to a union, Unite Here Local 2850. That year, their average salary was $9.50 per hour. In May 2014, after years of dispute, the union and the tribe reached an agreement that provided for wage increases and minimized the increase in health care costs to be paid by employees.

== Charity ==
The Lytton Band of Pomo Indians supports many charities. Their current sponsorship as follows:

- Schulz Celebrity Golf Classic
- Luther Burbank Center for the Arts
- Windsor Fire Protection District
- The Boys & Girls Club of Central Sonoma County
- PDI Surgery Center in Windsor

== Sonoma County lands ==
In 2002, an investor group that had collaborated with the tribe on the San Pablo casino project purchased 50 acres of land west of Windsor, California, a town just to the south of Healdsburg. The tribe, which expected to acquire that land from the investor group, said it wanted to build homes, a community center and a ceremonial roundhouse on the land. The Windsor town council responded by going on record as opposing the tribe's plans to develop the land beyond the one home per five acres allowed by the county's general plan.

In April 2009, the tribe applied to the Bureau of Indian Affairs (BIA) to have 100 acres of land - it had purchased more land to the west of Windsor - taken into federal trust. The tribe said it wanted to build 145 homes and a community center for tribal members on the site. In May, the Windsor town council voted 4–1 to oppose the tribe's plans. Tribal representatives said if they could not get Windsor to extend utility service to the land, they would use well water and build their own sewer plant.

In 2012 and 2013, the tribe purchased more than a dozen properties in Sonoma County, paying more than $47 million. About 2,000 acres were owned by the end of 2013, including more than $22 million of vineyards and pasture in the Alexander and Russian River Valleys, 650 acres near the Sonoma Coast, and about 400 acres in the Windsor area.

In March 2015, the Sonoma County supervisors approved an agreement with the tribe that prohibits the tribe from developing a casino, but allows development of a 200,000-case winery and a 200-room resort. Under the 22-year agreement, the tribe would pay the county $6.1 million for one-time impacts, and would pay the same property taxes and hotel-bed taxes that would be required if the lands were not in federal trust. A representative for the tribe said that future plans could also involve building 214 houses in addition to the approximately 150 it had proposed in its application to BIA.

In May 2015, Congressman Jared Huffman (D-San Rafael) introduced a bill to take land near Windsor, owned by the tribe, into federal trust for housing and other non-gaming purposes as part of a new Lytton Rancheria reservation for the tribe. Huffman said he proposed to create the Indian lands through an act of Congress instead of through the BIA process because a Congressional act could completely prevent a casino, and could bring more certainty over what could be built and how the impacts would be offset. In July, opponents packed a Windsor town council meeting to request that the council oppose Huffman's bill.

The tribe, which has given millions of dollars to the Windsor school and fire districts to offset the impacts from its planned housing project, is negotiating with the town of Windsor to get water and sewer service. Such an agreement would have to be approved by Windsor voters because the tribal housing project is outside the town's urban growth boundary. In exchange, the tribe would build a 30-meter-long pool, which could be used by the Windsor High School swim team, a second pool for recreational use, restrooms, a changing facility, a community building, and parking, near the High School and the town center.
