= Guideville Band of Pomo Indians =

Pomo Native American tribe

The Guideville Band of Pomo Indians is a Native American tribe of the Pomo Indians of northern California.

== History ==
The tribe's origin is of the original settlers of areas in Mendocino, Lake, and Sonoma counties.

The tribe currently has 122 members.

Other bands of Pomo include the Lytton Band of Pomo Indians and the Scotts Valley Band of Pomo Indians.

== Point Molate Casino Project ==
In the 2000s, the tribe unsuccessfully attempted to build a Las Vegas-style casino at Point Molate in Contra Costa County.
