= Point Molate Naval Fuel Depot =

Navy fueling station in Richmond, California, U.S.

Coordinates: 37.94861°N 122.41361°W

- Richmond, California
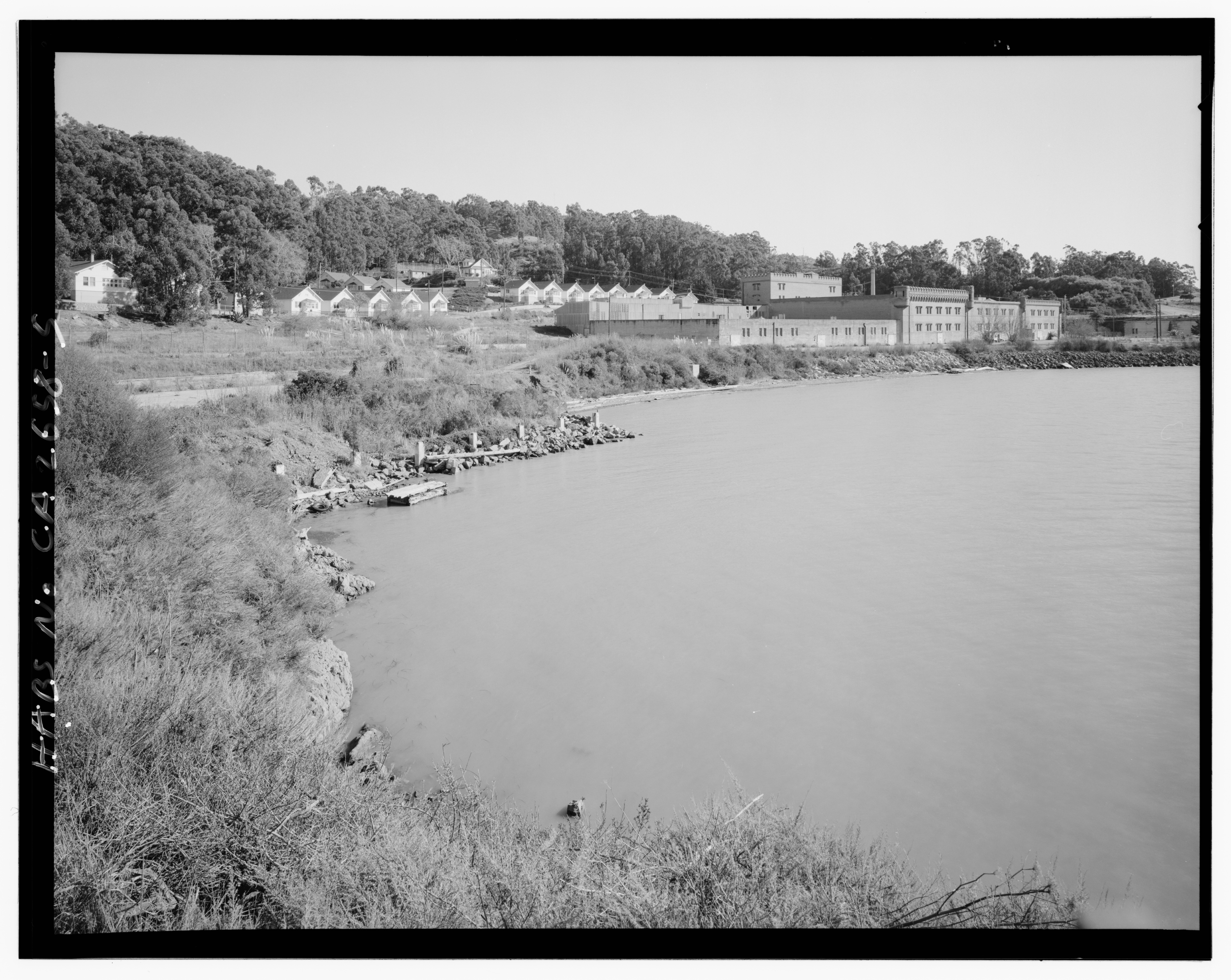
- Point Molate Naval Fuel Depot and East Bay shoreline.

Site information
- Type: Fuel depot
- Controlled by: United States Navy

Site history
- Built: 1941
- In use: 1941-1998

Point Molate Naval Fuel Depot is a decommissioned United States Navy fueling station on the western shore of Richmond, California on San Francisco Bay. It has undergone years of litigation and debate as to its redevelopment with proposals ranging from a billion dollar casino project, parkland, housing, and other mixed uses.

== History ==
For centuries the Ohlone people fished at this location, later in the late 1800s it was the site of a Chinese shrimp camp.

The depot opened in 1941 on the site of a former winery and shrimp camp and was closed during the Clinton-era base closures and realignments in 1995 and operationally on September 30, 1998. Part of the former naval base, the housing village Winehaven is now on the National Register of Historic Places. Other portions are under redevelopment plans by the city. A portion of the beach has been turned into Point Molate Beach Park.

== Redevelopment ==
=== Casino proposal ===
In 2004, the Guideville Band of Pomo Indians attempted to build a $US 1.6 billion Las Vegas-style casino development at Point Molate. The project was called illegal by California Governor Arnold Schwarzenegger and was opposed by both US Senators Barbara Boxer and Dianne Feinstein in addition to Contra Costa County officials and various environmental organizations. In 2010 the electorate of the city of Richmond voted on measure U, an advisory measure, and rejected the casino proposal.

In 2010 the tribe and Upstream sued the city for $US 750 million in damages, challenging the city council rejecting the proposed casino based on measure U. Eight years later judge Yvonne Gonzales Rogers rejected the suit and further ruled the profits be split in half between the developer and the city.

Also in 2018 a last ditch effort to operate a floating casino out of the Point Molate pier was struck down by the council.

=== Housing development ===
On April 23, 2019, the Richmond City Council approved a resolution for the City and Winehaven Legacy LLC, a subsidiary of developer SunCal, to enter into an Exclusive Right to Negotiate Agreement (ERN) regarding the terms and conditions for the disposition and development of 270 acres within the Point Molate property. During the ERN period, the city and the developer will develop a Disposition and Development Agreement (DDA) that will define the project, address all key terms and describe the transfer and sale of the property. The mixed-use project components described in the ERN are contemplated in general to include: Commercial retail space; Office space; Community lawn and kayaking center, and a long-term plan for the pier; Shoreline park, open space areas and trail; Preservation and adaptive reuse of the Winehaven Historic District buildings; Residential space (estimated to be approximately 1,200 residential units; the actual number may differ and will be determined through the entitlement process; Preservation/adaptive reuse of Winehaven Historic District; improved public waterfront access; beach park, open space, and Bay Trail enhancement with pedestrian/bike-friendly design; and meet the city's public art, local hire and living wage requirements. The eventual DDA would commit the developer to provide at least 67 affordable units on-site. Any additional affordability requirements would be satisfied by on-site units or in-lieu fees under the city's Inclusionary Housing Ordinance.

If the property is actually sold to the developer, the profits will be shared with the Guideville tribe and Upstream, the company that was to build the casino project voted down by the city. Plans by other developers not chosen by the council included 670 to 2,200 apartments by Orton Development, while a joint proposal by Cal-Coast Companies and Mar Ventures proposed similar housing options, in addition to a 150-room hotel and converting the former naval quarters at the village of Winehaven food hall/brewery, similar to the San Francisco Ferry Building or Emeryville Public Market. Lastly, Samuelson Schafer proposed a mix of housing including apartments, condominiums, row houses, a retirement community, beach and retail. Also under the agreement 70% of the site must be maintained as parkland.
