= Winehaven, California =

- Winehaven
- U.S. National Register of Historic Places
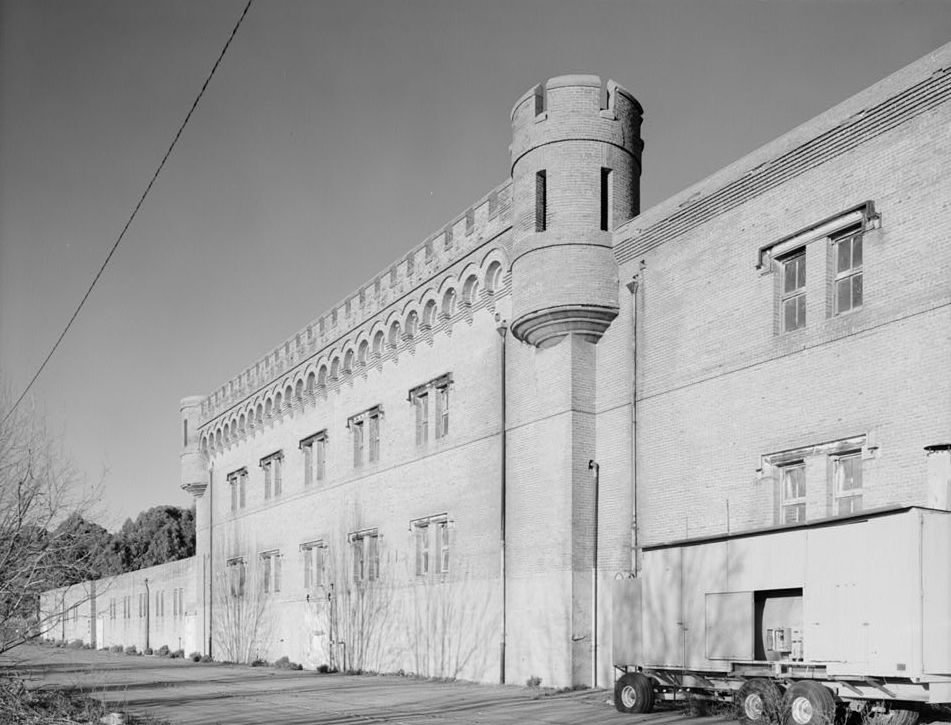
- Building 1 (storage cellar), Winehaven

- Location within San Francisco Bay Area Location within California Location within the United States
- Location: Both sides of Stenmark Dr. between Drowly Dr. and Grays Cir., Richmond, California, U.S.
- Coordinates: 37°57′04.7″N 122°25′02.8″W
- Built: 1907
- NRHP reference No.: 78000658; 100006694 (decrease)

Significant dates
- Added to NRHP: October 2, 1978
- Boundary decrease: November 15, 2021

Winehaven was a winery and town in Richmond, California, United States that held the title of "world's largest winery" for 12 years (1907–1919). It later became a fuel depot for the United States Navy.

After the 1906 San Francisco earthquake left that city in ruins, the California Wine Association moved to Point Molate, a promontory on the east shore of San Pablo Bay, and began construction of Winehaven. At the peak of the season, as many as 400 workers lived here, as all of the California Wine Association's shipments to foreign, coastal and New York markets sailed from the Winehaven dock—shipment capacity was 500,000 U.S. gallons (1,900,000 liters) a month, and 40 ships sailed annually for New York alone. The winery was shut down by Prohibition in 1919, and the company sold off its assets to avoid bankruptcy. Winehaven went mostly unused from about 1920 until the late 1930s.

A post office operated at Winehaven from 1910 to 1925.

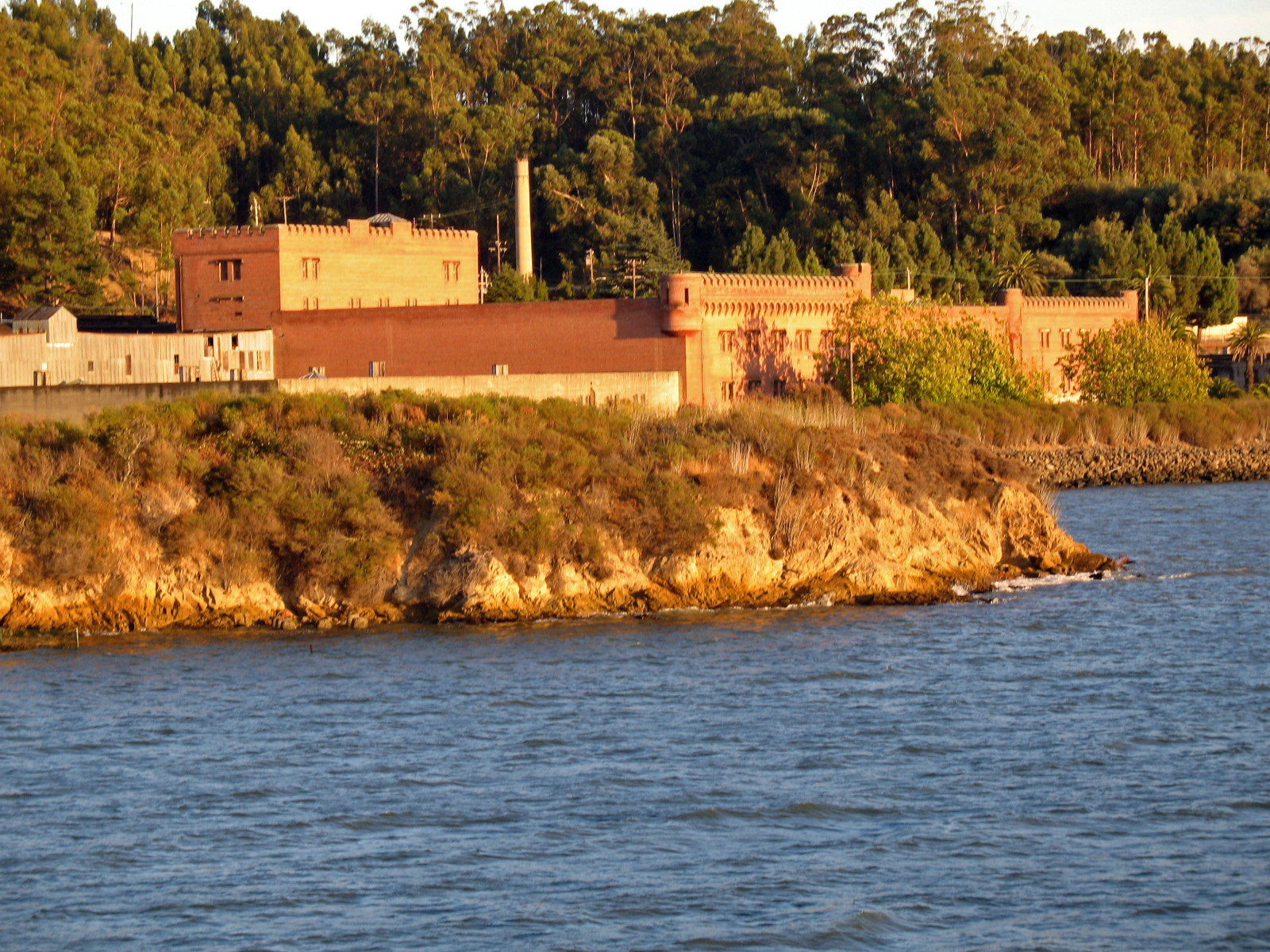
Winehaven today

The Navy bought the 412 acres (167 ha) site in 1941, moved into the winery buildings, and constructed 20 large concrete tanks on the hillsides above for a fuel depot. Thousands of drums of fuel were stored in huge buildings, pipelines were laid, a new pier was built and the old one was eventually removed. The old Winehaven Hotel was pressed into service for a period as barracks and mess hall, and the workers' houses were renovated for the use of naval personnel. The Commanding Officer of the Naval Fuel Depot was assigned the largest house on the bluff overlooking the others, which previously had been the home of the winery superintendent.

Despite the switch from wine to fuel, the historic district remains virtually unaltered from its days as a winery. There are 35 buildings in the National Register historic district built between 1907 and 1919, the most notable being the castle-like Winehaven Building adorned with crenellated parapet and corner turrets. Also located within the district is the Winemaster's House (Building 60), which became the Commanding Officer's residence, and the Village of Point Molate, a row of turn-of-the-century cottages used to house Winehaven and military families. The Navy continued to operate the fuel depot during the Korean War and Vietnam War until it was decommissioned in 1995.

== See also ==
- Point Molate Naval Fuel Depot
- National Register of Historic Places listings in Contra Costa County, California
