= African American mayors in California =

The following is a list of current and former African American mayors in the State of California. Since Edward P. Duplex was elected in 1888 as mayor of Wheatland, California, numerous African Americans have been elected or appointed to the post of mayor in California.

== Antioch ==
Population (2020): 115,921

Image	Mayor	Years	Notes
	Wade Harper	2012–2016	First African-American mayor of Antioch
	Lamar Thorpe	2020–Present	

== Berkeley ==
Population (2020): 124,321

Image	Mayor	Years	Notes
	Warren Widener	1971–1979	First African-American mayor of Berkeley
	Gus Newport	1979–1986	

== Carson ==
Population (2020): 95,558

Image	Mayor	Years	Notes
	Gilbert D. Smith	1970–1971; 1974–1975	First African-American mayor of Carson
	Clarence A. Bridgers	1975–1976; 1980–1981	
	Thomas G. Mills	1982–1986	
	Daryl W. Sweeney	2001–2003	
	Lula Davis-Holmes	2020–Present	

== Cerritos ==
Population (2020): 49,578

Image	Mayor	Years	Notes
	Alex H. Beanum	1981–1982	

== Compton ==
Population (2020): 95,740

Image	Mayor	Years	Notes
	Douglas Dollarhide	1969–1973	First African-American American mayor of Compton
	Doris A. Davis	1973–1977	
	Lionel Cade	1977–1981	
	Walter R. Tucker Jr.	1981–1993	
	Walter R. Tucker III	1993–1995	
	Omar Bradley	1993–2001	
	Eric J. Perrodin	2001–2013	
	Aja Brown	2013–2021	
	Emma Sharif	2021–Present	

== Cotati ==
Population (2020): 7,584

Image	Mayor	Years	Notes
	Robert Coleman-Senghor	2010–2011	First African-American mayor of Cotati

== East Palo Alto ==
Population (2020): 30,034

Image	Mayor	Years	Notes
	Barbara Mouton	1983–1986	First African American mayor of East Palo Alto
	James E. Blakey Jr.	May 1, 1987 – 1988	
	John Bostic	1988–1989	
	William Vines	1989–1990	
	Warnell Coats	1991	
	Pat Johnson	1992	
	Sharifa Wilson	1992–1995; 1999–2000	
	Rose Jacobs Gibson	1995–1997	
	R.B. Jones	1997–1998	
	Myrtle Walker	2001	
	Patricia Foster	2003; 2008	
	Donna Rutherford	2004; 2016	
	David E. Woods	2005; 2007; 2010	
	Lisa Yarbrough-Gauthier	2015; 2019; 2023	
	Larry Moody	2017	
	Regina Wallace-Jones	2020	

== El Centro ==
Population (2020): 44,322

Image	Mayor	Years	Notes
	DuBois McGee	1966–1972	First African-American mayor of El Centro

== Emeryville ==
Population (2020): 12,905

Image	Mayor	Years	Notes
	Courtney Welch	2023–2024	First African-American mayor of Emeryville

== Fontana ==
Population (2020): 212,704

Image	Mayor	Years	Notes
	Acquanetta Warren	2010–Present	First female and African-American mayor of Fontana

== Hawthorne ==
Population (2020): 88,083

Image	Mayor	Years	Notes
	Chris Brown	2013–2015	First African-American mayor of Hawthorne

== Hercules ==
Population (2020):

Image	Mayor	Years	Notes
	Dion Bailey	2013–2015	First African-American mayor of Hercules

== Inglewood ==
Population (2020): 107,762

Image	Mayor	Years	Notes
	Edward Vincent Jr.	1983–1997	First African-American Mayor of Inglewood
	Roosevelt F. Dorn	1997–2010	
	Danny Tabor	2010–2011	
	James T. Butts Jr.	2011–Present	

== Lake Elsinore ==
Population (2020): 70,265

Image	Mayor	Years	Notes
	Thomas R. Yarborough	1966–1968	First African-American mayor

== Lakewood ==
Population (2020): 82,496

Image	Mayor	Years	Notes
	Cassandra Chase	2025–Present	First African-American mayor of Lakewood

== Lemon Grove ==
Population (2020): 27,627

Image	Mayor	Years	Notes
	Racquel Vasquez	2016–2020	First African-American female mayor in San Diego County

== Long Beach ==
Population (2020): 466,742

Image	Mayor	Years	Notes
	Rex Richardson	2022–Present	First African-American mayor of Long Beach, California

== Lynwood ==
Population (2020): 67,265

Image	Mayor	Years	Notes
	Robert Henning	1985–1986; 1991–1992	First African-American mayor of Lynwood
	Evelyn Wells	1986; 1989–1990	
	Paul Richards	1986–2003	
	Louis Byrd	1999–2000; 2006–2007	

== Los Angeles ==
Population (2020): 3,898,747

Image	Mayor	Years	Notes
	Tom Bradley	1973–1993	First African-American mayor of Los Angeles
	Karen Bass	2022–Present	First female African-American mayor of Los Angeles; 2nd African-American mayor

== Menlo Park ==
Population (2020): 33,780

Image	Mayor	Years	Notes
	Billy Ray White	1980–1981; 1982–1983; 1985–1986	First African-American mayor of Menlo Park
	Cecilia Taylor	2019–2020	
	Drew Combs	2020–2021	

== Milpitas ==
Population (2020): 80,273

Image	Mayor	Years	Notes
	Ben F. Gross	1966–1968	First African-American mayor of Milpitas

== Oakland ==
Population (2020): 440,646

Image	Mayor	Years	Notes
	Lionel Wilson	1979–1993	First African-American mayor of Oakland
	Elihu Harris	1993–1999	
	Ron Dellums	2007–2011	Previously served on the city council of nearby Berkeley
	Kevin Jenkins	January 6, 2025 – May 20, 2025	Acting mayor
	Barbara Lee	May 20, 2025 – Present	

== Oceanside ==
Population (2020): 174,068

Image	Mayor	Years	Notes
	Terry Johnson	2000–2004	First African-American mayor of Oceanside

== Palm Springs ==
Population (2020): 44,575

Image	Mayor	Years	Notes
	Ron Oden	2003–2007	First African-American mayor of Palm Springs

== Pasadena ==
Population (2020): 138,699

Image	Mayor	Years	Notes
	Loretta Thompson-Glickman	1982–1984	First African-American mayor of Pasadena
	Chris Holden	1997–1999	

== Rialto ==
Population (2020): 104,026

Image	Mayor	Years	Notes
	Deborah Robertson	2012–2024	First African-American mayor of Rialto, California

== Richmond ==
Population (2020): 116,448

Image	Mayor	Years	Notes
	George D. Carroll	1964–1965	First African-American mayor of Richmond
	George Livingston	1969–1970; 1985–1993	First elected African-American mayor of Richmond
	Nat Bates	1971–1972; 1976–1977	
	Booker T. Anderson	1973–1974	
	Lonnie Washington	1978–1979	
	George Livingston	1985–1989*; 1989–1993	First elected African-American mayor of Richmond *appointed in 1985 to finish Thomas Corcoran's term. Won election in 1989 becoming Richmond's first elected African-American mayor
	Irma Anderson	2001–2006	First elected African-American female mayor of Richmond

== Sacramento ==
Population (2020): 524,943

Image	Mayor	Years	Notes
	Kevin Johnson	2008–2016	First African-American mayor of Sacramento
	Kevin McCarty	2025–present	First Biracial mayor of Sacramento

== Santa Monica ==
Population (2020): 93,076

Image	Mayor	Years	Notes
	Nat Trives	1975–1977	First African-American mayor of Santa Monica

== Santa Rosa ==
Population (2020): 178,127

Image	Mayor	Years	Notes
	Natalie Rogers	2022	First African-American mayor of Santa Rosa

== San Francisco ==
Population (2020): 873,965

Image	Mayor	Years	Notes
	Willie Brown	1996–2004	First African-American mayor of San Francisco
	London Breed	2017–2018	First African-American woman mayor of San Francisco

== San Ramon ==
Population (2020): 84,605

Image	Mayor	Years	Notes
	H. Abram Wilson	2002–2008	First African-American mayor of San Ramon

== Seaside ==
Population (2020): 32,366

Image	Mayor	Years	Notes
	Oscar Lawson	1976–1978	First African-American mayor of Seaside
	Stephen E. Ross	1978–1980	
	Lancelot McClair	1982–1994	
	Don R. Jordan	1994–1998	
	Jerry C. Smith	1998–2004	
	Ian Oglesby	2018–Present	

== Stockton ==
Population (2020): 320,804

Image	Mayor	Years	Notes
	Michael Tubbs	2017–2021	First African-American mayor of Stockton
	Kevin Lincoln	2021–2025	

== Thousand Oaks ==
Population (2020): 126,966

Image	Mayor	Years	Notes
	Lawrence E. Horner	1976–1977; 1981–1982; 1984–1885; 1988–1989	

== Tracy ==
Population (2020): 93,000

Image	Mayor	Years	Notes
	Nancy Young	2020–2024	

== Wheatland ==
Population (2020): 3,712

Image	Mayor	Years	Notes
	Edward P. Duplex	1888	First African American mayor in the state of California
