= Thomas Yarborough =

American politician and civic leader (1895–1969)

- c. 1948

Mayor of Elsinore, California
- In office 1966–1968

City Councilman of Elsinore, California
- In office 1948–1952, 1959–1966

Personal details
- Born: July 23, 1895 Dermott, Arkansas, U.S.
- Died: March 19, 1969 (aged 73) Riverside County, California, U.S.
- Occupation: Real estate operator Civic leader

Thomas R. Yarborough (July 23, 1895 – March 19, 1969) was an American civic leader and politician. In 1948, he became the first African American elected to a California city council. In 1966, Yarborough became the first African American mayor of Lake Elsinore, California, and one of three African Americans to be elected mayor that year in California. (Note: Although he is often referred to as the "first African American mayor in California", Thomas R. Yarborough was actually one of three African American mayors elected in California in 1966. The other two mayors were Dubois McGee of El Centro and Ben F. Gross of Milpitas. George Carroll was elected mayor of Richmond, California, in 1964. The first Black mayor elected in California was Edward P. Duplex in 1888.)

== Early life and education ==
T. R. Yarborough was born in Dermott, Arkansas, on July 23, 1895. His parents were William and Alice Yarborough (née Otis). He moved with his family to Greenville, Mississippi, where he received a public school education, and studied at Straight University, a historically black college in New Orleans, from 1911 to 1912. Due to economic hardship, Yarborough dropped out of school to earn a living, working as a bricklayer, janitor, and chauffeur. In 1916, he married Kathryn Stewart, a graduate of Oberlin College in Ohio. The Yarboroughs first moved to Los Angeles, California, in 1919.

== Business career ==
In 1924, Yarborough worked as a caretaker for the author Harold Bell Wright in Tucson, Arizona. In 1926, he moved back to Los Angeles, where he learned to upholster furniture at night while working at a furniture factory.

Thomas and Kathryn Yarborough became "year-round residents" in the small town of Lake Elsinore in Riverside County, California, in 1929. Thomas had first visited Lake Elsinore, known for its dry climate and mineral springs, for relief from asthma, after doctors gave him only one year to live.

From 1929 to 1934, Yarborough was a caretaker and handyman for the estate of the evangelist Aimee Semple McPherson. During his tenure, he worked with building contractors and interior decorators on the construction of her "castle" in Lake Elsinore, and built the distinctive dome over the entrance to her home.

Yarborough eventually opened his own upholstery business. He also invested in real estate, buying land at tax sales in Riverside County, which he later sold or developed as rental properties. He managed year-round and vacation rentals as part of his property management business.

== Civic and political career ==
In 1947, Yarborough founded the Elsinore Progressive League, which later became known as the Hilltop Community Center. He bought the former barracks of March Air Force Base, and turned it into a community center with social and cultural activities which were open to all, regardless of skin color.

In the late 1940s, Yarborough was appointed to the Elsinore Planning Commission, and served on the board of directors of the local Chamber of Commerce, as well as the executive board of the Property Owners Association. As a civic leader, he helped to establish a businessmen's association inclusive of all community groups, and was an active supporter of the NAACP, traveling to Los Angeles for meetings.

=== City council ===
In 1948, Yarborough successfully ran for a seat on the Lake Elsinore City Council, becoming the first African American city councilman in California. He had been persuaded to enter politics by Leon H. Washington Jr., publisher of the Los Angeles Sentinel, an influential African American newspaper.

Yarborough's defeat of the incumbent was significant as the population of Lake Elsinore was less than 9 percent Black at the time. His electoral success was due to his broad base of support from voters across all racial and ethnic backgrounds. Over the course of his career, Yarborough sought to unite the entire community, working not only with African Americans, but also in support of the Jewish and Latino communities, reaching out to white residents to broker change.

The town of Lake Elsinore had historically been heavily segregated since the 1900s. The Black, Jewish and Mexican American communities lived in segregated neighborhoods on the hill, while white families lived in the "choicest homes" at the very top. In 1948, Yarborough told Ebony magazine that desegregation finally started when Douglas Aircraft acquired the only factory in town, providing equal opportunities for employment. As the African American and Jewish communities in Elsinore began to grow, they encountered a few establishments on Main Street which refused to serve them. Yarborough reached out to Jewish community leaders to fight discrimination, and together, they were successful in ensuring that anyone could enjoy a drink or meal anywhere in Lake Elsinore.

He was defeated when he ran again in 1956, but three years later was appointed to fill a vacancy. Yarborough was reelected in 1960 and 1964. He served as a member of the Lake Elsinore City Council for a total of eleven years.

=== Mayor ===
In 1966, Yarborough was elected mayor of Lake Elsinore by his fellow city council members. At the time, he was one of three African American mayors elected to office in California. The other two African-Americans who became mayor in predominantly white communities that year were Dubois McGee of El Centro and Ben F. Gross of Milpitas.

During his political career in Lake Elsinore, Yarborough negotiated with the local utilities – including phone, gas, and electricity providers – to expand hiring and training programs for local youths.

=== Retirement and honors ===
Yarborough retired in 1968 to focus on writing a book about healing the country's racial problems. When he retired, the Thomas R. Yarborough Park was named in his honor. During the dedication ceremony in May 1968, letters of commendation and telegrams were read from Vice President Hubert Humphrey, California Governor Ronald Reagan, Senator Robert F. Kennedy, and many others. The San Francisco Examiner reported that the dedication ceremony emphasized Yarborough's plea "to the people of the USA to lay aside their prejudices and hate and join with the minorities to help establish freedom and first-class citizenship for all men regardless of race or color ... in conformity with the constitution of this great Nation."

== Death and legacy ==
Yarborough died in an automobile accident on Highway 71 in Riverside County on March 19, 1969.

In 1990, a plaque honoring Thomas Yarborough was dedicated in Yarborough Park, donated by the Hilltop Community Center. Around the year 2000, the local NAACP chapter started hosting an annual Juneteenth celebration in Yarborough Park.

== See also ==
- List of first African-American mayors
- African American mayors in California
- George Carroll (judge)
- Edward P. Duplex

== Notes ==
Preceded by Unknown	Mayor of Lake Elsinore, California; 1966—1968	Succeeded by Norman Chaffin
