= Los Angeles Board of Police Commissioners =

Civilian body overseeing the LAPD

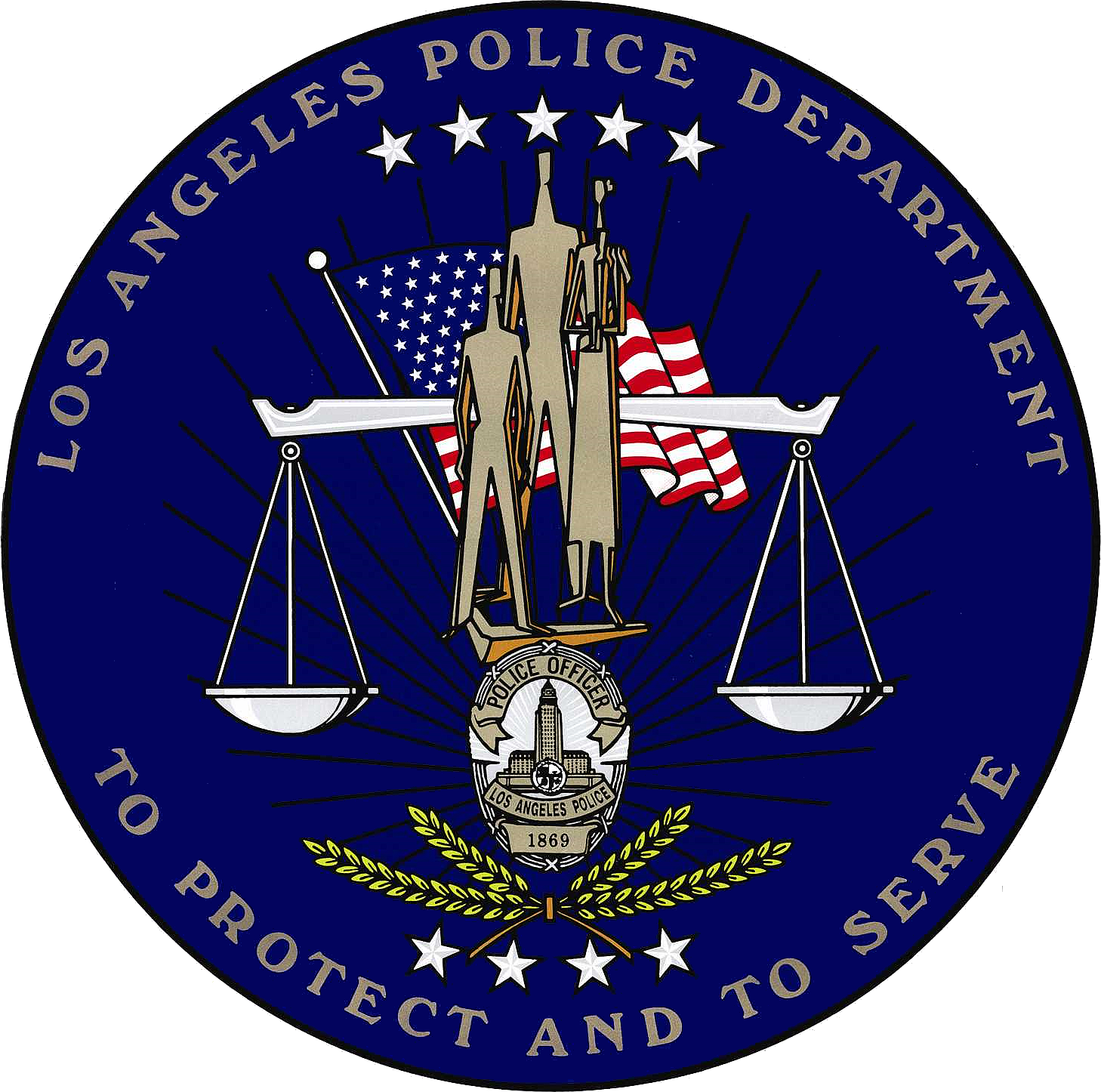
- Los Angeles Police Department logo
- Formation: 1920
- Type: Civilian oversight board
- Headquarters: 100 West 1st Street; Los Angeles, California, U.S.
- Region served: Los Angeles, California, U.S.
- President: Rasha Gerges Shields
- Vice President: Danny Tabor
- Website: Los Angeles Board of Police Commissioners

The Los Angeles Board of Police Commissioners, also commonly known as the Los Angeles Police Commission, is a five-member body of civilian-only, appointed officials which oversees the Los Angeles Police Department.

== Organization ==
The board is made up of five members who are appointed by the mayor and confirmed by the City Council. Each member serves a five-year term with a maximum of two terms.

The Los Angeles Police Commission also includes the Office of the Executive Director, Office of the Inspector General, Commission Investigation Division, and the Police Permit Review Panel.

== Members ==
- Rasha Gerges Shields, president, former federal prosecutor
- Danny Tabor, vice president, former mayor of Inglewood
- Fabian Garcia, commissioner, director of government relations at Homeboy Industries
- Jeff K. Skobin, commissioner, chief marketing officer and vice president of business operations at Galpin Motors
- Heather Aubry, commissioner, former assistant city attorney of Los Angeles

== Responsibilities ==
The Board of Police Commissioners is the collective head of the Los Angeles Police Department. It sets the overall policy while the Chief of Police manages the daily operations of the department and implements the board's policies and goals. The board meets every Tuesday in a public hearing room at police headquarters where the public may comment on the matters at hand as well as address the board directly.
