= Sweet Vengeance =

Sweet Vengeance may refer to:

- Sweet Vengeance (album), 2003 album by Nightrage
- Sweetwater (2013 film), also known as Sweet Vengeance
- Sweet Vengeance mine, California
