= George Livingston =

American politician (c. 1933–2012)

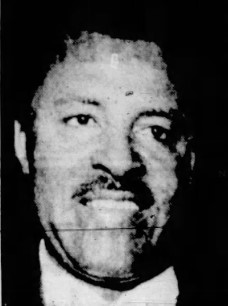

Mayor of Richmond, California
- In office 1985–1993
- Preceded by: Thomas Corcoran
- Succeeded by: Rosemary Corbin
- In office 1969–1970
- Preceded by: J.J. Sheridan
- Succeeded by: Donald Wagerman

Personal details
- Born: George Livingston c. 1933
- Died: January 7, 2012

George Livingston (c. 1933 – January 7, 2012) was an American politician who served as the first elected African American Mayor of Richmond, California, from 1985 to 1993. Livingston was appointed Mayor in 1985 by the city council. He won election as Richmond's first elected African American mayor in 1989 for a full term.

== Biography ==
=== Early life ===
Livingston was born and raised in rural Oklahoma. In 1952, he moved with his family to Richmond, California, where members of his family found employment in the East Bay shipyards.

Livingston graduated from Berkeley High School in Berkeley, California. He received his bachelor's degree in political science from Antioch University, which had a now defunct satellite campus in neighboring San Francisco. Livingston said that his interest in politics began in the early 1960s, when he met Martin Luther King Jr. at a speech at Contra Costa College.

Livingston earliest jobs included positions at the Mare Island Naval Shipyard. and at Continental Paper Co. in Richmond as a Salesman. He later worked in the regulatory department of the Pacific Gas and Electric Company for the majority of his nonpolitical career.

=== Political career ===
Before entering local politics, Livingston became active in neighborhood and church groups.

Livingston was first elected to the Richmond City Council in 1965, becoming the second African American ever elected to the council (The first was George Carroll). Livingston served three consecutive terms beginning in 1965, before leaving office. In 1973, Livingston was elected again to the city council, where he remained until his appointment to the mayor's office in 1985.

=== Mayor ===
The position of Mayor rotated between city council members until 1981, when it became a popularly elected office. Thomas Corcoran was elected the first elected mayor.

Richmond Mayor Tom Corcoran died in office in 1985. According to city law, the city council needed to choose Corcoran's successor from the sitting members of the council. The city council appointed Livingston, a member of the council, to serve out the remainder of Cochran's unexpired term. Contra Costa County Supervisor John Gioia explained the council's decision to appoint Livingston to the mayor's office, "They thought George would be the best person to unite the council and the communities in Richmond...If you look at his legacy, he really worked hard at trying to find common ground among City Council members."

In 1989, Livingston announced his candidacy for a full term as mayor. He won the 1989 mayoral election, becoming Richmond's first elected African American mayor. As mayor, Livingston oversaw the construction of the city's 23rd Street overpass and the early redevelopment of the Port of Richmond. Livingston was able to attract new offices and businesses to Richmond, including a U.S. Social Security office, a U.S. Postal Service bulk mail facility, and the Hilltop shopping center.

In 1993, Livingston was defeated for re-election by Rosemary Corbin.

George Livingston died from complications of diabetes at Doctors Hospital in San Pablo, California, on January 7, 2012, at the age of 78. He was survived by his wife, Eunice Livington; daughter, Grace Livingston-Nunley; and son, George Jr. U.S. Rep. George Miller (D-California) called Livingston "...a leader and also a coalition builder," saying, "He was able to work across the entire community. His goal was the development and growth of Richmond."

== See also ==
- List of first African-American mayors
- African American mayors in California
