= Chris Brown (California politician) =

American politician and businessman from California

Mayor Chris Brown
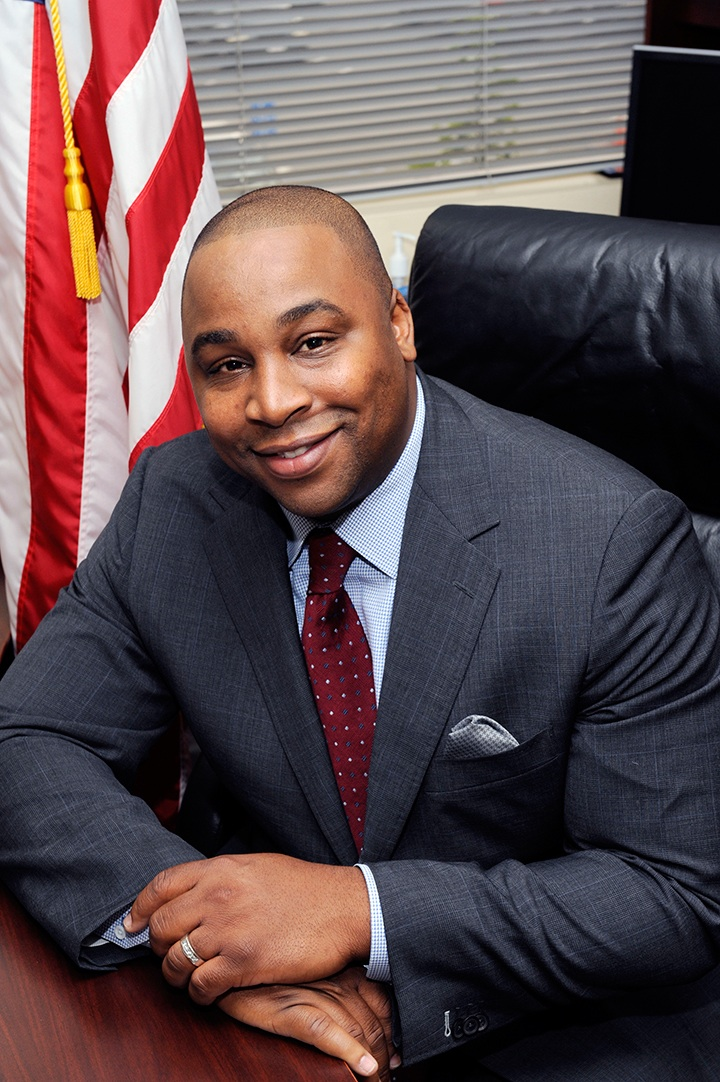

City of Hawthorne, Mayor
- In office December 5, 2013 – December 1, 2015
- Preceded by: Daniel Juarez
- Succeeded by: Alex Vargas

Personal details
- Born: July 17, 1981 (age 45) Los Angeles, California
- Party: Democratic
- Education: National University; Allied Schools (United States)
- Occupation: Politician / Entrepreneur
- Website: Campaign Website

Chris Brown is an American former politician in the State of California. On November 5, 2013, Brown became the youngest mayor of the City of Hawthorne and the first African American mayor in the city's 91-year history. Brown defeated incumbent Daniel "Danny" Juarez and Jose Gutierrez, winning 39.48 percent to 30.93 percent to 29.60 percent, respectively. He was defeated during his re-election campaign by Mayor Alex Vargas in a subsequent election.

In March 2014, Brown, in conjunction with Police Chief Bob Fager and the Hawthorne Police Officer Association, developed and adopted an action strategy to address fiscal and diversity concerns within the City of Hawthorne and its police force through Lateral Recruitment.

On May 6, 2014, Mayor Brown introduced an ordinance to increase the minimum hourly wage to a "living wage" for workers hired by City of Hawthorne contract services providers, following the stall of the Federal "Living Wage" increase proposed by President Barack Obama stalled in Congress. The National Conference of State Legislatures, notes this year 34 states have considered and are moving forward with legislation to impose higher minimum wages.

On August 17, 2014, via his Twitter account, Brown proposed establishing a mandate on all uniformed city officers to wear cameras while on duty. "I am simply not willing to gamble with a single life, or the wrongful accusation of upstanding officers," Brown noted.

On November 18, 2014, in an interview with ABC 7 News, Mayor Brown announced the comeback of the historic Hawthorne Plaza Mall as a new high-end outlet mall within two years. "The city has invested millions into increasing curb appeal of Hawthorne Blvd. to invite businesses that will provide much needed jobs," said the Mayor. The mall is estimated to increase city's yearly revenue by nearly 15%, between $6 and $8 million a year.

== Controversies ==
Since winning his first elected public office, Brown has twice faced eviction proceedings at city apartments and also racked up numerous personal debts for more than $8,000 worth of charter flights with Surf Air, campaign consulting services, and a nearly $20,000 loan from California Republic Bank. He was evicted by court order last November 2014 from an apartment for six months of unpaid rent. He argued that the building was in disrepair and said he refused to pay out of protest. He then again faced eviction proceedings in March 2015 for four months of nonpayment at his subsequent residence.

In April 2015, residents of Hawthorne began organizing an effort to force Brown to resign from office., Hawthorne residents began protesting City Council meetings over Chris Brown's excessive personal spending as Mayor, using taxpayer funds for lavish trips, meals, and hotel stays.

In August 2015, Brown reportedly bounced a $1000 check payable to the city to cover the cost of printing his candidate statement in ballot materials. The fee was to pay for an optional 200-word statement that would be printed in guides and sample ballots sent to voters.

== See also ==
- List of first African-American mayors
- African American mayors in California
