= Irma Anderson =

American politician (1931–2024)

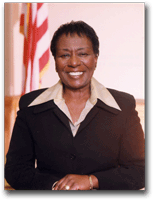

Mayor of Richmond, California
- In office 2001–2006
- Preceded by: Rosemary Corbin
- Succeeded by: Gayle McLaughlin

City Council of Richmond, California
- In office 1993–2000

Personal details
- Born: Irma Louise Husbands; January 18, 1931 Boston, Massachusetts, U.S.
- Died: January 28, 2024 (aged 93) Richmond, California, U.S.
- Party: Democratic
- Spouse: Rev. Booker T. Anderson Jr.
- Children: 2
- Education: University of California, Berkeley

Irma Louise Anderson (née Husbands; January 18, 1931 – January 28, 2024) was an American politician who was the elected mayor of the city of Richmond, California, serving between 2001 and 2006. She ran for re-election as the incumbent Democrat in the 2006 mayoral race and lost to Green Party challenger councilperson Gayle McLaughlin by 192 votes.

Before serving as mayor she was a member of the city council from 1993 through 2000. She was the first black woman to serve on the Richmond city council and arguably claimed to be the first African American woman elected mayor of a major California city (although Doris A. Davis served as mayor of slightly smaller Compton, California in 1973).

Anderson, born and raised in Boston, Massachusetts, was her high school class valedictorian. She earned both RN and BSN degrees from Cornell University. She also earned an MPH at the school of public health of University of California, Berkeley.

In 1954, Anderson came to Richmond, California, with her husband, the late Rev. Booker T. Anderson Jr. (who served as Mayor of Richmond from 1973 to 1974). The couple had two sons, Ahmad and Wilbert. Ahmad ran for Richmond City Council in 2020.

Her career changed from nursing to politics working for the Contra Costa County Health Department where she began as a nurse and advanced to Director of Public Health Nursing. As mayor, Anderson worked with the West Contra Costa Unified School District developing after-school programs throughout the city of Richmond.

Anderson died from pancreatic cancer at her home in Richmond, on January 28, 2024, at the age of 93.

== See also ==
- Gayle McLaughlin
- Rosemary Corbin
- Mayors of Richmond, California
- Politics of the United States
- List of first African-American mayors
- African American mayors in California
