= Robert Coleman-Senghor =

American professor of English

Mayor of Cotati, California
- In office January 9, 2010 – January 12, 2011

Personal details
- Born: November 8, 1940 Amite City, Louisiana
- Died: April 9, 2011 California
- Spouse: Gabi Schmitz
- Children: Kenya Senghor, Akai Senghor, Michael Gora-Senghor, Drew Jacoby-Senghor
- Education: University of San Francisco
- Profession: English professor
- Committees: Cotati Design Review Committee

Military service
- Branch/service: United States Marine Corps
- Years of service: 1958–1962

Robert Coleman-Senghor (November 8, 1940 – April 9, 2011) was an American professor of English at Sonoma State University who served as mayor of Cotati, California for one year. He died suddenly in the hospital from a blood clot (which two days earlier had caused a heart attack due to a torn aorta) entered his brain, causing hemorrhaging.

== Life, education, and career ==
Coleman-Senghor was born on November 8, 1940, in Amite City, Louisiana. His family moved to California soon after. He graduated from Berkeley High School. He joined the United States Marine Corps. After leaving the Marines, he attended University of California, Berkeley and later earned a master's degree from the University of San Francisco.

He met Gabi Schmitz while teaching at Sonoma State University. He married her in 1994, and had four sons.

Living in the Cotati area, he coached soccer and served as member of the local Parent-Teacher Association. He taught English as a Professor of California Cultural Studies at Sonoma State University.

His interest in politics led him to serve on the Cotati's Design Review Committee and Planning Commission. In 2008, there were three open seats on the City Council. Coleman-Senghor ran and got elected, getting 1,296 votes. He was elected vice-mayor in 2009 and mayor in 2010.

While teaching, Coleman-Senghor experienced sudden chest pains. He died two days later, on April 9, 2011.

== Legacy ==
On November 7, 2013, his widow unveiled a permanent memorial to Coleman-Senghor. The memorial is located in Cotati's Veterans Park near the intersection of Old Redwood Highway and East Cotati Avenue.

== See also ==
- List of mayors of Cotati, California
- List of first African-American mayors
- African American mayors in California
