= Santa Monica Police Department =

Law enforcement agency in California, U.S.

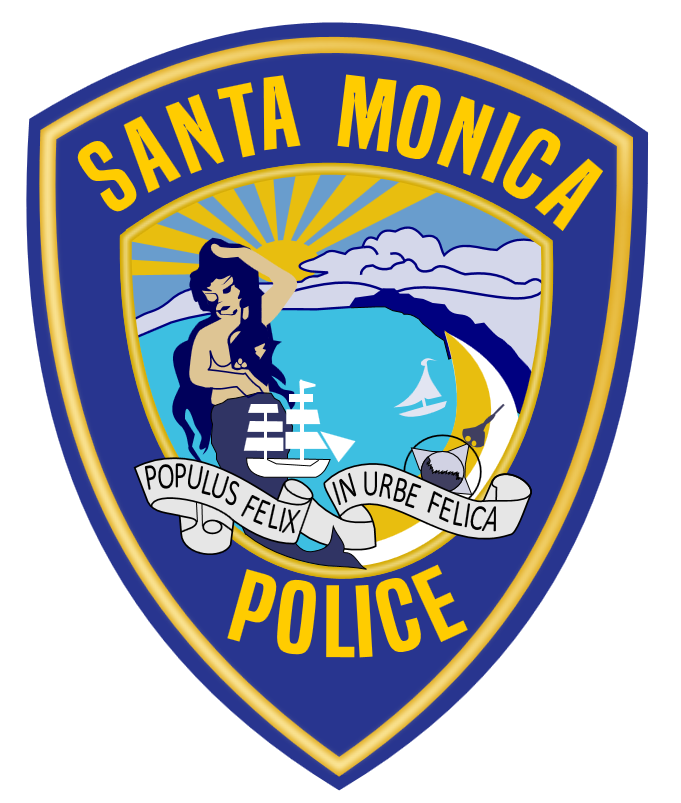
- Santa Monica Police patch
- Abbreviation: SMPD

Agency overview
- Formed: 1897
- Employees: 233 sworn (2024)
- Annual budget: $123 million (2025)

Jurisdictional structure
- Operations jurisdiction: Santa Monica, California, United States
- Legal jurisdiction: City of Santa Monica, California
- General nature: Local civilian police

Operational structure
- Headquarters: 333 Olympic Drive; Santa Monica, California

Facilities
- Beats: 4

Website
- santamonicapd.org

The Santa Monica Police Department (SMPD) is a law enforcement agency of the city of Santa Monica, California, United States.

== History ==
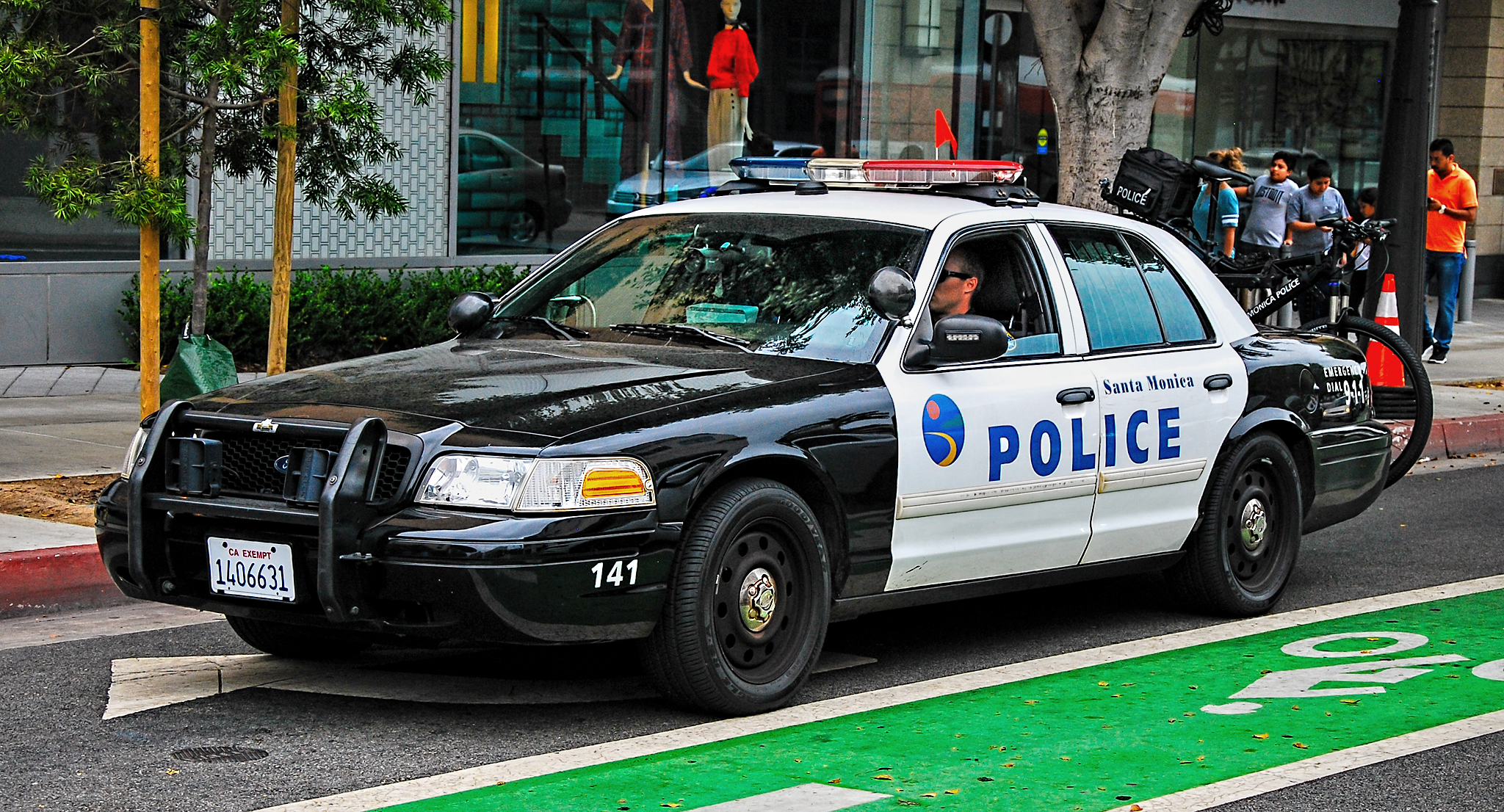
Santa Monica Police vehicle

The department was founded in May 1897. At the beginning of the twentieth century, public drunkenness was initially a major focus for the department. As the city of Santa Monica grew, a detective bureau was implemented, as well as a call box system that allowed for officers to be alerted faster. Illegal gambling operations in the city also were an issue during the Great Depression.

The police department operates a jail, which has a maximum capacity of 112 people, but is only allowed to confine each person for 48 hours at most. The Serial Inebriate Outreach Program tries to persuade people currently in the jail for drunkenness to seek treatment for alcoholism; the program has had a 25% success rate as of 2006.

Santa Monica named Jacqueline Seabrooks its first female police chief in April 2012. She assumed her new post in May 2012, succeeding Timothy J. Jackman, who retired.

== Salary ==
In 2013, the department was criticized for paying 28 of its staff more than 200,000 dollars per year. Police Chief Seabrooks claimed that high salaries were partially due to overtime paid by private events employing the officers. The department's total budget that year was 77 million dollars.

== Homelessness outreach ==
The police department has played a role in the city's efforts to reduce homelessness. As part of the Homeless Liaison Program, the department assigns a group of officers to coordinate with other agencies to provide housing to the homeless, instead of perpetuating an arrest-and-release cycle. From 2007 to 2009, the program reduced homelessness levels by 8%. Efforts by Santa Monica police to fine homeless persons have often proved ineffective, not only because people arrested for homelessness are unable to pay the fine, but also because landlords are unwilling to lease housing to people with arrest warrants for unpaid fines. The police will also call paramedics for homeless individuals in need of medical attention. Some homeless individuals have complained that the police do a poor job of keeping track of their confiscated possessions, such that they rarely receive their items back once released from jail; while others have asked the police to pay more attention to crimes committed by homeless offenders against homeless victims.

== Harbor Unit ==
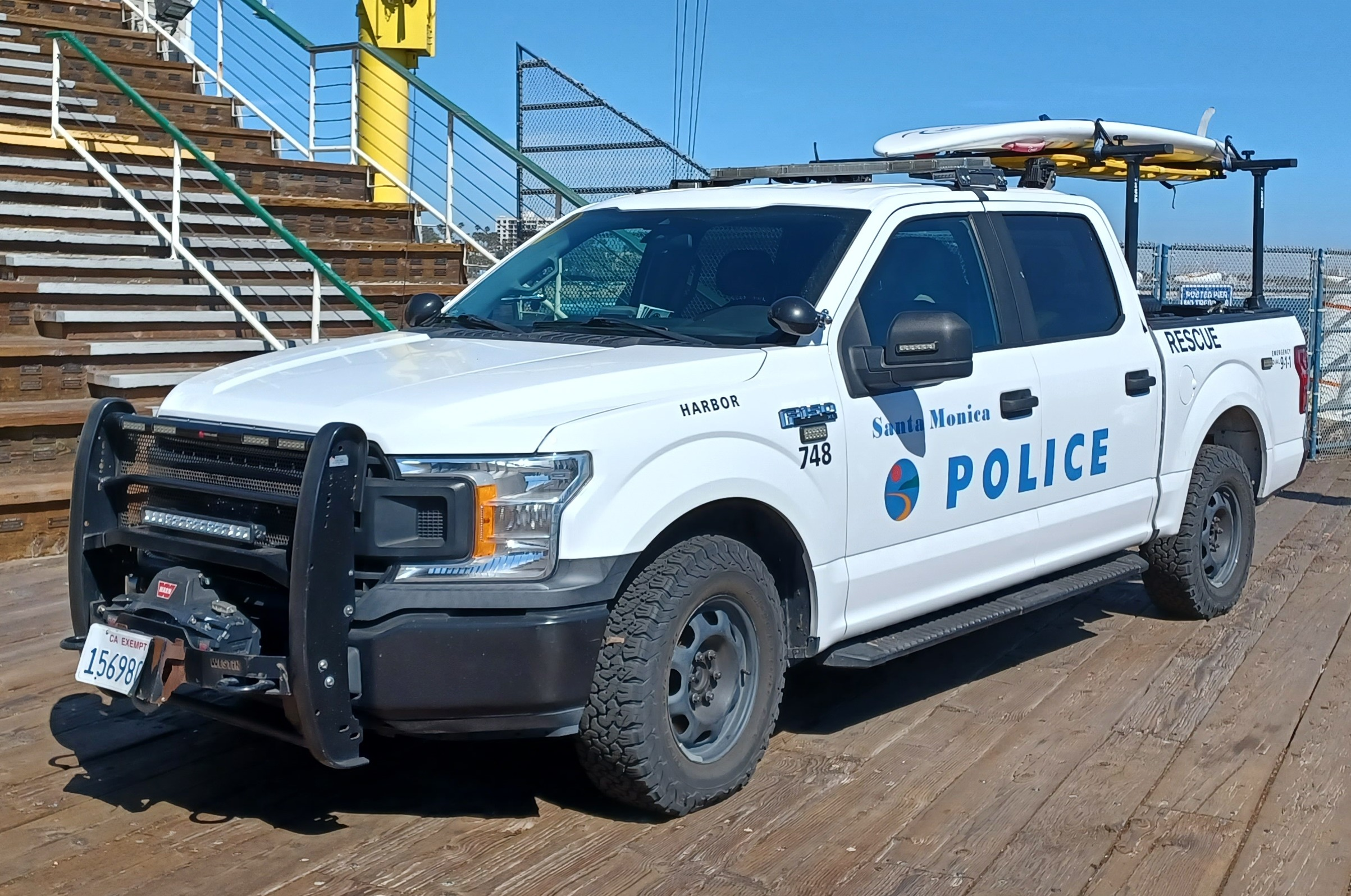
Harbor rescue police vehicle at Santa Monica Pier

The department's Harbor Unit performs ocean rescues at the Santa Monica Pier.

== Police Chiefs of the SMPD ==
- George B. Dexter (1896 – 1898)
- Max K. Barretto (1898 – 1911)
- Ellis E. Randall (1912 – 1915)
- Fred W. Ferguson (1916 – 1920)
- Clarence E. Webb (1921 – 1936)
- Charles L. Dice (1936 – 1939)
- Clarence E. Webb (1940 – 1945; second term)
- Stacy Schmidt (1945 – 1947)
- Joseph P. McClelland (1947 – 1950)
- James F. Keane (1979 – 1991)
- James T. Butts, Jr. (1991 – 2006)
- Timothy J. Jackman (2006 – 2012)
- Jacqueline Seabrooks (2012 – 2018)
- Cynthia Renaud (2018 – October 25, 2020)
- Jacqueline Seabrooks-Interim status (2020 – October 2021)
- Ramon Batista (October 18, 2021 – October 4, 2025)
- Darrick Jacob (2025 August – present)
