= Jose Esteves =

American politician

Jose S. Esteves
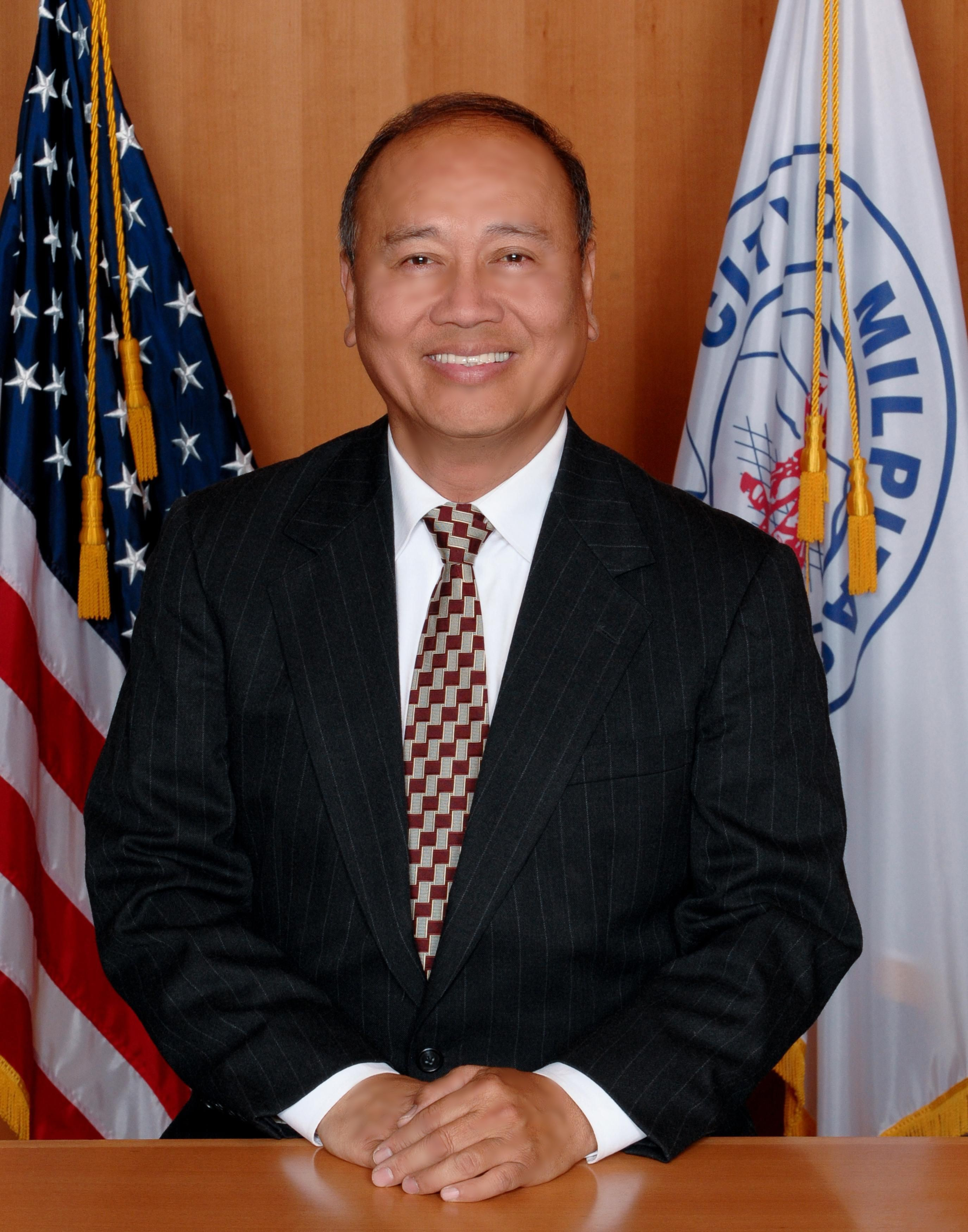
- Esteves in 2011

Mayor of Milpitas, California
- In office 3 December 2002 – 2 December 2008
- Preceded by: Henry Manayan
- Succeeded by: Robert Livengood
- In office 7 December 2010 – 13 December 2016
- Preceded by: Robert Livengood
- Succeeded by: Richard Tran

Member of Milpitas City Council
- In office 1998–2002

Personal details
- Born: 1947 (age 78–79) Dagupan, Pangasinan, Philippines
- Party: Republican
- Spouse: Susan Esteves

Jose "Joe" Santos Esteves (born 1947) is an American politician who served as mayor of Milpitas, California, from 2002 to 2008, and again from 2010 to 2016. A Republican, Esteves was born in the Philippines and graduated from the University of the Philippines Diliman before immigrating to the United States in 1980. Before becoming mayor, Esteves served on the Milpitas City Council from 1998 to 2002.

== Biography ==
Esteves was born and raised in Dagupan, Pangasinan, in the Philippines. Esteves graduated from the University of the Philippines Diliman with bachelor's degrees in civil engineering and industrial engineering and an MBA. While attending the University of the Philippines, he was a member of Epsilon Chi. In 1980, Esteves immigrated to the United States. Later he attended and graduated from UCLA Anderson School of Management, and the John F. Kennedy School of Government. He had worked for the Santa Clara County Superior Court as an Information Systems Specialists; retiring in 2013.

=== Political career ===
Before being elected to public office Esteves volunteered for the city and was a commission member; in 1998, Esteves was elected to the Milpitas City Council. He then became mayor in 2002; he went on to serve three consecutive terms, then left office for two years, and was elected to be mayor of Milpitas again in 2010. To serve one of those consecutive terms, he defeated former mayor Henry Manayan in 2006. Manayan, who was the first Filipino American mayor elected in the United States. Esteves unsuccessfully ran for a seat on the Santa Clara County Board of Supervisors in 2008, coming in last place (with about 27% of the vote) in the three-way primary.

In 2008, he began work on getting a mural about the farm labor movement added to the Milpitas Library, it was installed in October 2012. In 2012, he won his fifth term, receiving over seventy percent of the vote; then went on to win re-election two years later in a three way race. While in office, Milpitas overtook Daly City as having the largest concentration of Filipino Americans in Northern California. In 2013, Esteves was the only Filipino American mayor in the San Francisco Bay Area, and worked with other Filipino Americans to raise money for Typhoon Haiyan relief. That same year, to assist the city to remain solvent, elected Milpitas officials, including Esteves, reduced their salaries and ended their medical benefits.

In 2014, the city of Milpitas approved the construction of an Asian-themed mall modeled after the Pacific Mall, in Toronto; Esteves expressed his concern that while the proposed mall was in Milpitas its planned name did not mention Milpitas at all. That year Milpitas was a city whose population was majority Asian American, and fifteen percent Filipino American. Later that same year in 2014, seeking his sixth term as mayor, Esteves received the endorsement of Kansen Chu, Ro Khanna, the North American Punjabi Association, the Greater San Jose Hispanic Chamber of Commerce, and others.

Esteves has campaigned against the Newby Island landfill since at least 2014, calling for its closure. This is a polar opposite of what the landfill is planning, which is expansion of its capacity which would extend its closure date to 2041 instead of 2025 as is presently estimated. The following year, after a review of potential firms by the City Manager, a council member, and Esteves, Milipitas hired the firm Burke, Williams & Sorensen LLP to litigate on the city's behalf regarding the odor issues caused by the landfill. By 2016, the firm had received up to two hundred five thousand dollars for their efforts, and Milpitas stopped sending its trash to the landfill, instead contracting with Guadalupe Landfill in San Jose. In 2015, in response to developers of property around the planned Milpitas station for BART suing the city of Milpitas demanding a reduction of development impact fees, Esteves opposed allowing one developer to pay less impact fees than another developer, as it would create a bad precedent. That same year, he went on to approve an ordinance making 25 October Larry Itliong Day in Milpitas.

During the 2014 congressional campaign season, Esteves and a city council member from Cupertino filed a complaint against Mike Honda with the Office of Congressional Ethics. The complaint alleged that Honda's re-election campaign mixed governance and campaigning, a violation of House rules; the resulting investigation continued into 2016. In 2016, he could not run for mayor, having served the maximum number of consecutive terms that Milpitas city law allows. In that same year, he opposed a tax increase proposed by the Santa Clara Valley Transportation Authority, as he believed that "it doesn’t do anything for Milpitas.", instead supporting widening of California State Route 237; the tax was then placed on the 2016 ballot and passed. Additionally, Esteves endorsed Ro Khanna for the 17th congressional district; Khanna went on to defeat Mike Honda. He was succeeded by Milpitas' first Vietnamese American mayor Richard Tran. In mid-December 2016, Esteves ended his term.

=== Personal life ===
Esteves is married to Susan; they are parents to a daughter. He is a member of various organizations, including but not limited to Lions Club, Knights of Columbus, and the Rotary Club.
