= Marysville Cemetery =

Details
- Established: 1850
- Closed: 1983
- Location: Marysville, California
- Country: United States
- Coordinates: 39.162277°N 121.589169°W
- Type: City
- Owned by: Marysville Cemetery Commission
- Size: 14.5-acres
- No. of graves: approximately 10,000
- Find a Grave: Marysville Cemetery

Marysville Cemetery also known as Historic Marysville City Cemetery, is a no longer active city-owned cemetery that was established in 1850, and is located in Marysville, California. Historically this cemetery has been prone to flooding.

This cemetery is divided into many sections, including the Japanese, Chinese, Chileans, African American, Jewish, Babies’, Masonic, Odd Fellows, the Grand Army of the Republic, and a Potter's field for the indigent or unknown deceased.

== History ==
Marysville Cemetery was founded in 1850, and is 14.5-acres in size with nearly 10,000 burials. Most of the burial records between 1850 and 1870 were stolen by the former coroner, Ebenezer Hamilton as blackmail for a larger salary. The missing records were never found. The last body was buried in this cemetery was around 1983. Many burials for the Marysville-area are now held at Sierra View Memorial Park in Olivehurst, California.

In 1855, the Jewish portion of the cemetery is located in the southeast corner and was formed by the Marysville Hebrew Benevolent Society and their fundraising efforts through the 1860s. Many of the gravestones are in Hebrew and list the place of birth as either Prussia or Germany; the exception being the graves of children born in California.

The Chinese portion of the Marysville Cemetery was founded in 1862, and features funerary burners that are over 100 years old, similarly these were also found at the Chinese Cemetery in Auburn, California. The Chinese portion has a Victorian style brick oven created in 1889, for offerings.

In 2017, the cemetery was flooded after water from the Oroville Dam crisis, which submerged the graves underwater and causing some of the grave markers to collapse.

== Notable burials ==
Many survivors of the Donner Party can be found at this cemetery, including Charles Covillaud and Harriet Frances Murphy Nye.

- Black Bart (1829–1888), outlaw, Wells Fargo stagecoach robber noted for his poetic messages; it is unknown if this is his true grave.
- Edward Duplex (1830–1900), politician, civil rights activist, gold miner
- Henry Peter Haun (1815–1860), United States Senator.

== See also ==
- List of cemeteries in California
