= Edward Vincent Jr. =

American politician (1934–2012)

Edward Vincent
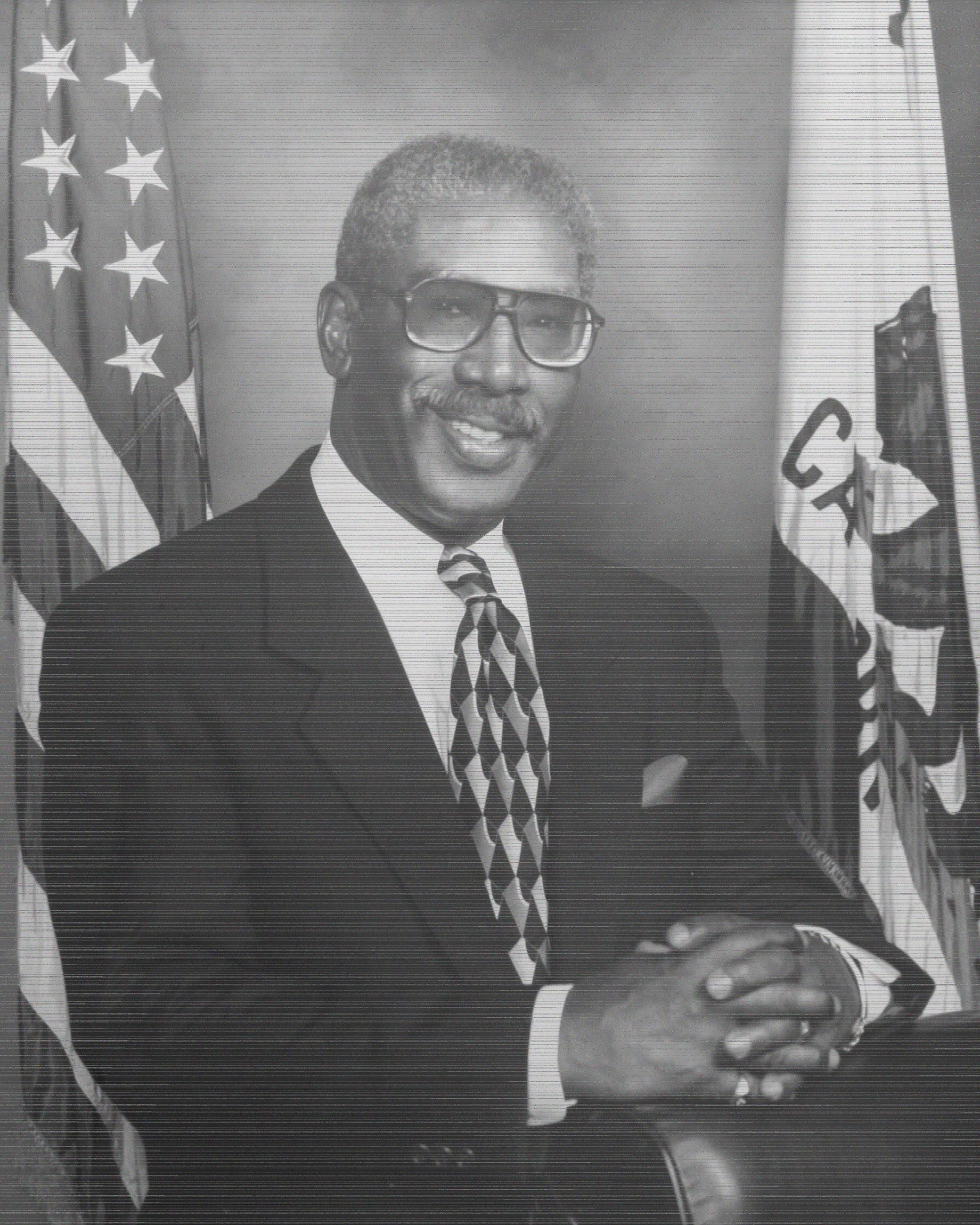

Member of the California Senate from the 25th district
- In office December 4, 2000 – November 4, 2008
- Preceded by: Teresa Patterson Hughes
- Succeeded by: Roderick Wright

Member of the California State Assembly from the 51st district
- In office December 2, 1996 – November 30, 2000
- Preceded by: Curtis R. Tucker Jr.
- Succeeded by: Jerome Horton

Mayor of Inglewood, California
- In office June 1983 – November 1996
- Preceded by: Lee Weinstein
- Succeeded by: Roosevelt F. Dorn

Personal details
- Born: June 23, 1934 Steubenville, Ohio, U.S.
- Died: August 31, 2012 (aged 78) Los Angeles, California, U.S.
- Party: Democratic
- Spouse: Marilyn
- Children: 2

Military service
- Branch/service: United States Army

Edward Vincent Jr. (June 23, 1934 – August 31, 2012) was an American politician who was elected to the California State Senate in November 2000, and represented the 25th Senatorial District until 2008, which included Compton, Gardena, Hawthorne, Inglewood, Lawndale, Lynwood, Los Angeles, Long Beach, San Pedro, and the Palos Verdes Peninsula. Vincent and his wife Marilyn lived in Inglewood from 1968. Together they had two daughters and three grandchildren. Vincent died on August 31, 2012.

== Life before politics ==
Born in Steubenville, Ohio, Vincent showed a love for sports and a desire to succeed. This helped him to gain an athletic scholarship to the University of Iowa in 1952. There, he majored in Public Relations and Advertising. Moreover, Vincent excelled on the football field, receiving All Big Ten and All-American honors. As the third draft choice of the 1956 Los Angeles Rams, Vincent played in several games before being sidelined by injuries.

While serving in the military, Vincent received all Army and all Service Football Team honors. After an honorable discharge from the U.S. Army in 1959, Vincent continued his education, earning a Bachelor of Arts degree in Corrections and Social Welfare from California State University, Los Angeles. He then embarked upon a 35-year career with the Los Angeles County Probation Department.

== Local politics ==
Vincent was elected to the Inglewood Unified School District's Board of Trustees, where he served as president from 1978 to 1979. Moreover, he represented the residents of District No. 4 on the Inglewood City Council from 1979 to 1983. In 1983, Vincent began his term as the first African-American mayor of the City of Inglewood and was re-elected for three additional terms. He was also commissioner of the State of California World Trade Commission.

== State Assembly ==
Vincent served as a member of the California State Assembly from 1996 to 2000, representing the 51st Assembly District. In the Assembly, he chaired the Elections, Reapportionment, and Constitutional Amendments Committee as well as the California Horse Racing Industry Committee. On October 24, 2000, Vincent received the Cuactemoc Award for outstanding public service on behalf of farm workers. The award was presented by La Cooperativa.

== State Senate ==
Between 2000 and 2008 Vincent served in the State Senate. He was a member of the Senate Committees on Agriculture, Governmental Organization, and Health. He also chaired the Select Committee on the Horseracing Industry. In this function, he authored legislation on gambling licenses, state teacher retirement benefits, horse racing, and community care facilities. He was forced to leave the Senate in 2008 due to term limits.

== See also ==
- List of first African-American mayors
- African American mayors in California
