= Rosemary Corbin =

American politician (1930/1931 – 2024)

Mayor of Richmond, California
- In office 1993–2001
- Preceded by: George Livingston
- Succeeded by: Irma Anderson

City Council of Richmond, California
- In office 1985–1993

Personal details
- Party: Democratic

Rosemary Corbin is a longstanding Democratic public figure and former mayor of Richmond, California.

== Overview ==
Corbin served on the Richmond City Council from 1985 to 1993, and then as the mayor from 1993 to 2001. In 1993, Corbin defeated incumbent Richmond Mayor George Livingston, who was seeking re-election.

Corbin was the first directly elected female mayor of the city. She ran unopposed in 1997, while in 2001 she ran up against term limits as mayor and was succeeded by her vice mayor Irma Anderson. In 1999 she had to fight the Chevron Richmond Refinery from lowering its property tax contributions and argue against the company insisting the city survive on a leaner budget. Corbin is still involved in local politics and campaigned against Indian casinos and in support of the failed Measure T.

Corbin studied at San Francisco State University for her BA and at University of California, Berkeley for her Master of library science degree.

She serves as a docent at the Rosie the Riveter/WW II Home Front National Historical Park Rosie the Riveter/Homefront World War II National Historic Park a project she spearheaded as mayor. She was also involved with the largely successful Main Street Project, which has resulted in remodeling MacDonald Avenue, the creation of the Richmond Transit Village and Richmond Shopping Center, and the resurrection of the MacDonald 80 Shopping Center. She is the Chair of the City of Richmond's Historical Preservation Commission, and she is the president of the board of Ujima, a substance abuse treatment program for women and their children.

She has described the relationship between the city and Chevron Corporation that operates as the community's largest employer Chevron Richmond Refinery as "complicated".
