= James T. Butts Jr. =

American politician and retired police chief

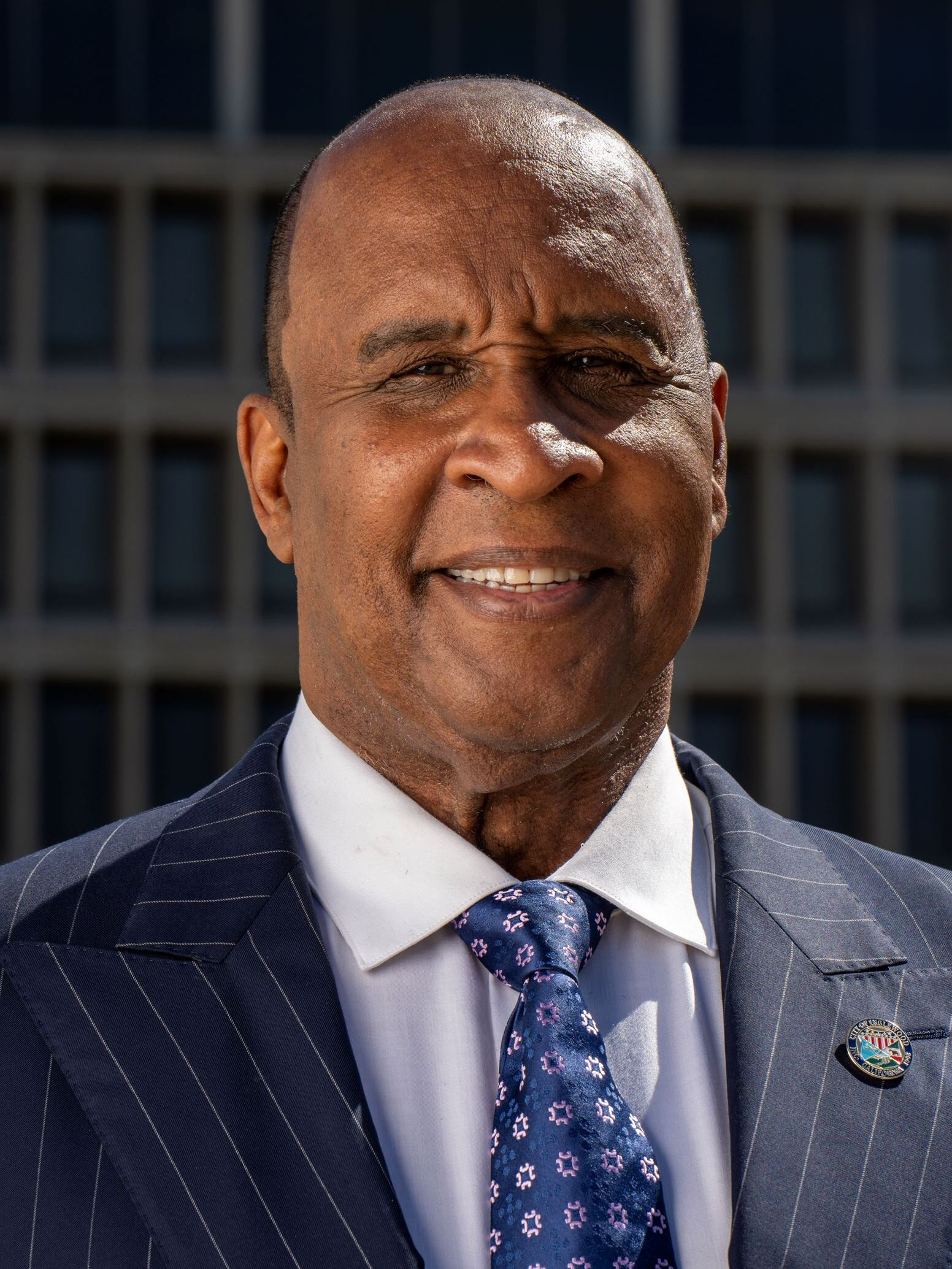

Mayor of Inglewood, California
- Incumbent
- Assumed office January 27, 2011
- Preceded by: Danny Tabor

Personal details
- Born: James Thurman Butts Jr. August 1, 1953 (age 73) Los Angeles, California, U.S.
- Party: Independent
- Education: California State University, Los Angeles (BS); California State Polytechnic University, Pomona (MBA)
- Occupation: Politician, former law enforcement official
- Police career
- Department: Inglewood Police Department; Santa Monica Police Department; Los Angeles World Airports Police; Police Department
- Service years: 1972–1991 (Inglewood); 1991–2006 (Santa Monica); 2006–2011 (LAX)

James Thurman Butts Jr. (born August 1, 1953) is an American politician, currently serving as the mayor of Inglewood, California. He rose through the ranks of law enforcement in Inglewood during the 1970s and 1980s, eventually becoming a Deputy Chief. He then worked as the Chief of Police in Santa Monica, California from 1991 to 2006. Butts then took a public safety position with Los Angeles World Airports in 2006. He was elected mayor of Inglewood in 2010 and re-elected in 2014 with 84% of the vote. Butts was re-elected in 2018 and 2022, becoming the longest-serving mayor in the history of Inglewood. He led efforts to renovate and reopen The Forum and develop a plan for SoFi Stadium and Intuit Dome in Hollywood Park.

== Early life ==
Butts Jr. was born and raised in Los Angeles. He is a graduate of Crenshaw High School and California State University, Los Angeles. According to James Butts, he played basketball for Cal State-Los Angeles. However, due to a knee injury and subsequent surgery, in order to pay for college, he worked part-time at the Inglewood Police Department as the department's second African-American cadet. Two years later he was hired as a full-time police officer. Butts received an MBA degree from California State Polytechnic University, Pomona (graduating summa cum laude) and a Bachelor of Science from California State University, Los Angeles.

== Professional career ==
=== Law enforcement career ===
James Butts joined the police force of Inglewood, California in 1972. He held several positions as a police officer, SWAT team commander, undercover officer, and robbery homicide detective. Butts was promoted to Sergeant in 1981, to Lieutenant in 1984, and then to Commanding Officer of the narcotics division in 1986. He led a team of 30 undercover agents that helped reduce drug trafficking in the Dixon-Darby and Lockhaven neighborhoods. In 1986, Butts was promoted to Chief of Operations and became the first African American at that level within a South Bay, California, police department.

In 1991, Butts moved to Santa Monica to accept the position of Chief of Police, a position he served until 2006. During Butts's tenure, crime was reduced by 64 percent. Early in his tenure, Butts conducted a month-long crime assessment at the city council's request. In his assessment, Butts concluded that drug dealing and violent crime at Palisades Park could be reduced by enforcing a city ordinance against sleeping in public parks. The city ordinance had been controversial; its enforcement was opposed by city attorney Robert M. Myers, who refused to write the ordinance or prosecute violators. As a result of his refusal, Myers was terminated by the Santa Monica City Council majority. The law was approved and Butts enforced it. The enforcement of this ordinance was credited with making the parks available for seniors and youth use.

In 1995, Butts was one of five police officers named as defendants in a lawsuit alleging the police department was engaging in post- Miranda invocation questioning that violated Miranda rights. In 2000, the Ninth Circuit Court of Appeals ruled that the police officers were accountable for Miranda violations, despite arguments by the police officers that they qualify for immunity since they were trained that continued questioning was allowed.

During Butts's tenure as Chief of Police, one of his direct reports was Eric Uller, the department's lead systems analyst who was accused of sexual abuse by over 200 people, many of whom were children at the time. Although many former Santa Monica employees told investigators in 2018 that they reported Uller's misconduct, Butts claimed in 2023 that "he was never made aware of any allegations against Uller."

In 2006, Butts took a position as the head of security and law enforcement for Public Safety Los Angeles World Airports (LAWA). According to the Los Angeles Times, Butts improved training and discipline at LAWA and fostered better relationships with local law enforcement agencies. In 2009, the TSA named LA International Airport as the most secure Cat X airport in the United States.

== Mayor of Inglewood ==
After returning to Inglewood, Butts began campaigning for mayor. His primary platform was a promise to reduce crime. Inglewood has a high crime rate, and its former mayor pleaded guilty to public corruption charges. He was elected as the mayor of Inglewood, California, on January 27, 2011. He won against incumbent Danny Tabor by a vote of 3,776 to 3,000. The Los Angeles Sentinel described it as a "tumultuous year of elections" for the city, with a close race between the two candidates. The city was operating at an $18 million deficit. Butts said he would overhaul the city's finances. He prevented municipal bankruptcy when Inglewood had no bond rating. His first State of the City address focused on public safety, finances and city leadership.

During Butts’ tenure as mayor, Inglewood experienced significant economic development, including major sports-related projects tied to the Los Angeles Rams, Los Angeles Chargers, and Los Angeles Clippers. The city also became home to the Girl Scouts of Greater Los Angeles office and the Los Angeles Philharmonic's YOLA Center, designed by Frank Gehry.

According to the Los Angeles Business Journal, the city's biggest budgeting problem at the time of his election was unfunded liabilities. The city had an agreement with local unions that required the city to pay benefits for the rest of an employee's life, even if the employee had worked for the city for only a few years. Butts negotiated with six unions to reduce this to 15 years with benefits that scale down over time. Butts and the City Council initiated a series of infrastructure repair and renovation projects. $1.18 million was spent on sewer projects compared to $140,000 the prior year. In December 2013, citizens protested in front of Butts's personal residence in response to expected layoffs of 50 city employees. Butts and the unions disagreed over whether the layoffs were necessary to balance the city budget.

Under Butts, the city has re-paved more street lanes, miles of roadway, and fixed linear feet of sidewalk than under any previous administration. Major corridors, including Century Boulevard, Florence Avenue, and Imperial Highway, some of which had not undergone significant reconstruction for approximately two decades, were also rebuilt. According to the Los Angeles Sentinel, Butts was the "driving force" behind a renovation of Inglewood's entertainment venue, The Forum, which was approved by the Inglewood City Council in May 2012. As a police officer, Butts worked at Lakers and Kings games at the Forum for almost two decades. He is credited with "cutting through bureaucratic red tape" to move the renovation project forward. The Forum was re-launched in 2014 with a $100 million renovation.

Butts was re-elected as mayor in November 2014 with 83 percent of the vote, the largest margin in Inglewood history. He was elected to the board of the Los Angeles County Metropolitan Transportation Authority in December 2014, succeeding Santa Monica Mayor Pam O'Connor.

In August 2015, the city of Inglewood initiated a widely criticized copyright infringement lawsuit against a citizen who was posting negative videos about Butts on YouTube using footage from city council meetings. A federal judge dismissed the lawsuit, as California law bars cities from claiming ownership of council videos, criticized the city officials for the apparent attempt to restrict Teixeira’s political speech and ordered the city to pay more than $117,000 for Teixeira's legal fees.

By 2020, Inglewood's unemployment rate had decreased from 17.5% to 4.7%, and the city promoted local hiring programs tied to major construction projects, including SoFi Stadium and other planned developments.

During his tenure, Inglewood was selected as the host city for Super Bowl LXI in 2027 and for the opening and closing ceremonies of the 2028 Summer Olympics. Other international sporting events hosted in Inglewood include Wrestlemania, the NBA All-Star Weekend, and the FIFA Soccer World Cup.

Other projects include $60 million to renovate the Main Library with A.I. labs and video production studios, and $200 million to modernize Inglewood High School.

The city has also continued to attract major concerts at The Forum, while the Hollywood Park development has undergone significant redevelopment into a mixed-use complex featuring high-end housing and retail. Butts played a key role in advancing these projects.

=== NFL ===
Butts lobbied for a $1.86 billion proposal to build an NFL stadium, which the city council approved in February 2015. He also convinced the NFL to relocate the Rams to the stadium in 2016, after 20 years without a professional team in the Los Angeles area, and brokered a deal with Stockbridge Capital Group to purchase 238 acres for the stadium and entertainment complex.

In 2016, Inglewood's former budget and accounting manager Barbara Ohno sued Butts and the city, claiming she was fired for blowing the whistle on accounting irregularities when the city was pursuing the NFL deal. She alleged Butts and his administration engaged in faulty accounting practices, fraudulent regulatory reporting, and reclassification of costs to depict a false financial picture. The city denied the claim and the lawsuit was settled in 2017.

According to USA Today, Butts has been "flattered by supporters" and "irritated by skeptics" on the deal. According to a March 2015 article in The Los Angeles Times, Butts made Inglewood an "unlikely frontrunner" as a potential home to an NFL team, but he was "criticized as dictatorial." Some citizens suspected budget approval was rushed because the city was under the influence of stadium developers, who made $100,000 in donations to the city. Butts said the same stadium developers also donated to his political opponents. In a 14-page report commissioned by opponents of the stadium plan, former Department of Homeland Security Secretary Tom Ridge warned that because of its proximity to LAX, terrorists could score a "terrorist event 'twofer' by shooting down an airplane over the stadium. Aviation experts, in a study commissioned by city of Inglewood, disputed the report’s claims. Butts called the Ridge report "fraudulent."

=== Ethics investigations ===
In 2018, an investigation by the California Fair Political Practices Commission, the Los Angeles County District Attorney, and the FBI began into the award of a 2012 trash hauling pact contract. The contract, valued at $100 million, went to a bidder with personal connections to current Mayor James T. Butts. The successful bidder, Consolidated Disposal Services, secured the contract soon after hiring Michael Butts, brother of Mayor Butts, as an operations manager. Another firm had refused to hire Michael and was not awarded the contract, even though their bid was $11 million less.

Butts was also found to have loaned $150,000 to the election campaigns of longtime Inglewood Councilman George Dotson and was accused of failing to disclose the status of repayments.

=== Madison Square Garden Co. lawsuit ===
In March 2018, the Madison Square Garden Co., which owns The Forum in Inglewood, filed a lawsuit against Butts and other city agencies for fraud and breach of contract. MSG alleged that Butts tricked them into terminating their lease of city-owned land by saying the city was going to use it to develop a technology park. Once MSG gave up the lease, they allege that Butts and the city of Inglewood engaged in secret talks with the Los Angeles Clippers to develop Intuit Dome on that land.

The Los Angeles County District Attorney’s office concluded in 2019 that the City of Inglewood violated state disclosure law during negotiations with the Clippers to build an arena. Butts disputed the DA office's letter detailing its conclusion.

=== Vehicle collision and lawsuits ===
In May 2019, Butts was involved in a traffic collision while driving a city-owned vehicle, in which a LAPD motorcycle officer was injured. Multiple lawsuits were subsequently filed against Butts and the city of Inglewood by those involved, including the injured officer, another driver, and the city of Los Angeles.

=== Relationship with employee and lawsuit ===
In 2010, Butts began a romantic relationship with Melanie McDade-Dickens, who worked on his mayoral campaign. After his election, he hired McDade-Dickens as his executive assistant and she was later promoted to aide to the city manager, with a salary of more than $300,000, yet Butts never disclosed their relationship. McDade-Dickens ended the relationship in March 2018. In July 2018, McDade-Dickens was escorted out of Inglewood City Hall by a security guard and placed on administrative leave; the city of Inglewood then fired her in January 2020.

Her filing was dismissed at summary judgement, meaning the judge did not find sufficient cause for it to go before a jury. An attorney for the city said Butts "denies any and all allegations of coercion or harassment."

McDade-Dickens and another former consultant had also alleged sexual harassment and abuse of power. The former consultant withdrew a false complaint lodged by the law firm of Carl Douglas.

=== Treatment of other women and lawsuits ===
In June 2018, after Inglewood resident activist Diane Sambrano criticized the City Council during one of its meetings, Butts was heard on a video recording saying, "Go choke yourself, Diane," into his microphone afterwards. Butts later told USA Today, "That lady irritates me but I don't recall saying it. If I did say it and it was caught on microphone, boy, I'm sorry."

When Inglewood Treasurer Wanda Brown attempted to discuss concerns at City Council meetings in 2020 about overspending, the city’s debt, and a first-time home-buyer program benefiting city employees, Butts reduced her speaking time and cut off her microphone. He claimed Brown was misleading people about the city's fiscal stability and later removed her from City Council meeting agendas and barred her from council chambers. The City Council later stripped Brown, a breast cancer patient who served in the role for 32 years, of many of her duties and cut her annual salary by 83% to $16,850. In August 2021, Brown filed a lawsuit against Butts and the city for defamation, retaliation and emotional distress, seeking lost wages, lost retirement benefits and attorney's fees. A Los Angeles County Superior Court judge dismissed the defamation portion of the lawsuit in September 2022, but allowed the retaliation allegations to move forward. The court found that she was not entitled to whistleblower retaliation. In January 2026, Brown was ordered to pay over $328,372 to the City after her appeal of the verdict for her whistleblower claim.

In October 2024, Inglewood's District 1 Councilwoman, Gloria Gray, filed a complaint against Butts, accusing him of creating a hostile work environment and engaging in intimidating and retaliatory behavior. She alleged that he withheld support for District 1 initiatives affecting her constituents and requested an independent investigation.

== Personal life ==
In 1992, Butts was investigated by the Los Angeles County District Attorney because his estranged wife at the time, Inglewood police sergeant Minnie Butts, accused him of molesting and physically abusing their 6-year-old daughter. Both Minnie and their daughter also said Butts choked Minnie to unconsciousness in 1991, prompting their daughter to call 911. Butts claimed the charges were "patently untrue" and said his wife made the claims because he filed for divorce and temporary custody of their daughter. The district attorney declined to file charges.

In March 2021, Butts suffered a cardiac event in his office at Inglewood City Hall, which required emergency surgery and days of hospitalization.

Preceded by Daniel K. Tabor	Mayor of Inglewood; 2012—present	Succeeded by Incumbent
