= List of mayors of Cotati, California =

Mayor of Cotati
- Incumbent; Susan Harvey since January 10, 2023
- Term length: 1 year
- Formation: July 18, 1963
- First holder: Morris J. "Sam" Houser

This is a list of mayors of Cotati, California.

The City of Cotati has had a mayor almost continuously since its incorporation on July 16, 1963. Each year, the Cotati City Council chooses one of its members to serve as mayor. Mayors usually serve for one year at a time, but many mayors have served multiple terms.

== Mayoral powers and duties ==
The mayor presides over meetings of the City Council and also chairs Cotati's redevelopment agency (CMC 2.40.050) and disaster council (CMC 2.24.030).

In addition, the mayor may:

- call special meetings of the council (Cotati Municipal Code 2.04.030),
- excuse the city manager from attending council meetings (CMC 2.12.130),
- appoint people to the Planning Commission (CMC 2.16.010), the Community and Environment Commission (CMC 2.20.030), the Police Auxiliary Commission (CMC 2.22.030), and
- administer oaths to witnesses at council meetings (CMC 2.32.050).

== Chronological list ==
Mayors of Cotati
	Name	Took office	Left office
1	Morris J. "Sam" Houser	July 18, 1963	November 5, 1964
2	Stanley C. Olsson	November 5, 1964	November 4, 1965
3	Lloyd B. Draper	November 4, 1965	April 6, 1967
4	Oliver V. Chadwick	April 6, 1967	April 18, 1968
5	Morris J. "Sam" Houser	April 18, 1968	April 3, 1969
6	Frank J. Dolinsek	April 3, 1969	April 21, 1970
7	Alfred Falletti	April 21, 1970	May 6, 1971
8	John L. "Jack" Groom	May 6, 1971	December 2, 1971
9	Frank J. Dolinsek	December 2, 1971	May 4, 1972
10	Annette Lombardi	May 4, 1972	January 4, 1973
11	Geoffrey Dunham	January 4, 1973	March 26, 1974
12	Stephen Laughlin	March 26, 1974	August 3, 1974
13	Geoffrey Dunham	August 20, 1974	April 1, 1975
14	Harry E. Fassio	April 1, 1975	March 9, 1976
15	William A. J. Payne	March 9, 1976	March 15, 1977
16	Allen C. Stansbury	March 15, 1977	March 14, 1978
17	Alfred Falletti	March 14, 1978	March 13, 1979
18	Robert E. Davis	March 13, 1979	April 15, 1980
19	Eve O'Rourke	April 15, 1980	April 14, 1981
20	Tamara Davis	April 15, 1981	June 7, 1982
21	Tamara Davis	June 8, 1982	June 14, 1983
22	Katherine Roberts	June 14, 1983	June 12, 1984
23	Arch Stewart	June 12, 1984	June 25, 1985
24	Linda Shorey	June 26, 1985	June 24, 1986
25	Bill Miller	June 24, 1986	June 23, 1987
26	Katherine Roberts	June 23, 1987	June 28, 1988
27	Arch Stewart	June 28, 1988	June 13, 1989
28	Robert E. Davis	June 13, 1989	June 26, 1990
29	Linda Shorey	June 26, 1990	June 12, 1991
30	Bill Miller	June 12, 1991	June 8, 1992
31	Sandra E. Elles	June 8, 1992	August 18, 1993
32	Richard M. Cullinen, Jr.	August 18, 1993	December 7, 1994
33	Harold B. Berkemeier	December 7, 1994	December 13, 1995
34	John A. Dell'Osso	December 13, 1995	December 11, 1996
35	Sandra E. Elles	December 11, 1996	December 10, 1997
36	Richard M. Cullinen, Jr.	December 10, 1997	January 13, 1999
37	Harold B. Berkemeier	January 13, 1999	January 12, 2000
38	Geoff Fox	January 12, 2000	January 10, 2001
39	Harold B. Berkemeier	January 10, 2001	January 9, 2002
40	Janet Orchard	January 9, 2002	January 15, 2003
41	Janet Kurvers	January 15, 2003	January 14, 2004
42	Pat Gilardi	January 14, 2004	January 12, 2005
43	Lisa Moore	January 12, 2005	January 11, 2006
44	Janet Orchard	January 11, 2006	January 9, 2007
45	Geoff Fox	January 9, 2007	January 9, 2008
46	Pat Gilardi	January 9, 2008	January, 2009
47	John Guardino	January, 2009	October 23, 2009
48	Robert Coleman-Senghor	January 9, 2010	January 12, 2011
49	Janet Orchard	January 12, 2011	January 11, 2012
50	Susan Harvey	January 11, 2012	January 9, 2013
51	Mark Landman	January 9, 2013	January 14, 2014
52	John Dell'Osso	January 14, 2014	January 13, 2015
53	Wendy Skillman	January 13, 2015	January 12, 2016
54	John C. Moore	January 12, 2016	January 10, 2017
55	Susan Harvey	January 10, 2017	January 9, 2018
56	Mark Landman	January 9, 2018	January 8, 2019
57	John A. Dell'Osso	January 8, 2019	January 14, 2020
58	Wendy Skillman	January 14, 2020	January 12, 2021
59	John C. Moore	January 12, 2021	January 11, 2022
60	Mark Landman	January 11, 2022	January 10, 2023
61	Susan Harvey	January 10, 2023	Incumbent
