= Roosevelt F. Dorn =

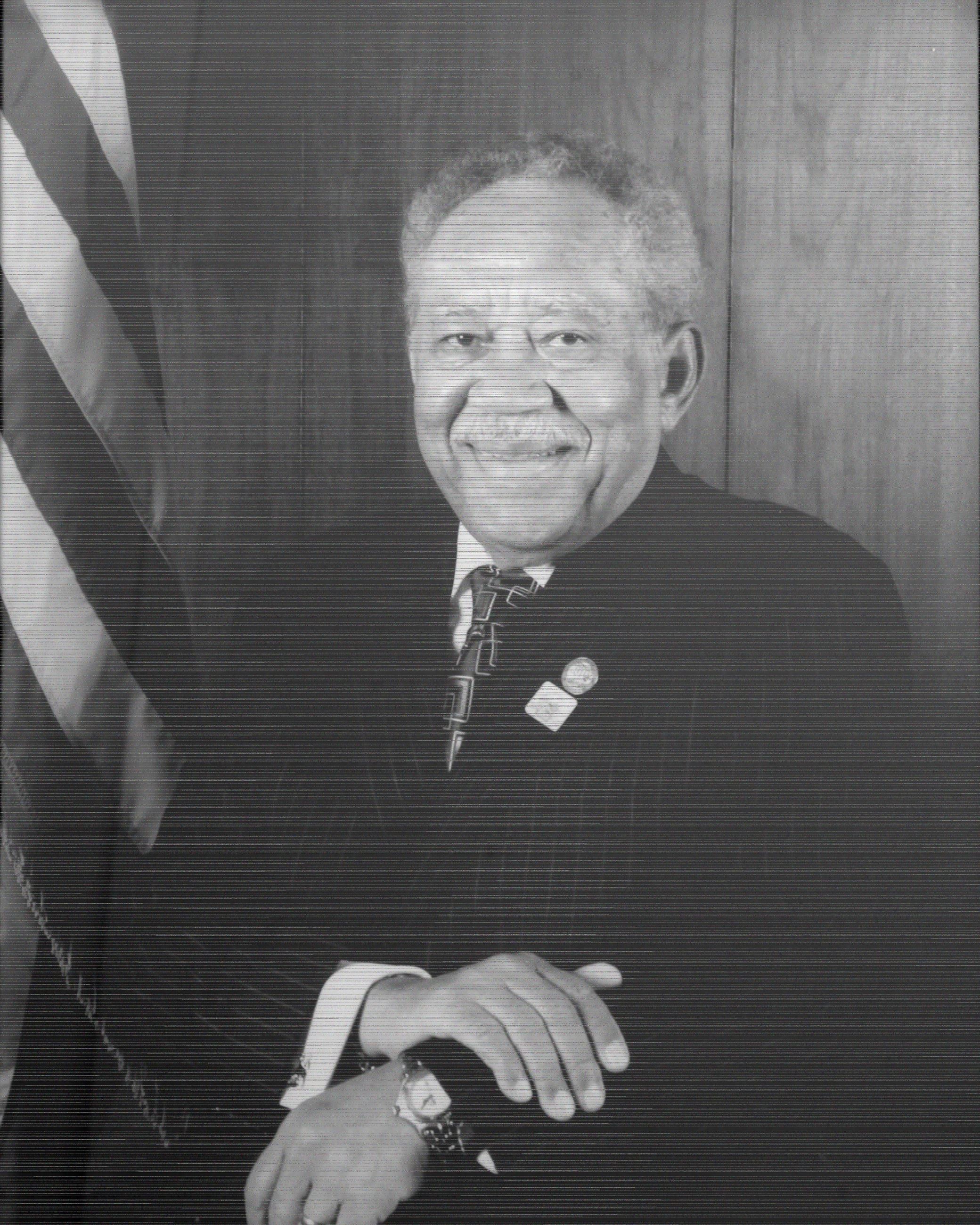

Mayor of Inglewood, California
- In office 1997 – January 24, 2010
- Preceded by: Edward Vincent
- Succeeded by: Danny Tabor

Personal details
- Born: October 29, 1935 (age 90) Checotah, Oklahoma

Roosevelt F. Dorn, was the former mayor of Inglewood, California. He was born October 29, 1935, in Checotah, Oklahoma.

Dorn was elected mayor in 1997 to fill the unexpired term of Edward Vincent, who had become a member of the state Assembly. He was elected to a full term on November 3, 1998, and again in 2003 and 2007.

Dorn served in the United States Air Force from 1954 to 1958. Joining the Los Angeles County Sheriff's Department as a deputy, he was a Superior Court bailiff from 1961 to 1969. After obtaining a law degree in 1969 from the Whittier Law School and passing the California State Bar Examination in 1969, Dorn worked as an assistant city attorney for the City of Los Angeles until 1979. California Governor Jerry Brown appointed him to the Municipal Court in 1979 and to the Los Angeles County Superior Court in 1980.

He married Joyce Evelyn Glosson in 1965. They have three children; Bryan Keith, Renee Felicia, and Rochelle Francine.

He is a member of several professional organizations including: National Bar Association, John Langston Bar Association, 100 Black Men of America (past national vice president), 100 Black Men of Los Angeles (past president), U.S. Conference of Mayors, National Conference of Black Mayors (past president), NAACP, New Frontier Democratic Club, and Whittier Alumni Association.

== Retirement ==
A criminal complaint was filed against Dorn on June 26, 2008, alleging he obtained a low-interest $500,000 loan from a fund that was intended to help municipal employees afford to live in town and/or improve their homes. Precipitated by a 2007 California Supreme Court ruling retroactively applied to a loan he applied for and was granted in 2004 (and repaid in full in 2006), Dorn was charged with felony misappropriation of public funds, using an unauthorized loan for private profit, and conflict of interest. He faced up to four years and eight months in state prison if convicted of all counts. Associated Press article in the San Francisco Chronicle, "Inglewood mayor charged in home loan scandal."

On Sunday, January 24, 2010 Dorn retired as Mayor of Inglewood. On Monday, January 25, 2010 he pled guilty to a misdemeanor conflict of interest charge and paid a fine of $1000; all other charges were dismissed. The court agreed the misdemeanor is not one of intent or moral turpitude; because this is not a strict liability offense, it does not affect his ability to practice law or hold public office.

Later in the day on January 25, 2010, the California Supreme Court, in the Lexin v. Super. Ct. case found that a mayor could apply for a low interest loan if it was available for the citizens also. Even though this case proves his innocence, he chose to still remain retired as a judge.
