= Danny Tabor =

American politician who served as the mayor of Inglewood, California

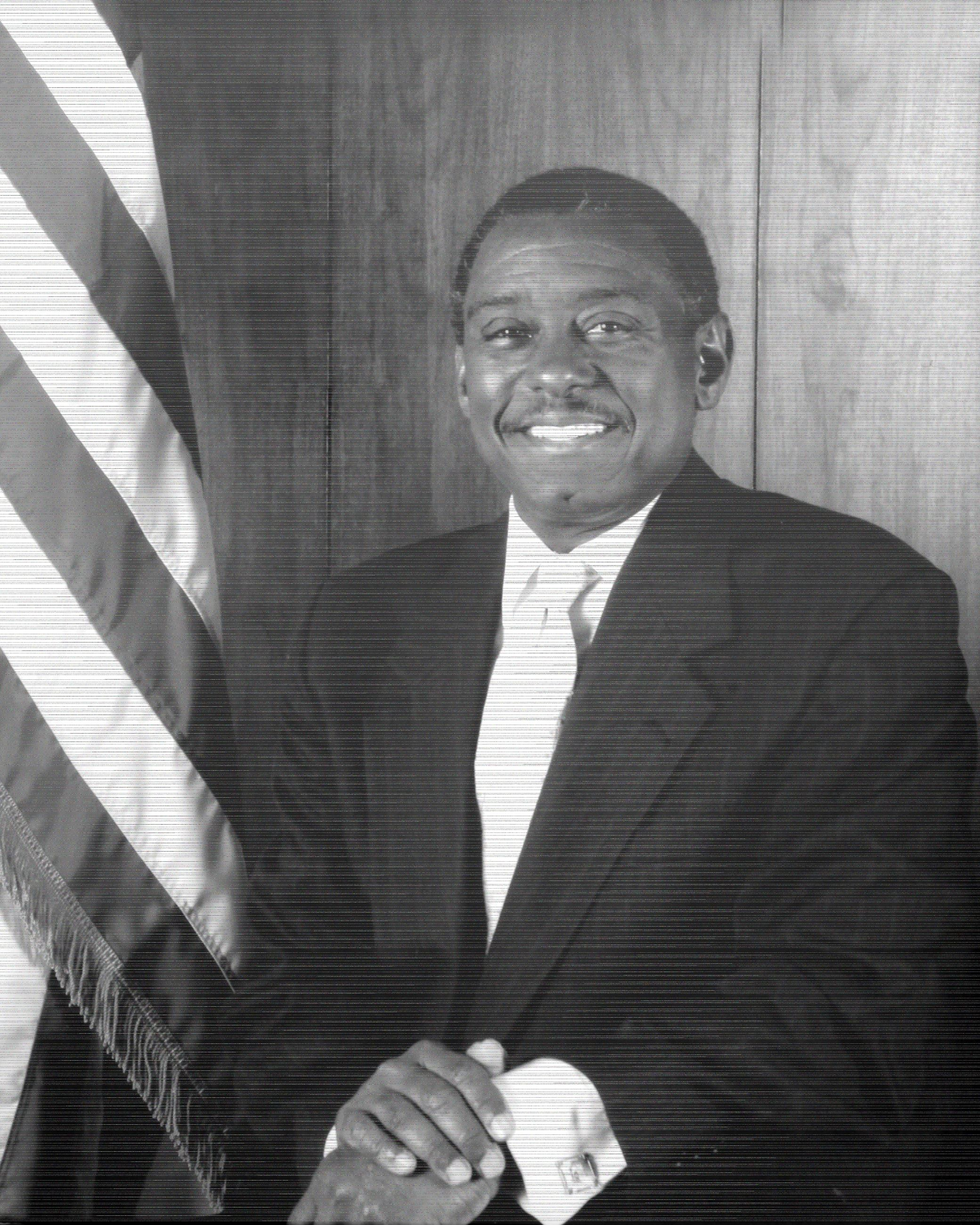

Vice President of the Los Angeles Board of Police Commissioners
- In office January 16, 2026 – June 30, 2030

Mayor of Inglewood, California
- In office September 14, 2010 – January 27, 2011
- Preceded by: Roosevelt F. Dorn
- Succeeded by: James T. Butts Jr.

City Council of Inglewood
- In office 2002–2010

Personal details
- Born: Daniel K. Tabor

Daniel K. Tabor, is an American politician who served as mayor of Inglewood, California, the third African-American to hold the position.

== Biography ==
Tabor was raised in Inglewood graduated from Morningside High School. After college, he worked as counsellor in Inglewood schools.

Tabor served as the Southern California Liaison for the Office of the Secretary, United States Department of Commerce, under Secretary Ronald H. Brown from 1993 to 1996. He was a negotiator of the settlement agreement between Los Angeles World Airports (LAWA) and the LAX Coalition for Economic, Environmental and Educational justice which brought $500 million in investments to local communities. He served on the Inglewood City Council representing the 1st District from 2002 to 2010. He was instrumental in easing tensions between the declining African-American population and the increasing Hispanic population which had led to a sharp increase in gang violence (Inglewood was 50% Hispanic and 43% African-American in 2010). In 2008, he brought the feuding groups together for a "Day of Dialogue."

On January 24, 2010, the prior mayor of Inglewood, Roosevelt F. Dorn, stepped down from the position and pled guilty the following day to a misdemeanor conflict of interest charge. In August 2010, Tabor won a runoff election to fill the remainder of Dorn's term besting his nearest opponent, 2nd District Council member Judy Dunlap. He was officially sworn in on September 14, 2010, inheriting a $15 million fiscal deficit. In the November 2, 2010 general election, he earned 43.2 percent of the vote compared with 31.0 percent for the next candidate, James T. Butts Jr. As he did not obtain a majority of the votes cast, a runoff election was scheduled in January 2011. Tabor lost by a vote of 3,776 to 3,000 and Butts was sworn in on January 27, 2011. The Los Angeles Sentinel described it as a "tumultuous year of elections" for the city, with a close race between the two candidates while the city was operating at an $18 million deficit.

Tabor serves as a member of the Los Angeles Board of Police Commissioners, a position he was appointed to by Mayor Karen Bass and confirmed by the Los Angeles City Council by a 12-0 vote. His four-year term ends on June 30, 2030.

Tabor is a member of Kappa Alpha Psi fraternity.
