= Browns Valley, California =

Unincorporated community in California, United States

Browns Valley
- Unincorporated community
- Location in California Browns Valley (the United States)
- Coordinates: 39°14′32″N 121°24′33″W
- Country: United States
- State: California
- County: Yuba
- Elevation: 269 ft (82 m)
- ZIP code: 95918
- Area code: 530

Browns Valley (also, Brown's Valley) is an unincorporated community in Yuba County, California, United States. Browns Valley is located 12 miles (19 km) northeast of Marysville and is near Collins Lake.

== History ==
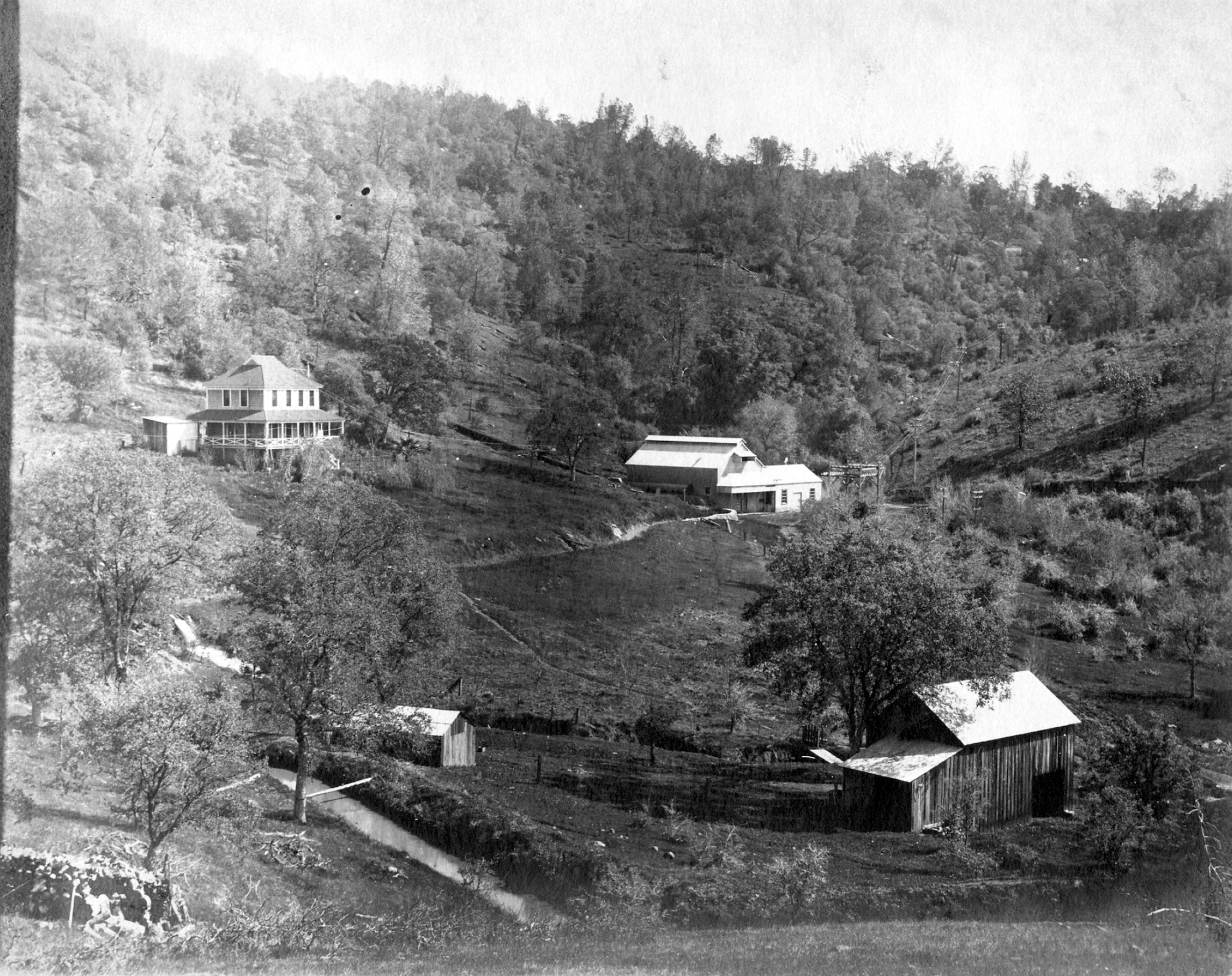
Yuba River (c. 1900), near Browns Valley, California

Before the establishment of the Browns Valley community, the land was the home to the Concow Maidu and the Nisenan people.

In the fall of 1849, gold was found in the township of Long Bar and along the Yuba River, only three miles away from Browns Valley. The name of the community was in honor of a settler who arrived in 1850 and discovered gold here. In the early days of mining in this area, gold was extracted in many different ways including hydraulic mining. The mines had to be continuous monitored because competition was high, and people would try to steal mining claims. Initially the area mined for gold, and when that ran out they mined quartz (which sometimes would encase the gold). The Chinese and Irish immigrants that came to the area for mining work, and also worked to build rock walls across many areas of Browns Valley.

In 1863, Tensions grew over the land in this area between miners, ranchers, and Native Americans; and there was a forced removal of Native Americans to a reservation in Mendocino County. A post office was established at Browns Valley in 1864.

Browns Valley was the home of the Sweet Vengeance Mine, founded by six African American men. Other African American mining operations in the community included the Rare Ripe Gold and Silver Mining Company (also known as the Rare Ripe Company); and the Horncut Mine. In 1868, the Rare Ripe Gold and Silver Mining Company incorporated, and had an office in Marysville.

== See also ==
- African Americans in California
