= Ben F. Gross =

American politician (1921–2012)

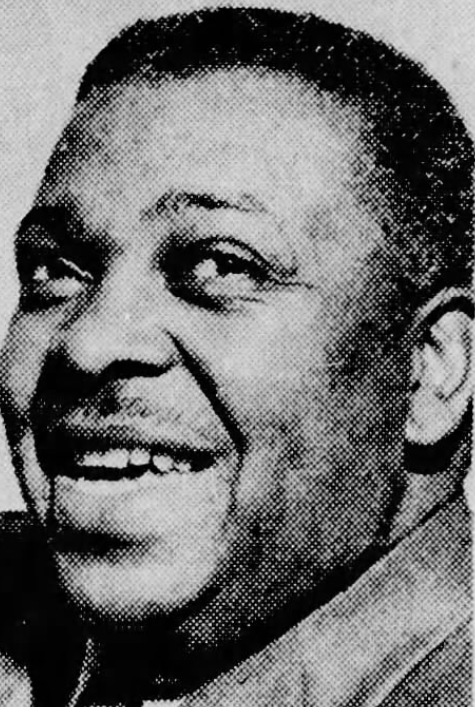

Mayor of Milpitas, California
- In office April 19, 1966 – April 16, 1968
- Preceded by: W. D. "Denny" Weisgerber
- Succeeded by: Robert E. Browne

City Council of Milpitas, California
- In office 1961–1971

Personal details
- Born: 1921 McGehee, Arkansas, US
- Died: August 13, 2012 (age 91) Detroit, Michigan, US

Ben F. Gross (1921 – August 13, 2012) was an American politician, union leader, and civil right activist who was the first African-American to serve as mayor of Milpitas and the first African-American mayor to lead a predominantly white city in California.

== Biography ==
Gross was born in 1921 in McGehee, Arkansas during the Jim Crow era. He is a graduate of Lake Village High School in Lake Village, Arkansas where he helped to organize protests against segregation. In 1948, he joined the U.S. Army and in 1949, he moved to Richmond, California where he worked at the Ford Motor Company plant. In 1950, he became the first African American elected to local union's (local 560) bargaining committee. In 1954, he was named the union's housing committee chairman and after Ford moved the plant to Milpitas in 1955, he developed Sunnyhills, one of the earliest integrated communities in California. In 1961, he was elected to the Milpitas City Council and on April 19, 1966, he was appointed mayor, the first African-American to be elected to a predominantly white city in California (In 1960, Milpitas was 94% white). While mayor, he aggressively resisted efforts by neighboring San Jose to annex Milpitas. He served until April 16, 1968 when his successor, Robert E. Browne, was sworn in as mayor. He remained on the City Council until 1971. He was named chairman of Local 560’s civil rights committee and participated in the March on Washington for Jobs and Freedom (1963), the Selma to Montgomery marches (1965), and the Poor People's March to Washington (1969). In 1971, he moved to Detroit where he served as the Assistant Director of the Civil Rights Department for the UAW. He retired in 1986 but continued to serve as an arbitrator.

Gross died in Detroit on August 13, 2012.

== See also ==
- List of first African-American mayors
- African American mayors in California

Preceded by W. D. "Denny" Weisgerber	Mayor of Milpitas, California; 1966–1968	Succeeded by Robert E. Browne
