= List of mayors of Richmond, California =

Mayor of Richmond
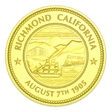
- Seal of Richmond

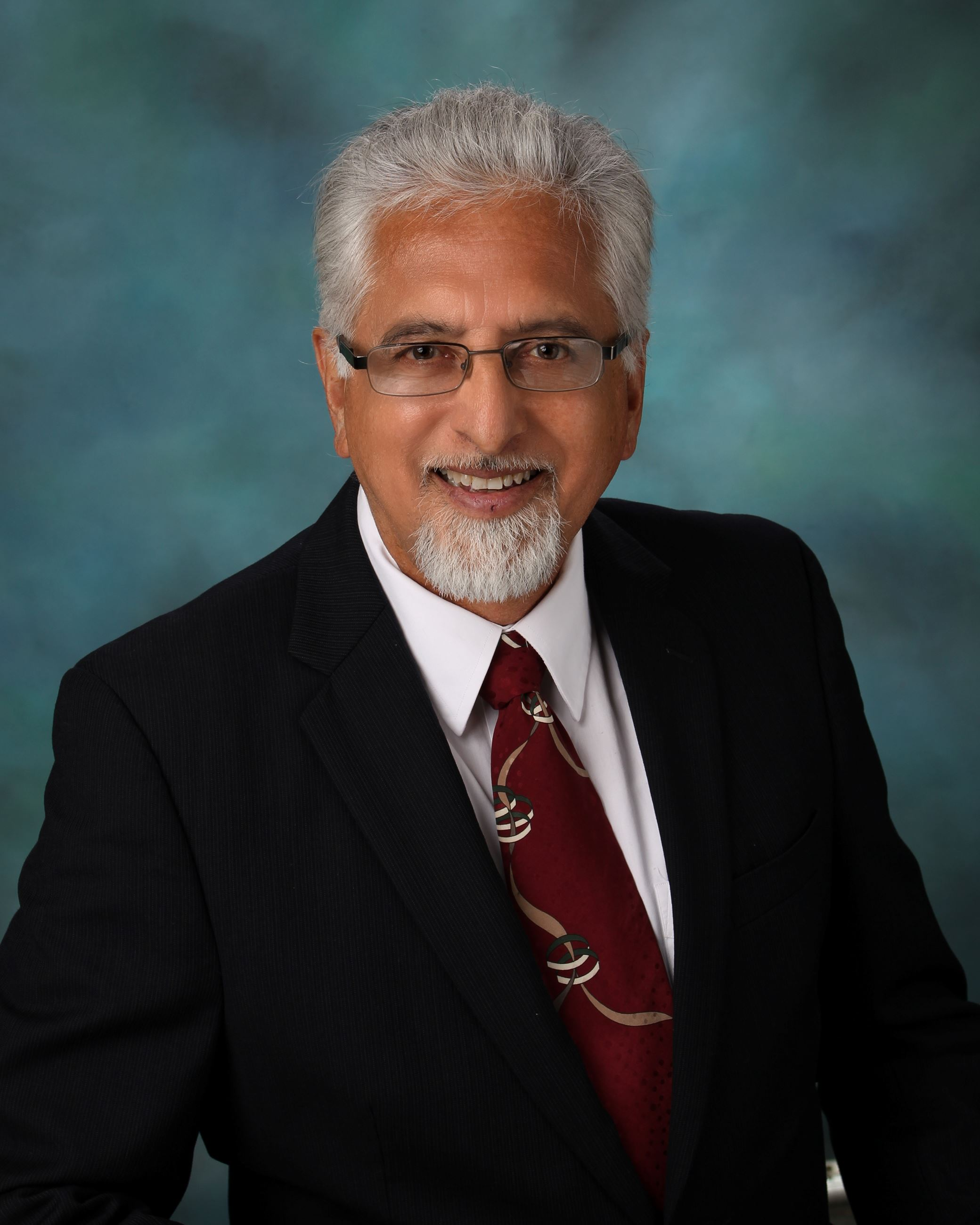
- Incumbent; Eduardo Martinez since January 10, 2023
- Term length: 4 years
- Formation: 1909
- First holder: J. B. Willis

== Mayors of Richmond, California ==
Image	Years of service	Mayor	Notes / Citation
	1909–1911	J. B. Willis	First mayor of Richmond, California
	1911–1913	J.C. Owens	
	1913–1914	O.R. Ludewig	
	1914–1917	E. J. Garrard	
	1917–1919	W.L. Lane	
	1919–1921	J.N. Long	
	1921–1923	E. J. Garrard	
	1923–1924	W. W. Scott (1st term)	
	1924–1925	J.H. Plate	
	1925–1926	W. W. Scott (2nd term)	
	1926–1929	Mattie Chandler	First woman mayor. 3 consecutive terms
	1929–1930	A.L. Paulsen	
	1930–1931	A.B. Hinkley (1st term)	
	1931–1933	R.J. Meyer	
	1933–1934	Walt Johnson	
	1934–1935	George F. Imbach	
	1935–1936	W. W. Scott (3rd term)	
	1936–1937	F. E. Tiller	
	1937–1938	A.B. Hinkley (2nd term)	
	1938–1939	O.R. Ludewig	
	1939–1940	John A. Bell	
	1940–1941	Samuel Sailele Ripley	
	1941–1942	W. W. Scott (4th term)	
	1942–1943	Mattie Chandler (2nd term)	
	1943–1944	F.E. Tiller	
	1944–1945	Robert D. Lee	
	1945–1946	C.D. Erickson	
	1946–1948	A.B. Hinkley (3rd term)	
	1948–1949	R.H. Miller	
	1949–1951	D.M. "Hap" Bradley	
	1952–1953	Gust J. Allyn	
	1953–1954	Ed J. J. McKeegan	
	1954–1956	John J. Sheridan	
	1956–1957	Al Cannon	
	1957–1958	James P. Kenny	
	1958–1959	Carl F. Lyford	
	1959–1960	Leo A. Viann	
	1960–1961	D.M. "Hap" Bradley (2nd term)	
	1961–1962	Gay Vargas	First Latino mayor
	1962–1963	Al Cannon (2nd term)	
	1963–1964	Gay Vargas (2nd term)	
	1964–1965	George D. Carroll	First African-American mayor
	1965–1966	David Pierce	
	1966–1967	Milton Spinner	
	1967–1968	Stanley Grydyk	
	1968–1969	J.J. Sheridan	
	1969–1970	George Livingston	2nd African-American mayor
	1970–1971	Donald Wagerman	
	1971–1972	Nat Bates	3rd African-American mayor
	1972–1973	Al E. Silva	2nd Latino mayor
	1973–1974	Booker T. Anderson	4th African-American mayor
	1974–1975	Richard Nelson	
	1975–1976	Gary Fernandez	3rd latino mayor
	1976–1977	Nat Bates (2nd term)	
	1977–1978	Donald Wagerman (2nd term)	
	1978–1979	Stanley Grydyk (2nd term)	
	1979–1980	Thomas Corcoran	
	1980–1981	Lonnie Washington	5th African-American mayor
	1981–1985	Thomas Corcoran† (2nd term)	First elected mayor, died in office
	1985–1993	George Livingston (2nd term)	Appointed on November 5, 1985 to finish Corcoran's term. Won election in 1989 becoming Richmond's first elected African-American mayor
	1993–2001	Rosemary Corbin	
	2001–2006	Irma Anderson	First African-American female mayor Spouse of prior mayor Booker T. Anderson
	2006–2015	Gayle McLaughlin	First Green Party mayor of Richmond, second female mayor.
	2015–2023	Tom Butt	
	2023–Present	Eduardo Martinez	4th Latino mayor of Richmond
	Mayor-elect takes office January 4, 2027	Claudia Jimenez	First Colombian foreign-born Latina mayor of Richmond
