= List of mayors of Milpitas, California =

Mayor of Milpitas
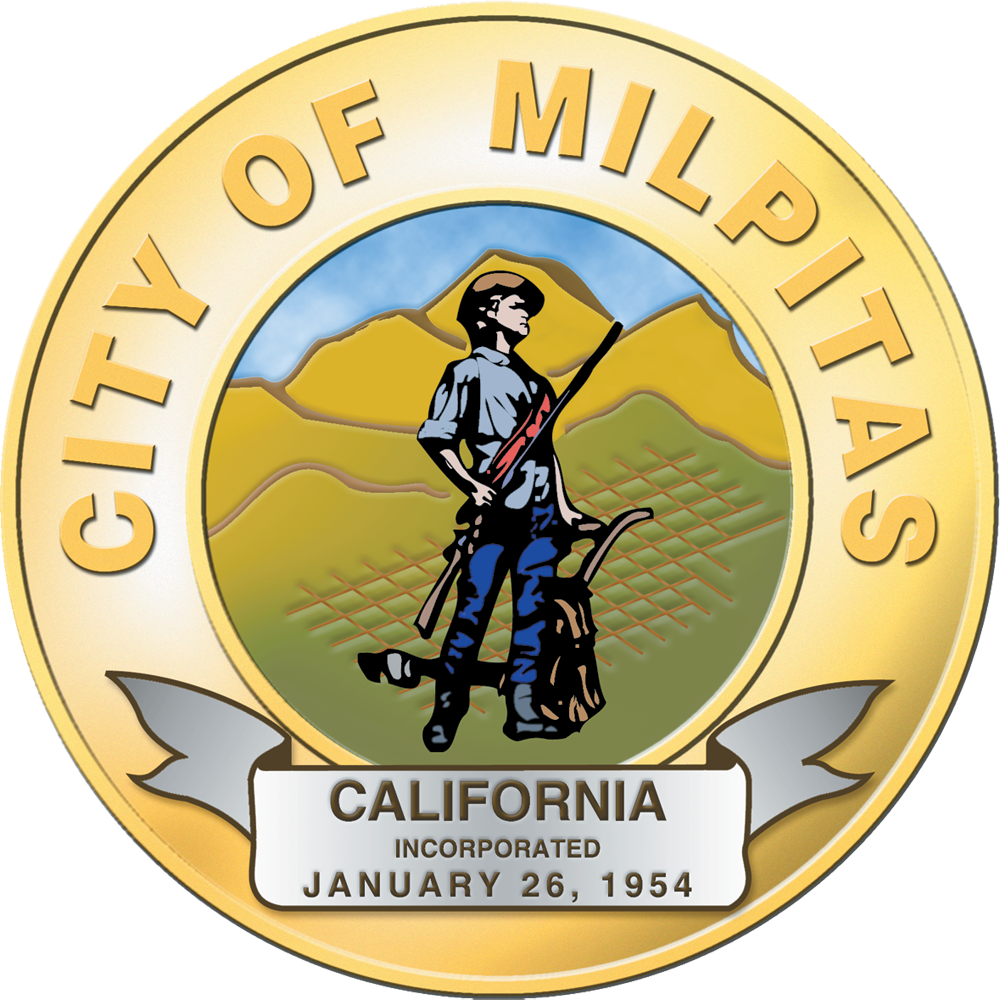
- Seal of the City of Milpitas.

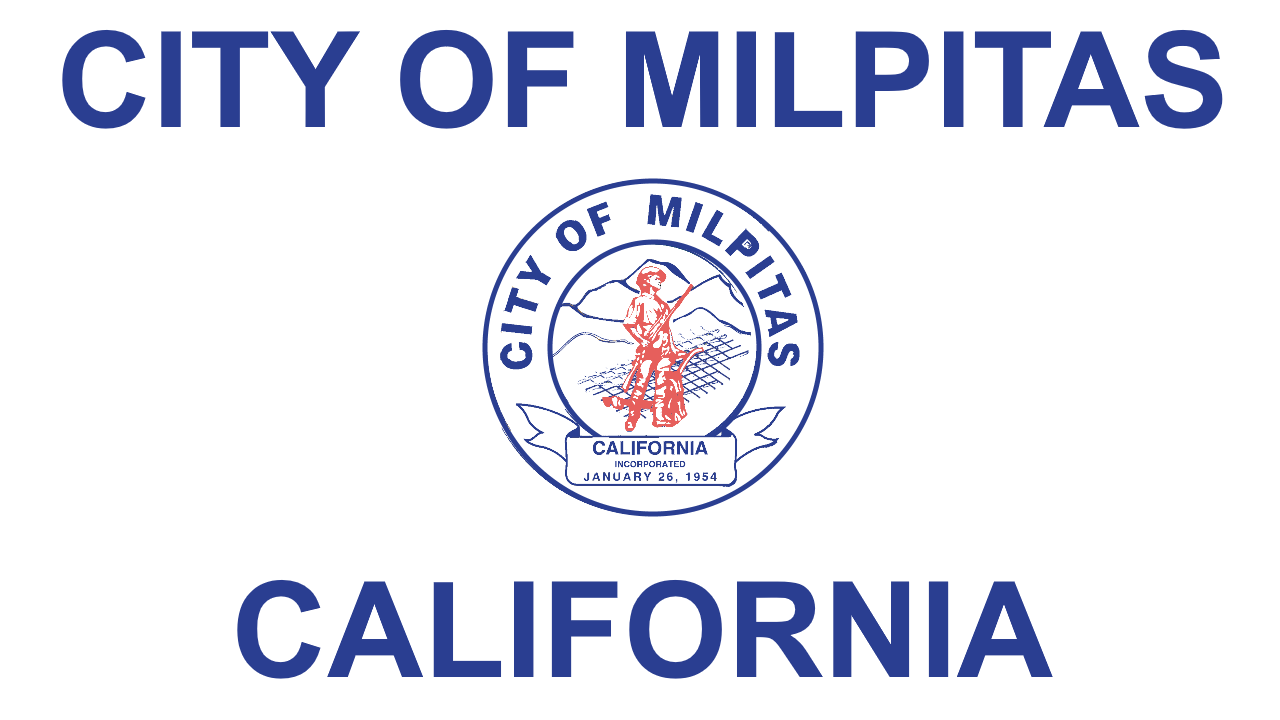
- Flag of the City of Milpitas.

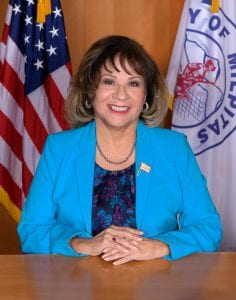
- Incumbent; Carmen Montano since December 13, 2022
- Term length: 2 years
- Formation: January 26, 1954
- First holder: Tom Evatt

This is a list of mayors of Milpitas, California.

== List of mayors ==
List of Mayors of Milpitas
#	Image	Mayor	Term start	Term end	Notes / Citations
Elected by City Council
1		Tom Evatt	January 26, 1954	April 17, 1956	
2		Tom Cardoza	April 17, 1956	April 15, 1958	
3		Jack Johns	April 15, 1958	April 19, 1960	
4		Richard B. Taylor	April 19, 1960	April 17, 1962	
5		W. D. (Denny) Weisgerber	April 17, 1962	April 19, 1966	
6		Ben F. Gross	April 19, 1966	April 16, 1968	First African-American mayor to lead a predominantly white city in California.
7		Robert E. Browne	April 16, 1968	April 21, 1970	
8		W. D. (Denny) Weisgerber	April 21, 1970	April 18, 1972	
9		Charles St. Clair	April 18, 1972	March 12, 1974	
10		Joseph W. House	March 12, 1974	March 9, 1976	
11		James H. Clement	March 9, 1976	August 3, 1976	
12		Robert E. Browne (replaced Clement)	August 3, 1976	March 7, 1978	
Elected by residents of Milpitas
13		Peter (Primo) McHugh	March 7, 1978	April 13, 1982	
14		Jim Rodgers	April 13, 1982	November 6, 1984	
15		Robert Livengood	November 6, 1984	November 8, 1988	
16		Elwood Johnson	November 8, 1988	November 6, 1990	
17		Peter (Primo) McHugh	November 6, 1990	December 3, 1996	
18		Henry Manayan	December 3, 1996	December 3, 2002	First Asian mayor of Milpitas
19		Jose Esteves	December 3, 2002	December 2, 2008	
20		Robert Livengood	December 2, 2008	December 7, 2010	
21		Jose Esteves	December 7, 2010	December 13, 2016	
22		Richard Tran	December 13, 2016	December 2022	
23		Carmen Montano	December 2022		First woman mayor
