= Sweet Vengeance Mine =

Historic gold mine in Yuba County, California

- Location within California Location within the United States
- Location: Browns Valley, California; 39°15′48″N 121°25′8″W

The Sweet Vengeance Mine was a gold mine in Browns Valley, California, discovered by African American miners during the Gold Rush. The mine was later owned and operated by a French company, which used one of the first stamp mills in California there.

== African American gold miners ==
The discovery of gold in 1848 and California's declaration in 1849 that it intended to become a free state were catalysts for free Blacks to migrate to California in search of gold.

After finding gold in Brown's Valley, six African American men organized the Sweet Vengeance mine company to work the claim. The partners included Gabriel Simms, Fritz James Vosburg, Abraham Freeman Holland, Edward Duplex, James Cousins, and M. McGowan. Moses Rodgers, an African American engineer and metallurgist whose services were highly in demand, also became a partner in the Sweet Vengeance Mine.

In 1919, historian Delilah L. Beasley wrote, “Judging from the title, it would seem to indicate that they were bent on proving to the world that colored men were capable of conducting successfully a mining business, even in the pioneer days in California.”

Although there was an "atmosphere of equality" among miners, in the competition for gold, there was also a tendency for White miners and claim jumpers to try to drive out non-Whites. The Sweet Vengeance miners were subjected to repeated attempts to drive them away. On one occasion, Vosburg was attacked by a gang of White claim jumpers, and stabbed their leader with a long knife. The Liberator newspaper reported that he had acted in self-defense.

The partners owned and operated the mine profitably through 1854. According to the journal kept by Vosburg, Holland, and Simms, the Sweet Vengeance Mine was especially profitable between April and May 1852, when they noted that they had found "rich dirt".

The men went on to use their profits from the mine to become entrepreneurs. Gabriel Simms opened the Franklin Hotel on First Street in Marysville, Yuba County. Edward Duplex went on to open a barbershop and later became the first African American mayor in California.

== Later history ==
The Sweet Vengeance Mine became known as a "big producer" in Browns Valley. It was the site of one of the first stamp mills in California, installed by a French company. The mine's previous owners were Spanish and had been milling using a primitive arrastra.

In 1935, Engineering and Mining Journal reported that Aladdin Gold Mining had started unwatering operations at the Sweet Vengeance Mine.
