= List of mayors of Inglewood, California =

Mayor of Inglewood

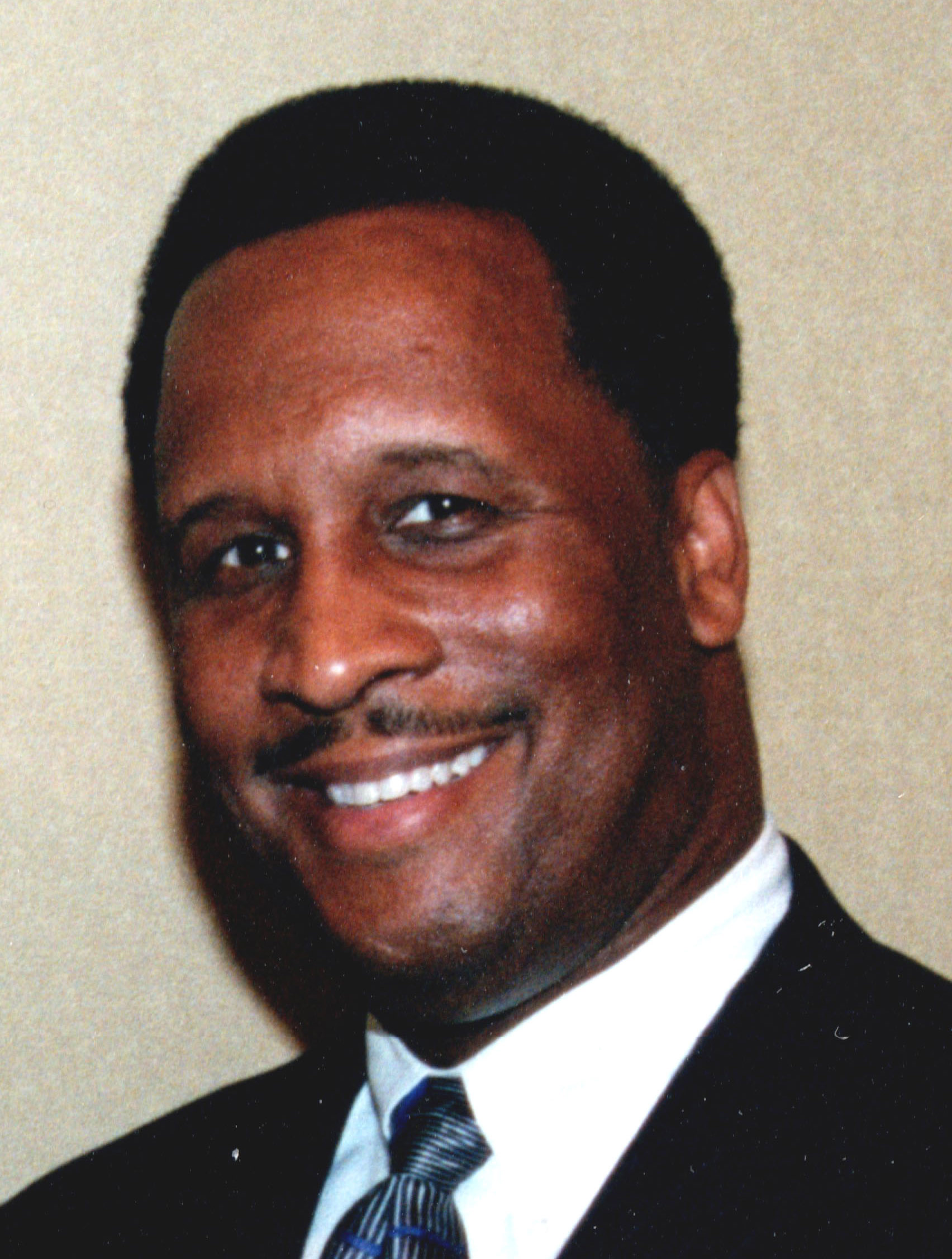
- Incumbent; James T. Butts Jr. since January 27, 2011
- Formation: 1908
- First holder: William H. Kelso

Following is a list of the mayors of Inglewood, California.

== Mayors of Inglewood, California ==
Image	Years of service	Mayor	Notes / Citation
	February 1908 – April 1914	William H. Kelso	First mayor of Inglewood, California
	April 1914 – April 1916	Louis B. Hardin	
	April 1916 – April 1918	William S. Hudson	
	April 1918 – April 1920	John Aerick	
	April 1920 – October 1920	Claude A. Allen	
	October 1920 – May 1924	Samuel H. Spafford	
	April 1927 – April 1931	Hugh B. Lawrence	
	April 1931 – December 1944	Raymond V. Darby	
	December 1944 – January 1951	Ernest S. Dixon	
	January 1951 – April 1963	George C. England	
	April 1963 – April 1971	William G. Goedike	
	April 1971 – April 1979	Merle Mergell	
	June 1979 – June 1983	Lee Weinstein	
	June 1983 – November 1996	Edward Vincent	First African-American mayor
	April 1997 – January 2010	Roosevelt Dorn	
	September 2010 – January 2011	Danny Tabor	
	January 2011 – Present	James T. Butts Jr.	
