= George Carroll (judge) =

American judge

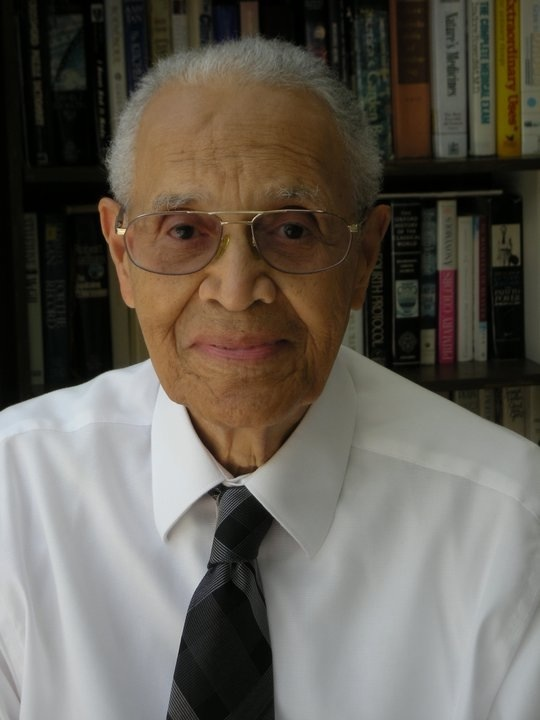
- Judge George D. Carroll

Judge of the Bay Municipal Court
- In office 1965–1985
- Appointed by: Pat Brown

Mayor of Richmond, California
- In office 1964–1965
- Preceded by: Gay Vargas
- Succeeded by: David Pierce

Personal details
- Born: January 6, 1922 Brooklyn, New York
- Died: January 14, 2016 (aged 94) Richmond, California

George Carroll (January 6, 1922 – January 14, 2016) was an American lawyer and civic figure, based in Contra Costa County, California. He served as the first black lawyer as well as the first African American to be elected to city council in Richmond. He later became the first black mayor of any large American city.

== Early life and education ==
Carroll was born on January 6, 1922, in Brooklyn, New York. Later he served in the United States Military during World War II and subsequently attended college and law school by use of the G.I. Bill. He relocated to Contra Costa County, California, in 1954.

== Career ==
Carroll Richmond opened his own private practice after relocating to Richmond in 1954, and he became the city's first black attorney.

In 1961, Carroll became the first African American elected to the city council, where he served until 1964.

In 1964, Carroll became the first black mayor of Richmond; by doing so, he also was the first African American mayor of any large American city. Afterwards, George Carroll became the first black judge in Contra Costa when he was appointed to the Bay Municipal Court by Governor Pat Brown in 1965.

== Personal life ==
Carroll died in his sleep on January 14, 2016, in Richmond, California, at the age of 94.

The Richmond Courthouse and a park in the Pt. Richmond District are named in his honor.

== See also ==
- List of first African-American mayors
- African American mayors in California
