= List of people from Compton, California =

This article lists notable people who are natives of Compton, California, or have been residents of the city.

== Arts and entertainment ==
- Anthony Anderson – actor, comedian
- Daysha Broadway – director, editor
- James Coburn – actor
- Kevin Costner – actor
- Guy Crowder – photographer
- Elaine Devry – actress
- Charles Dickson – artist, sculptor
- Ava DuVernay – film director, writer, and producer
- Travon Free – comedian, actor and TV writer
- Siedah Garrett – singer
- Danielle Herrington – model
- Amaud Jamaul Johnson – poet
- Anthony Johnson – actor, comedian
- Steve Lacy – musician
- Mark Christopher Lawrence – actor, comedian
- Robin Coste Lewis – poet
- Jacob Lusk – top five finalist on 2011 American Idol
- Lynn Manning – playwright; co-founder of Watts Village Theater Company
- Michel'le – R&B singer-songwriter
- Keb Mo – blues singer, guitarist
- Niecy Nash – actress, comedian, dancer, host of Clean House TV show on Style Network
- Krist Novoselic – bassist of Nirvana and politician
- Paul Rodriguez – comedian
- Latrice Royale – drag queen
- Mort Sahl – satirist, comedian
- Leslie Sykes – television news anchor
- Jackie Lynn Taylor – actress, TV personality
- TQ – singer
- James Wheaton – actor, writer, and educator
- Lillian Yarbo – actress, dancer and singer

=== Rappers ===
- 2nd II None – rap group
- Arabian Prince – producer and original member of N.W.A
- B.G. Knocc Out – rapper
- Big Fase 100 - rapper, The Game’s older brother.
- Boom Bam – Compton's Most Wanted
- Tha Chill – rapper, member of Compton's Most Wanted
- Compton's Most Wanted – rap group
- Coolio – rapper and actor
- CPO/Boss Hogg – rapper
- DJ Mike T – Compton's Most Wanted
- DJ Mustard – producer
- DJ Quik – rapper and producer
- DJ Slip – Compton's Most Wanted
- DJ Yella – World Class Wreckin' Cru, N.W.A
- Dr. Dre – rapper, songwriter, record producer, entrepreneur, founder of Aftermath Entertainment and member of N.W.A.
- Dresta – rapper
- Eazy-E – rapper, executive producer, founder of Ruthless Records, member of N.W.A, often referred to as the "King of Compton"
- The Game – rapper, actor.
- Greydon Square – rapper
- Guerilla Black – rapper
- Hi-C – rapper
- Hitta J3 – rapper
- Kendrick Lamar – rapper, songwriter and producer
- King Tee – rapper
- Lil Eazy-E – rapper, son of rapper Eazy-E
- MC Eiht – rapper, member of Compton's Most Wanted
- MC Ren – rapper, member of N.W.A
- Menajahtwa – rap group
- N.W.A – rap group
- Nationwide Rip Ridaz – rap group consisting of Compton Crip gang members
- Problem – rapper
- RJ – rapper
- Roddy Ricch – rapper
- Spider Loc - rapper
- Tweedy Bird Loc – rapper
- Tyga – rapper
- Westside Boogie – rapper
- YG – rapper

== Athletes ==
- Jeff Trepagnier – NBA player
- Arron Afflalo – NBA player
- Larry Allen – Pro Football Hall of Fame player
- Alex Acker – American professional basketball player
- Jeanette Bolden – UCLA track coach
- Earlene Brown – Olympic medalist
- Kenny Brunner – streetball player
- Cedric Ceballos – NBA player
- Tyson Chandler – NBA player
- Josh Childress – NBA player
- Robin Cole – NFL player
- Joey Davis – MMA fighter and folkstyle wrestler
- Baron Davis – NBA player
- DeMar DeRozan – NBA player, Olympic gold medalist
- Jim Derrington – Major League Baseball pitcher
- Charles Dumas – Olympic gold medalist
- Henry Ellard – NFL player
- Deon Figures – NFL player
- Mike Garrett – NFL player and Heisman Trophy winner
- Nesby Glasgow – NFL player
- James Harden – NBA player
- Danny Harris – Olympic medalist
- Floyd Heard – NFL player
- Brandon Jennings – NBA player
- Dennis Johnson – NBA player and coach
- Stafon Johnson – NFL player
- Bobby Jones – NBA player; writer/director
- Don Klosterman – Los Angeles Rams general manager
- Lionel Larry – World Championship medalist, track and field
- Lisa Leslie – WNBA player
- Tiny Lister – actor, professional wrestler
- James Lofton – Pro Football Hall of Fame player
- Mike McKenzie – NFL player
- Eddie Murray – Baseball Hall of Fame player
- Syd O'Brien – Major League Baseball player
- Troy O'Leary – Major League Baseball player
- Violet Palmer – first female professional sports official in the United States, NBA, and WNBA
- Tayshaun Prince – NBA player
- Oracene Price – tennis coach/mother of Venus and Serena Williams
- Mike C. Richardson – NFL player, member of 1985 Super Bowl champion Chicago Bears
- Jerry Robinson – NFL player
- Pete Rozelle – NFL commissioner
- Woody Sauldsberry – NBA player, Harlem Globetrotter
- Richard Sherman – NFL cornerback
- Dennis Smith – NFL player
- Lonnie Smith – Major League Baseball player
- Reggie Smith – Major League Baseball player
- Rico Smith Jr. – NFL player
- Duke Snider – Major League Baseball outfielder
- Dennis Thurman – NFL player
- Greg Townsend – NFL player
- Quincy Watts – Olympic track and field gold medalist
- Bryant Westbrook – NFL player
- Frank K. Wheaton – sports agent, personal manager and former official spokesperson of Compton
- Leon Allen White a.k.a. Big Van Vader) – NFL player and professional wrestler
- Roy White – Major League Baseball player
- Marcellus Wiley – NFL player, ESPN football analyst and radio personality
- Ulis Williams – Olympic gold medal in track and field and former Compton College president/superintendent
- Richard Williams – tennis coach
- Serena Williams – tennis player
- Venus Williams – tennis player
- Don Wilson – Major League Baseball player
- Datone Jones – NFL Player
- Keisean Nixon — NFL Player
- Big Van Vader - WWF Wrestler

== Entrepreneurs ==
- John Hope Bryant – founder, chairman and CEO of Operation HOPE, Inc. and the Promise Homes Company
- Suge Knight – founder and former CEO of Death Row Records
- Eazy-E - Founder, and CEO of Ruthless Records

== Civic leaders ==
- Isadore Hall III – former state senator, state Assemblymember, City Council member and School Board member
- Aja Brown – former mayor of Compton and youngest mayor in history of Compton
- Omar Bradley – former mayor of Compton
- Former president George H. W. Bush, former first lady Barbara Bush and former president George W. Bush lived in Compton in 1949. George and Barbara's second child Robin was born there.
- Lionel Cade – former mayor of Compton
- LaToya Cantrell – mayor of New Orleans
- Del M. Clawson – US Congressman and former mayor of Compton
- Doris A. Davis – first African-American female mayor of a metropolitan city, Compton
- Douglas Dollarhide – California's first African-American mayor of a metropolitan city, Compton
- Roger Hedgecock – 30th mayor of San Diego, radio talk show host
- Rizza Islam (born 1990), member of the Nation of Islam and social media influencer
- Eric J. Perrodin – mayor of Compton
- Walter R. Tucker, Jr. – former mayor of Compton
- Walter R. Tucker III – former U.S. Congressman, mayor of Compton; son of Walter R. Tucker Jr.

== Other ==
- Kimberly Anyadike – youngest African-American woman to pilot a plane solo across the United States
- Norman Flowers, rapist and serial killer
- Roger Hedgecock – conservative radio talk show host and former mayor of San Diego
- Pauline Robinson Bush – George H. W. Bush’s daughter
- Orlando Anderson (1974-1998) – gang member suspected for the Murder of Tupac Shakur
