= Chester R. Crain =

American politician (1914–1984)

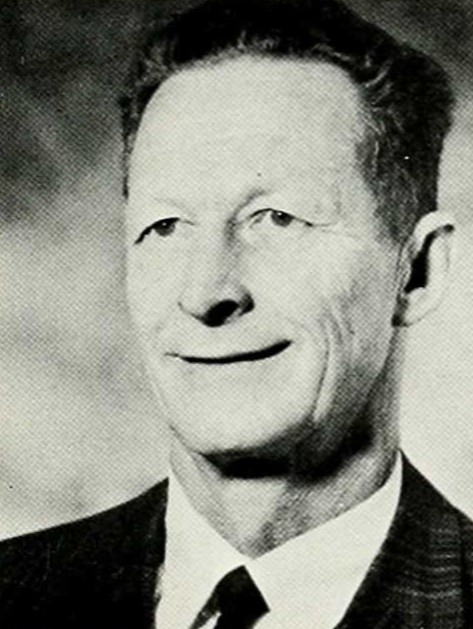
- Crain in 1968

Mayor of Compton, California
- In office 1963–1969
- Preceded by: Del M. Clawson
- Succeeded by: Douglas Dollarhide

City Council of Compton, California
- In office 1953–1963
- Preceded by: Unknown
- Succeeded by: Unknown

Personal details
- Born: Chester Russell Crain; March 15, 1914 Des Moines, Iowa, U.S.
- Died: December 13, 1984 (aged 70) Fresno, California area, U.S.
- Parent(s): Carl R. Crain; Lillie Crain

Chester R. Crain (March 15, 1914 – December 13, 1984) was an American politician who served as the 10th, and last white, mayor of Compton, California, from 1963 to 1969.

== Biography ==
Chester Russell Crain was a native of Des Moines, Iowa. He was the third of at least nine children born to Carl R. and Lillie (Smith) Crain. In the 1920s, the family moved to California and settled in the Signal Hill area.

He was employed as track and field coach and a professor of English at Compton Community College. In 1953, Crain was elected to the Compton City Council, representing the 2nd District. He became the city's mayor after the resignation of Congressman-elect Del Clawson in 1963. He served as mayor of Compton, California during a tumultuous period in the city's history. Unlike some of his predecessors that were uncomfortable with the town's growing black population, Crain attempted to build bridges and make Compton a model of integration.

However, just a few months after his re-election in 1965, the Watts Riots broke out in the adjacent community in Los Angeles. He was an outspoken critic of Los Angeles Mayor Sam Yorty and accused him of neglecting the predominantly African American community. He was once quoted as saying, "Has he ever been to Watts?"

In the wake of the riots many of the remaining whites left Compton and moved to new suburbs in nearby Los Angeles County communities such as Lakewood or to Orange County, a few miles south of Compton.

During his tenure, Compton's city council became majority African American. In 1969, he did not seek re-election and watched as City Councilman Douglas F. Dollarhide became the city's first black chief executive. By that time, the population of Compton was roughly 65% black.

After leaving office, Crain moved to the northern part of the state. He died in the Fresno, California, area at the age of 70. He was living in Tulare County at the time of his death.

Political offices
| Preceded by Unknown | Compton, California City Council; 2nd District; 1953–1963 | Succeeded by Lionel Cade? |
| Preceded by Del Clawson | Mayor of Compton, California; 1963–1969 | Succeeded by Douglas Dollarhide |
