= Dollarhide =

Dollarhide is a surname. Notable people with the surname include:

- Douglas Dollarhide (1923–2008), American politician
- Theodore Dollarhide (1948–2014), American composer, conductor, and music educator
