= A. Leroy Aylmer =

American politician

Albert Leroy Aylmer (March 29, 1885 – January 10, 1970) was an American politician who served as Mayor and later City Attorney of Compton, California.

== Biography ==
Albert Leroy Aylmer was born March 29, 1885, in North Dakota, an attorney by trade.

== Political career ==
In the wake of C. S. Smith's 1936 recall, Aylmer became Mayor of Compton. After serving as mayor, Aylmer was elected City Attorney in 1949. However, he was so unpopular that four years later when he was up for re-election, he finished third in the primary.

He died January 10, 1970, in Los Angeles County, California.

Political offices
| Preceded by C. S. Smith | Mayor of Compton, California; 1936–1941? | Succeeded by Unknown |
| Preceded by Unknown | City Attorney, Compton, California; 1949–1953 | Succeeded by Unknown |
