= Jane Robbins =

Jane Robbins may refer to:

- Jane Robbins (sculptor) (born 1962), British sculptor
- Jane D. Robbins (1919–2008), American Compton city councillor
- Jane Elizabeth Robbins (1860–1946), American physician and social worker
