= Walter R. Tucker Jr. =

American politician

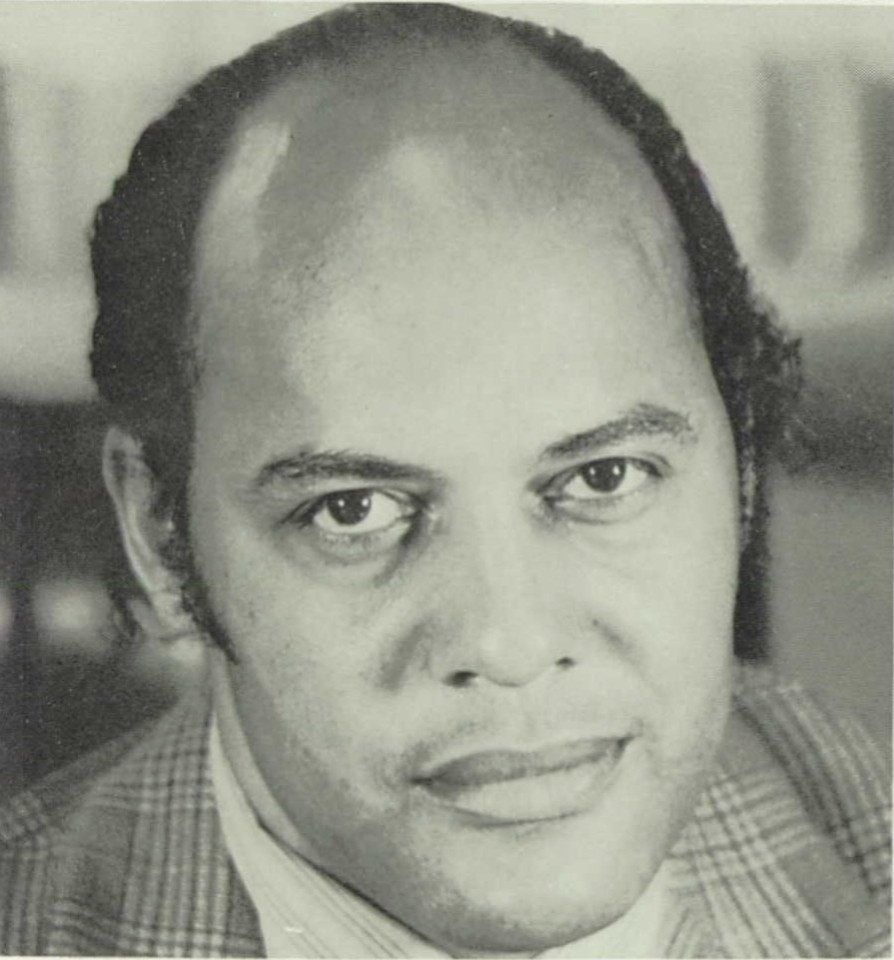
- Tucker in 1973

Mayor of Compton, California
- In office 1981–1990
- Preceded by: Lionel Cade
- Succeeded by: Walter R. Tucker III

Member of the Compton (California) City Council from the 3rd district
- In office 1973–1977
- Preceded by: Unknown
- Succeeded by: Robert "Bob" Adams

Personal details
- Born: Walter Rayford Tucker Jr. August 27, 1924 Oklahoma
- Died: October 1, 1990 (aged 66)
- Spouse: Martha Hinton
- Children: Keta Gale Tucker; Walter R. Tucker III; Kenneth N. Tucker; Camille E. Tucker
- Education: Meharry
- Occupation: Dentist, politician

Walter Rayford Tucker Jr. (August 27, 1924 – October 1, 1990) was an American dentist and politician who served nine years as the Mayor of Compton, California.

== Biography ==
Walter Rayford Tucker, Jr. was born in Oklahoma. He became a dentist and moved to Compton, California in the 1950s. Later he was elected to the City Council.

In 1969, he lost a run-off with City Councilman Douglas Dollarhide to become the city's first African American mayor. Eight years later, Tucker lost a close race against Lionel Cade for the same position. Finally in 1981, he came back to decisively defeat Cade. He went on to serve nine years as mayor until his death from stomach cancer at the age of 66. His son, Walter R. Tucker III, succeeded him in a special election held the following year. Another son, Kenneth, unsuccessfully ran to replace his brother after the latter was elected to Congress in 1992.

== Personal life ==
Tucker Jr. was a member of Omega Psi Phi fraternity. While attending Meharry Medical College School of Dentistry in Nashville, Tennessee, he met Martha Hinton, a student at Fisk University. They married and had four children: Keta, Walter, Kenneth and Camille.

It is noted that Tucker came from a family of educators. His father was principal of the local high school in Haskell, Oklahoma. His mother was a teacher there. Out of eight children, all obtained college degrees. Tucker and two of his brothers were doctors and five other siblings obtained master's degrees and became educators.

Circa 1970 Tucker bought land and built a medical building with his brothers, Booker T., an oral surgeon, and S. Edward, an OBGYN. At the time, they were in a small group of African American doctors in Los Angeles who owned their own medical building. Serving the Watts community for many years, the brothers finally sold the building in the 80's and the area was redeveloped into a strip mall. In addition to practicing dentistry and holding political office, Tucker served as an Associate Pastor at Zion Baptist Church.

Political offices
Preceded by Lionel Cade?	Compton, California City Council; 3rd District; 1973—1977	Succeeded by Robert "Bob" Adams
Preceded by Lionel Cade	Mayor of Compton, California; 1981–1990	Succeeded by Walter R. Tucker III
