= Dickison =

Dickison is a surname. Notable people with the surname include:

- Bruce Dickison (born 1953), New Zealand rugby league footballer and coach
- C. A. Dickison (1878–1965), American politician
- Don Dickison (born 1966), Canadian rower
- Ian Dickison (born 1952), New Zealand lawn and indoor bowler
- J. J. Dickison (1816–1902), Confederate Army officer
- Mike Dickison (born 1968 or 1969), New Zealand Wikipedian, zoologist, and museum curator
- Randy Dickison (died 1996), American diver

== See also ==
- Dickinson (name)
- Dickson (surname)
