= Jane D. Robbins =

American politician (1919–2008)

Member of the Compton (California) City Council from the 4th district
- In office 1976–1995
- Preceded by: Hillard Hamm
- Succeeded by: Fred Cressel

Personal details
- Born: Jane Ellen Dickison; June 26, 1919 Compton, California
- Died: March 1, 2008 (aged 88)
- Party: Republican
- Spouse: Robert Robbins
- Relations: Father: Clarence Anson Dickison; Mother: Meda Kelso
- Children: Paula Mae Robbins; Robyn Jane Robbins
- Occupation: School principal

Jane D. Robbins (June 26, 1919 – March 1, 2008) served on the Compton City Council from 1976 until 1995. She is the last Anglo and Republican to serve on the Compton City Council.

== Biography ==
Born Jane Ellen Dickison on June 26, 1919, as the daughter of Clarence Anson Dickison (July 28, 1878 – February 8, 1965), a school teacher, who in 1924 became Compton's first mayor and the former Meda Kelso (October 2, 1885 – July 31, 1962). Both of her parents are natives of the state of Missouri.

She met her future husband, Compton Police Officer Robert Robbins on a blind date. They married just three days later. The union produced two daughters, Paula Mae and Robyn Jane.

In 1976, when Compton City Councilman Hillard Hamm was convicted of extortion, Robbins, won a special election to fill his seat. Prior to her election, she was principal of Dickison Elementary, named after her father.

Robbins who'd rather recite a poem or share anecdotes about the city's history than debate political issues, was so beloved by her constituents, that she won reelection four times without extensive campaigning. She served until 1995, when she lost a fifth reelection bid to Fred Cressel.

Upon her defeat, Omar Bradley, Compton's often controversial mayor, spoke very highly of her. "Miss Robbins never ever said a mean thing about anyone. She was never vindictive, even when she was attacked," Bradley was quoted in a Los Angeles Times article about her. "I would like to be more like that."

Upon leaving office, Robbins had the distinction of having the longest tenure of service on the Compton City Council. Her record would stand until Yvonne Arceneaux, broke her record in 2012.

Robbins died on March 1, 2008, at the age of 88.

Political offices
Preceded by Hillard Hamm	Compton, California City Council; 4th district 1976–1995	Succeeded by Fred Cressel
