= Perrodin =

Perrodin is a surname. Notable people with the surname include:

- Elvis Perrodin (1956–2012), American jockey
- Eric J. Perrodin (born 1959), American politician
