= Pacific Coast Waste and Recycling =

Pacific Coast Waste and Recycling

Pacific Coast Waste and Recycling, LLC (PCW&R) is a private waste management company located in Compton, California, established in 2005. It is one of the few African-American owned and operated waste and recycling company in California and the United States. In addition to providing waste collection service to businesses throughout Los Angeles, the company also provides municipal waste collection and recycling services for the city of Compton, CA. In 2013, PCW&R was acquired by Republic Services.

== History ==
Pacific Coast Waste & Recycling was formed in 2005 by three business partners: Mel Howard, Steve Tucker, and Richard Macias. Howard, Tucker, and Macias all worked in the waste industry, mainly with Waste Management, Inc., before starting their minority-owned venture.

In 2007, Pacific Coast Waste & Recycling was awarded a five-year contract as the City of Compton's trash collection and recycling provider. In 2010, based upon their performance during the preceding three years, the company's agreement with the City of Compton was extended by seven years.

In 2012 the company was awarded a five-year contract as the City of Inglewood's trash collection and recycling provider for rolloff containers. The same year, it was awarded a five-year contract by the Los Angeles County School District for recycling services.

In August 2013, Pacific Coast Waste & Recycling was purchased by Consolidated Disposal Service, LLC, a subsidiary of Republic Services, Inc.

== Management and Ownership ==
Prior to forming Pacific Coast Waste & Recycling, Mel Howard had worked in an executive capacity in the waste and recycling industry for over 21 years. Mr. Howard held executive positions for USA Waste Services and Waste Management until 2005, when he, Steve Tucker, and Richard Macias formed Pacific Coast Waste & Recycling. Mel Howard served as the company's President and Chief Executive Officer. Steve Tucker served as the company's Chief Operating Officer. Tucker had worked in an executive capacity in the waste industry and recycling industry for over 26 years. Tucker has served as a corporate officer / executive for two Fortune 100 waste industry companies, namely Waste Management, USA Waste Services, and Browning-Ferris Industries. Macias served on the board of directors and was a founding member of a local bank in the San Gabriel Valley. Richard Macias served as Chief financial officer for Pacific Coast Waste & Recycling.

== Corporate Citizenship ==
The company sponsors charitable events, provides college scholarships, senior meals programs, and assists local elementary schools with educational materials.

== See also ==
- Allied Waste Industries
