= List of mayors of Compton, California =

Mayor of Compton, California

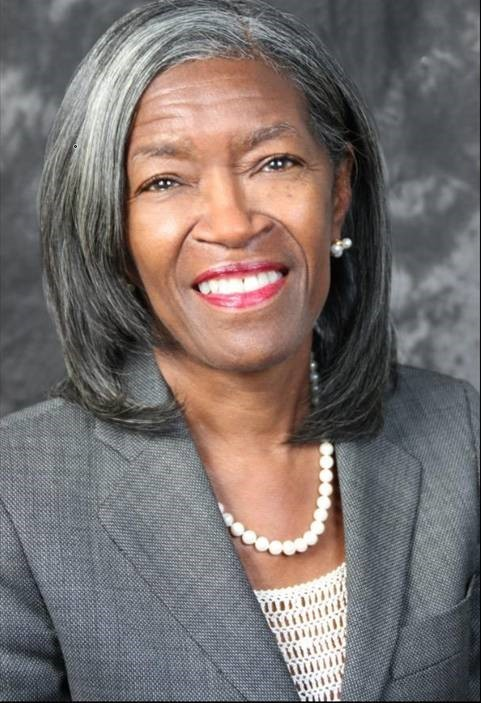
- Incumbent; Emma Sharif since June 30, 2021
- Inaugural holder: C.A. Dickison
- Formation: 1924
- Salary: $30000/year
- Website: City of Compton-Aja Brown, Mayor

This is a list of mayors of Compton, California.

== Mayors ==
#	Image	Mayor	Term	Party	Notes
1		C. A. Dickison	1924–1933	Republican	First mayor
2		C. S. Smith	1933–1936	Democratic	First Democratic mayor
3		A. Leroy Aylmer	1936–1941	Republican	It is unclear who served from 1941 until 1945.
4		Roy W. Tarleton	1945–1946	Republican	
5		Milton Andrew	1946		
6		Monte Snavely	1946	Democratic	
7		Harry T. Laugharn	1946–1953		
8		Frank G. Bussing	1953–1957	Republican	Unsuccessfully ran for election to the United States House of Representatives in 1954, losing to Democratic incumbent Clyde Doyle
9		Del M. Clawson	1957–1963	Republican	Most recent Republican mayor
10		Chester R. Crain	1963–1969	Democratic	Most recent white mayor
11		Douglas Dollarhide	1969–1973	Democratic	First black mayor
12		Doris A. Davis	1973–1977	Democratic	First female mayor
13		Lionel Cade	1977–1981	Democratic	
14		Walter R. Tucker, Jr.	1981–1990	Democratic	
15		Walter R. Tucker III	1991–1992	Democratic	Only black mayor elected to Congress from Compton
16		Omar Bradley	1993 – 2001		
17		Eric J. Perrodin	2001 – July 2, 2013		
18		Aja Brown	July 2, 2013 – June 30, 2021	Democratic	Youngest mayor elected
18		Emma Sharif	June 30, 2021 – present	Democratic	

While nearly 71% of Compton's residents are Hispanic or Latino American (2020), there is yet to be a Hispanic mayor.

== Mayoral races ==
(winners are in bold)

Year	Incumbent	Challenger
2013	Eric J. Perrodin	**Aja Brown**; 4,724
2009	**Eric J. Perrodin**; 3,041	Lynn Boone; 478
2005	**Eric J. Perrodin**; 3,548	Cecil W. Rhambo, Jr. 1,204
2001	Omar Bradley; 5,103	**Eric J. Perrodin**; 5,367
1997	**Omar Bradley**	Unknown
1993	**Omar Bradley**; 3,483	Patricia A. Moore; 3,134
1991*	**Walter R. Tucker III**; 2,389	Patricia A. Moore; 1,863
1989	**Walter R. Tucker, Jr.**	E. Boyd (Chuck) Esters
1985	**Walter R. Tucker, Jr.** 6,588	Maxcy D. Filer; 1,065
1981	Lionel Cade; 2,791	**Walter R. Tucker, Jr.** 4,338
1977	**Lionel Cade**; 3,494	Walter R. Tucker, Jr. 3,184
1973	Douglas Dollarhide; 4,867	**Doris A. Davis**; 6,063
1969	**Douglas Dollarhide**; 5,711	Walter R. Tucker, Jr. 4,072
1965	**Chester R. Crain**	Conway Cooke
1961	**Del Clawson**; 4,656	Unopposed
1953	**Frank G. Bussing**	Edmund F. Shaheen
1949	**Harry Laugharn**	Unknown
1933	C. A. Dickison; 855	**C. S. Smith**; 971
1929	**C. A. Dickison**; 1,001	Ivy Clark; 720

NOTE: If no incumbent, winner is listed first.

- (*) Special election to fill vacancy. Highest vote getter wins, even with less than 50% of vote.
