= Walter R. Tucker III =

American politician (born 1957)

Walter Tucker
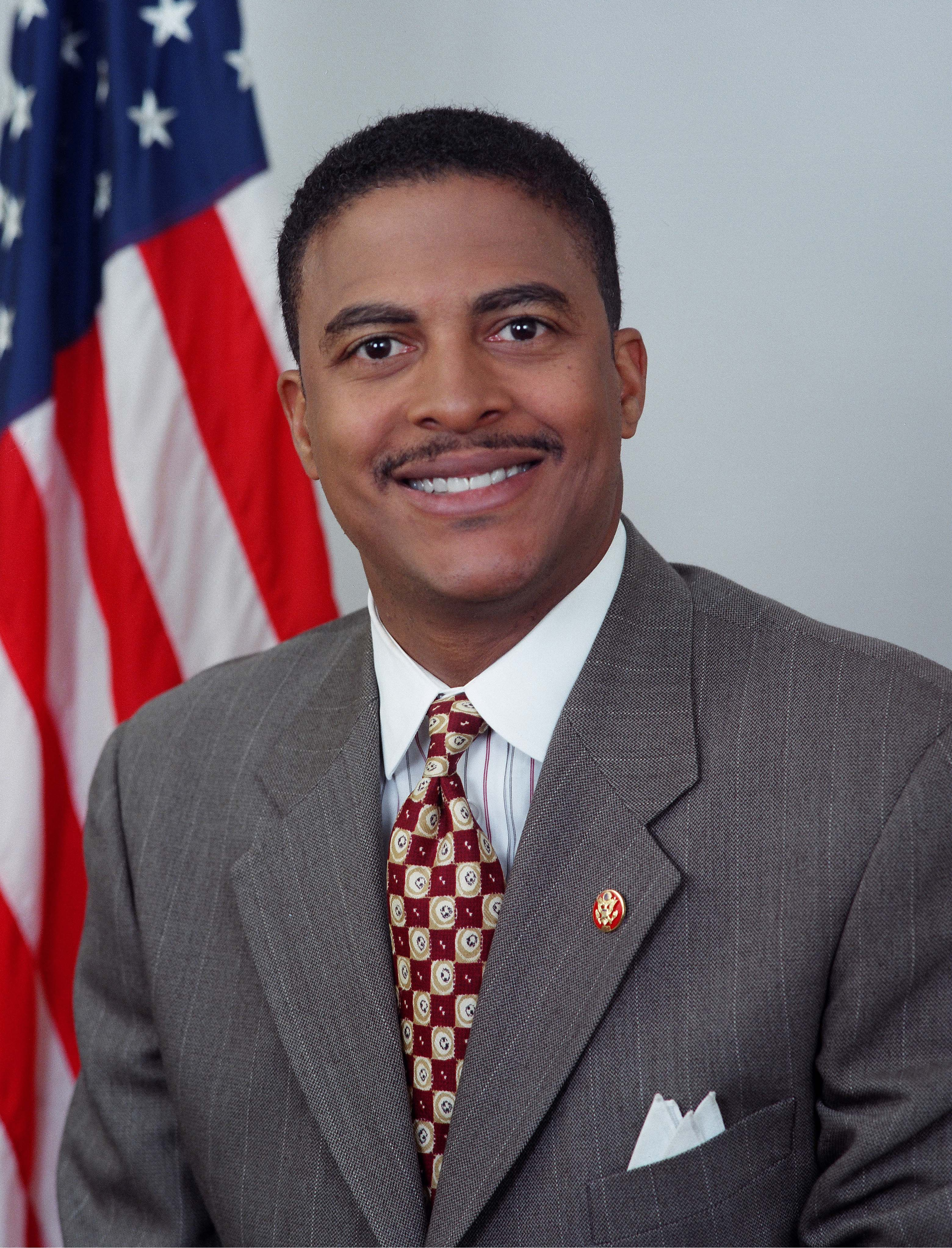

Member of the U.S. House of Representatives from California's 37th district
- In office January 3, 1993 – December 15, 1995
- Preceded by: Mervyn Dymally (redistricted)
- Succeeded by: Juanita Millender-McDonald

Mayor of Compton
- In office 1991–1992
- Preceded by: Walter R. Tucker Jr.
- Succeeded by: Omar Bradley

Personal details
- Born: Walter Rayford Tucker III; May 28, 1957 (age 69) Compton, California, U.S.
- Party: Democratic
- Education: Princeton University; University of Southern California (BA); Georgetown University (JD)

Walter Rayford Tucker III (born May 28, 1957) is an American lawyer, politician and minister who served as mayor of Compton and a one-term U.S. representative from California from 1993 to 1995.

== Parents and education ==
Tucker was born in Compton, California. He is the son of Walter R. Tucker, Jr. – a dentist who was the mayor of Compton beginning in 1981. The younger Tucker finished Compton High School in 1974 as the class valedictorian and attended Princeton University for the next two years. He graduated from the University of Southern California in 1978 with a degree in political science and earned his J.D. degree from Georgetown University Law Center in 1981. He was admitted to the California State Bar in 1984.

== Professional life ==
=== Legal practice and mayor of Compton ===
Tucker was a Los Angeles County deputy district attorney from 1984 to 1986, when he began in private practice as a criminal defense attorney. After Tucker's father died while still in office as mayor of Compton, the younger Tucker won a special election to replace him, becoming the youngest mayor in the city's history at age 33. He served from 1991 to 1992, during the civil unrest in Los Angeles County spawned by the Rodney King verdict.

== Congressional career ==
In 1992, Tucker was elected to the House of Representatives as a Democrat, defeating Lynn Dymally, the daughter of the retiring Representative Mervyn Dymally.

In Congress, Tucker served on the Committee on Public Works and Transportation and the House Small Business Committee, He introduced legislation promoting Random Acts of Kindness, opposed passage of the North American Free Trade Agreement (NAFTA), fought to save the Long Beach Naval Shipyard, and worked to ensure the successful development of the Alameda Corridor Project. He also worked with the Army Corps of Engineers to secure federal funding to repair the long neglected Compton Creek, thus eliminating the possibility of costly flood damage to the homes and property on either side of the waterway.

=== Criminal conviction and sentencing ===
In 1995, Tucker was convicted on seven counts of extortion and two counts of tax evasion. The charges stemmed from his acceptance of $30,000 in bribes during his tenure as Mayor of Compton in 1991, prior to his election to Congress. Tucker maintained his innocence throughout the trial, claiming he had been set up by government prosecutors targeting Black officeholders, although his conviction and sentence were upheld on appeal.

Tucker was sentenced to 27 months in prison by Federal District Court Judge Consuelo Bland Marshall. The sentence also included three years of supervised release following his imprisonment.

Tucker resigned from Congress after his conviction in 1995.

== Ministry ==
Tucker began his active ministry while at the Federal Prison Camp in Lompoc, California. After his release he was hired as the Helps Ministry manager for Crenshaw Christian Center in Los Angeles, and he then joined with Charles Colson's Prison Fellowship Ministry as Los Angeles area director. He moved with his family to Chicago, where for nine years he was a pastor of the From the Heart Church Ministries of Chicago. He is now the pastor of the Truth and Love Christian Church in Carson, California.

== Electoral history ==
1992 United States House of Representatives elections in California
Party	Candidate	Votes	%
Democratic	Walter R. Tucker III (Incumbent)	97,159	85.7
Peace and Freedom	B. Kwaku Duren	16,178	14.3
Total votes		113,337	100.0
Democratic hold			

1994 United States House of Representatives elections in California
Party	Candidate	Votes	%
Democratic	Walter R. Tucker III (Incumbent)	64,166	77.4
Libertarian	Guy Wilson	18,502	22.3
Independent	Lewis B Prulitsky (write-in)	263	0.3
Total votes		82,931	100.0
Democratic hold			

== Personal ==
Tucker is married to Robin Smith and they have two children – Walter R. Tucker IV and Autumn Monet Tucker. He has two sisters – Keta and Camillie, and a brother – Kenneth.

== See also ==
- List of African-American United States representatives

Political offices
Preceded by Walter R. Tucker Jr.	Mayor of Compton; 1991–1992	Succeeded by Omar Bradley
U.S. House of Representatives
Preceded by Al McCandless	Member of the U.S. House of Representatives from California's 37th congressional district 1993–1995	Succeeded by Juanita Millender-McDonald
U.S. order of precedence (ceremonial)
Preceded by Lynn Schenk as Former U.S. Representative	Order of precedence of the United States as Former U.S. Representative	Succeeded by Andrea Seastrand as Former U.S. Representative
