= Eagle Tree =

Historic tree in California

- The tree before it fell in 2022

- Location within the Los Angeles metropolitan area Location within California Location within the United States
- Species: California sycamore (Platanus racemosa)
- Location: 1706 N Short Ave, Compton, CA 90221
- Coordinates: 33.9077°N 118.2114°W
- Height: 70 ft (21 m) (1987)
- Girth: 20 ft (6.1 m) (1987)
- Diameter: 60 in (150 cm) (1859)
- Date seeded: c. 1672–1737
- Date felled: April 7, 2022

The Eagle Tree was a historic California sycamore (Platanus racemosa) tree near the crossing of Long Beach Boulevard and the I-105 in Compton, California. Originally named for the eagles that were found nesting in the tree, it was known for its status as the marker for the start of the territory of Rancho San Pedro. The tree, which started growing c. 1672–1737, fell in 2022, from a combination of disease and neglect.

== History ==
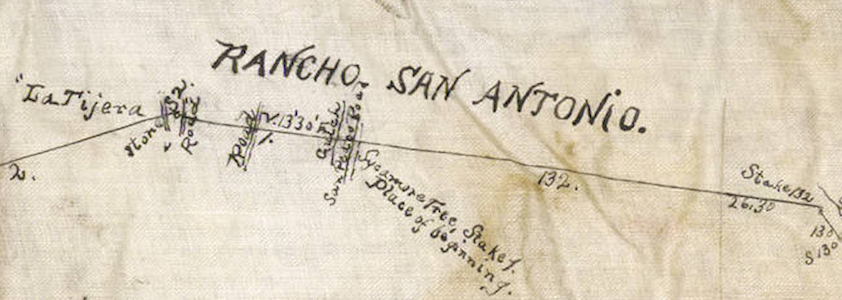
Henry Hancock notes a sycamore tree at the top of an 1859 map as the beginning of the territory of Rancho San Pedro.

The Eagle Tree was estimated to have been seeded c. 1672–1737. The significance of the tree dates back to December 1857, when it was first used as the natural boundary point in Mexican surveys to mark the extent of Rancho San Pedro. Many travelers also used it for navigational purposes, as it was a tall landmark amongst the many fields of mustard in the area and the only tree in the vicinity. A neighborhood formed near the tree in 1888, during the incorporation of the City of Compton. During this time, the tree was located near the intersection of Short Avenue and Poppy Avenue. The tree was threatened with removal in 1947 when Standard Oil sought to run an oil pipeline on the rancho's border. The Compton Parlor of the Native Daughters of the Golden West advocated for the protection of the tree, leading to a deal being made where the pipeline and the tree would share land. The Daughters, sponsored by Standard Oil, placed a historic marker and plaque there after the agreement.

Designation of the tree as a California Historic Landmark was proposed, but it was never completed. The tree and its accompanying plaque were repeatedly damaged in the 1980s through vandalism and attempts at arson; an apartment building adjacent to the tree was also built at this time. As of 1988, the tree was 70 ft (21 m) tall, with a 50 ft (15 m) canopy spread, and a trunk circumference of approximately 21 ft (6.4 m). Jesus Arroyo took care of the tree starting in 2009, when he moved into the apartment next door. One of the branches fell off the tree in 2015, crushing the roof of one of the apartment buildings. After the branch fell, the tree was trimmed by a company sent by the city, but the company ended up removing the entire canopy. An arborist on location found a large hole that stretched from the top of the tree to the trunk and believed that the tree was suffering from a fatal disease. They reported that intense care would have to be taken to keep the tree alive. In 2017, the tree stopped growing leaves, which may have been due to a lightning strike.

On April 7, 2022, at approximately 9:20 p.m., the Eagle Tree's main trunk fell over and crushed a car parked behind the apartment it covered. The main tree had died, but there was healthy, young growth surrounding the trunk. A young 30 ft (9.1 m) tall clone tree was found to be growing behind the fallen trunk as well. The 7 ton (6,400 kg) trunk was preserved and is stored in a space adjacent to Chevron property where, as of 2024, is in holding while plans are being made to display it as a historic resource. Arroyo wanted to take care of the new growths, but Chevron asked him to take the fence that he made to protect the plants down within a year, as it was blocking access to their property. Chevron soon took down the fence and constructed a higher fence that blocked Arroyo's ability to go on the company's property to take care of the plants.

On April 7, 2023, a Chevron work crew removed the clone tree, but cuttings for possible propagation in the future were taken. The cuttings were distributed to multiple arborist institutions, such as Huntington Library's Botanical Garden, the Theodore Payne Foundation and the California Botanic Garden. Chevron explained that the clone tree had the fusarium dieback disease transmitted by a tea shot-hole borer and needed to be removed. Many supporters of the tree advocated for a cutting being planted at the former site of the Eagle Tree, as the plaque had been left untouched. The Eagle Tree's cuttings were put in the care of North East Trees and were distributed to cities and historic sites in Southern California to keep the tree's legacy alive. The first cutting planted was at East Los Angeles College in 2024 as a part of an Earth Day celebration.

== See also ==
- List of individual trees

== Sources ==
- Hodel, Donald R. (1988). "Tree S-6". Exceptional Trees of Los Angeles. Arcadia, California: California Arboretum Foundation. ISBN 9780962112102. LCCN 88007548. OCLC 18556997.
