= Norman Flowers =

American serial killer (born 1974)

- Inmate mugshot
- Born: Norman Keith Flowers; March 15, 1974 (age 52); Compton, California, U.S.
- Motive: Rape
- Convictions: First degree murder (3 counts); Sexual assault First degree arson Robbery with a deadly weapon Burglary (2 counts)
- Penalty: 3 consecutive life sentences without the possibility of parole

Details
- Victims: 4
- Span of crimes: October 18, 2004 – May 4, 2005
- Country: United States
- State: Nevada
- Date apprehended: June 6, 2005
- Imprisoned at: High Desert State Prison, Clark County, Nevada

Norman Keith Flowers (born March 15, 1974) is an American serial killer who raped and strangled four women to death in their apartments in Las Vegas from 2004 to 2005. DNA left at each crime scene eventually linked him to the killings and he was arrested, convicted, and received three consecutive life sentences without the possibility of parole.

== Early life ==
Flowers was born on March 15, 1974, and raised in a dysfunctional family in Compton, California, an area known for poverty and violence. He experienced physical and sexual abuse and was once abandoned. In 1993, Flowers was convicted of burglary, robbery, and an arson-fire that killed a dog. In 1999, he was convicted of the unlawful use of a deadly weapon and burglary, crimes for which he was later released in 2003.

== Murders ==
Flowers' first victim was 28-year-old Keysha Brown, who he raped, stabbed, and strangled to death in her apartment on October 18, 2004. He left her body in her bathtub where it would be discovered the next day.

After this, Flowers met Debra Quarles, who he formed a relationship with. From there he met Quarles' daughter, Sheila, 18. He fathered a boy around this same time. They did, however, break up at some point. On March 24, 2005, Sheila stayed home from her job at a Starbucks, while Debra left for her job. Sometime during that day, Flowers let himself into the apartment and attacked Sheila in the apartment bathroom. He beat, raped, and strangled her to death. He left her body face up in the bathtub which was full of hot water. He then took her cell phone, bank card, and jewelry. Flowers left the apartment, and Debra found the body later that day. Police collected male DNA found in Sheila's vaginal area. In the weeks following, Flowers comforted Debra in the wake of her daughter's murder and recommended her to take counseling. Flowers started dating another woman, Mawusi Ragland, whom he had known since the early 1990s.

On May 4, Flowers killed his last two victims within eight hours of one another; he burglarized the apartment belonging to Marilee Coote, 45, whom he bludgeoned, assaulted, and strangled to death. Hours later, he knocked on the door of Juanita Curry, but she failed to answer. A few more hours later, Flowers burglarized another apartment, that of Rena Gonzalez, 25, whom he raped and strangled with a telephone cord. Later that night, Flowers attempted to kiss a woman in the same apartment complex, but she rejected his sexual advances.

== Arrest ==
Flowers was interviewed about the murders a few days later and denied committing them. With the help of DNA, Flowers was arrested on June 6, 2005, and charged with the murder of Marilee Coote. After his arrest, the string of murders suddenly stopped, and Flowers became the prime suspect, and, with DNA testing, he was linked to them and formally charged. DNA belonging to a second man was found on Sheila's body, later being matched to a man named George Brass; however, Brass came forward and stated that he was a friend of Sheila and that he had consensual sex with her. A local Walmart, where Brass worked, confirmed that he was working at the time of Sheila's murder, thus, he was cleared of suspicion. Flowers' attorneys argued in late June that, with damage to Coote's internal organs, she could have died accidentally during sex.

== Legal proceedings ==
Flowers went to trial for the murder of Sheila Quarles in 2008, with prosecutors seeking the death penalty against him. In October 2008, the jury found him guilty of Sheila's murder. In the sentencing phase of the trial, Flowers' mother Eleanor pleaded for the jury to not sentence him to death and argued that the son she knew was a caring, loyal young man. The jury dismissed the death sentence afterwards, and instead sentenced Flowers to life imprisonment without parole.

He was scheduled to head to trial for the murders of Coote and Gonzalez. In June 2011, Flowers entered an Alford plea, which allowed him to admit prosecutors had enough evidence to convict him without him having to confess. In August 2011, he was imposed two more life sentences. He is currently serving his sentence at High Desert State Prison in Clark County, Nevada.

In February 2023, Las Vegas police said they had found DNA evidence linking Flowers to Brown's murder.

== See also ==
- List of serial killers in the United States
