= C. A. Dickison =

American politician (1878–1965)

Clarence A. Dickison (July 28, 1878 – February 8, 1965) served as Mayor of Compton, California from 1924 until 1933.

== Biography ==
Clarence Anson Dickison is a native of the state of Missouri. He married Meda Kelso and this union produced two children. In 1924, he became mayor of Compton and served nine years. He lost re-election to C. S. Smith in 1933 by only 74 votes.

Dickison is the father of Jane D. Robbins, a longtime member of the Compton City Council, and a former principal of Dickison Elementary School.

He died February 8, 1965.

Political offices
| Preceded by Unknown | Mayor of Compton, California; 1924–1933 | Succeeded by C. S. Smith |
