= Del Clawson =

American politician (1914–1992)

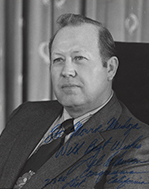

Member of the U.S. House of Representatives from California
- In office June 11, 1963 – December 31, 1978
- Preceded by: Clyde Doyle
- Succeeded by: Wayne R. Grisham
- Constituency: 23rd district (1963–1975); 33rd district (1975–1978)

Mayor of Compton
- In office 1957–1963
- Preceded by: Frank Bussing
- Succeeded by: Chester R. Crain

Personal details
- Born: Delwin Morgan Clawson; January 11, 1914 Thatcher, Arizona, U.S.
- Died: May 5, 1992 (aged 78) Downey, California, U.S.
- Party: Republican
- Education: Gila College (attended)

Delwin Morgan Clawson (January 11, 1914 – May 5, 1992) was an American politician. He was a member of the U.S. House of Representatives. He also served as mayor of Compton, California.

== Biography ==
Clawson was born in Thatcher, Arizona, and attended Gila College there in 1933 and 1934. He was manager of the Mutual Housing Association of Compton from 1947 to 1963.

=== Political career ===
Clawson was elected as a member of the City Council of Compton and served from 1953 to 1957. He then served as mayor of Compton, California, from 1957 to 1963.

=== Congress ===
After the death of Clyde Doyle, he was elected as a Republican to the 88th Congress, by special election. He was reelected to the seven succeeding Congresses and served until his retirement at the end of his last term on December 31, 1978.

== Personal life ==
Clawson was a Latter-day Saint. He was the son of Charles M. Clawson and Edna Allen.

== Death ==
Clawson died in Downey, California, on May 5, 1992.

== Electoral history ==
Del Clawson electoral history

1963 special election
Party	Candidate	Votes	%
Republican	Del M. Clawson		53.2%
Democratic	Carley V. Porter		35.4%
Democratic	Maurice H. Quigley		4.7%
Democratic	Armand R. Porter		2.7%
Democratic	James Earle Christo		1.4%
Democratic	Lynn W. Johnston		1.4%
Republican	Harold R. "Hal" Bennett		0.6%
Republican	Harry L. Butler		0.6%
Total votes			100.0%
Turnout			
Republican gain from Democratic			

1964 election
Party	Candidate	Votes	%
Republican	Del M. Clawson (Incumbent)	90,721	55.4%
Democratic	H. O. Van Pettin	72,903	44.6%
Total votes		163,624	100.0%
Turnout			
Republican hold			

1966 election
Party	Candidate	Votes	%
Republican	Del M. Clawson (Incumbent)	93,320	67.4%
Democratic	Ed O'Connor	45,141	32.6%
Total votes		138,461	100.0%
Turnout			
Republican hold			

1968 election
Party	Candidate	Votes	%
Republican	Del M. Clawson (Incumbent)	95,628	64.9%
Democratic	Jim Sperrazzo	51,606	35.1%
Total votes		147,234	100.0%
Turnout			
Republican hold			

1970 election
Party	Candidate	Votes	%
Republican	Del M. Clawson (Incumbent)	77,346	63.3%
Democratic	G. L. "Jerry" Chapman	44,767	36.7%
Total votes		122,113	100.0%
Turnout			
Republican hold			

1972 election
Party	Candidate	Votes	%
Republican	Del M. Clawson (Incumbent)	118,731	61.4%
Democratic	Conrad G. Tuohey	74,561	38.6%
Total votes		193,292	100.0%
Turnout			
Republican hold			

1974 United States House of Representatives elections in California
Party	Candidate	Votes	%
Republican	Del M. Clawson (Incumbent)	71,054	53.4
Democratic	Robert E. "Bob" White	57,423	43.1
American Independent	James C. "Jim" Griffin	4,636	3.5
Total votes		133,113	100.0
Republican hold			

1976 United States House of Representatives elections in California
Party	Candidate	Votes	%
Republican	Del M. Clawson (Incumbent)	95,398	55.1
Democratic	Ted Snyder	77,807	44.9
Total votes		173,205	100.0
Republican hold			

== See also ==
- List of members of the House Un-American Activities Committee

Political offices
Preceded by Frank G. Bussing	Mayor of Compton; 1957–1963	Succeeded by Chester R. Crain
U.S. House of Representatives
Preceded by Clyde Doyle	Member of the U.S. House of Representatives from California's 23rd congressional district 1963–1975	Succeeded by Thomas M. Rees
Preceded by Jerry L. Pettis	Member of the U.S. House of Representatives from California's 33rd congressional district 1975–1978	Succeeded by Wayne R. Grisham
Party political offices
Preceded by Ed Derwinski	Chair of the Republican Study Committee; 1973–1974	Succeeded by LaMar Baker
