= Spook Hunters =

White racist youth gang

The Spook Hunters were a white racist youth gang of South Gate, California, active from the 1940s to the 1950s. The gang was founded as a reaction to the growing African American population in the neighboring city of Los Angeles. The group's goal centered on work against integration and for racial segregation in communities. To reach these goals they started fights with and intimidated black youths. In response to these white racist gangs, the black youths formed their own gangs to protect themselves and their neighborhoods: The Slausons, the Businessmen, and the Gladiators were all formed as a direct reaction to attacks from white gangs like the Spook Hunters.
