= Eric J. Perrodin =

American politician (born 1959)

Eric Perrodin

Mayor of Compton, California
- In office 2001 – July 2, 2013
- Preceded by: Omar Bradley
- Succeeded by: Aja Brown

Personal details
- Born: Eric Joseph Perrodin; February 26, 1959 (age 67) Los Angeles County, California, U.S.
- Education: California State University, Dominguez Hills
- Occupation: Deputy District Attorney, police officer

Eric Joseph Perrodin (born February 26, 1959) is an American politician who served as Mayor of Compton, California from 2001 to 2013.

== Biography ==
Perrodin grew up in Compton, California. Soon after graduation from California State University, Dominguez Hills, he began working for the Compton Police Department. While serving as a police officer, he pursued a Juris Doctor degree at Loyola Law School. After 12 years with the department, Perrodin left to become a Deputy District Attorney for Los Angeles County.

In 2001, Perrodin defeated the incumbent mayor, Omar Bradley. He was re-elected in 2005 and 2009. He has the distinction of being Compton's longest-serving mayor.

In 2006, after a local paper printed an investigative report relative to a contract granted to one of Perrodin's associates. Following the report, Perrodin allegedly threatened to yank the city's advertising contract with the paper. The threat was probed by the Los Angeles Count District Attorney's office.

A Times review of city records shows Perrodin was absent from city board and commission meetings nearly two-thirds of the time between July 2009 and July 2010.

== 2013 Election ==
On June 4, 2013, Perrodin was defeated in Compton's municipal election by political newcomer Aja Brown. Brown went on to become the second female mayor (after Doris A. Davis) and the youngest mayor (at the age of 31) ever elected in Compton.

Political offices
Preceded by Omar Bradley	Mayor of Compton, California; 2001–2013	Succeeded by Aja Brown
