= Theodore Dollarhide =

American composer, conductor and music educator

Theodore (Ted) John Dollarhide (30 August 1948 – 20 April 2014) was an American composer, as well as conductor and music educator.

Dollarhide was born in Santa Rosa, California, to Violet (née Buonaccorsi) and father Jack. From the age of 7 he began to study the piano, two years later switched to the trumpet, and finally chose the tuba as his primary instrument. For a while he played the tuba in the US Air Force Band, before completing a degree in music composition at the San Jose State University, where he studied with Higo Harada.

Dollarhide subsequently studied at the University of Michigan, where his teachers included Leslie Bassett, William Bolcom and George Wilson. This was followed by a period of study in Paris with Eugene Kurtz (1978 to 1979), made possible by a Fulbright scholarship. Dollarhide's teaching positions included a lectureship at La Trobe University, Melbourne, Australia from 1981 to 1989, followed by two years as visiting professor of composition at Yonsei University in Seoul, Korea from 1987 to 1988).

Performances of Dollarhide's "large and varied output" include Other Dreams, Other Dreamers by the Detroit Symphony Orchestra in 1986, Madness in Paradise by the Elision ensemble in 1986), Shadows for woodwind quintet performed in London in 1986, and The Night Life performed by Robert Curry (piano) in Seoul in 1988.

Ted Dollarhide died, aged 65, at Grant's Pass, Oregon, USA, and was buried at the Sparlin Cemetery, Williams, Oregon.
