= Doris A. Davis =

American politician

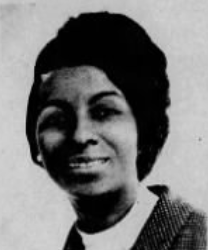

Mayor of Compton, California
- In office 1973–1977
- Preceded by: Douglas Dollarhide
- Succeeded by: Lionel Cade

City Clerk of Compton, California
- In office 1965–1973

Personal details
- Born: 1935 Waukegan, Illinois
- Died: February 19, 2018 (aged 82–83) Rancho Palos Verdes, CA
- Spouse(s): Dr. Davis (m. 1959; div. 1969) Earnest Preacely (m. 1970)
- Children: John Kennedy and Shedrick
- Parent(s): Ruby and Cornelius Collins

Doris A. Davis (ca. 1935 – February 19, 2018) was a mayor of Compton, California, who earned a place in history as the first African-American woman mayor of a metropolitan city in the United States.

== Early life and education ==
Davis was born in Waukegan, Illinois. Her parents were Ruby and Cornelius Collins, and they separated before Davis was five years old.

Davis graduated from Wendell Phillips Academy High School in Chicago, Illinois. She earned a Bachelor of Arts (B.A.) degree from Chicago Teachers College. Davis attended Northwestern University and earned a Master of Arts (M.A.) degree in educational administration.

In 1969, Davis and her first husband divorced. The following year, Davis married Earnest Preacely, who was the president of a management consulting firm.

== Political career ==
In 1965, 33-year-old Davis defeated incumbent Clyde Harland to become Compton's first Black City Clerk. In 1967, Davis founded the Daisy Child Development Centers, a non-profit organization helping unwed teenage mothers.

Davis won reelection in May 1972 with 83.8% of the vote. In 1973, she challenged and defeated incumbent Compton Mayor Douglas Dollarhide. By doing so, she became the first female African American Mayor of a major metropolitan city in the United States. She served one term and did not seek re-election.

Davis was succeeded in 1977 by another African-American, Lionel Cade, an accountant and former member of the city council, who also served only one term.

In 1986, Davis unsuccessfully ran for a seat in the California State Assembly, 54th District. She finished third in the Democratic primary.

Until 2013, Davis was the only female mayor in Compton's history. On June 4, 2013, Aja Brown was elected as Compton's second female mayor and the city's youngest mayor. In 2004, Alita Godwin became only the second black woman to serve as Compton City Clerk.

Political offices
Preceded by Clyde Harland	City Clerk, Compton, California; 1965–1973	Succeeded by Charles Davis
Preceded by Douglas Dollarhide	Mayor of Compton, California; 1973–1977	Succeeded by Lionel Cade

== See also ==
- List of first women mayors in the United States
- List of first African-American mayors
- African American mayors in California

== Sources ==
- Jet, June 11, 2001, vol. 99 issue 26, p. 19
- Los Angeles Herald-Examiner, "Distaff mayor determined in dream for Compton", November 11, 1973, pt. A, p. 10
- Los Angeles Herald-Examiner, "Compton's mayor Doris Davis speaks out", April 19, 1974, p. A-2
- Los Angeles Times, "Doris Davis running hard and fast", September 23, 1973, pt. 10, p1
