= Omar Bradley (politician) =

American politician (born 1958)

Mayor of Compton, California
- In office 1993–2001
- Preceded by: Walter R. Tucker III
- Succeeded by: Eric J. Perrodin

Member of the Compton (California) City Council from the 1st district
- In office 1991–1993
- Preceded by: Maxcy D. Filer
- Succeeded by: Ronald Green

Personal details
- Born: May 9, 1958 (age 68)
- Occupation: School teacher

Omar Bradley (born May 9, 1958) is an American politician who served as mayor of Compton, California from 1993 until 2001.

== Biography ==
Omar Bradley grew up in Compton, California. As an adult, he stayed ("lived") in the neighborhood and taught high school before entering politics.

In 1991, Bradley defeated Pedro Pallan to become City Councilman for the 1st District of Compton. Despite winning the race decisively with 2,904 votes over Pallan's 1,577, Bradley adopted a very conciliatory tone, when he said, "My first priority is to extend the olive branch to the Latino community, find out what they lack in city services and find out how to meet them."

Just two years later in the spring of 1993, Bradley faced off against Councilwoman Patricia A. Moore for the city's top job. In a bitterly fought runoff campaign, Bradley received just 349 votes over Moore to replace the outgoing Mayor Walter R. Tucker III. Immediately upon taking office, Bradley stirred controversy. During his campaign he had garnered the support of many Latino voters with the promise that if he were elected mayor, he would appoint a Latino to replace him on the council. It was generally assumed that he would appoint his former opponent Pallan, who was the first Latino in Compton to qualify for a run-off election. On the night of the presumed appointment, Bradley joined two other council members to appoint political newcomer Ronald Green, an African American instead.

That fall, comments he made regarding the violence in rap videos angered members of the Jewish community. When gangster rapper Eazy-E was seeking permission to film a music video in Compton, Bradley scolded him during a council meeting by saying that he was being exploited by a "specific ethnic group" that was "having a bar mitzvah at the same time." On October 13, 1993 he held a press conference with Eazy-E to announce his approval of the music video and to apologize for his previous remarks.

In 2001, Bradley narrowly lost his bid for re-election to a third term to political novice Eric J. Perrodin.

== Controversies ==
After leaving office, Bradley was investigated and convicted of misappropriating public funds during his tenure as City Mayor. Bradley was convicted of using a city-issued credit card to pay for golf rounds, hotel rooms, clothing and in-room movies, among other things. He was convicted of taking cash advances for city business expenses and then charging those items to his city credit cards and pocketing the money. Bradley charged over $3,800 in personal expenses on his City credit card, double-billed the City over $3,700 and in addition failed to return travel advances for two conferences that the jury could infer he failed to attend. The district attorneys office alleged that Bradley misspent closer to $19,000.

City Manager John D. Johnson II and council member Amen Rahh were convicted on similar charges of misappropriating public funds and were sentenced to prison.

On May 14, 2004 Bradley was sentenced to three years in state prison on felony corruption charges. Bradley served his time in a halfway house, from which he was allowed to leave five days a week to work in a job-training program for the developmentally disabled in Carson, California. Bradley was released in August 2005 because he had served jail time while awaiting trial. Bradley's corruption conviction was overturned by an appeals court in August 2012.

== 2013 Campaign for Mayor of Compton ==
Omar Bradley ran again for mayor of Compton, CA in 2013. He came in a close second in the primary nominating election on April 16, 2013. Bradley came in with 26.5% with Aja Brown receiving 27.8% of the vote. The incumbent mayor, Eric J. Perrodin, ended up in third place with only 24.5% of the vote. Brown defeated Bradley in the June 4 runoff by a 64% to 36% margin.

Political offices
Preceded by Maxcy D. Filer	Compton, California City Council; 1st District; 1991–1993	Succeeded by Ronald Green
Preceded by Walter R. Tucker III	Mayor of Compton, California; 1993–2001	Succeeded by Eric J. Perrodin
