= Aja Brown =

American politician (born 1982)

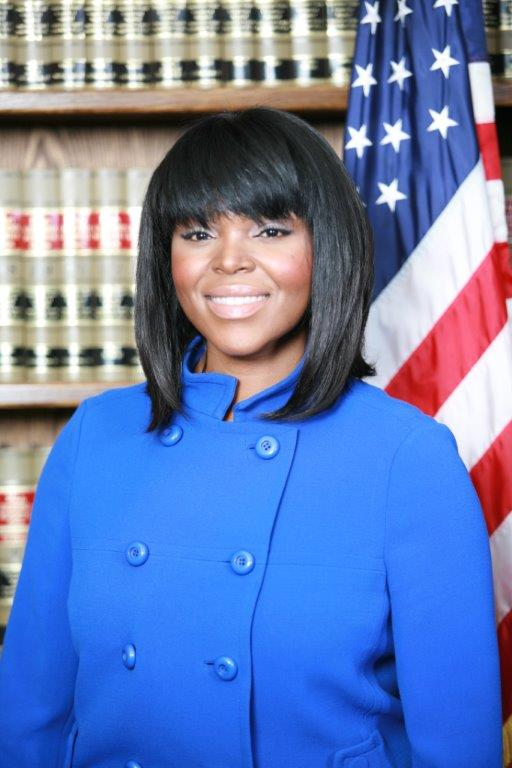

18th Mayor of Compton
- In office July 2, 2013 – June 30, 2021
- Preceded by: Eric J. Perrodin
- Succeeded by: Emma Sharif

Personal details
- Born: Aja Lena Clinkscale; April 17, 1982 (age 44) Altadena, California, U.S.
- Party: Democratic
- Relatives: Jonathan Clinkscale (twin)
- Education: University of Southern California (BS, MUP)

Aja Lena Brown (née Clinkscale; born April 17, 1982) is an American politician who was the mayor of Compton, California from 2013 to 2021. She won the election by defeating both incumbent mayor Eric J. Perrodin and former mayor Omar Bradley.

== Early life ==
Brown was born Aja Lena Clinkscale in Altadena, California, to a single mother, Brenda Jackson, who worked at the Jet Propulsion Laboratory at Caltech. Her parents divorced when she was young. She has a fraternal twin brother, Jonathan Clinkscale, who played football at the University of Wisconsin–Madison. Brown's mother grew up in East Compton.

In 2000, Brown graduated from John Muir High School in Pasadena, CA.

In 2004, Brown graduated from University of Southern California, where she received a full academic scholarship, with a bachelor's degree in policy, planning & development that included public policy, urban planning and development. In 2005, she earned a Master of Urban Planning, which included urban planning with a concentration in economic development. The subject of her master's thesis was an analysis of the 2004 failed development of a Walmart supercenter in Inglewood.

== Career ==
In 2004, while attending USC, Brown began working for the City of Gardena, California as an Economic Development Analyst.

In 2006, Brown began working for the City of Inglewood, California as an Urban Planner. In 2007, she served a term as a Planning Commissioner for the City of Pasadena, then resigned in 2009 to join Compton's Redevelopment Agency as a Redevelopment Project Manager, focusing her efforts on revitalizing the emergent City of Compton. She was responsible for creating community benefits legislation, initiating community-led downtown revitalization action committees, overseeing the Agency's urban planning and economic development initiatives. Brown also created and implemented Compton's Apprentice Program designed to create jobs for local residents on city-funded or assisted capital improvement projects.

In 2011, Brown co-founded the Urban Vision Community Development Corporation, a non-profit organization in Compton dedicated to community economic and youth development. Brown has also developed several re-branding programs that have achieved success in various cities, and she was awarded the "Best 2012 Communicator Design Award" for her "Yes!" campaign for the City of Compton. She has been instrumental in marketing Compton's buyer's program for first-time home buyers, as well as programs to attract expertise in land use and transportation.

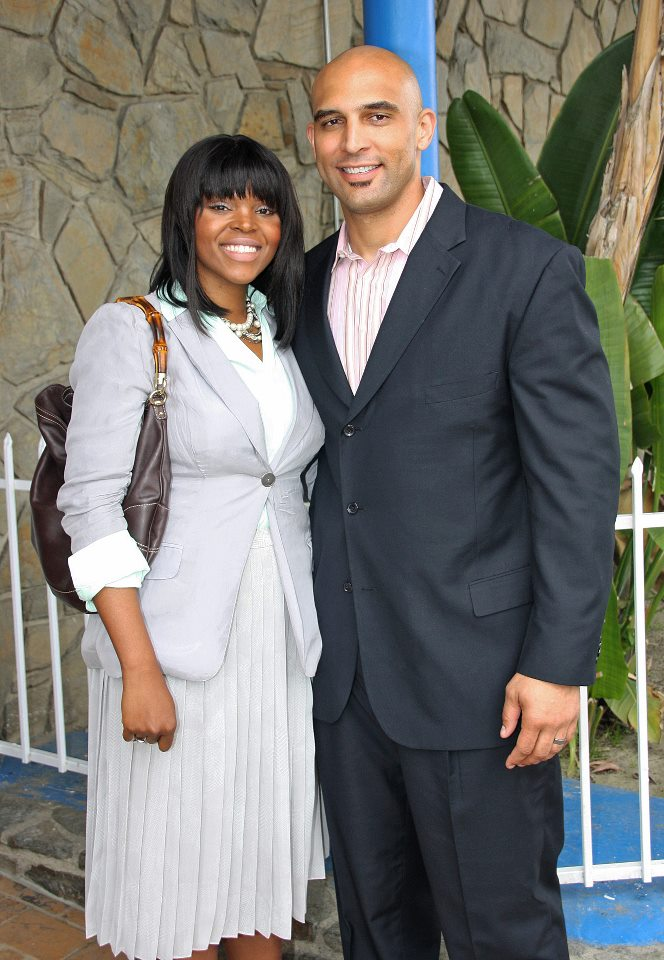
Mayor Brown and her husband, Van

== 2013–2021: Compton mayor ==
=== 2012 mayoral election ===
Having worked as a city employee for Compton, Brown decided in October 2012 to introduce what she called her "New Vision for Compton". A newcomer to politics, she defeated 12 candidates, including former mayor Omar Bradley and the incumbent mayor Eric J. Perrodin, to become the youngest mayor of Compton at age 31 and the 8th consecutive African-American elected as mayor.

=== 12-point strategy plan ===
Mayor Brown has launched a "12-point plan" designed to strategically advance the city of Compton. During Brown's tenure as a city employee, she recognized that the essential components needed to foster a healthy, thriving city were either outdated or non-existent. Addressing existing problems on multiple fronts, including youth development, infrastructure, working with educational coalitions and economic development, she says she has made her "12-Point Plan" accessible for the residents to follow along with the progress of the city.

=== Decrease in violence and crime ===
In 2014, Brown began reaching out to Compton Bloods and Crips gang leaders through former members to negotiate peace. She uses conflict mitigation instead of heavy policing. Since the gangs started regular meetings, violent activity and crime was reduced by about 65 percent compared to the all-time high some 25 years ago.

=== Congressional run ===
In 2018, she launched a campaign for the United States House of Representatives in California's 44th congressional district, against incumbent Nanette Barragán. A couple of months before the primary, Brown announced a withdrawal from the race due to her pregnancy with her first child. Nonetheless, her name remained on the ballot because her withdrawal came after the deadline. She advanced to the general election after ending up in second place with 10,257 votes (17% share of the votes). She lost the general election to Barragán, receiving only 45,378 votes (31.7%).

=== Compton Pledge guaranteed income ===
In 2021, the city began distributing monthly universal basic income payments to a “pre-verified” pool of low-income residents, in a two-year donor-funded program initiated by Brown, gauged for a maximum of 800 recipients, at which point it will be one of the larger among 25 U.S. cities exploring this approach to community economics.

== Personal life ==
Brown is married to Van Brown, a Petrochemical Safety Manager, whom she met and began dating in high school. Van Brown is a former University of Southern California football player. Brown and her husband moved to Compton in 2009. She and her husband are members of Faith Inspirational Missionary Baptist Church, where they work in community outreach programs. She gave birth to her first daughter in 2018.

In 1973, nine years before Brown's birth, her maternal grandmother, Lena Young, a nurse, was raped and murdered in a home invasion in Compton. As of 2013, the crime remained unsolved, with critics charging Brown of fabricating the story.

Brown's first name comes from the Steely Dan song, "Aja", the title track of the 1977 record, Aja, because it was a favorite of Brown's mother.

Political offices
Preceded by Eric J. Perrodin	Mayor of Compton; 2013–2021	Succeeded by Emma Sharif
