= Lionel Cade =

American politician (1918–1990)

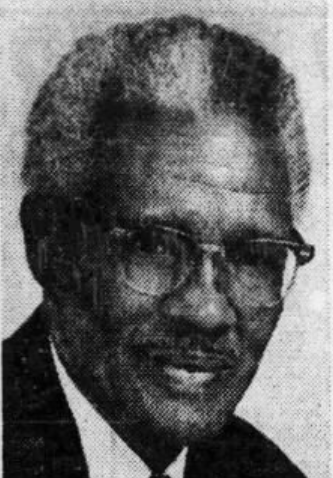

Mayor of Compton, California
- In office 1977–1981
- Preceded by: Doris A. Davis
- Succeeded by: Walter R. Tucker, Jr.

City Council of Compton, California
- In office 1964–1973

Personal details
- Born: August 14, 1918 Hardin County, Texas, U.S.
- Died: April 3, 1990 (aged 71)

Lionel B. Cade (August 14, 1918 – April 3, 1990) was an American politician and accountant who served as mayor of Compton, California, from 1977 until 1981.

== Biography ==
Cade was born in Hardin County, Texas, on August 14, 1918, the son of Charley and Virginia (Slocum) Cade.

Cade earned a bachelor's degree at the University of San Francisco and a master's from the University of Southern California.

During World War II, he was a member of the U.S. Army's first black paratroop battalion, the 555th. He also served his country during the Korean War.

=== Member of the Compton City Council (1964-1973) ===
When the Rev. Raul Imschweiler did not seek re-election to the Compton City Council in 1961, Cade ran for his seat. He lost to Robert Kerr by just 413 votes. In 1964, he was appointed to the Council, one of the first African Americans to serve there. He was elected to a four-year term the following year and reelected in 1969. He was a member of the council until 1973, when he made his first attempt as mayor. He finished third. Despite that defeat, he was successful on his second try in 1977.

=== Mayor of Compton (1977-1981) ===
An accountant by profession, Cade ordered an audit of the city's finances soon after he took office. He discovered that the city had accumulated $2 million of debt. This finding motivated Cade to initiate a series of cost-cutting measures, enabling the City to pay back its debt within one year. However, this deprived Cade of further room for maneuver after the vote of Proposition 13 in 1978, which was overwhelmingly approved by California voters. The proposition, which resulted in a 60% drop in property tax revenues in California, forced local governments to drastically reduce their spending - a challenge for Cade who had already eliminated much of the unnecessary spending from Compton's budget.

In his 1981 reelection campaign, Cade lost to his opponent, Walter R. Tucker, Jr., a local dentist. Cade later moved to Stockton, where he spent the remainder of his life with his wife.

=== Other offices ===
Other offices held by Cade during his 21 years in Compton include: president of the Chamber of Commerce, board member of the National Council of Campfire, and field deputy for state Sen. Ralph C. Dills. He was also active in the Rotary Club.

== Death ==
Cade died on April 3, 1990, from emphysema.

Political offices
Preceded by Doris A. Davis	Mayor of Compton, California; 1977–1981	Succeeded by Walter R. Tucker Jr.

== Sources ==
- Los Angeles Times, "Former Councilman and Mayor Lionel Cade Dies," April 12, 1990, page J-2.
- Miller, Gary J., Cities by Contract: The Politics of Municipal Incorporation, The MIT Press, Cambridge, Massachusetts and London, England, 1981
