= Douglas Dollarhide =

American politician

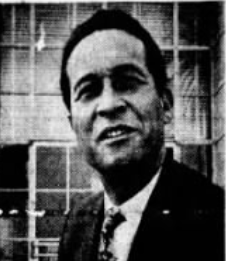

Mayor of Compton, California
- In office 1969–1973
- Preceded by: Chester R. Crain
- Succeeded by: Doris A. Davis

City Council of Compton, California
- In office 1963–1969

Personal details
- Born: March 11, 1923
- Died: June 28, 2008 (aged 85) Northridge, Los Angeles, California

Douglas Dollarhide (March 11, 1923 – June 28, 2008) was an American politician, notable for serving as the first African American mayor of Compton, California.

== Biography ==
Douglas F. Dollarhide witnessed first hand the transformation of Compton, California from a predominantly white Los Angeles suburb into one of the most heavily concentrated African American communities in the United States. He was elected to the City Council in 1963, becoming its first African American member.

In 1969, Dollarhide made history again, when he became the first black mayor of Compton. After his election crime rose and property values declined throughout Compton. He was defeated for reelection in 1973 by Doris Davis.

Compton's Dollarhide Neighborhood Center is named after him.

Dollarhide died on June 28, 2008, aged 85, at his home in Northridge in the San Fernando Valley.

== See also ==
- List of first African-American mayors
- African American mayors in California

Political offices
Preceded by Chester R. Crain	Mayor of Compton, California; 1969–1973	Succeeded by Doris A. Davis
