= Compton, California =

City in California, United States

- City
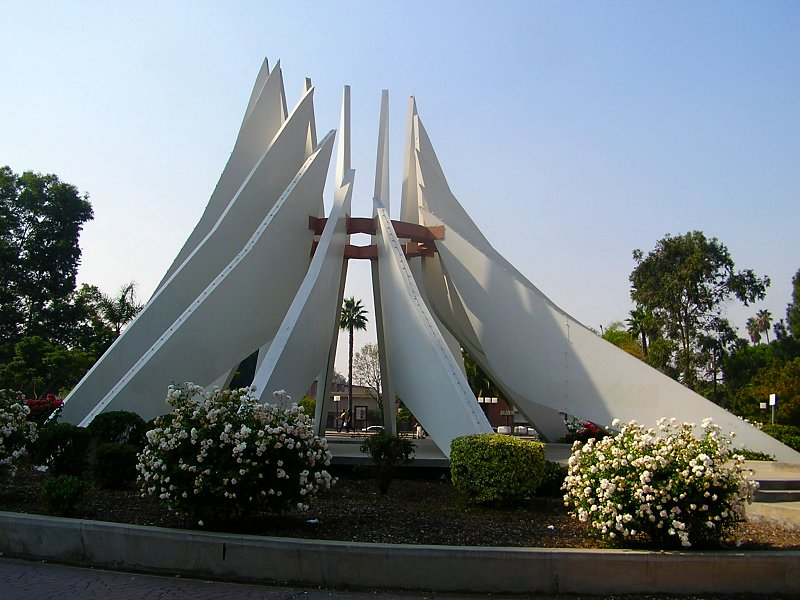
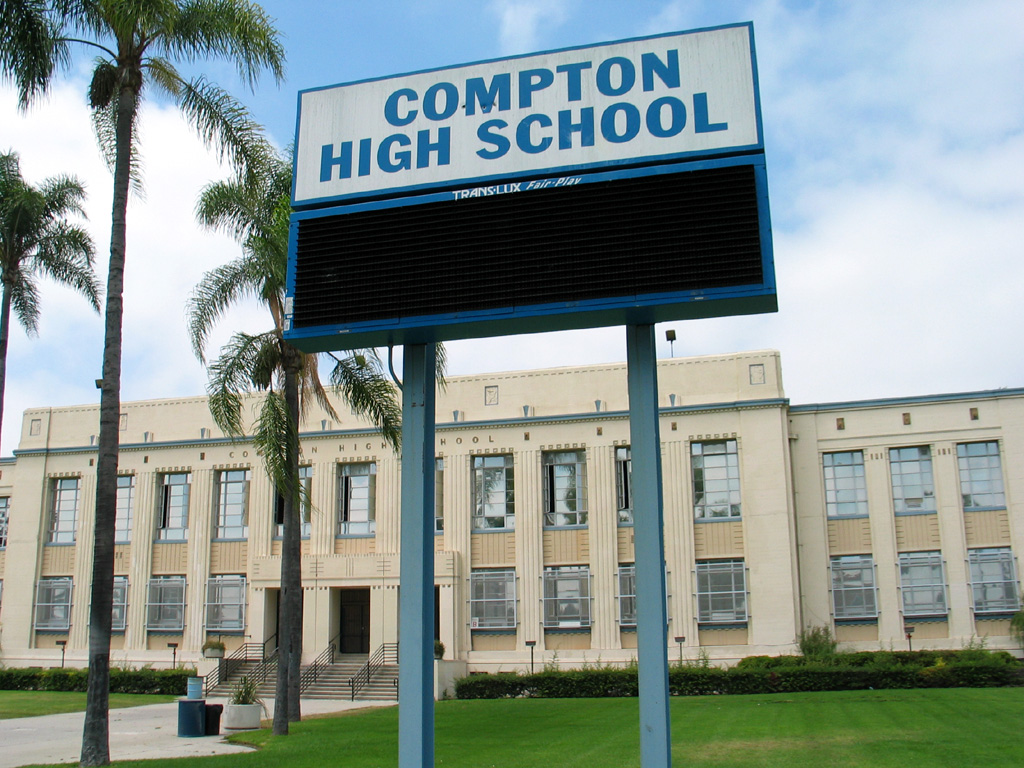
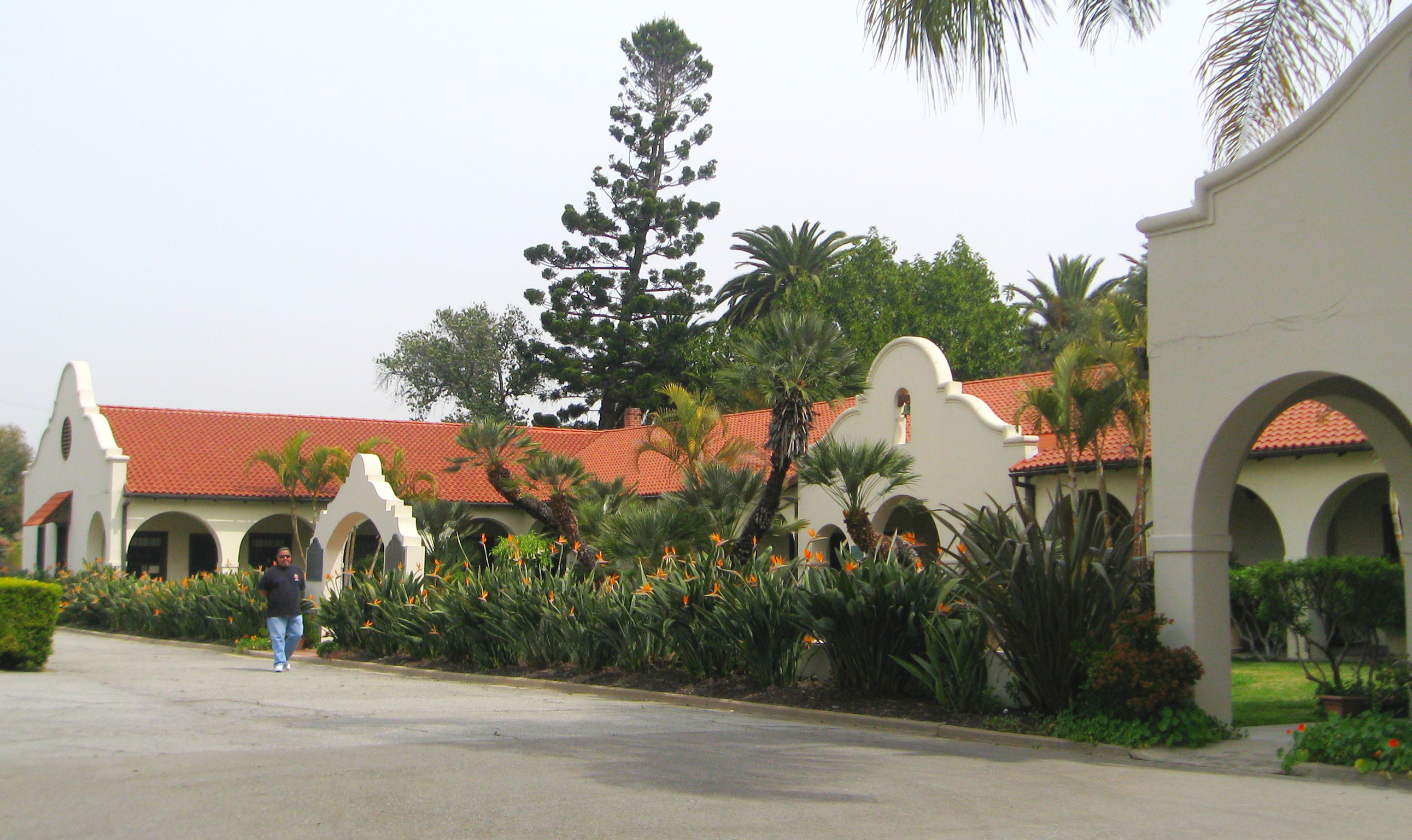
- Top: Martin Luther King, Jr. Memorial (left) and Compton High School (right); bottom: Dominguez Rancho Adobe.

- Seal
- Nickname: Hub City
- Motto: Birthing a New Compton
- Interactive map of Compton, California
- Location within Los Angeles Metropolitan Area Location within California Location within the United States
- Coordinates: 33°53′48″N 118°13′30″W
- Country: United States
- State: California
- County: Los Angeles
- Incorporated: May 11, 1888
- Named for: Griffith Dickenson Compton

Government
  - Type: Council-Manager
  - City Council: Deidre M. Duhart; Andre Spicer; Jonathan Bowers; Lillie P. Darden
  - Mayor: Emma Sharif
  - Mayor Pro Tem: Andre Spicer
  - City Manager: Willie A. Hopkins, Jr.
  - City Attorney: Vacant
  - City Treasurer: Brandon Mims

Area
  - Total: 10.12 sq mi (26.20 km^{2})
  - Land: 10.03 sq mi (25.97 km^{2})
  - Water: 0.089 sq mi (0.23 km^{2}) 1.03%
- Elevation: 69 ft (21 m)

Population (2020)
  - Total: 95,740
  - Rank: 88th in California
  - Density: 9,547.8/sq mi (3,686.42/km^{2})
- Time zone: UTC−8 (Pacific)
  - Summer (DST): UTC−7 (PDT)
- ZIP Codes: 90220–90224
- Area codes: 310/424
- FIPS code: 06-15044
- GNIS feature IDs: 1652689, 2410213
- Website: comptoncity.org

Compton is a city located in the Gateway Cities region of southern Los Angeles County, California, United States, situated south of downtown Los Angeles. Compton is one of the oldest cities in the county, and in May 1888, was the eighth city in Los Angeles County to incorporate. In the 2020 census, the city had a population of 95,740.

It is known as the "Hub City" due to its geographic centrality in Los Angeles County, though it is actually near the southern end of the county. Neighborhoods in Compton include Sunny Cove, Leland, downtown Compton, and Richland Farms.

== History ==
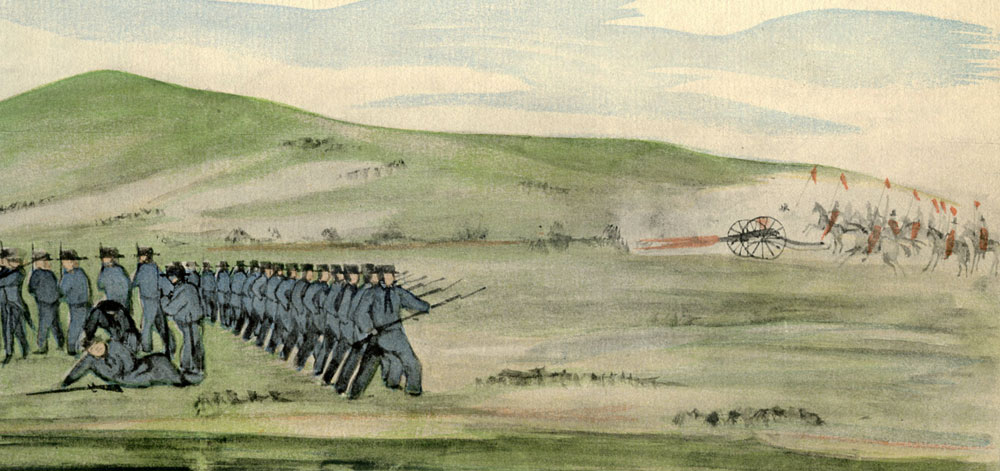
The Battle of Dominguez Rancho, 1846

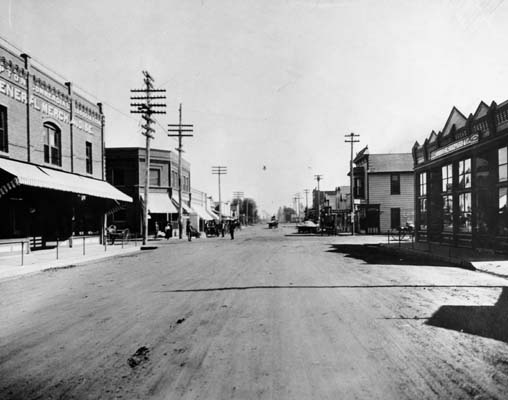
The Main Street of Compton, 1914

The Tongva Native Americans first lived in the area.

The Spanish Empire had expanded into this area when the Viceroy of New Spain commissioned Juan Rodríguez Cabrillo to explore the Pacific Ocean in 1542–1543. In 1767, the area became part of the Province of the Californias (Spanish: Provincia de las Californias), and the area was explored by the Portolá expedition in 1769–1770. In 1784, the Spanish Crown deeded Rancho San Pedro, a tract of over 75,000 acres (300 km^{2}), to soldier Juan José Domínguez.

Domínguez's descendants partitioned the land amongst family members, sold parcels to newly arriving settlers, and relinquished some when validating their legal claim with the Mexican government at 48,000 acres (190 km^{2}) in 1828, and with the United States government through a patent validating 43,119 acres (174.50 km^{2}) in 1858. The Domínguez family name is still applied throughout the area, including the Dominguez Rancho Adobe historical landmark, in the unincorporated community of Rancho Dominguez, located between the cities of Compton, Long Beach and Carson. The tree that marked the original northern boundary of the rancho still stands at the corner of Poppy and Short streets.

In 1867, Griffith Dickenson Compton led a group of 30 pioneers to the area. These families had traveled by wagon train south from Stockton, California, in search of ways to earn a living other than the rapid exhaustion of gold fields. Originally named Gibsonville, after one of the tract owners, it was later called Comptonville. To avoid confusion with the Camptonville located in Yuba County, the name was shortened to Compton.

Compton's earliest settlers were faced with terrible hardships as they farmed the land in bleak weather to get by with just the barest subsistence. The weather continued to be harsh, rainy and cold, and fuel was difficult to find. To gather firewood it was necessary to travel to mountains close to Pasadena. The round trip took almost a week. Many in the Compton party wanted to relocate to a friendlier climate and settle down, but as there were two general stores within traveling distance—one in the pueblo of Los Angeles, the other in Wilmington—they eventually decided to stay put.

By 1887, the settlers realized it was time to make improvements to the local government. A series of town meetings were held to discuss incorporation of their little town. Griffith D. Compton donated his land to incorporate and create the city of Compton in 1889, but he did stipulate that a certain acreage be zoned solely for agriculture and named Richland Farms. In January 1888, a petition supporting the incorporation of Compton was forwarded to the Los Angeles County Board of Supervisors, who in turn forwarded the petition to the State Legislature. On May 11, 1888, the city of Compton was incorporated with a population of 5000 people. The first City Council meeting was held on May 14, 1888.

In 1890, a series of votes were held by the residents of Compton, with the aim of shedding significant portions of the city. By the end of the year, Compton was down to only eighty acres of land, with five remaining voters residing within that territory. Due to the limited number of people able to fill positions within the city government, Compton effectively ceased to exist as a functioning city. By 1906, lawyers Emmett Wilson and E.T. Sherer filed suits to nullify the 1890 elections, which in turn restored Compton to a size of 600 acres (240 ha). Compton was reborn, with elections held to fill open positions.

The ample residential lots of Richland Farms gave residents enough space to raise a family, and food to feed them, along with building a barn, and caring for livestock. The farms attracted the black families who had begun migrating from the rural South in the 1950s, and there they found their 'home away from home'. Compton could not support large-scale agricultural business, but it did give the residents the opportunity to work the land for their families.

The 1920s saw the opening of the Compton Airport. Compton Junior College was founded and city officials moved to a new City Hall on Alameda Street. On March 10, 1933, a destructive earthquake caused many casualties: schools were destroyed and there was major damage to the central business district. While it would eventually be home to a large black population, in 1930 there was only one black resident.

From the 1920s through the early 1940s, the Compton area was home to a sizable Japanese American population, a large proportion of whom were farmers. Shortly after President Roosevelt issued Executive Order 9066 in February 1942, Compton residents of Japanese descent were forcibly removed from their homes and interned for the duration of World War II. Most were initially detained at the Santa Anita Assembly Center; they were later transferred to and incarcerated at Manzanar and other internment centers, called "Relocation Centers."

In the 1950s, middle-class Black families began moving into the area, mostly on the west side. Compton grew quickly throughout the decade. This is partially due to its proximity to Watts, where there was an established Black population. The eastern side of the city was predominantly white until the 1970s. Despite being located in the middle of a major metropolitan area, thanks to the legacy of Griffith D. Compton, there still remains one small pocket of agriculture from its earliest years.

During the 1950s and 1960s, after the Supreme Court declared all racially exclusive housing covenants (title deeds) unconstitutional in the case Shelley v. Kraemer, the first Black families moved to the area. Compton's growing Black population was still largely ignored and neglected by the city's elected officials. Centennial High School was finally built to accommodate a burgeoning student population. A Black man first ran for City Council in 1958, and the first Black councilman was elected in 1961.

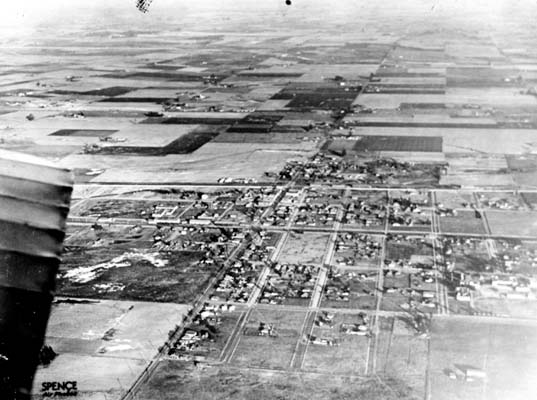
An aerial view of Compton, 1920

In 1969, Douglas Dollarhide became the mayor, the first Black man elected mayor of any metropolitan city in California. Two African Americans and one Mexican-American were also elected to the local school board. Four years later, in 1973, Doris A. Davis defeated Dollarhide's bid for re-election to become the first female black mayor of a metropolitan American city. By the early 1970s, the city had one of the largest concentrations of African Americans in the country, at over sixty five percent. In 2013, Aja Brown, age 31, became the city's youngest mayor to date; she was re-elected in 2017.

For many years, Compton was a much sought-after suburb for the Black middle class of Los Angeles. This past affluence is reflected in the area's appearance: Compton's streets are lined with relatively spacious and attractive single family houses. However, several factors have contributed to Compton's gradual decline. One of the most significant factors was a steady erosion of its tax base, something that was already sparse due to limited commercial properties. In later years, there were middle-class whites who fled to the newly incorporated cities of Artesia, Bellflower, Cerritos, Paramount and Norwalk in the late 1950s. These nearby cities remained largely white early on, despite integration. This white middle class flight accelerated following the 1965 Watts Riots and the 1992 Los Angeles riots.

By the late 1960s, middle-class and upper-middle-class African Americans found other areas to be more attractive to them. Some were unincorporated areas of Los Angeles County such as Ladera Heights, View Park and Windsor Hills, and others were cities such as Inglewood and Carson. Carson was particularly significant, because it had successfully thwarted attempts at annexation by neighboring Compton. The city opted instead for incorporation in 1968; notably, its Black population was actually more affluent than its white population. As a newer city, it also offered more favorable tax rates and lower crime.

White supremacist gangs instilled fear and terrorized Black and Hispanic communities across the region during the 1940s and 1950s, with The Spook Hunters being the most notorious among them. Nevertheless, the phenomenon of white flight commenced in the 1950s following a Supreme Court ruling in 1948 that invalidated discriminatory housing practices. Compton was also previously home to famous whites such as the Bush family.

== Geography and climate ==
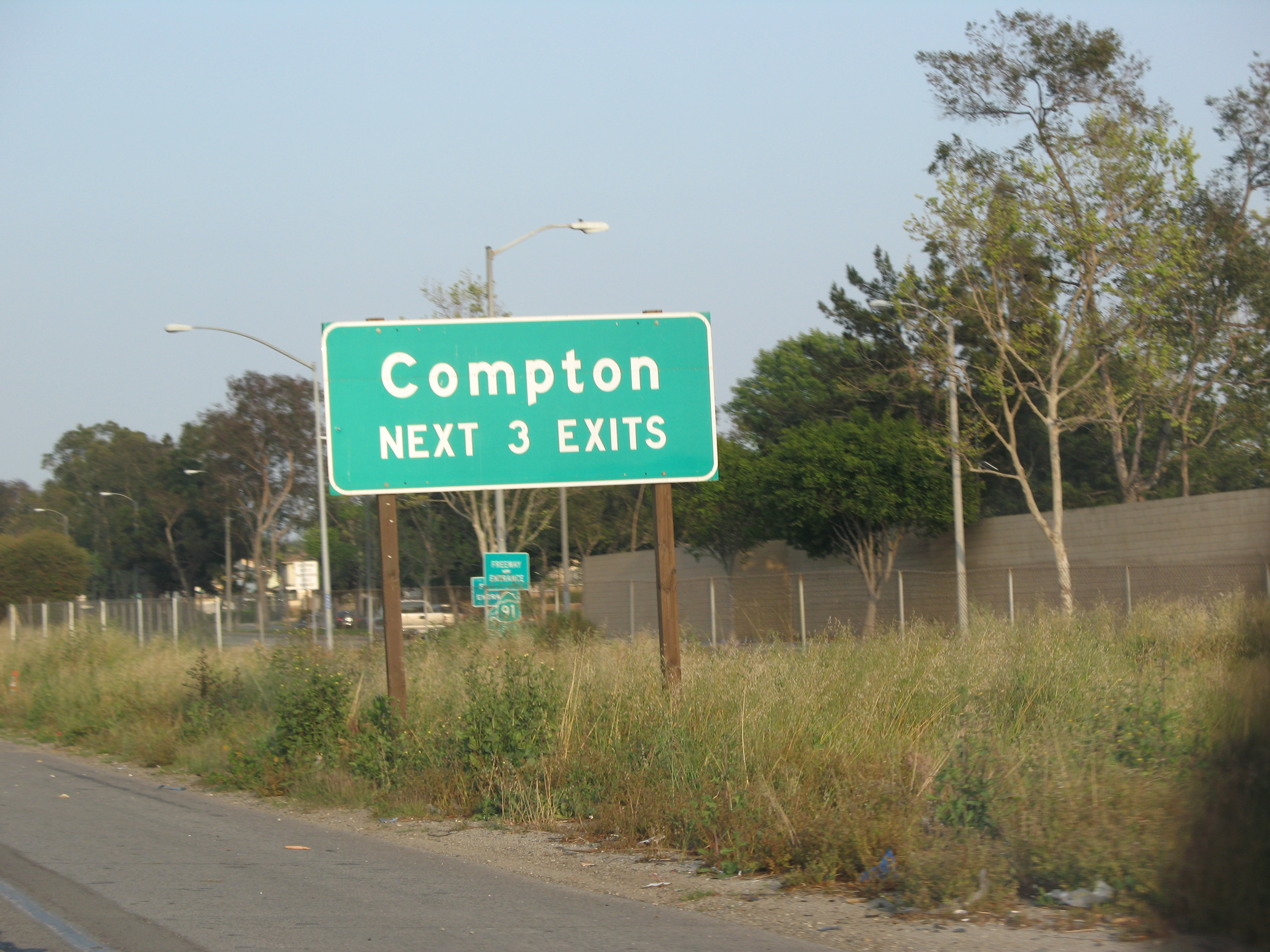
Highway sign for Compton on State Route 91

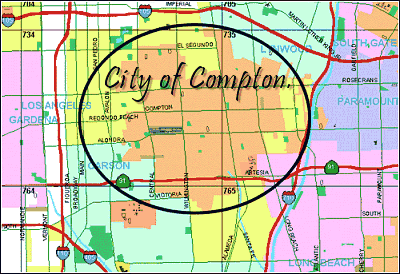
Map of Compton, c. 2001

According to the United States Census Bureau's 2020 data, the city has a total area of 10.1 square miles (26 km^{2}), of which 10.03 square miles (26.0 km^{2}) is land and 0.1 square miles (0.26 km^{2}) (1.03%) is water.

Compton is bordered by the unincorporated Willowbrook on the north and northwest, the unincorporated West Compton on the west, the city of Carson on the southwest, the unincorporated Rancho Dominguez on the south, the city of Long Beach on the southeast, the city of Paramount and the unincorporated East Compton on the east, and by the city of Lynwood on the northeast.

=== East Compton ===
East Compton, also known as East Rancho Dominguez, is a predominantly industrial unincorporated community and census-designated place (CDP). The population was 15,135 in the 2010 Census. East Rancho Dominguez is an accepted city name according to the USPS, and shares the 90221 ZIP Code with Compton. Its sphere of influence is the city of Compton, which has tried to annex East Rancho Dominguez, but business and property owners in the area have opposed attempts at annexation.

=== Climate ===
Climate data for Compton, California
Month	Jan	Feb	Mar	Apr	May	Jun	Jul	Aug	Sep	Oct	Nov	Dec	Year
Record high °F (°C)	93 (34)	91 (33)	98 (37)	105 (41)	104 (40)	108 (42)	109 (43)	105 (41)	111 (44)	111 (44)	101 (38)	91 (33)	111 (44)
Mean daily maximum °F (°C)	67 (19)	68 (20)	68 (20)	72 (22)	73 (23)	77 (25)	81 (27)	82 (28)	81 (27)	77 (25)	72 (22)	68 (20)	74 (23)
Mean daily minimum °F (°C)	46 (8)	48 (9)	50 (10)	53 (12)	57 (14)	60 (16)	63 (17)	64 (18)	63 (17)	58 (14)	51 (11)	46 (8)	55 (13)
Record low °F (°C)	25 (−4)	33 (1)	33 (1)	38 (3)	40 (4)	46 (8)	51 (11)	54 (12)	50 (10)	39 (4)	34 (1)	28 (−2)	25 (−4)
Average precipitation inches (mm)	3.21 (82)	3.32 (84)	2.68 (68)	0.68 (17)	0.24 (6.1)	0.08 (2.0)	0.02 (0.51)	0.12 (3.0)	0.25 (6.4)	0.40 (10)	1.15 (29)	1.81 (46)	13.96 (355)

== Demographics ==
Historical population
Census	Pop.	Note	%±
1870	160		—
1890	636		—
1910	922		—
1920	1,478		60.3%
1930	12,516		746.8%
1940	16,198		29.4%
1950	47,991		196.3%
1960	71,812		49.6%
1970	78,547		9.4%
1980	81,350		3.6%
1990	90,454		11.2%
2000	93,493		3.4%
2010	96,455		3.2%
2020	95,740		−0.7%
U.S. Decennial Census; 1850–1870 1880–1890; 1900 1910 1920; 1930 1940 1950; 1960 1970 1980; 1990 2000 2010; 2020

Compton first appeared as a city in the 1870 United States census.

=== Racial and ethnic composition ===
Historical Racial Profile	2020	2010	2000	1990	1980	1970	1960	1950
White (NH)	0.9%	0.8%	1.0%	1.5%	2.7%	14.6%	50.9%	91.7%
Black (NH)	25.4%	32.1%	39.9%	52.7%	73.9%	71.0%	39.3%	4.5%
Hispanic or Latino (NH)	70.8%	65.0%	56.8%	43.7%	21.1%	13.6%	9.0%	3.5%
Asian (NH)	0.4%	0.2%	0.2%	1.7%	1.7%	0.4%	0.5%	0.1%

Compton city, California – Racial and ethnic composition Note: the US Census treats Hispanic/Latino as an ethnic category. This table excludes Latinos from the racial categories and assigns them to a separate category. Hispanics/Latinos may be of any race.
Race / Ethnicity (NH = Non-Hispanic)	Pop 1980	Pop 1990	Pop 2000	Pop 2010	Pop 2020	% 1980	% 1990	% 2000	% 2010	% 2020
White (NH)	2,191	1,321	954	782	856	2.69%	1.46%	1.02%	0.81%	0.89%
Black or African American (NH)	60,096	47,680	37,263	30,992	24,342	73.87%	52.71%	39.86%	32.13%	25.43%
Native American or Alaska Native (NH)	162	116	170	175	132	0.2%	0.13%	0.18%	0.18%	0.14%
Asian (NH)	1,382	1,525	189	222	365	1.7%	1.69%	0.2%	0.23%	0.38%
Native Hawaiian or Pacific Islander alone (NH)	– (Note: Under Asian.)	–	953	684	544	–	–	1.02%	0.71%	0.57%
Other race alone (NH)	293	302	100	140	440	0.36%	0.33%	0.11%	0.15%	0.46%
Mixed race or Multiracial (NH)	– (Note: Not included as census option until 2000.)	–	721	791	1,270	–	–	0.77%	0.82%	1.33%
Hispanic or Latino (any race)	17,162	39,510	53,143	62,669	67,791	21.1%	43.68%	56.84%	64.97%	70.81%
Total	81,350	90,454	93,493	96,455	95,740	100.00%	100.00%	100.00%	100.00%	100.00%

=== 2020 census ===
In the 2020 census, Compton had a population of 95,740. The median age was 32.0 years. 27.8% of residents were under the age of 18 and 9.9% of residents were 65 years of age or older. For every 100 females, there were 94.5 males, and for every 100 females age 18 and over there were 91.0 males age 18 and over.

100.0% of residents lived in urban areas, while 0.0% lived in rural areas.

There were 24,085 households in Compton, of which 50.1% had children under the age of 18 living in them. Of all households, 42.5% were married-couple households, 16.3% were households with a male householder and no spouse or partner present, and 33.0% were households with a female householder and no spouse or partner present. About 13.7% of all households were made up of individuals and 6.0% had someone living alone who was 65 years of age or older.

There were 24,739 housing units, of which 2.6% were vacant. The homeowner vacancy rate was 0.7% and the rental vacancy rate was 2.6%.

=== 2010 census ===
The 2010 United States census reported that Compton had a population of 96,455. The population density was 9,534.3 inhabitants per square mile (3,681.2/km^{2}). The racial makeup of Compton was 31,688 (32.9%) Black; 24,942 (25.9%) White, (0.8% Non-Hispanic White); 655 (0.7%) Native American; 292 (0.3%) Asian; 718 (0.7%) Pacific Islander; 34,914 (36.2%) from other races; and 3,246 (3.4%) from two or more races. Hispanic or Latino of any race were 62,669 persons (65.0%).

The Census reported that 95,700 people (99.2% of the population) lived in households, 643 (0.7%) lived in non-institutionalized group quarters, and 112 (0.1%) were institutionalized.

There were 23,062 households, out of which 13,376 (58.0%) had children under the age of 18 living in them, 10,536 (45.7%) were opposite-sex married couples living together, 6,373 (27.6%) had a female householder with no husband present, 2,354 (10.2%) had a male householder with no wife present. There were 1,725 (7.5%) unmarried opposite-sex partnerships, and 158 (0.7%) same-sex married couples or partnerships. 2,979 households (12.9%) were made up of individuals, and 1,224 (5.3%) had someone living alone who was 65 years of age or older. The average household size was 4.15. There were 19,263 families (83.5% of all households); the average family size was 4.41.

The age distribution of the population was as follows: 31,945 people (33.1%) under the age of 18, 11,901 people (12.3%) aged 18 to 24, 26,573 people (27.5%) aged 25 to 44, 18,838 people (19.5%) aged 45 to 64, and 7,198 people (7.5%) who were 65 years of age or older. The median age was 28.0 years. For every 100 females, there were 94.8 males. For every 100 females age 18 and over, there were 90.7 males.

There were 24,523 housing units at an average density of 2,424.0 units per square mile (935.9 units/km^{2}), of which 12,726 (55.2%) were owner-occupied, and 10,336 (44.8%) were occupied by renters. The homeowner vacancy rate was 2.9%; the rental vacancy rate was 5.9%. 53,525 people (55.5% of the population) lived in owner-occupied housing units and 42,175 people (43.7%) lived in rental housing units.

During 2009–2013, Compton has a median household income of $42,953, with 26.3% of the population living below the federal poverty line.

=== Crime ===
Following the Watts riots in 1965, crime in Compton rose sharply. Although the city was largely exempt from the destruction of the 1965 riot, it prompted middle-class residents to flee over the next few years in white flight. By 1969, it had the highest crime rate in the state of California.

In Black, Brown, and White: Stories Straight Outta Compton, Lynne Isbell and two friends from other ethnic backgrounds have written about their lives growing up in Compton during the 1960s and early 1970s. They tell how Compton changed from a mostly white town to a mostly Black one and gained a reputation as "the Murder Capital of the United States".

Compton's violent reputation reached the national spotlight in the late 1980s with the rise of local gangsta rap groups Compton's Most Wanted and N.W.A, the latter of whom released the album Straight Outta Compton in 1989. The city became notorious for gang violence, primarily caused by the Bloods and Crips. After years of decline in crime, Compton's murder rate skyrocketed in 2004 with racial conflicts between Blacks and Latinos.

The neighborhood lost residents with the worsening safety problems and, after the 1992 riots in the Los Angeles metropolitan area, many African Americans left the city.

The city's deadliest year on record was 2005, when the city's murder rate reached 72 killings with a total population of 90,000 residents. The spike was the highest since 1991, when the city had more than 100,000 residents. The rise in homicides frightened residents who had long lived with high levels of gang violence but had seen a downturn in violent crime in recent years.

Although U.S. News & World Report did not list Compton in the 2011 "11 Most Dangerous Cities" for overall crime rates in the United States, the CQ Press, using data from the FBI's annual report of crime statistics "Crime in the United States 2010," which ranked Compton as having the eighth highest crime rate in the country.

Compton experienced a drop in homicide in the late 1990s and 2000s. Crime has stabilized overall since the 2010s. The decrease in homicides has been attributed to various factors, including changing demographics, faster response times by police (reducing shots fired) and better medical care (increasing survival rates). Aja Brown, mayor elected in 2013, helped to settle turf wars between the gangs, which has further reduced the homicide rate.

In 2013, the homicide rate was 36.8 per 100,000 residents, a decrease from the mid-2000s peak. Guns are used in the vast majority of homicides in Compton. Between 2000 and 2016, 91.5% were killed with guns compared to the national average of 67.7%. In 2015, there was a record low of 15 homicides while the homicide rate in the rest of the US increased. In recent years, homicides have increased while remaining well below the 1980s and 90s, with 32 in 2021.

Mexican and Central American immigrants have increasingly replaced African Americans who moved to different cities.

Compton has recently experienced a dramatic decline in homicide rates with only 18 in 2025

==== "Gifts for Guns" ====
The Los Angeles Sheriff's Department began the annual "Gifts for Guns" program in the year 2005, where the citizens of Compton were given the option to turn in firearms and receive a $50–$100 check for various goods in an effort to combat gun violence. People have turned in about 7,000 guns over the last few years, KABC-TV reported. The program's success has prompted the LASD to expand the program countywide.

=== Homelessness ===
In 2022, Los Angeles Homeless Services Authority's Greater Los Angeles Homeless Count counted 644 homeless individuals in Compton.

Homeless population
Year	Pop.	±%
2016	383	—
2017	384	+0.3%
2018	365	−4.9%
2019	430	+17.8%
2020	652	+51.6%
2022	644	−1.2%
Source: Greater Los Angeles Homeless Count; Los Angeles Homeless Services Authority

=== Civil unrest and federal deployment (2025) ===
In June 2025, Compton was among several communities in Los Angeles County where demonstrations occurred following immigration enforcement actions by U.S. Immigration and Customs Enforcement (ICE). According to reports, some protesters in Compton threw glass bottles at law enforcement officers.

On June 8, the National Guard was deployed to Los Angeles County, including Compton, under orders from President Donald Trump. The deployment occurred without a formal request from the governor of California, marking a rare instance of federal activation of the state’s National Guard.

=== Mapping L.A. ===
Mexican was the most common ancestry according to the 2000 census. Mexico and El Salvador were the most common foreign places of birth in 2000.

== Economy ==
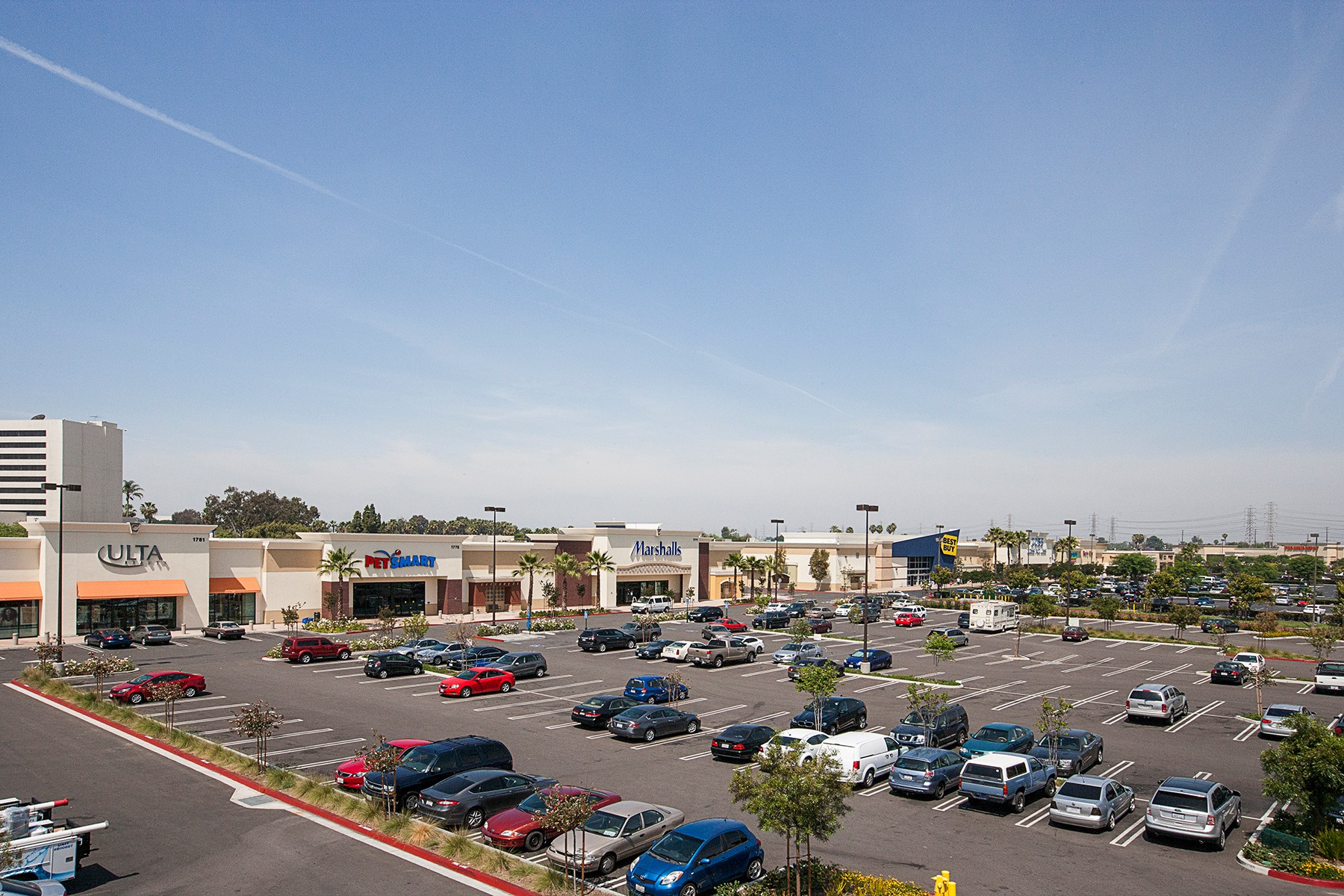
Gateway Towne Center

In 1994, Compton was designated as an "Entrepreneurial Hot Spot" by Cognetics, Inc., an independent economic research firm. Compton made the national list for best places to start and grow a business, and ranked #2 in Los Angeles County out of a field of 88 cities. The city's Planning and Economic Development department provides a business assistance program consisting of a comprehensive mix of resources to small business owners and entrepreneurs. The grocery chains Ralphs and Food 4 Less, subsidiaries of Kroger, are headquartered in Compton. Gelson's Market, a subsidiary of Arden Group, Inc., a holding company, is also based there.

Compton is surrounded by freeways that provide access to destinations throughout the region. The Long Beach and Los Angeles Ports are less than 20 minutes from downtown Compton, providing access to international destinations for customers and suppliers. The Alameda Corridor, a passageway for 25% of all U.S. waterborne international trade, runs directly through Compton from north to south.

The City of Compton's Parks and Recreation Department operates and maintains a total of 16 playgrounds for a combined 118 acres (48 ha) of active park space. Facilities include six community centers, seven neighborhood parks, two walking parks, two competition-size swimming pools, three regulation size gymnasiums, a skate park, Jackie Robinson Baseball Stadium, Nine-Hole Par 3 Golf Course, and the two-story 29,641 square feet (2,800 m^{2}) Douglas F. Dollarhide Community Center.

== Arts and culture ==
Many rap artists' careers began in Compton, including N.W.A (Eazy-E, MC Ren, Dr. Dre, Ice Cube, DJ Yella), Coolio, DJ Quik, 2nd II None, Hi-C, Tweedy Bird Loc, The Game, Kendrick Lamar, YG, Vince Staples, Roddy Ricch, The Pharcyde (Imani) and Compton's Most Wanted. In their lyrics, they often reflect on the streets and their lives in Compton and the surrounding areas. Steve Lacy and blues musician Keb' Mo' are also from Compton.

Compton has been referenced on numerous occasions in gang affiliation, gangsta rap and g-funk songs, particularly in the late 1980s and throughout the 1990s. This has shaped its cultural association with both hip-hop and depictions of gang violence and crime. The Compton Swap Meet is featured prominently in the remix version of the 1995 song "California Love".

Championed by the Compton Entertainment Chamber of Commerce, the city of Compton honoured rapper Eazy-E with a symbolic street named after his stage name. On November 22, 2023, the 100 block of Auto Drive South, which runs off Alameda Street into the Gateway Towne Center shopping plaza, was renamed Eazy Street, also referencing a song of the same name.

Eazy-E rose to prominence as part of N.W.A, a group that helped launch hip-hop artists including Eazy-E, Ice Cube, Dr. Dre, MC Ren and DJ Yella. In 1989, N.W.A released the major hit "Straight Outta Compton", which became a widely recognised global catchphrase for the city. (Eric Lynn Wright was born September 7, 1964, in Compton, and died March 26, 1995.)

Some episodes of the sitcom The Fresh Prince of Bel-Air took place in Compton because Will Smith's friend, DJ Jazzy Jeff, lived there.

Many NBA players attended high school in the city as well. Arron Afflalo attended Centennial High School; DeMar DeRozan attended Compton High School; and Tayshaun Prince, Tyson Chandler, Brandon Jennings, Cedric Ceballos and the late Dennis Johnson attended Dominguez High. Actor/comedian Paul Rodriguez Sr. also attended Dominguez High.

Although an inner suburb of Los Angeles, Compton has seen an increase in middle-class residents in the last few years, due to its affordable housing. With the influx of immigrants and the demographic shift in ethnic population, it was after the 2000 U.S. census that Latinos were recognized as the majority.

Compton has evolved into a younger population; the median age of people living in Compton was 25 at the time of the census survey in 2010; the United States average at the time was 35.3.

Compton is home to the Compton Cricket Club, the only all American-born exhibition cricket team. Its founder, Ted Hayes, said, "The aim of playing cricket is to teach people how to respect themselves and respect authority so they stop killing each other." Tam's Burgers has been seen as a symbol of the city.

=== Historical landmarks ===
Angeles Abbey Memorial Park contains examples of Byzantine, Moorish and Spanish architectural styles. The cemetery was built in 1923 and survived the 1933 Long Beach earthquake.

Compton Airport opened on May 10, 1924. Located on Alondra Boulevard, the airport offers flight training, has accommodations for more than 200 planes, and is home to several aviation clubs.

The Martin Luther King, Jr. Memorial sits in a plaza surrounded by the Civic Center, Compton Court House, Compton City Hall, and Compton Public Library.

The Eagle Tree was a natural boundary marker of Rancho San Pedro dating to 1858. It contains a historic marker and plaque placed by the Daughters of the Golden West in 1947.

The 'Heritage House' was built in 1869 and is a California Historical Landmark, and a Los Angeles County Historic Landmark. As the oldest house in Compton, it was restored as a tribute to early settlers. Located at the corner of Myrrh and Willowbrook near the Civic Center Plaza, the Heritage House is a rustic-looking home that will eventually house a museum detailing early life in Compton. For now, it shows the stark difference between the simple life of the 19th century and the fast-paced urban environment of the 21st. The oldest tree in Compton was the Eagle Tree, which marked the boundary of Rancho San Pedro. It fell in 2022.

Woodlawn Memorial Park contains the graves of 17 American Civil War veterans.

== Government ==
=== Municipal government ===
After Lionel Cade, an accountant, assumed the mayor's office in 1977, one of the first orders of business was to conduct an audit of the city's finances. It was discovered that the city was $2 million in debt. The administration was able to eliminate the huge deficit in one year by making cuts in every department. It also aggressively sought federal funding to help pay for essential services, which was at least partially effective. However, with the passage of the property tax cutting initiative Proposition 13 by California voters, Compton was one of the cities hardest hit, since it had already eliminated most of the excess from its budget.

==== Corruption ====
Civic corruption has also been a widespread problem in Compton.

In 2000, the Compton Police Department was disbanded amidst controversy and charges of corruption. The police department claims it was disbanded after investigations of gang activity led to then-Compton Mayor Omar Bradley. Once this became public, the mayor charged it was the police who were themselves corrupt, and he disbanded the police department. Omar Bradley has since faced serious corruption charges.

Eric J. Perrodin, the city's former mayor, was investigated in 2007 by the California State Bar for threatening to violate a local newspaper's First Amendment rights after the paper printed an investigative report relative to a contract granted to one of Perrodin's associates. Following the report, Perrodin threatened to yank the city's advertising contract with the paper. A Times review of city records shows Perrodin was absent from city board and commission meetings nearly two-thirds of the time between July 2009 and July 2010.

Recall efforts were a direct response from residents to the accusations of corruption of the city's mayor and council. Some of the accusations involving the issuing of city contracts to personal donors and friends. One particular accusation involved the trash and recycling contract of the city to Pacific Coast Waste and Recycling LLC in 2007.

Notices of intent to circulate recall petitions against four Compton city officials were to be filed in August 2010, by a group of citizens who claim corruption in Compton was being ignored by the same authorities who were shocked by the recent salary controversy in the city of Bell.

Later in 2010, Compton had discharged its city manager, the second time in three years. The Los Angeles Times says the City Council voted in a closed meeting, September 9, 2010, to fire Charles Evans. The Times says council members refused to discuss the reasons for their decision. Evans took office in 2007, after the dismissal of previous City Manager Barbara Kilroy. City Controller Willie Norfleet will take over until a permanent manager can be named.

In July 2021, U.S. Representative Maxine Waters called for a Department of Justice inquiry into whether a deputy gang called the Executioners was operating out of the Compton station of the LASD.

=== State and federal representation ===
In the state legislature, Compton is in the 35th senatorial district, represented by Democrat Laura Richardson, and in the 65th Assembly district, represented by Democrat Mike Gipson.

In the U.S. House of Representatives, Compton is in California's 43rd congressional district, represented by Democrat Maxine Waters.

== Education ==
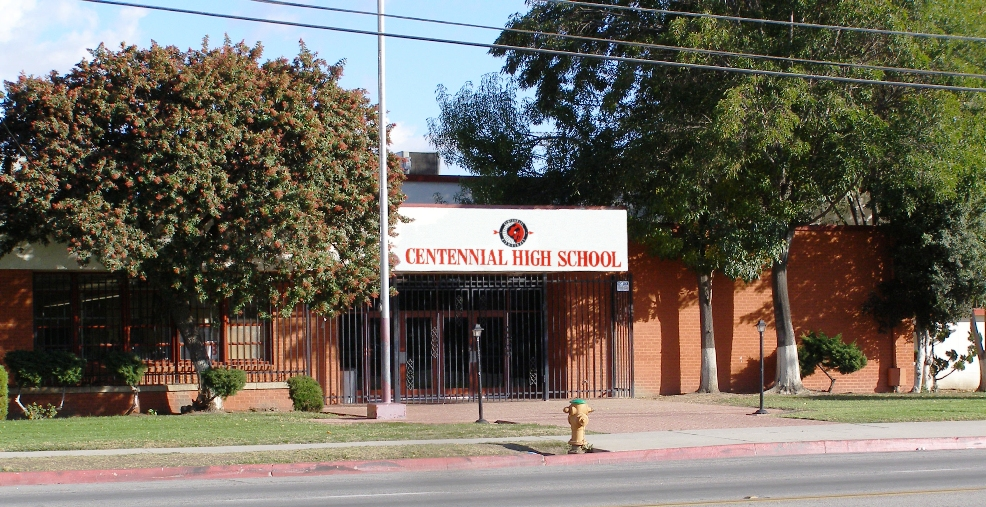
Centennial High School

The city is served by Compton Unified School District. All of Compton is in CUSD, except for a small sliver of land in the Paramount Unified School District. The CUSD district is a participant of the FOCUS program conducted by the University of California, Irvine. The goals of the program are to improve mathematics and science achievement by uniting the efforts of mathematics, science, education and research library faculty and staff with educators of the school district.

The CUSD provides public education for grades K–12. The district operates 24 elementary schools, eight middle schools, three high schools, and one adult school, which also serves as an alternative school. The district maintains five alternative learning schools.

The four high schools of the CUSD are Centennial High School, Compton Early College High School, Dominguez High School, and Compton High School.

The city is also served by Compton College, which offers community college courses for those planning to enter a four-year degree program, as well as those seeking further education in specific trade fields.

The Compton Library offers adult, children's and Spanish language materials; reference services; a Literacy Center and a Homework Center; public computers with Internet access and word processing capabilities; public typewriters; and a bilingual story time every Saturday at 12:00 noon.

Occidental's Center for Food and Justice and its Compton Farm-to-School project were featured in a segment of Life and Times, a half-hour news program on PBS member television station KCET in Los Angeles.

Barack Obama Charter School is a kindergarten through sixth grade public charter school.

== Infrastructure ==
The Los Angeles County Department of Health Services operates the South Health Center in Watts, Los Angeles, serving Compton.

The United States Postal Service operates the Compton Post Office at 701 South Santa Fe Avenue, and the Hub City Post Office at 101 South Willowbrook Avenue.

=== Law enforcement ===
The Los Angeles County Sheriff's Department operates the Compton Station in Compton. When the LASD replaced the Compton Police Department in 2000, they increased patrol service hours from 127,410 to 141,692. Compton Station is centrally located in the Los Angeles area. The station is easily accessible from the Century Freeway (I-105) to the north, the Gardena Freeway (SR-91) to the south, the Harbor Freeway (I-110) to the west, and the Long Beach Freeway (I-710) to the east. Diane Walker, a 30-year veteran of the Los Angeles County Sheriff's Department, was promoted to the rank of captain by Sheriff Lee Baca, and is now commander of Compton Station. There is also a LASD substation located in the Gateway Town Center.

=== Transportation ===
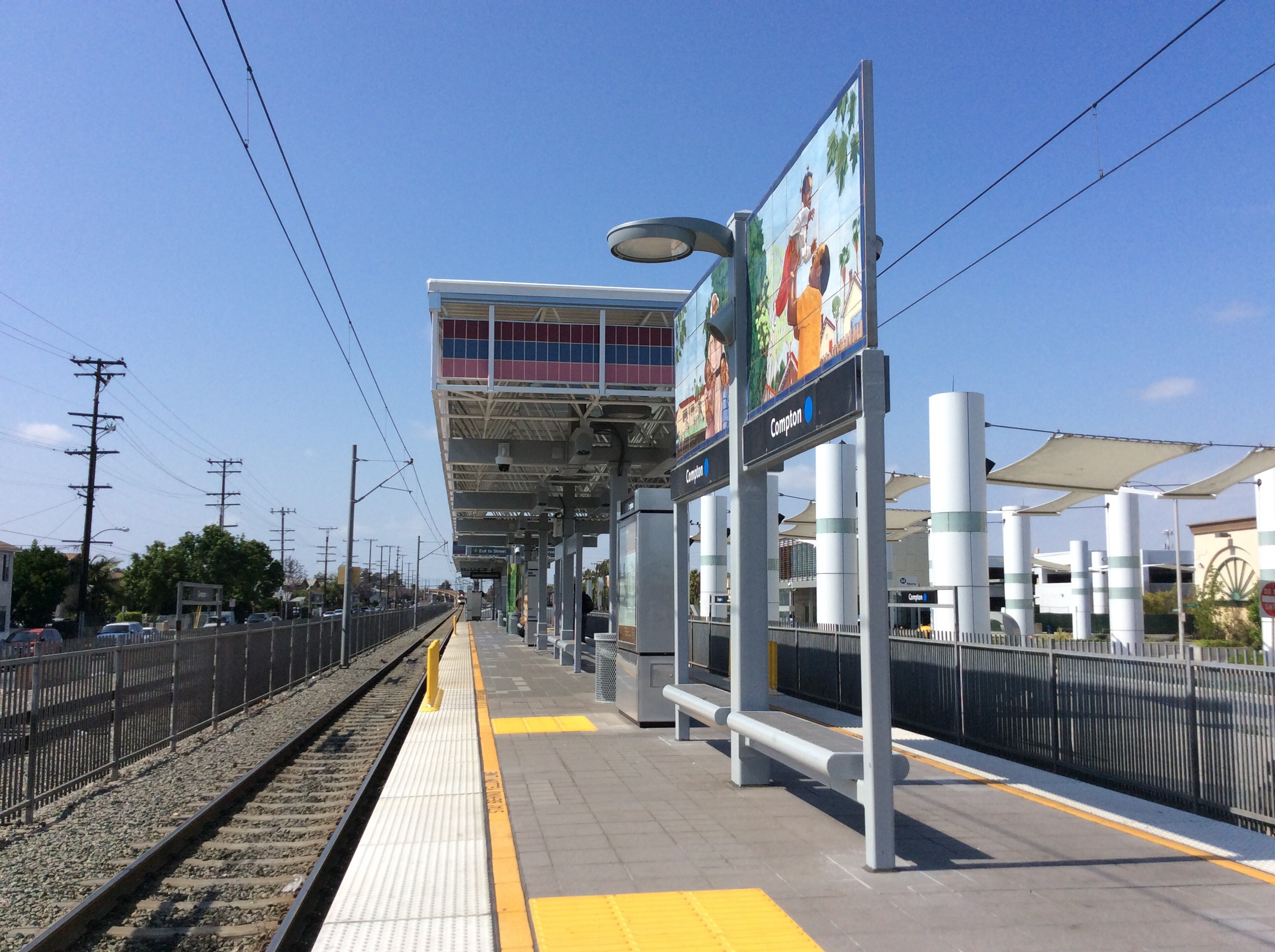
Compton station of the LA Metro

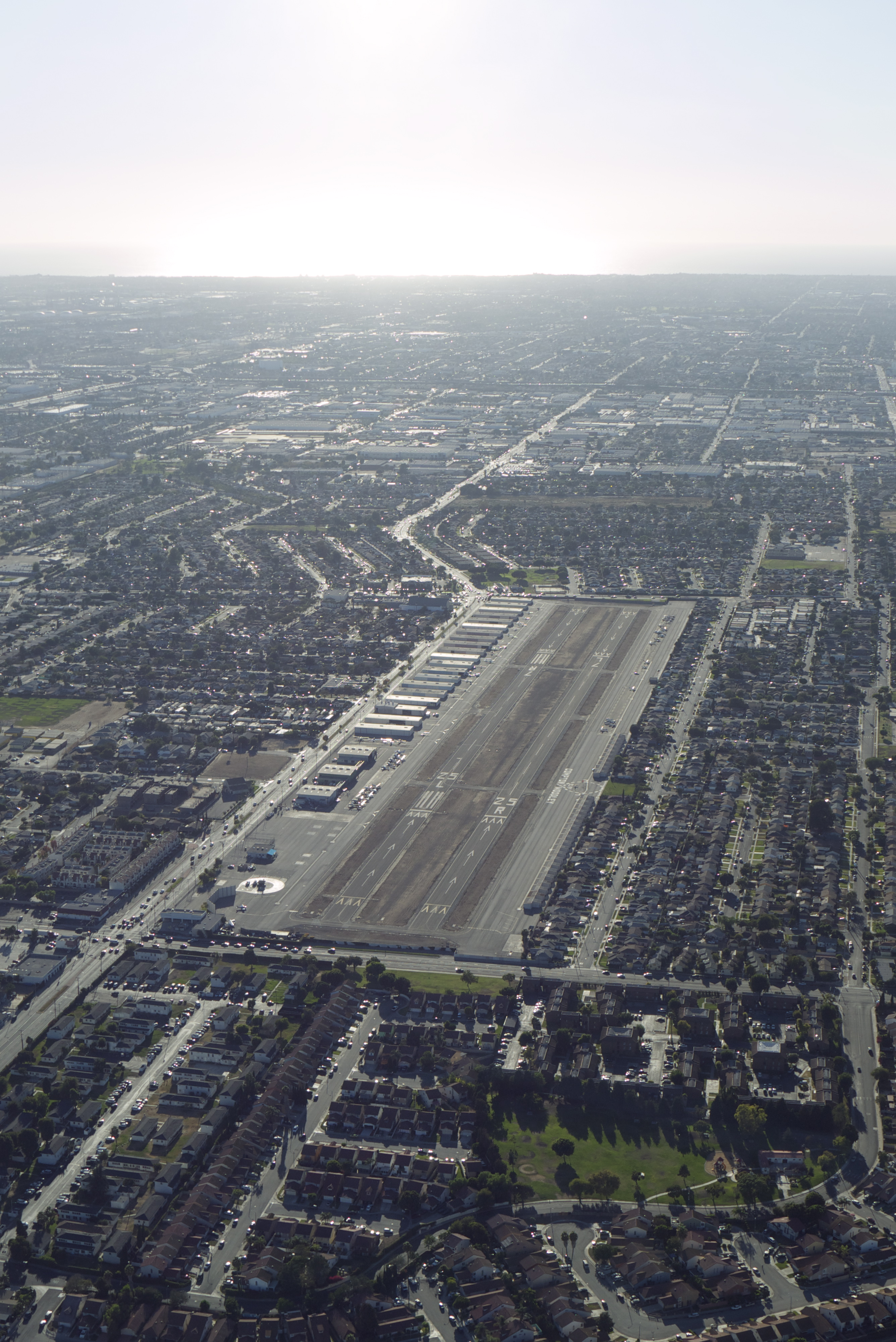
Compton/Woodley Airport

Four freeways are within or near the city's boundaries and provide access to destinations throughout the region. Interstate 710 runs through the eastern boundary, State Route 91 runs through the southern boundary. Interstate 105 runs slightly along the north of the city, and Interstate 110 along to the west.

The Metro A Line (formerly the Blue Line) light rail runs north–south through Compton. Compton station is in the heart of the city, adjacent to the Renaissance Shopping Center. Artesia station serves the southern part of the city. The A Line connects Compton to downtown Los Angeles and downtown Long Beach.

There is also a Compton Renaissance Transit System that serves the area.

Compton/Woodley Airport is a small general aviation airport located in the city. The airport lies within busy airspace, as it is situated within a few miles of both Los Angeles International Airport and Long Beach Airport.

Greyhound Lines operates the Compton station.

Collectively, these multifaceted transportation links lend justification to the city's familiar nickname of "the Hub City."

From 1902 to 1961, Compton was served by the Pacific Electric Long Beach Line.

== Sister cities ==
On January 19, 2010, the Compton City Council passed a resolution creating a sister cities program, to be managed as a chapter of the Compton Chamber of Commerce. The city has established partnerships:

- Apia, Samoa (2010)
- Onitsha, Nigeria (2010)
- Torrejon de Ardoz, Spain (2010)

== See also ==
- List of cities in Los Angeles County, California
