= University of California =

Public university system in California

- Motto: Fiat lux (Latin)
- Motto in English: Let there be light
- Type: Public research university system
- Established: March 23, 1868; 158 years ago
- Endowment: $29.5 billion (2024)
- Budget: $53.6 billion (2024–2025)
- President: James Milliken
- Faculty: 26,100 (February 2025)
- Administrative staff: 192,400 (February 2025)
- Students: 299,407 (February 2025)
- Undergraduates: 236,070 (February 2025)
- Postgraduates: 63,337 (February 2025)
- Location: Oakland (Office of the President), California, United States; 37°48′08″N 122°16′17″W
- Campus: 10 campuses under direct control (9 with undergraduate and graduate schools, one professional/graduate only), one affiliated law school, and one national laboratory
- Colors: Blue and gold
- Website: universityofcalifornia.edu
- The location of the office of the president in Oakland, California

The University of California (UC) is California's system of public research universities. Headquartered in Oakland, the system is composed of ten campuses at Berkeley, Davis, Irvine, Los Angeles, Merced, Riverside, San Diego, San Francisco, Santa Barbara, and Santa Cruz. The system is the state's land-grant university. Under the California Master Plan for Higher Education, the University of California is a part of the state's three-system public postsecondary education plan, which also includes the California Community Colleges and California State University systems.

The ten campuses have a combined enrollment of 299,407 students, with 26,100 faculty members and 192,400 staff members, and more than 2.5 million alumni. Nine campuses enroll undergraduate and graduate students, while UC San Francisco enrolls only graduate and professional students in the medical and health sciences. The University of California College of the Law, San Francisco is legally affiliated with the University of California and shares its name, but operates autonomously.

The University of California manages or co-manages three national laboratories for the United States Department of Energy: Lawrence Berkeley National Laboratory, Lawrence Livermore National Laboratory, and Los Alamos National Laboratory. The university is governed by a Board of Regents, whose autonomy from the rest of the state government is protected by the Constitution of California.

The University of California was founded on March 23, 1868, in Oakland after acquiring the assets of the College of California. It moved to Berkeley in 1873. The university also affiliated with independent medical and law schools in San Francisco. Over the following decades, it established branch locations and satellite programs elsewhere in the state, while Berkeley remained its only campus.

Beginning in March 1951, the University of California began reorganizing its administration to separate the Berkeley campus from the university-wide administration. UC president Robert Gordon Sproul remained the system's chief executive, while Clark Kerr became Berkeley's first chancellor and Raymond B. Allen became the first chancellor of an independently administered University of California, Los Angeles. However, the reorganization faced resistance from Sproul and his allies and was not completed during his presidency. After Kerr succeeded Sproul as UC president, the university was reorganized as a multicampus system between 1957 and 1960. Chancellors were appointed at additional campuses, and the campuses received greater administrative autonomy.

Eight of the campuses are considered Public Ivies, making California the state with the most universities in the nation to hold the title. UC campuses have large numbers of distinguished faculty in almost every academic discipline, with UC faculty and researchers having won 75 Nobel Prizes as of 2025.

== History ==
=== Early history ===
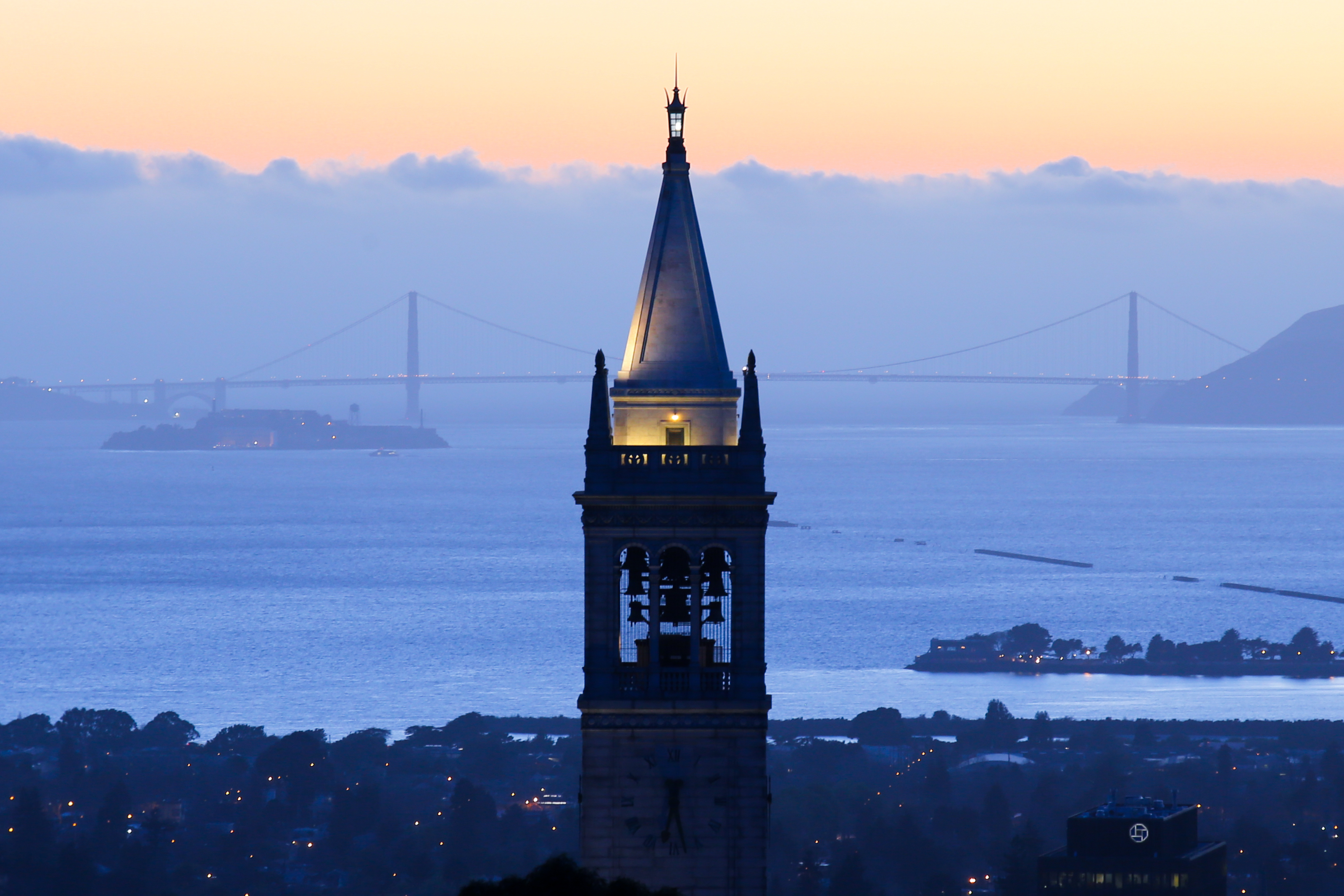
In November 1857, the College of California's trustees began to acquire various parcels of land facing the Golden Gate in what is now Berkeley.

In 1849, the state of California ratified its first constitution, which contained the express objective of creating a complete educational system including a state university. Taking advantage of the Morrill Land-Grant Acts, the California State Legislature established an Agricultural, Mining, and Mechanical Arts College in 1866. However, it existed only on paper, as a placeholder to secure federal land-grant funds.

Meanwhile, Congregational minister Henry Durant, an alumnus of Yale, had established the private Contra Costa Academy, on June 20, 1853, in Oakland, California. The initial site was bounded by Twelfth and Fourteenth Streets and Harrison and Franklin Streets in downtown Oakland (and is marked today by State Historical Plaque No. 45 at the northeast corner of Thirteenth and Franklin). In turn, the academy's trustees were granted a charter in 1855 for a College of California, though the college continued to operate as a college preparatory school until it added higher-level courses in 1860. The college's trustees, educators, and supporters believed in the importance of a liberal arts education (especially the study of the Greek and Roman classics), but ran into a lack of interest in liberal arts colleges on the American frontier (for post-secondary degrees, the college was graduating only three or four students per year).

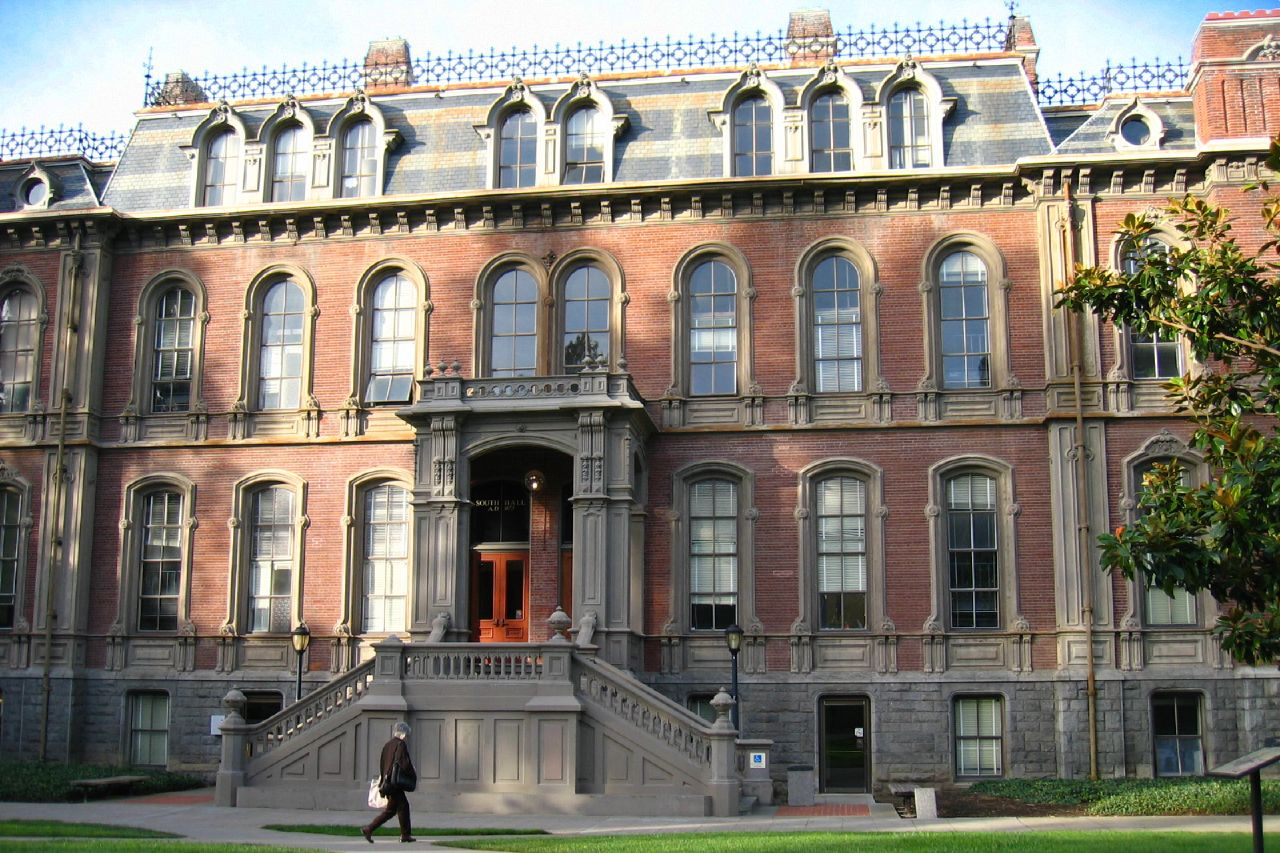
South Hall, built in 1873, is the oldest building on the Berkeley campus.

In November 1857, the college's trustees began to acquire various parcels of land facing the Golden Gate in what is now Berkeley for a future planned campus to the north of Oakland. But first, they needed to secure the college's water rights by buying a large farm to the east. In 1864, they organized the College Homestead Association, which borrowed $35,000 to purchase the land, plus another $33,000 to purchase 160 acres (650,000 m^{2}) of land to the south of the future campus. The association subdivided the latter parcel and started selling lots with the hope it could raise enough money to repay its lenders and also create a new college town. But sales of new homesteads fell short.

Governor Frederick Low favored the establishment of a state university based upon the University of Michigan plan, and thus in one sense may be regarded as the founder of the University of California. At the College of California's 1867 commencement exercises, where Low was present, Yale University professor Benjamin Silliman Jr. criticized Californians for establishing a state polytechnic school, instead of a real university. That same day, Low reportedly first suggested a merger of the already-functional College of California (which had a liberal arts focus, land, buildings, faculty, and students, but not enough money) with the nonfunctional state college (which had a polytechnical focus, money and nothing else), and went on to participate in the ensuing negotiations.

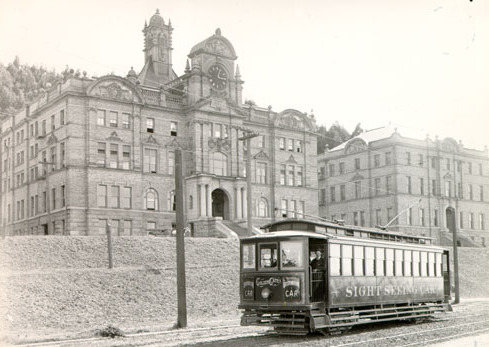
UC San Francisco campus in 1908.

On October 9, 1867, the college's trustees reluctantly agreed to join forces with the state college to their mutual advantage, but under one condition—that there not be simply an "Agricultural, Mining, and Mechanical Arts College", but a complete university, within which the assets of the College of California would be used to create a College of Letters (now known as the College of Letters and Science). Accordingly, the Organic Act, establishing the University of California, was introduced as a bill by Assemblyman John W. Dwinelle on March 5, 1868, and after it was duly passed by both houses of the state legislature, it was signed into state law by Governor Henry H. Haight (Low's successor) on March 23, 1868.

However, as legally constituted, the new university was not an actual merger of the two colleges, but was an entirely new institution which merely inherited certain objectives and assets from each of them. Governor Haight saw no need to honor any tacit understandings reached with his predecessor about institutional continuity. Only two college trustees became regents and a single faculty member (Martin Kellogg) was hired by the new university. By April 1869, the trustees had second thoughts about their agreement to donate the college's assets and disincorporate. To get them to proceed, regent John B. Felton helped them bring a "friendly suit" against the university to test the agreement's legality—which they promptly lost.

The University of California's second president, Daniel Coit Gilman, opened its new campus in Berkeley in September 1873.

=== UC affiliates ===
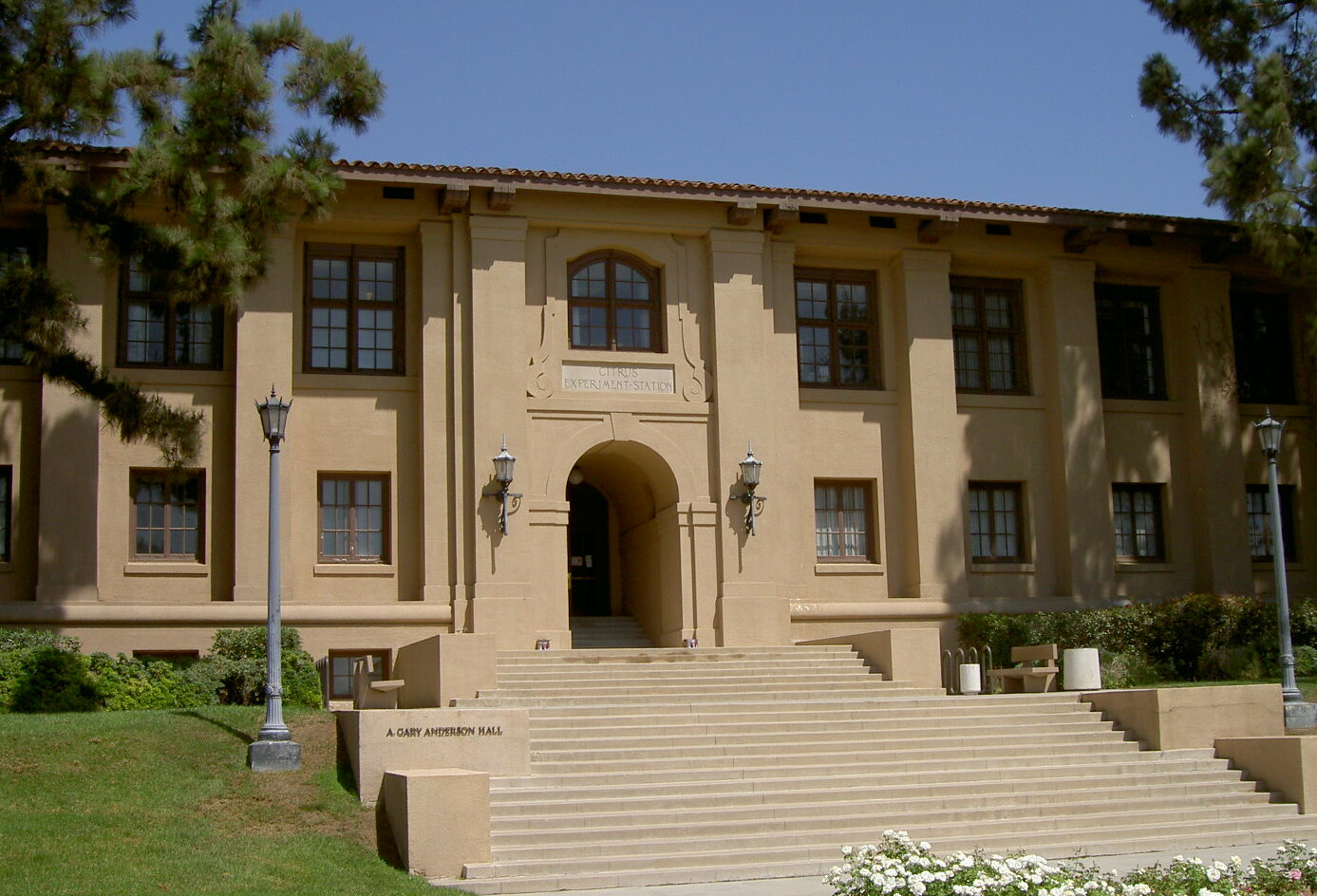
The Citrus Experiment Station, built in 1917, is the oldest building on the UC Riverside campus.

Section 8 of the Organic Act authorized the Board of Regents to affiliate the University of California with independent self-sustaining professional colleges. "Affiliation" meant UC and its affiliates would "share the risk in launching new endeavors in education". The affiliates shared the prestige of the state university's brand, and UC agreed to award degrees in its own name to their graduates on the recommendation of their respective faculties, but the affiliates were otherwise managed independently by their own boards of trustees, charged their own tuition and fees, and maintained their own budgets separate from the UC budget. It was through the process of affiliation that UC was able to claim it had medical and law schools in San Francisco within a decade of its founding.

In 1879, California adopted its second and current constitution, which included unusually strong language to ensure UC's independence from the rest of the state government. This had lasting consequences for the Hastings College of the Law, which had been separately chartered and affiliated in 1878 by an act of the state legislature at the behest of founder Serranus Clinton Hastings. After a falling out with his own handpicked board of directors, the founder persuaded the state legislature in 1883 and 1885 to pass new laws to place his law school under the direct control of the Board of Regents. In 1886, the Supreme Court of California declared those newer acts to be unconstitutional because the clause protecting UC's independence in the 1879 state constitution had stripped the state legislature of the ability to amend the 1878 act. To this day, the College of the Law (which dropped Hastings from its name in 2023) remains a UC affiliate, maintains its own board of directors, and is not governed by the regents.

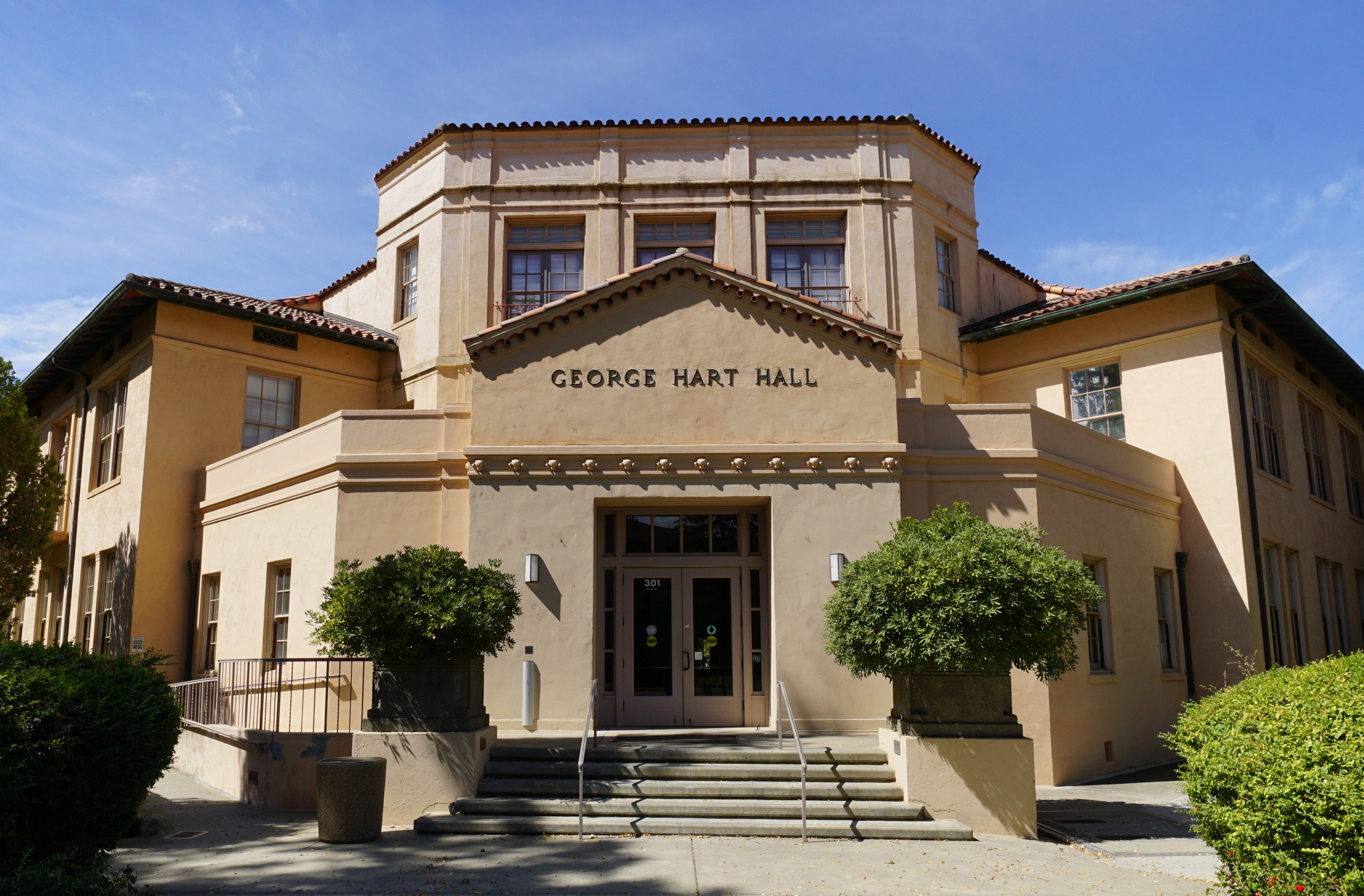
Hart Hall at UC Davis, built in 1928, is listed in the National Register of Historic Places.

In contrast, Toland Medical College (founded in 1864 and affiliated in 1873) and later, the dental, pharmacy, and nursing schools in San Francisco were affiliated with UC through written agreements, and not statutes invested with constitutional importance by court decisions. In the early 20th century, the Affiliated Colleges (as they came to be called) began to agree to submit to the regents' governance during the term of President Benjamin Ide Wheeler, as the Board of Regents had come to recognize the problems inherent in the existence of independent entities that shared the UC brand but over which UC had no real control. While Hastings remained independent, the Affiliated Colleges were able to increasingly coordinate their operations with one another under the supervision of the UC president and regents, and evolved into the health sciences campus known today as the University of California, San Francisco.

=== Becoming a research university ===
Section 1 of the Organic Act authorized the university to "provide instruction and complete education" in many different fields and professions, but the text of the Organic Act is notably silent about research. It was not until the 1930s, during the administration of President Sproul, that UC's mission drifted away from its traditional focus on instruction—which became the province of the California State University—and towards research. Sproul started to speak of UC's missions as "teaching, research, and public service", which remains true today. Thus, UC evolved into a research university whose faculty and staff would perform research to contribute directly to society, as opposed to indirect contributions by instructing students to equip them with the skills needed to later perform research in their own careers. The Master Plan for Higher Education, as enacted into state law in 1960, provides that UC "shall be the primary state-supported academic agency for research".

=== North-south tensions ===
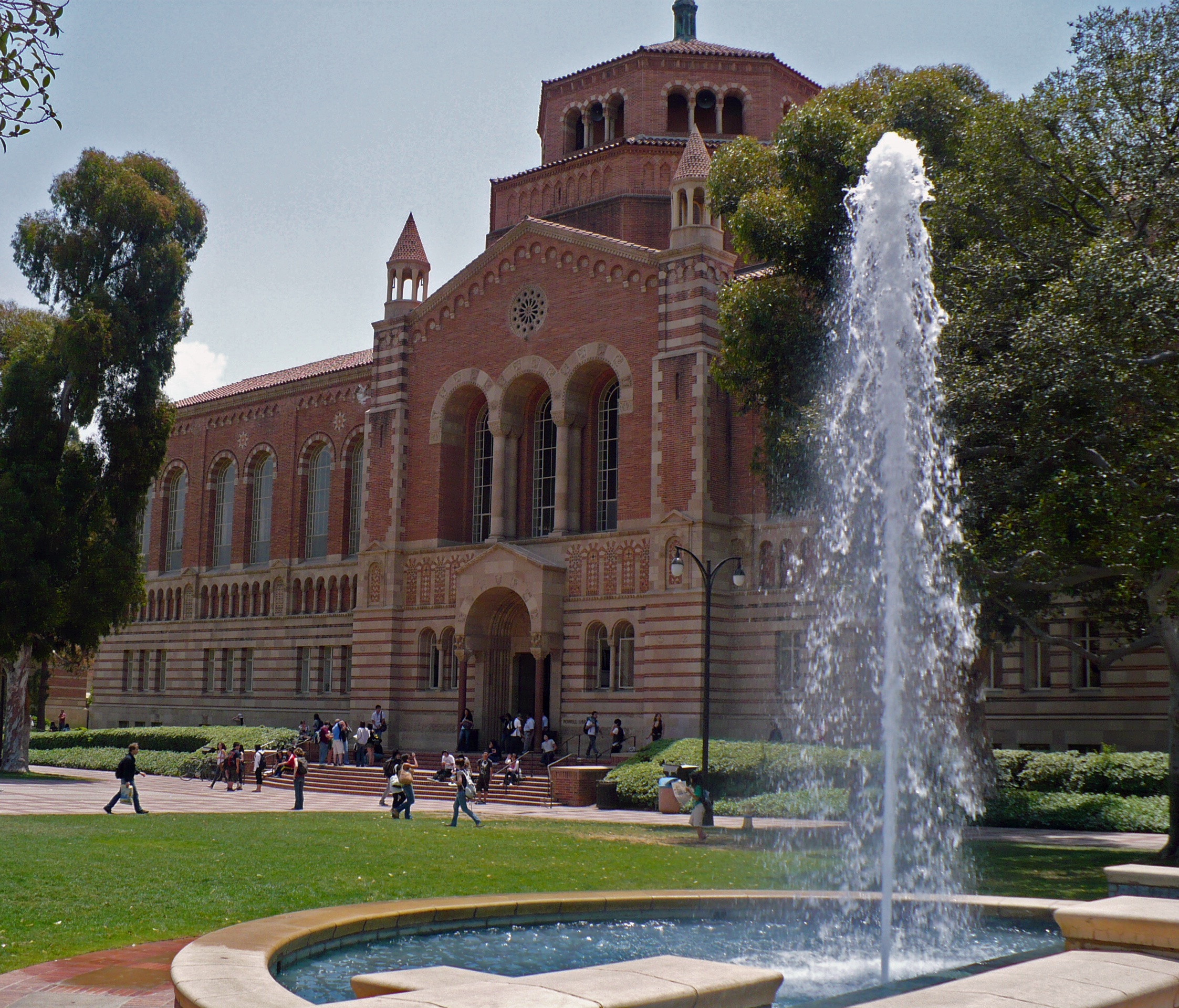
Powell Library, built in 1929, is one of the four oldest buildings on the UCLA campus.

In August 1882, the California State Normal School (whose original normal school in San Jose is now San Jose State University) opened a second school in Los Angeles to train teachers for the growing population of Southern California. In 1887, the Los Angeles school was granted its own board of trustees independent of the San Jose school. The state constitution prohibited the legislature from directly commanding the Board of Regents to create a southern campus, but it did not prohibit the state legislature from passing legislation to create additional state universities, and the supporters of the Los Angeles State Normal School used the possibility of that scenario to pressure the Board of Regents to voluntarily accept the normal school as UC's southern campus. In 1919, the state legislature transferred the normal school to UC control and renamed it the Southern Branch of the University of California. In 1927, it became the University of California at Los Angeles; the "at" would be replaced with a comma in 1958.

Los Angeles surpassed San Francisco in the 1920 census to become the most populous metropolis in California. Because Los Angeles had become the state government's single largest source of both tax revenue and votes, its residents felt entitled to demand more prestige and autonomy for their campus. Their efforts bore fruit in March 1951, when UCLA became the first UC site outside of Berkeley to achieve de jure coequal status with the Berkeley campus. That month, the regents approved a reorganization plan under which both the Berkeley and Los Angeles campuses would be supervised by chancellors reporting to the UC president. However, the 1951 plan was severely flawed; it was overly vague about how the chancellors were to become the "executive heads" of their campuses. Due to stubborn resistance from President Sproul and several vice presidents and deans—who simply carried on as before—the chancellors ended up as glorified provosts with limited control over academic affairs and long-range planning while the president and the regents retained de facto control over everything else.

=== Transformation and decentralization ===
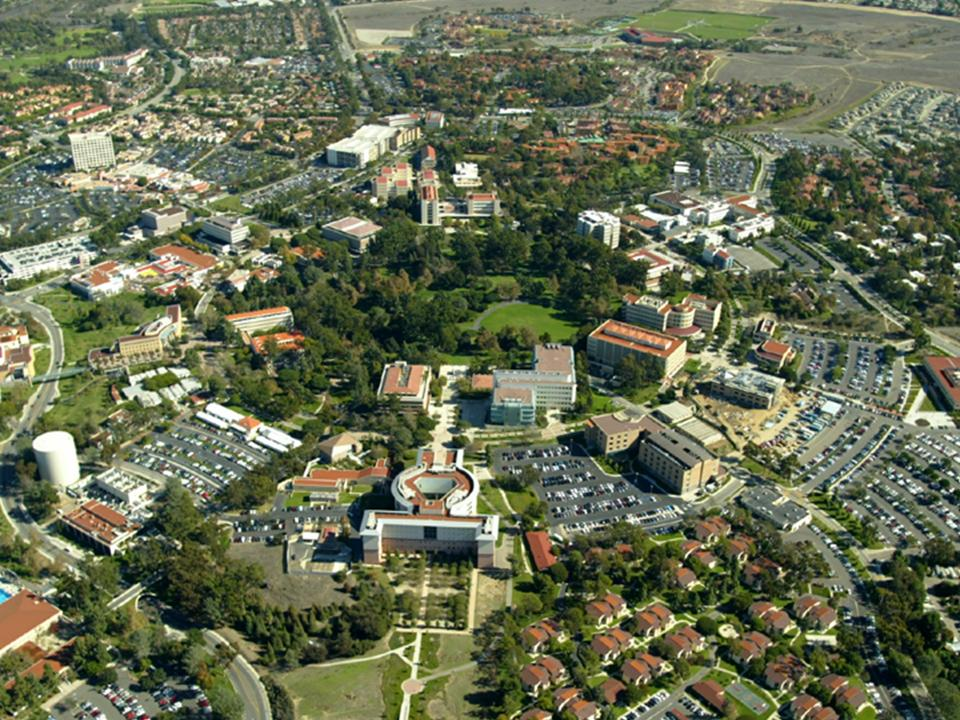
UC Irvine was founded and had its campus built out in the 1960s.

Upon becoming president in October 1957, Clark Kerr supervised UC's rapid transformation into a true public university system through a series of proposals adopted unanimously by the regents from 1957 to 1960. Kerr's reforms included expressly granting all campus chancellors the full range of executive powers, privileges, and responsibilities which Sproul had denied to Kerr himself, as well as the radical decentralization of a tightly knit bureaucracy in which all lines of authority had always run directly to the president at Berkeley or to the regents themselves. In 1965, UCLA Chancellor Franklin D. Murphy tried to push this to what he saw as its logical conclusion: he advocated for authorizing all chancellors to report directly to the Board of Regents, thereby rendering the UC president redundant. Murphy wanted to transform UC from one federated university into a confederation of independent universities, similar to the situation in Kansas (from where he was recruited). Murphy was unable to develop any support for his proposal, Kerr quickly put down what he thought of as "Murphy's rebellion", and therefore Kerr's vision of UC as a university system prevailed: "one university with pluralistic decision-making".

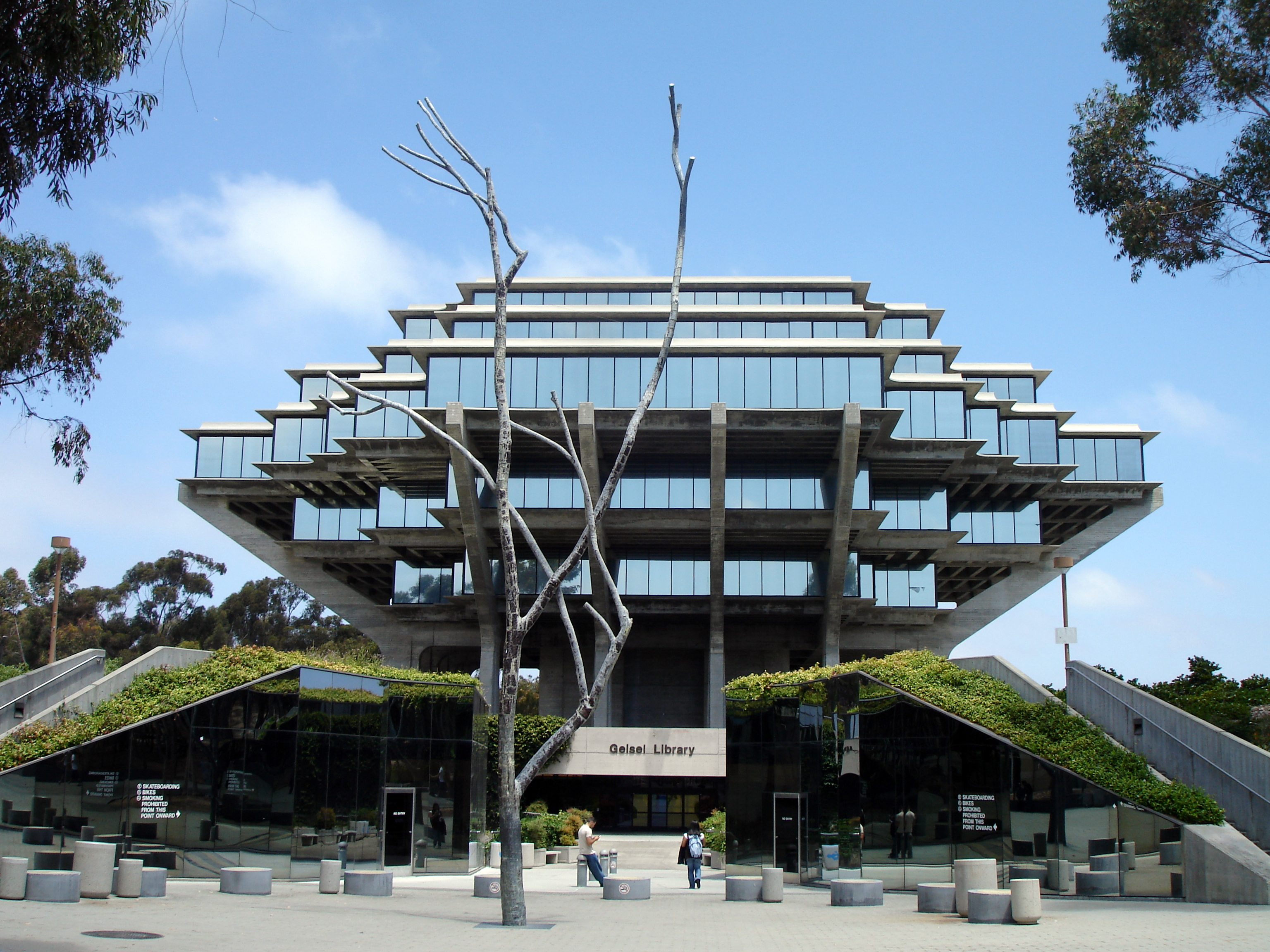
Geisel Library, at UC San Diego, was built in 1970.

During the 20th century, UC acquired additional satellite locations which, like Los Angeles, were all subordinate to administrators at the Berkeley campus. California farmers lobbied for UC to perform applied research responsive to their immediate needs; in 1905, the Legislature established a "University Farm School" at Davis and in 1907 a "Citrus Experiment Station" at Riverside as adjuncts to the College of Agriculture at Berkeley. In 1912, UC acquired a private oceanography laboratory in San Diego, which had been founded nine years earlier by local business promoters working with a Berkeley professor. In 1944, UC acquired Santa Barbara State College from the California State Colleges, the descendants of the State Normal Schools. In 1958, the regents began promoting these locations to general campuses, thereby creating UCSB (1958), UC Davis (1959), UC Riverside (1959), UC San Diego (1960), and UCSF (1964). Each campus was also granted the right to have its own chancellor upon promotion. In response to California's continued population growth, UC opened two additional general campuses in 1965, with UC Irvine opening in Irvine and UC Santa Cruz opening in Santa Cruz. The youngest campus, UC Merced opened in fall 2005 to serve the San Joaquin Valley.

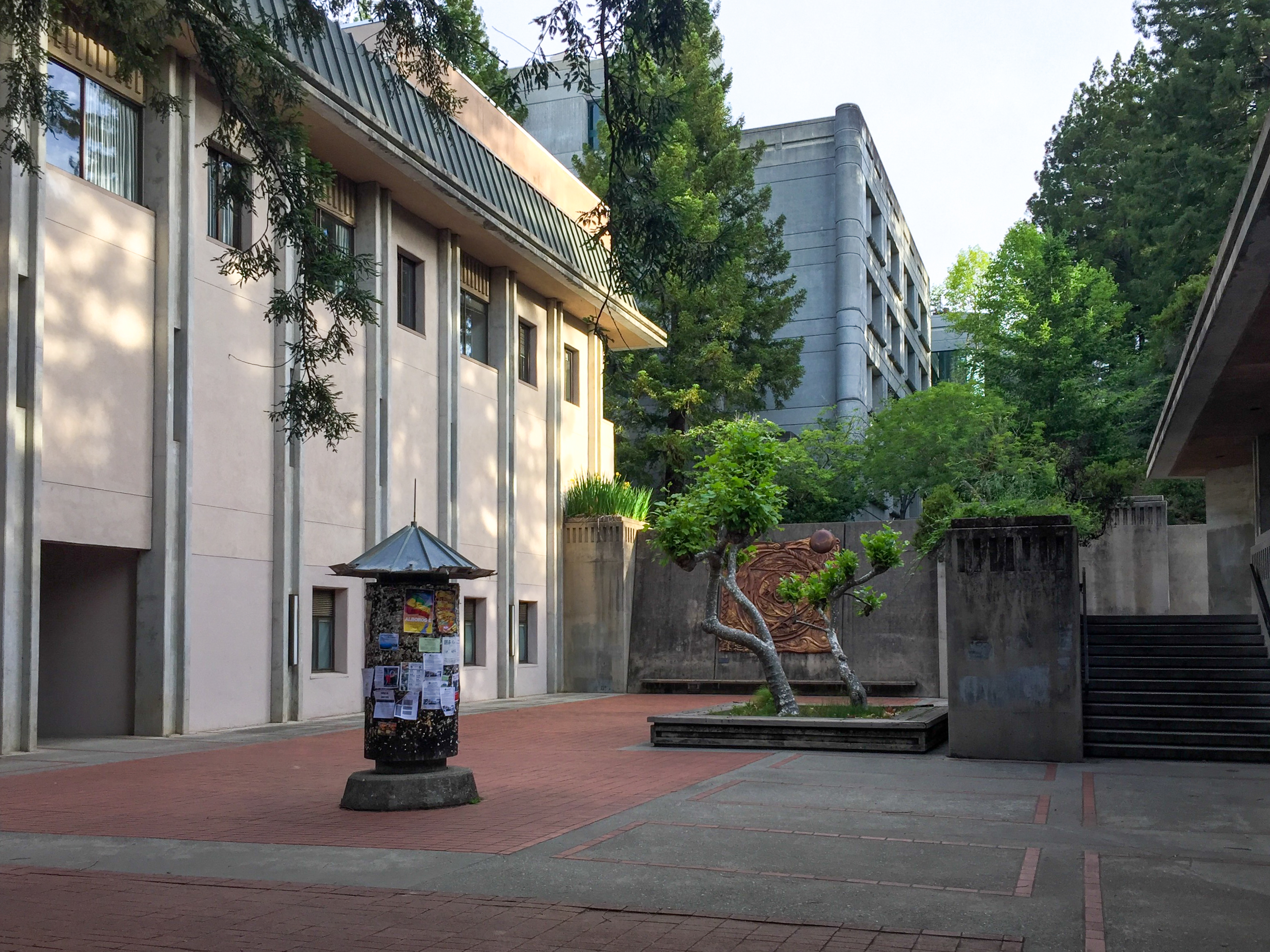
UC Santa Cruz, founded in 1965.

After losing campuses in Los Angeles and Santa Barbara to the University of California system, supporters of the California State College system arranged for the state constitution to be amended in 1946 to prevent similar losses from happening again in the future.

With decentralization complete, it was decided in 1986 that the UC president should no longer be based at the Berkeley campus, and the UC Office of the President moved to Kaiser Center in Oakland in 1989. That lakefront location was subject to widespread criticism as "too elegant and too corporate for a public university". In 1998, the Office of the President moved again, to a newly constructed but more modest building near the former site of the College of California in Oakland.

=== Modern history ===
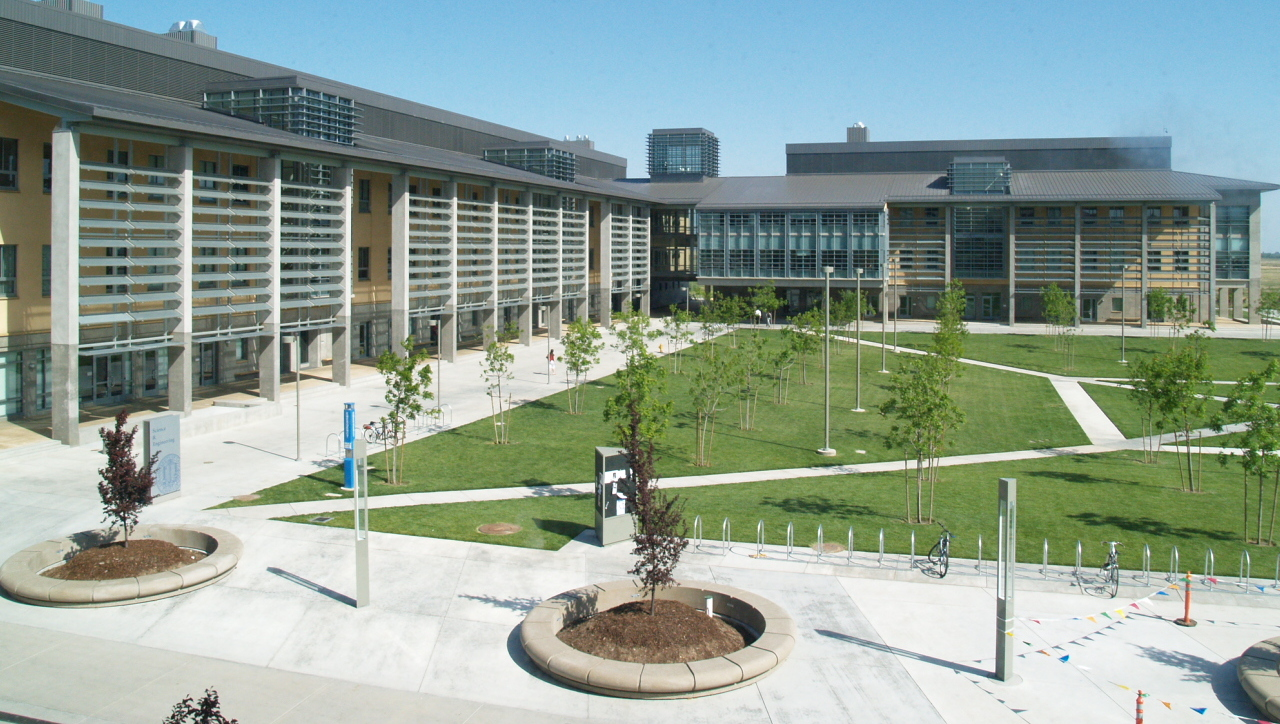
UC Merced, founded in 2005.

The Master Plan for Higher Education of 1960 established that UC must admit undergraduates from the top 12.5% (one-eighth) of graduating high school seniors in California. Prior to the promulgation of the Master Plan, UC was to admit undergraduates from the top 15%. UC does not currently adhere to all tenets of the original Master Plan, such as the directives that no campus was to exceed total enrollment of 27,500 students (in order to ensure quality) and that public higher education should be tuition-free for California residents. Five campuses, Berkeley, Davis, Irvine, Los Angeles, and San Diego, each have current total enrollment at over 30,000, and of these five, all but Irvine have undergraduate enrollments over 30,000.

After the state electorate severely limited long-term property tax revenue by enacting Proposition 13 in 1978, UC was forced to make up for the resulting collapse in state financial support by imposing a variety of fees which were tuition in all but name. On November 18, 2010, the regents finally gave up on the longstanding legal fiction that UC does not charge tuition by renaming the Educational Fee to "Tuition". As part of its search for funds during the 2000s and 2010s, UC quietly began to admit higher percentages of highly accomplished (and more lucrative) students from other states and countries, but was forced to reverse course in 2015 in response to the inevitable public outcry and start admitting more California residents.

On November 14, 2022, about 48,000 academic workers at all ten UC campuses, as well as the Lawrence Berkeley National Laboratory, went on strike for higher pay and benefits as authorized by the United Auto Workers (UAW) union. UAW alleged more than 20 unfair labor practice charges against UC, including unilateral changes in policy and obstructing worker negotiation. The strike lasted almost six weeks, officially ending on December 23.

== Governance ==
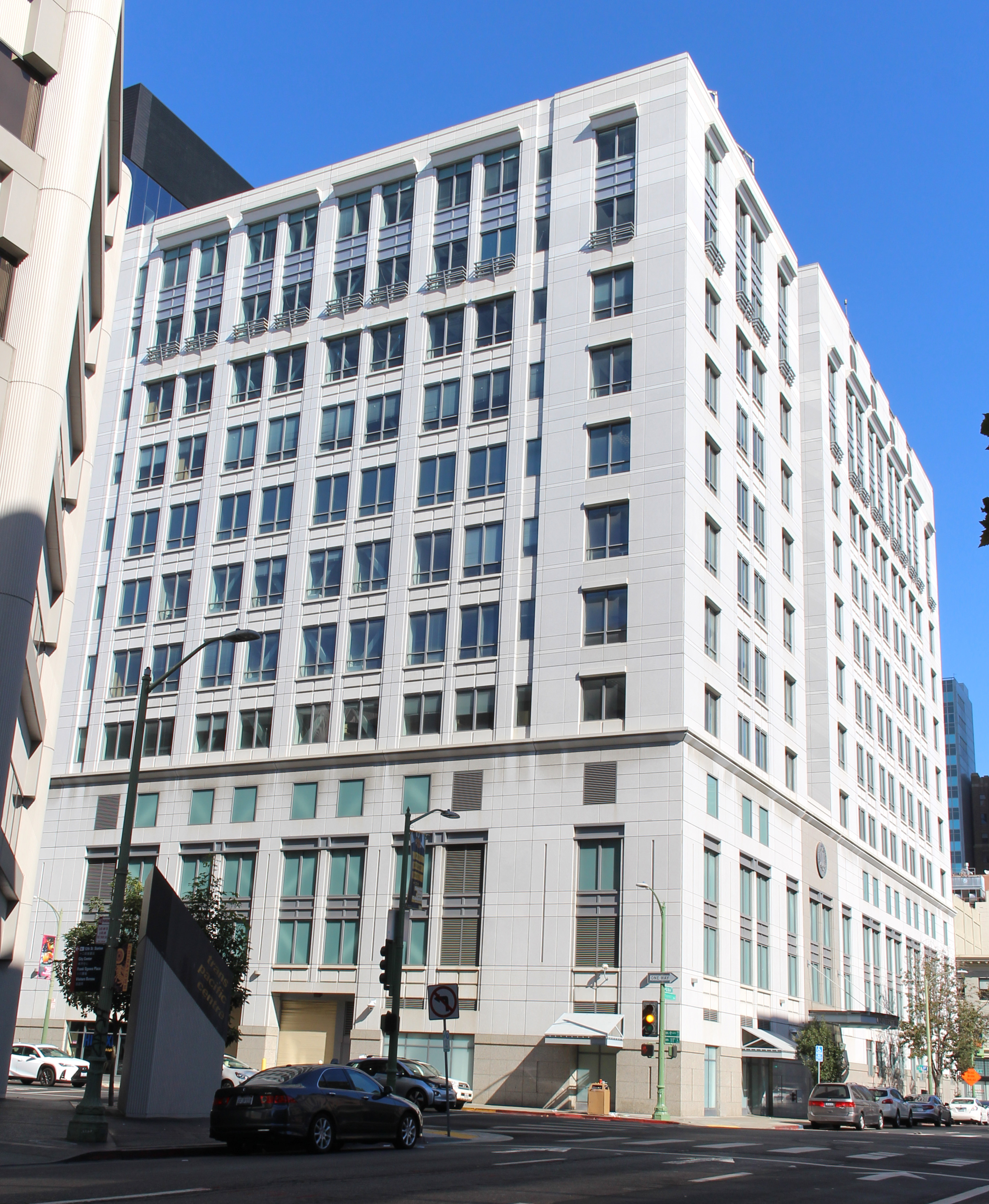
Office of the President of the University of California, in Oakland

All University of California campuses except the College of the Law in San Francisco are governed by the Regents of the University of California as required by the Constitution of the State of California. Eighteen regents are appointed by the governor for 12-year terms. One member is a student appointed for a one-year term. There are also seven ex officio members—the governor, lieutenant governor, speaker of the State Assembly, State Superintendent of Public Instruction, president and vice president of the UC alumni associations, and the UC president. The Academic Senate, made up of faculty members, is empowered by the regents to set academic policies. In addition, the system-wide faculty chair and vice-chair sit on the Board of Regents as non-voting members.

=== President of the University of California ===
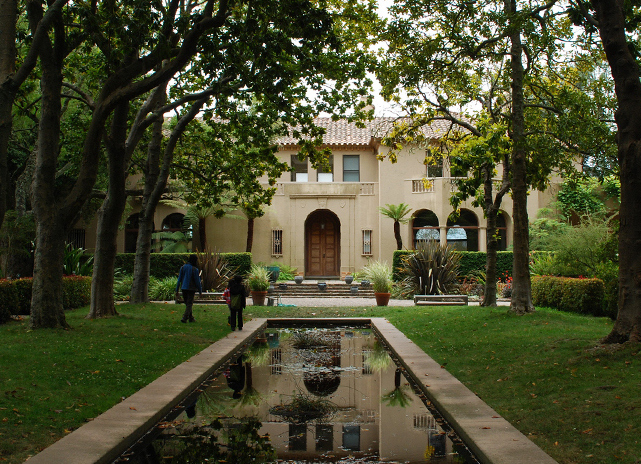
Blake House and Gardens, built by architect Walter Danforth Bliss in 1924, served as the official residence of the UC President, from 1967 until 2008, when it was opened to the public.

Originally, the president was the chief executive of the first campus, Berkeley. In turn, other UC locations (with the exception of the Hastings College of the Law) were treated as off-site departments of the Berkeley campus, and were headed by provosts who were subordinate to the president. In March 1951, the regents reorganized the university's governing structure. Starting with the 1952–53 academic year, day-to-day "chief executive officer" functions for the Berkeley and Los Angeles campuses were transferred to chancellors who were vested with a high degree of autonomy, and reported as equals to UC's president. As noted above, the regents promoted five additional UC locations to campuses and allowed them to have chancellors of their own in a series of decisions from 1958 to 1964, and the three campuses added since then have also been run by chancellors. In turn, all chancellors (again, with the exception of Hastings) report as equals to the University of California President. Today, the UC Office of the President (UCOP) and the Office of the Secretary and Chief of Staff to the Regents of the University of California share an office building in downtown Oakland that serves as the UC system's headquarters.

Kerr's vision for UC governance was "one university with pluralistic decision-making". In other words, the internal delegation of operational authority to chancellors at the campus level and allowing nine other campuses to become separate centers of academic life independent of Berkeley did not change the fact that all campuses remain part of one legal entity. As a 1968 UC centennial coffee table book explained: "Yet for all its campuses, colleges, schools, institutes, and research stations, it remains one University, under one Board of Regents and one president—the University of California." UC continues to take a "united approach" as one university in matters in which it inures to UC's advantage to do so, such as when negotiating with the legislature and governor in Sacramento. The University of California continues to manage certain matters at the systemwide level in order to maintain common standards across all campuses, such as student admissions, appointment and promotion of faculty, and approval of academic programs.

==== List of presidents ====
The following persons have led the University of California as president since 1869:

No.	Image	Name	Term start	Term end	Refs.
acting		John LeConte	June 15, 1869	August 16, 1870	
1		Henry Durant	August 17, 1870	November 6, 1872	
2		Daniel Coit Gilman	November 7, 1872	March 23, 1875	
3		John LeConte	March 24, 1875	August 22, 1881	
4		W.T. Reid	August 23, 1881	July 31, 1885	
5		Edward S. Holden	1885	March 22, 1888	
6		Horace Davis	March 23, 1888	September 15, 1890	
acting		Martin Kellogg	September 16, 1890	January 24, 1893	
7		Martin Kellogg	January 24, 1893	July 1899	
8		Benjamin Ide Wheeler	October 1, 1899	July 15, 1919	
University led by a committee of deans, July–December 1919
9		David Prescott Barrows	December 20, 1919	June 30, 1923	
10		William Wallace Campbell	July 1, 1923	June 30, 1930	
11		Robert Gordon Sproul (Note: Direct control of Berkeley and other campuses were transferred to respective campus chancellors, such as Clark Kerr for Berkeley campus, on July 1, 1952. Retired as president of UC system)	July 1, 1930	June 30, 1958	
12		Clark Kerr	July 1, 1958	January 20, 1967	
acting		Harry R. Wellman	January 20, 1967	December 31, 1967	
13		Charles J. Hitch	January 1, 1968	June 30, 1975	
14		David S. Saxon	July 1, 1975	June 30, 1983	
15		David P. Gardner	August 1, 1983	September 30, 1992	
16		Jack W. Peltason	October 1, 1992	September 30, 1995	
17		Richard C. Atkinson	October 1, 1995	October 1, 2003	
18		Robert C. Dynes	October 2, 2003	June 15, 2008	
19		Mark Yudof	June 16, 2008	September 29, 2013	
20		Janet Napolitano	September 30, 2013	July 31, 2020	
21		Michael V. Drake	August 1, 2020	July 31, 2025	
22		James Milliken	August 1, 2025	present	

Table notes:

All UC presidents had been white men until 2013, when former Homeland Security Secretary, and Governor of Arizona, Janet Napolitano became the first woman to hold the office of UC President. On July 7, 2020, Dr. Michael V. Drake, a former UC chancellor and medical research professor, was selected as the 21st president of the University of California system, making him the first black president to hold the office in UC's 152-year history. He took office on August 1, 2020.

==== Official residences ====
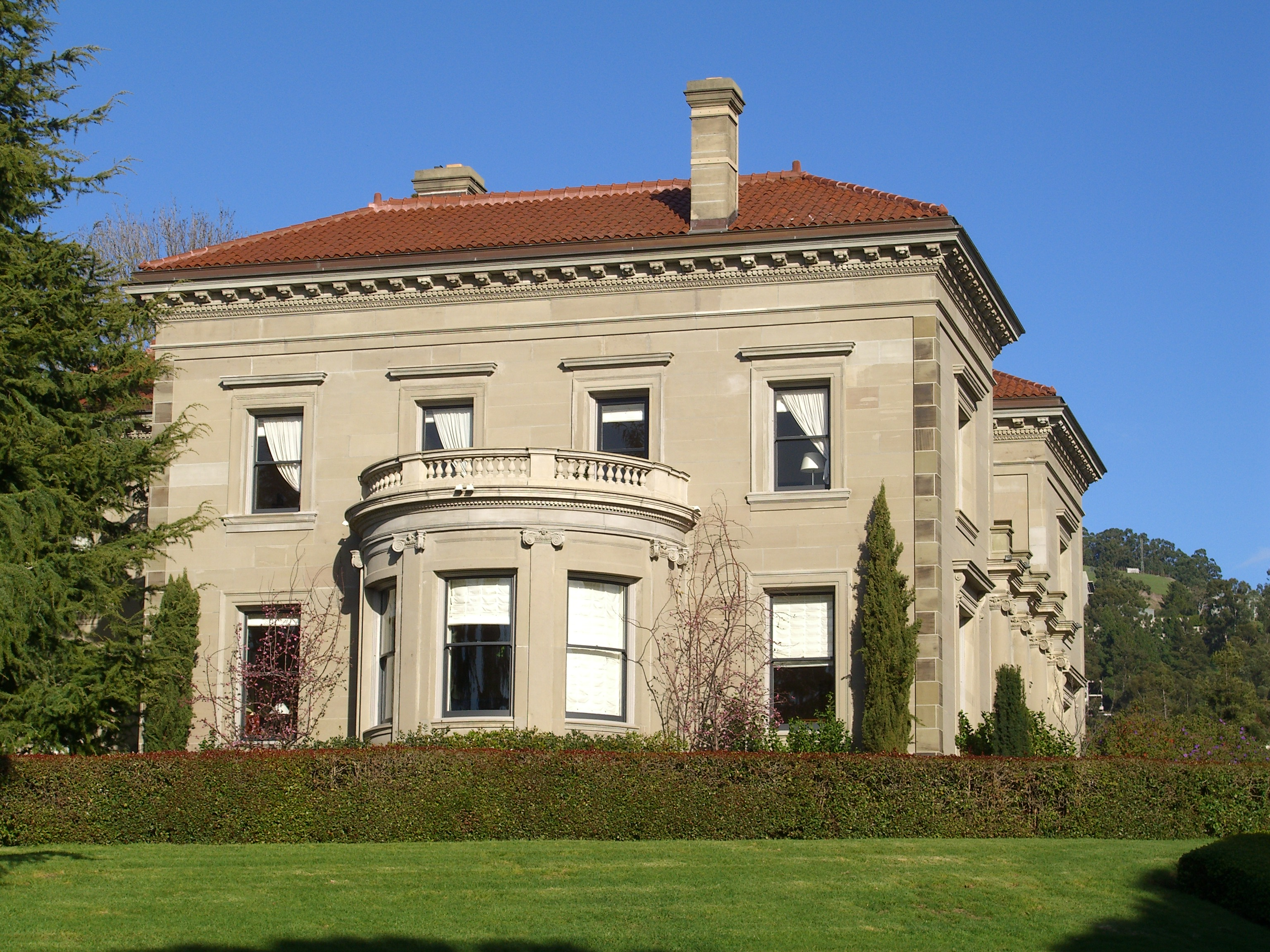
University House, Berkeley served as the official residence of the UC President from 1911 until 1958. Today it serves Berkeley's Chancellor.

Besides substantial six-figure incomes, the UC president and all UC chancellors enjoy controversial perks such as free housing in the form of university-maintained mansions. In 1962, Anson Blake's will donated his 10-acre (40,000 m^{2}) estate (Blake Garden) and mansion (Blake House) in Kensington to the University of California's Department of Landscape Architecture. In 1968, the regents decided to make Blake House the official residence of the UC president. As of 2005, it cost around $300,000 per year to maintain Blake Garden and Blake House; the latter, built in 1926, is a 13,239-square-foot (1,229.9 m^{2}) mansion with a view of San Francisco Bay.

Blake House has sat vacant since President Dynes departed in 2008, due to the high cost of needed seismic strengthening and renovating its dilapidated interior (estimated at $3.5 million in 2013). From 2008 to 2022, all three UC presidents during that timeframe (i.e., Yudof, Napolitano, and Drake) lived in rented homes. In 2022, UC finally purchased the Selden Williams House, a 6,400-square-foot (590 m^{2}) house in Berkeley, for $6.5 million to serve as the UC president's official residence. UC had previously owned the same home from 1971 to 1991, when it served as the official residence of the UC vice president. (UC no longer has a single "vice president"; the president's direct reports now have titles like "executive vice president", "senior vice president", or "vice president".)

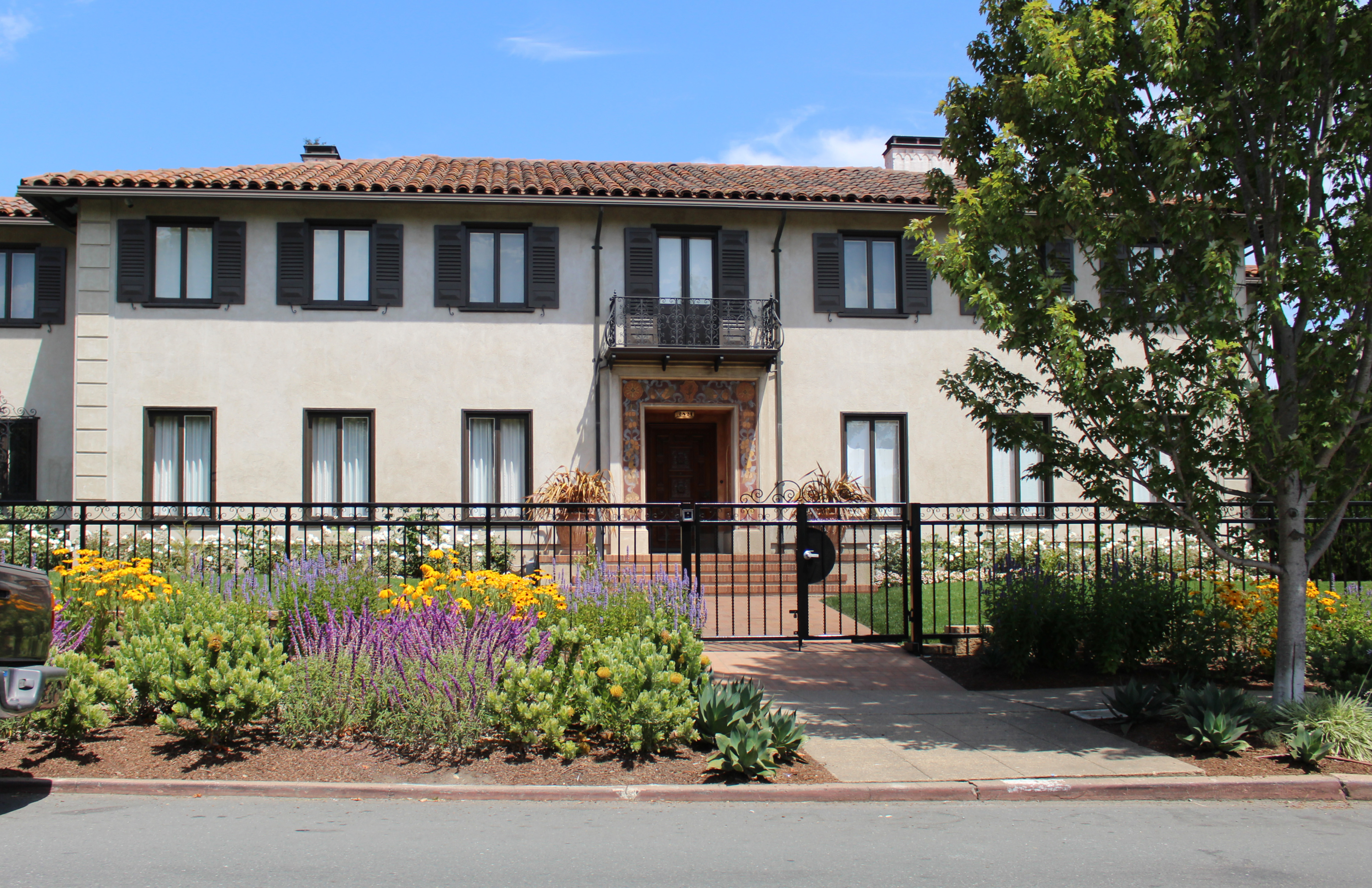
Selden Williams House, built in 1928 and designed by architect Julia Morgan, serves as the official residence of the UC President, since 2022.

All UC chancellors traditionally live for free in a mansion on or near campus that is usually known as University House, where they host social functions attended by guests and donors. Berkeley's University House formerly served as the official residence of the UC president, but is now the official residence of Berkeley's chancellor. UCSD's University House was closed from 2004 to 2014 for $10.5 million in renovations paid for by private donors, which were so expensive because the 12,000-square-foot structure sits on top of a sacred Native American cemetery and next to an unstable coastal bluff. Not all chancellors prefer to live on campus; at Santa Barbara, Chancellor Robert Huttenback found that campus's University House to be unsatisfactory, then was convicted in 1988 of embezzlement for his unauthorized use of university funds to improve his off-campus residence.

=== Finances ===
The State of California currently (2021–2022) spends $3.467 billion on the UC system, out of total UC operating revenues of $41.6 billion. The "UC Budget for Current Operations" lists the medical centers as the largest revenue source, contributing 39% of the budget, the federal government 11%, Core Funds (State General Funds, UC General Funds, student tuition) 21%, private support (gifts, grants, endowments) 7%, and Sales and Services at 21%. In 1980, the state funded 86.8% of the UC budget. While state funding has somewhat recovered, as of 2019 state support still lags behind even recent historic levels (e.g. 2001) when adjusted for inflation.

According to the California Public Policy Institute, California spends 12% of its General Fund on higher education, but that percentage is divided between the University of California, California State University and California Community Colleges. Over the past forty years, state funding of higher education has dropped from 18% to 12%, resulting in a drop in UC's per student funding from $23,000 in 2016 to a current $8,000 per year per student.

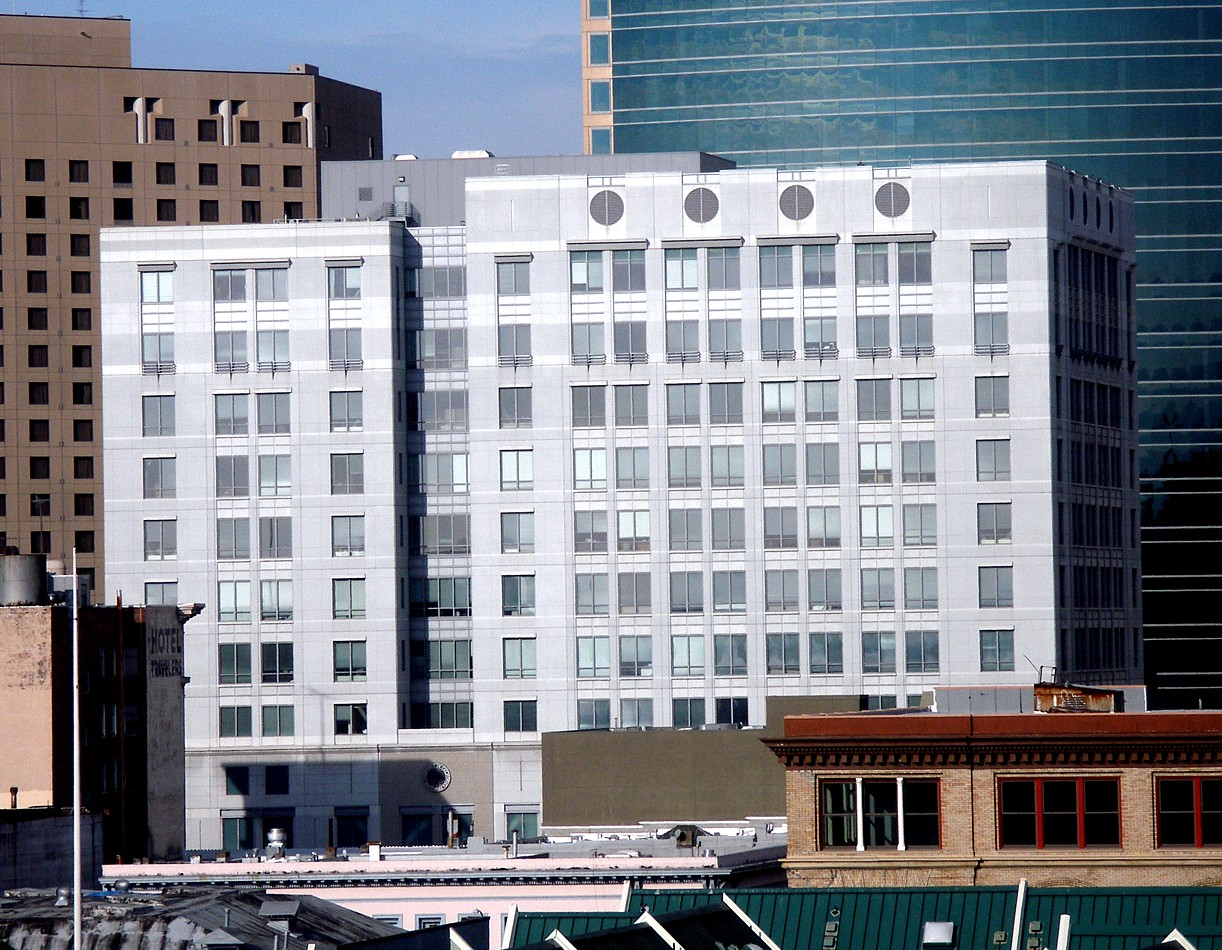
View of the UC Office of the President.

In May 2004, UC President Robert C. Dynes and CSU Chancellor Charles B. Reed struck a private deal, called the "Higher Education Compact", with Governor Schwarzenegger. They agreed to slash spending by about a billion dollars (about a third of the university's core budget for academic operations) in exchange for a funding formula lasting until 2011. The agreement calls for modest annual increases in state funds (but not enough to replace the loss in state funds Dynes and Schwarzenegger agreed to), private fundraising to help pay for basic programs, and large student fee hikes, especially for graduate and professional students. A detailed analysis of the Compact by the Academic Senate "Futures Report" indicated, despite the large fee increases, the university core budget did not recover to 2000 levels. Undergraduate student fees have risen 90% from 2003 to 2007. In 2011, for the first time in UC's history, student fees exceeded contributions from the State of California.

The First District Court of Appeal in San Francisco ruled in 2007 that the University of California owed nearly $40 million in refunds to about 40,000 students who were promised that their tuition fees would remain steady, but were hit with increases when the state ran short of money in 2003.

In September 2019, the University of California announced it will divest its $83 billion in endowment and pension funds from the fossil fuel industry, ostensibly to avoid the "financial risk" inherent in that industry because of climate change, but also in response to pleas to stop investing in fossil fuel.

=== Criticism ===
In 2008, the Western Association of Schools and Colleges, the regional accreditor of the UC schools, criticized the UC system for "significant problems in governance, leadership and decision making" and "confusion about the roles and responsibilities of the university president, the regents and the 10 campus chancellors with no clear lines of authority and boundaries".

In 2016, university system officials admitted that they monitored all e-mails sent to and from their servers.

== Campuses and rankings ==
The ten UC campuses

At present, the UC system officially describes itself as a system of "10 campuses" consisting of the campuses listed below. These campuses are under the direct control of the regents and president. Only ten campuses are listed on the official UC letterhead.

Although it shares the name and public status of the UC system, the College of the Law, San Francisco (formerly Hastings College of the Law) is not controlled by the regents or president; it has a separate board of directors and must seek funding directly from the Legislature. However, under the California Education Code, Hastings degrees are awarded in the name of the regents and bear the signature of the UC president. Furthermore, Education Code section 92201 states that Hastings "is affiliated with the University of California, and is the law department thereof".

=== University rankings ===
Annually, UC campuses are ranked highly by various publications. Six UC campuses rank in the top 50 U.S. National Universities of 2026 by U.S. News & World Report: Berkeley, UCLA, UC Santa Barbara, UC San Diego, UC Irvine, and UC Davis. Four UC campuses also ranked in the top 50 in the U.S. News & World Report Best Global Universities Rankings in 2026, namely Berkeley, UCLA, UCSF, and UC San Diego. UCSF is ranked as one of the top universities in biomedicine in the world and the UCSF School of Medicine is ranked 3rd in the United States among research-oriented medical schools and for primary care by U.S. News & World Report.

Three UC campuses: Berkeley, UCLA, and UC San Diego all ranked in the top 15 universities in the US according to the 2020 Academic Ranking of World Universities (ARWU) US National University Rankings and also in the top 20 in World University Rankings. The Academic Ranking of World Universities also ranked UCSF, UC Davis, UC Irvine, and UC Santa Barbara in the top 50 US National Universities and in the top 100 World Universities in 2020.

Berkeley, UCLA, and UC San Diego all ranked in the top 50 universities in the world according to both the Times Higher Education World University Rankings for 2021 and the Center for World University Rankings (CWUR) for 2020, while UC Irvine, UC Santa Barbara, and UC Davis ranked in the top 100 universities in the world. Forbes also ranked the six UC campuses mentioned above as being in the top 50 universities in America in 2021. Forbes also named the top three public universities in America as all being UC campuses, namely, Berkeley, UCLA, and UCSD, and ranked three more campuses, UC Davis, UC Santa Barbara, and UC Irvine as being among the top 20 public universities in America in 2021. The six aforementioned campuses are all considered Public Ivies. The QS World University Rankings for 2021 ranked three UC campuses: Berkeley, UCLA and UC San Diego as being in the top 100 universities in the world.

Individual academic departments also rank highly among the UC campuses. The 2021 U.S. News & World Report Best Graduate Schools report ranked Berkeley as being among the top 5 universities in the nation in the departments of Psychology, Economics, Political Science, Computer Science, Engineering, Biological Sciences, Chemistry, Mathematics, Earth Sciences, Physics, Sociology, History, and English, and ranked UCLA in the top 20 in the same departments. U.S. News & World Report also ranked the same departments at UC San Diego among the top 20 in the nation, with the exception of the departments of Sociology, History, and English. UC Davis, UC Irvine and UC Santa Barbara ranked in the top 50 in the departments of Psychology, Economics, Political Science, Computer Science, Engineering, Biological Sciences, Chemistry, Mathematics, Earth Sciences, Physics, Sociology, History, and English, with the exception of UC Santa Barbara's Psychology and Political Science departments, according to U.S. News & World Report. UC Santa Cruz and UC Riverside ranked in the top 100 in the nation in the same departments, along with UC Merced's Psychology and Political Science departments.

Campus	Founded	Enrollment (Fall 2024)	Endowment (Note: Assets managed by campus foundations including investment allocations to the General Endowment Pool (GEP) and Short Term Investment Pool (STIP).) (FY2024)	Athletics		Rankings							
Campus	Founded	Enrollment (Fall 2024)	Endowment (FY2024)	Affiliation	Nickname	USNWR National (2026)	USNWR Global (2025)	ARWU National (2024)	ARWU World (2024)	CWUR World (2025)	Forbes National (2026)	THE World (2025)	QS World (2026)
Berkeley	1868	45,882	$3.11 billion	NCAA Div I ACC	Golden Bears	15 (tie)	6	4	5	12	5	8	17 (tie)
Davis	1905	40,065	$770.4 million	NCAA Div I Big West	Aggies	32 (tie)	96 (tie)	39–50	101–150	60	44	62 (tie)	114 (tie)
Irvine	1965	37,297	$894.2 million	NCAA Div I Big West	Anteaters	32 (tie)	96 (tie)	34	76	89	31	90 (tie)	293
Los Angeles	1919	47,335	$4.30 billion	NCAA Div I Big Ten	Bruins	17 (tie)	13	12	15	17	15	18 (tie)	46
Merced	2005	9,110	$32.9 million	NCAA Div II; CCAA	Bobcats	57 (tie)	763 (tie)	115-142	501-600	835	190	401-500	—N/a
Riverside	1954	26,384	$274.6 million	NCAA Div I Big West	Highlanders	75 (tie)	242 (tie)	60-78	201-300	268	77	251-300	458 (tie)
San Diego	1960	44,256	$1.59 billion	NCAA Div I Big West (WCC in 2027)	Tritons	29	21 (tie)	14-15	18	33	20	34	66
San Francisco	1864	3,007 (Graduate only)	$3.09 billion	—N/a	—N/a	—N/a	16 (tie)	16	20	39	—N/a	—N/a	—N/a
Santa Barbara	1909	26,133	$428.4 million	NCAA Div I Big West (WCC in 2027)	Gauchos	40	91 (tie)	31	64	112	42	67 (tie)	179
Santa Cruz	1965	19,938	$165.4 million	NCAA Div III; C2C	Banana Slugs	88 (tie)	133 (tie)	51-59	151–200	335	63	196 (tie)	440 (tie)

== Academics ==
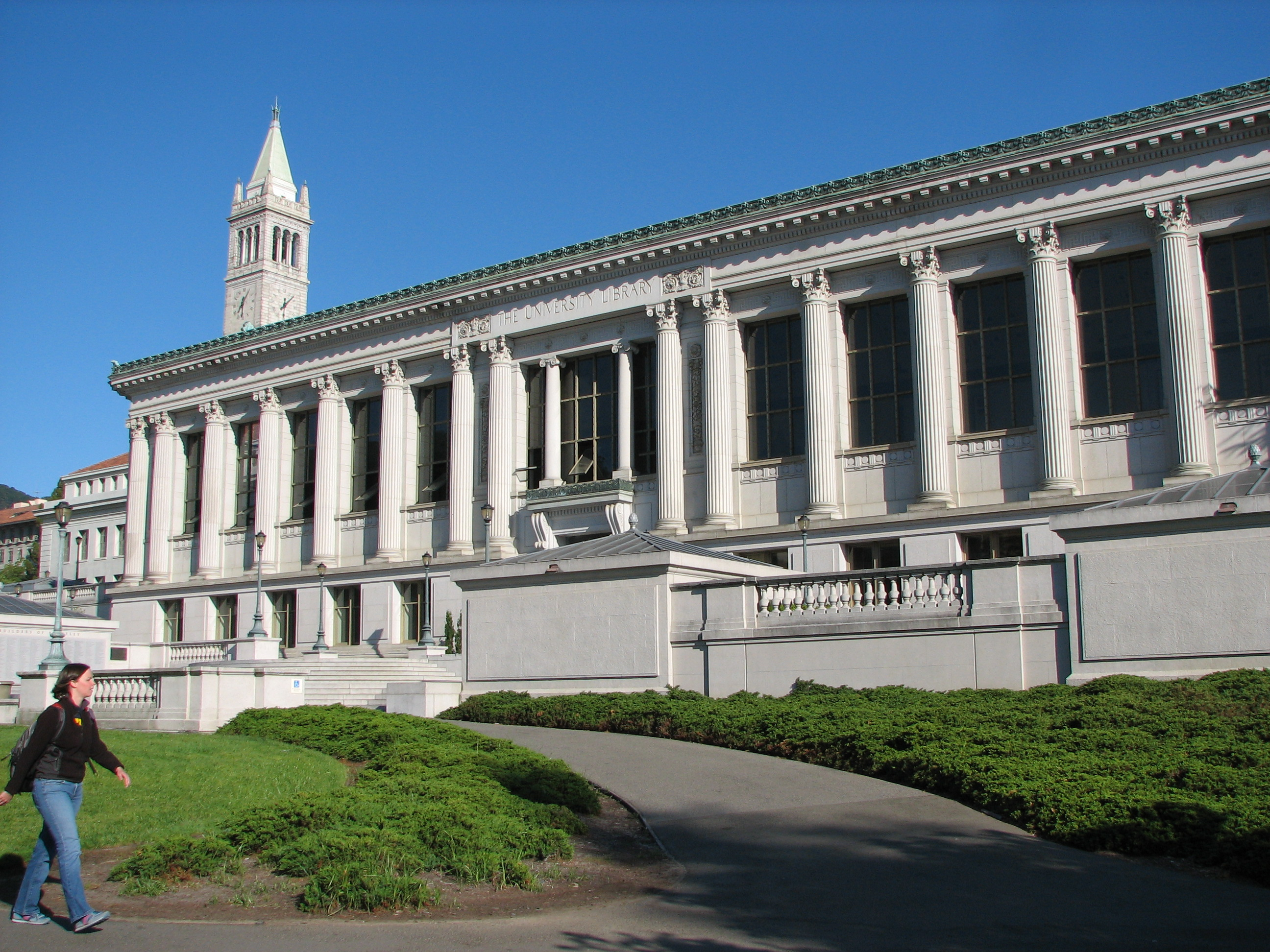
Doe Memorial Library, main facility of the UC Berkeley Libraries.

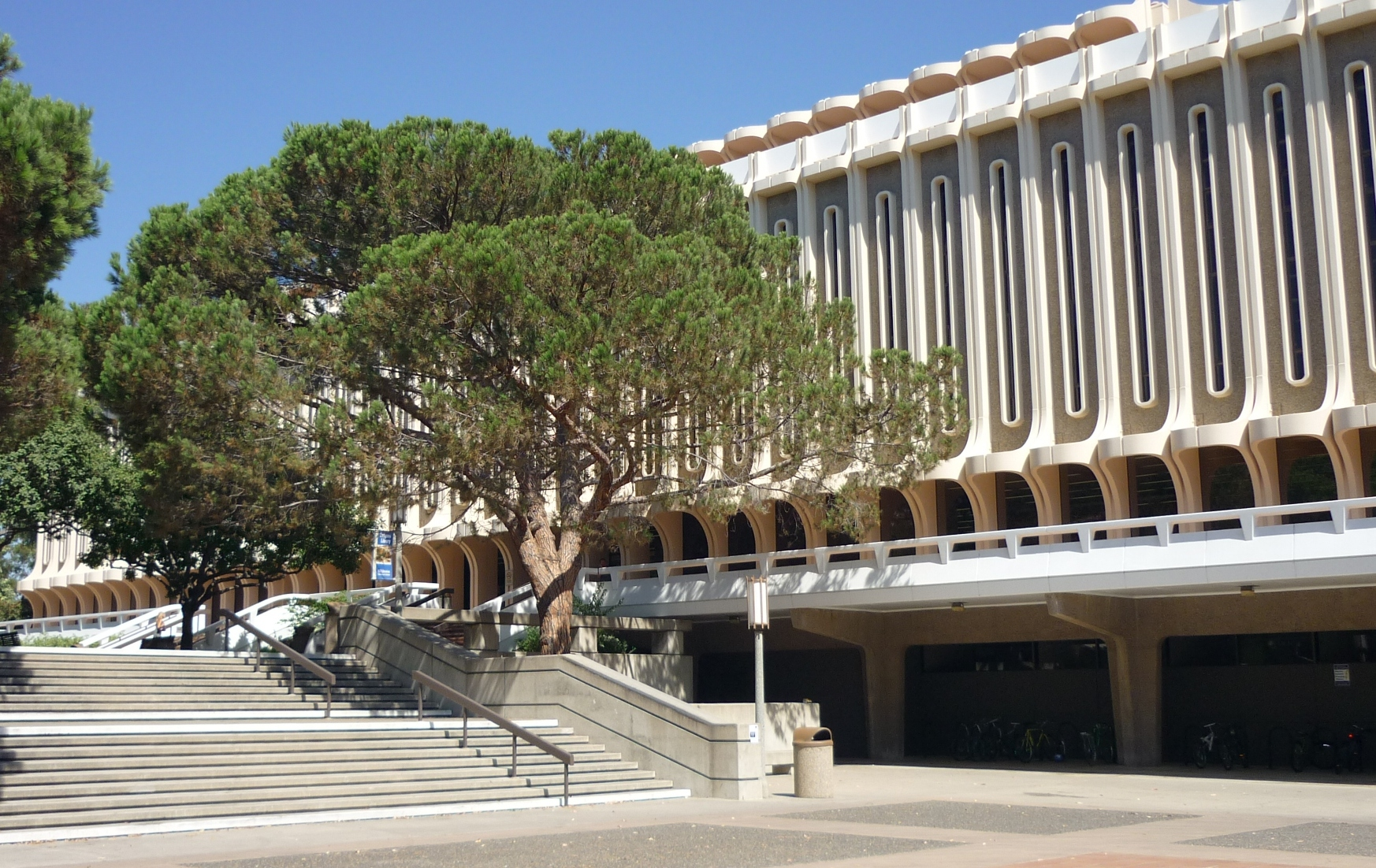
Langson Library at UC Irvine.

As of the end of fiscal year 2023, UC controls 13,810 active patents. UC researchers and faculty were responsible for 1,440 new inventions that same year. On average, UC researchers create four new inventions per day.

Eight of UC's ten campuses (Berkeley, UC Davis, UCI, UCLA, UC Riverside, UCSD, UC Santa Barbara, and UC Santa Cruz) are members of the Association of American Universities (AAU), an alliance of elite American research universities founded in 1900 at UC's suggestion. Collectively, the system counts among its faculty (as of 2002):

- 389 members of the Academy of Arts and Sciences
- 5 Fields Medal recipients
- 19 Fulbright Scholars
- 25 MacArthur Fellows
- 254 members of the National Academy of Sciences
- 91 members of the National Academy of Engineering
- 13 National Medal of Science laureates
- 61 Nobel laureates
- 106 members of the Institute of Medicine

=== Nobel Prize winners ===
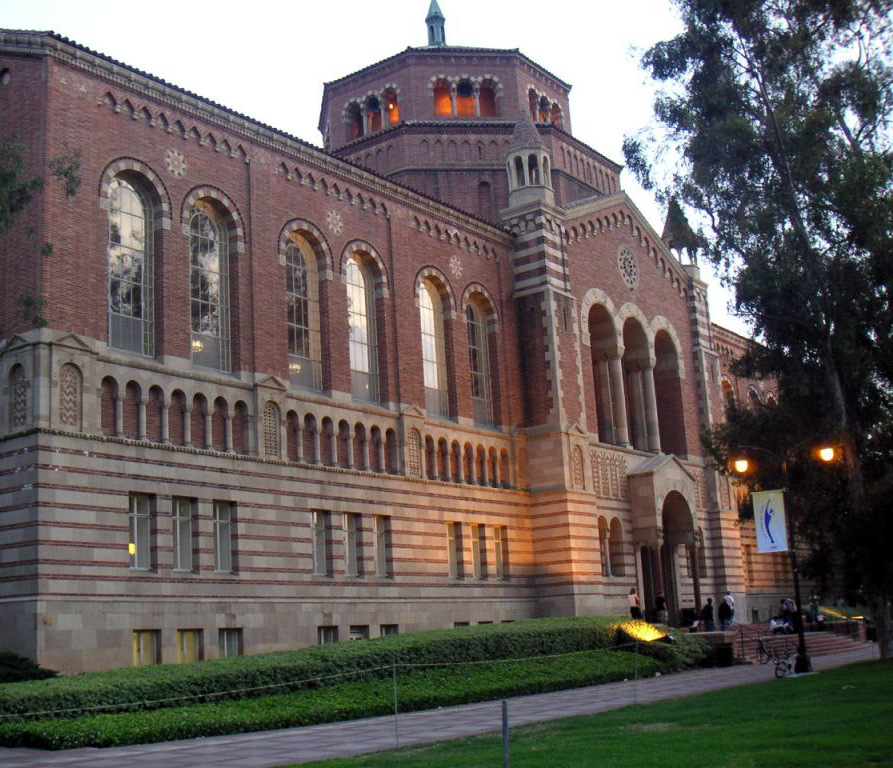
Powell Library, main facility of the UCLA Library.

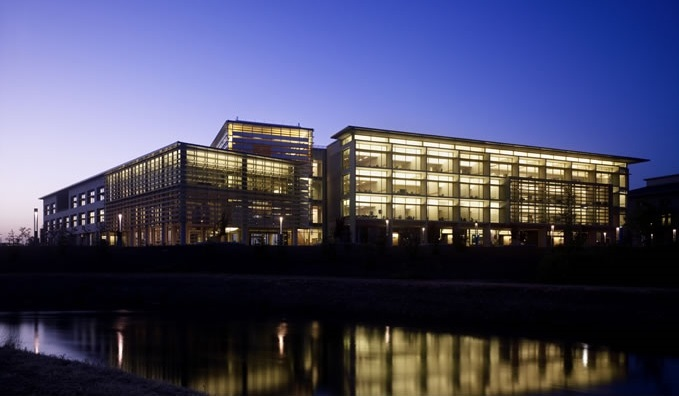
Kolligian Library at UC Merced.

Of the twelve Nobel laureates named in 2024, five have prior UC affiliations as alumni (Gary Ruvkun and David Baker), faculty (John Hopfield, Geoffrey Hinton, and James A. Robinson), and postdocs (Baker and Hinton).

As of October 2021, the following data are taken from List of Nobel laureates by university affiliation, which counts university alumni and staff, and are not the official count from the University of California.

Campus	No. of winners	Founded	No. of Winners/ 10 years of age
Berkeley	110	1868	7.2
San Diego	28	1960	4.6
Los Angeles	27	1919	2.6
Santa Barbara	14	1909	1.8
San Francisco	10	1864	0.7
Irvine	7	1965	1.3
Davis	4	1905	0.3
Riverside	3	1954	0.4
Santa Cruz	1	1965	0.2
Merced	0	2005	0

=== UC Libraries ===
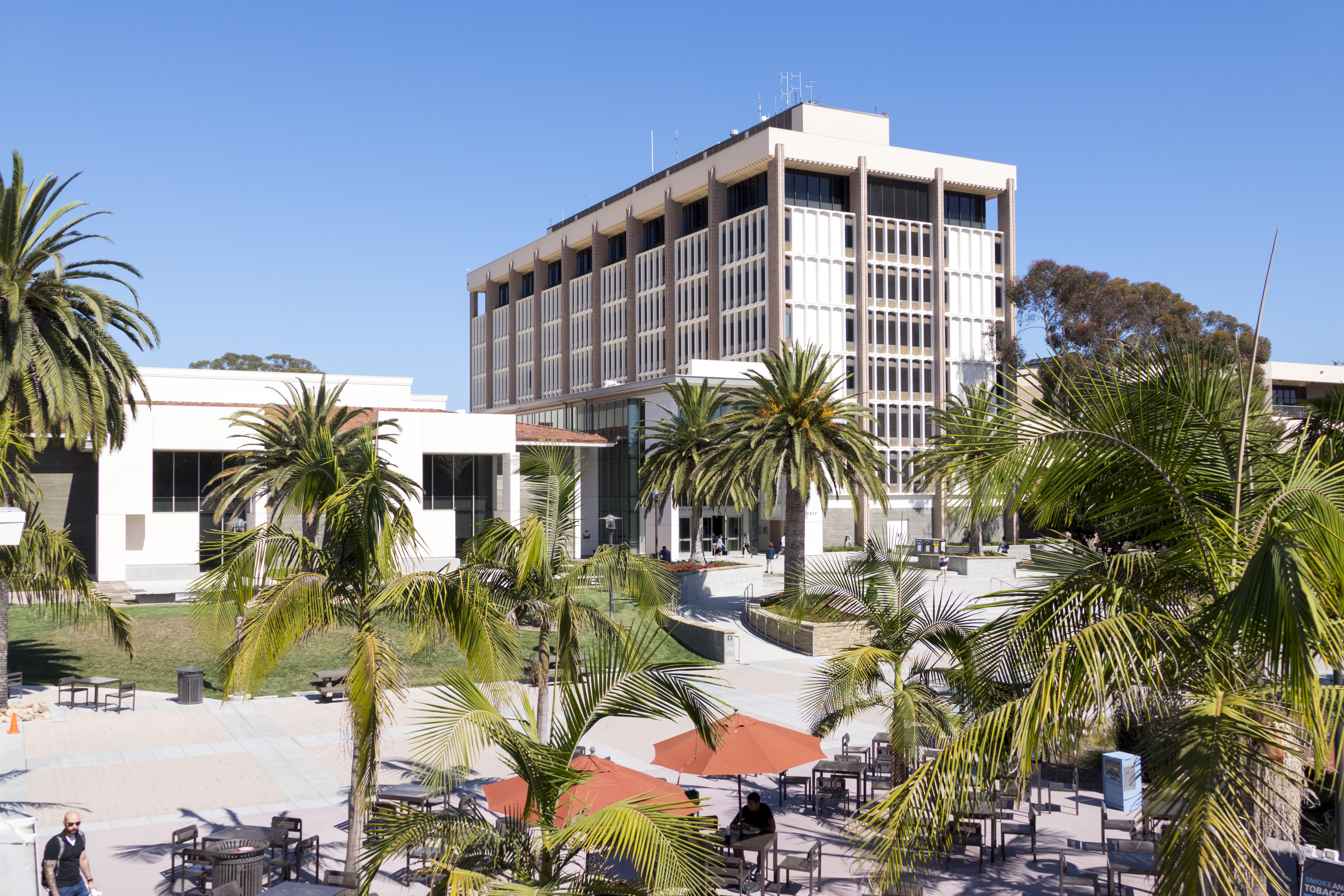
Davidson Library, the main facility of the UC Santa Barbara Library.

At 40.8 million print volumes, the University of California library system is home to one of the largest collections of printed materials in the world. On July 27, 2021, all ten campuses went live with a unified online library catalog, UC Library Search. Besides on-campus libraries, the UC system also maintains two regional library facilities (one each for Northern and Southern California), which each accept older items from all UC campus libraries in their respective region. As of 2019, Northern Regional Library Facility is home to 7.4 million items, while Southern Regional Library Facility is home to 6.5 million items.

=== Academic calendar ===
In 1966, UC switched its academic calendar from the semester system to the quarter system. This was "part of a national trend to join state campuses across the U.S. that were aligning with private universities, including Stanford, that had operated on quarters since World War I to accommodate students in military training programs".

Berkeley returned to the semester system in 1983, and Merced has operated on the semester system since its 2005 opening. However, all five law schools operate on the semester system, as does the David Geffen School of Medicine at UCLA.

In fall 2024, with the quarter system in decline nationwide (down to about 50 institutions and falling), UC initiated a systemwide study of switching all campuses back to the semester system.

=== Academic organization ===
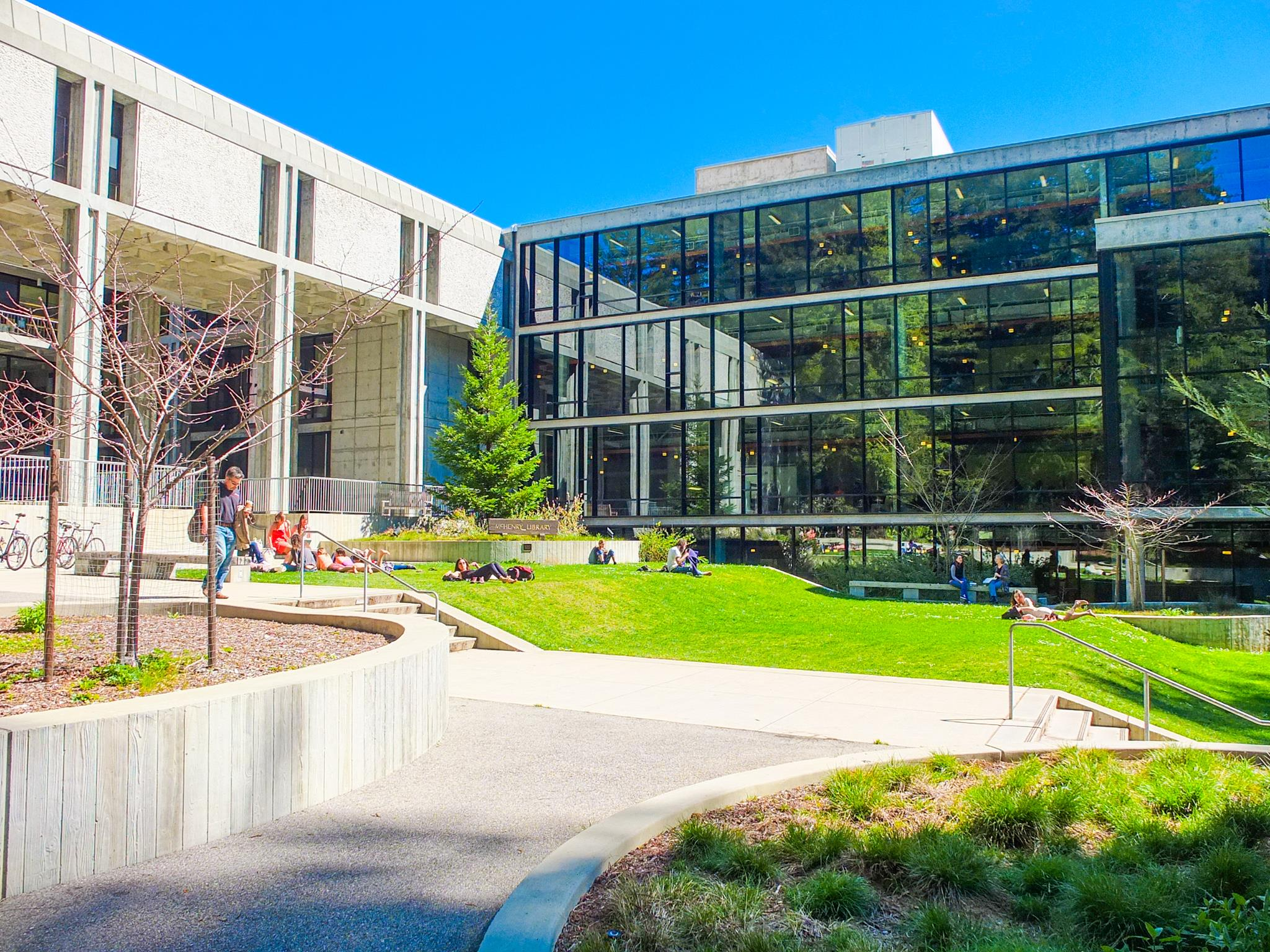
McHenry Library at UC Santa Cruz.

Davis, Los Angeles, Riverside, and Santa Barbara all followed Berkeley's example by aggregating the majority of arts, humanities, and science departments into a relatively large College of Letters and Science. Therefore, at Berkeley, Davis, Los Angeles, and Santa Barbara, their respective College of Letters and Science is by far the single largest academic unit on each campus. The College of Letters and Science at Los Angeles is the largest academic unit in the entire UC system. Riverside later separated the natural sciences and kept only social sciences grouped with arts and humanities, an example followed by Merced at its founding (although Merced organizes its departments into schools and not colleges).

Due to President Kerr's interest in not reproducing the impersonal undergraduate experience often seen in such gigantic academic units, San Diego and Santa Cruz both implemented residential college systems inspired by British models (in which each college has distinctive general education requirements reflecting its chosen theme) and grouped most academic departments into a small number of broadly defined divisions which are all independent of the colleges. In February 2022, San Diego turned its divisions into schools.

Irvine is organized into 13 schools and San Francisco is organized into four schools, all of which are relatively narrow in scope. Originally, Irvine was also going to have a College of Letters and Science, like Berkeley. But the original UCI plan, written by Ivan Hinderaker, granted the college's five divisions so much autonomy from one another that by 1967, the UCI Academic Senate voted to transform the divisions into "schools" whose deans would report directly to the vice chancellor for academic affairs.

== Admissions ==
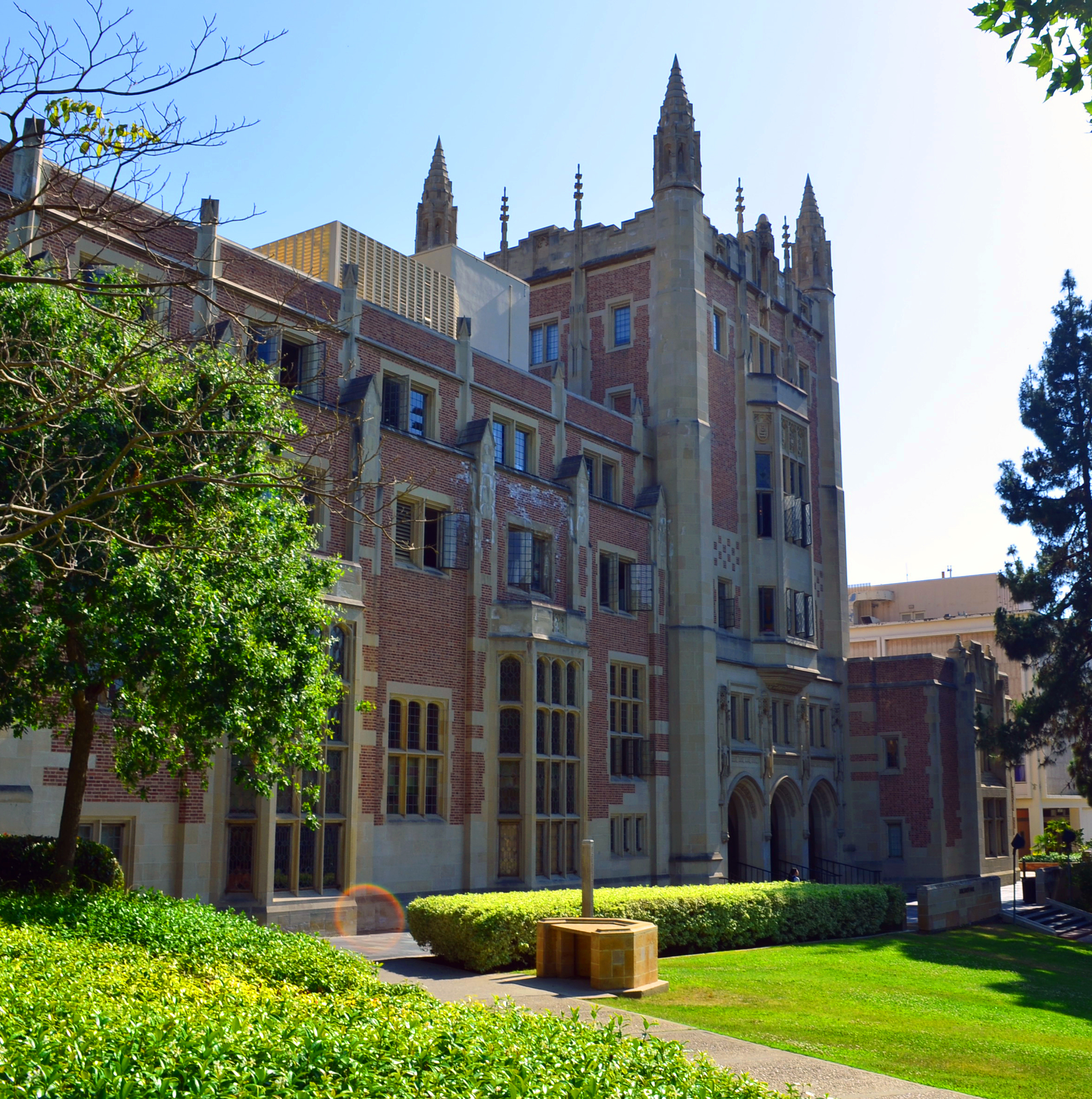
Kerckhoff Hall is home of the Associated Students of the University of California, Los Angeles.

Each UC campus handles admissions separately, but a student wishing to apply for an undergraduate or transfer admission uses one application for all UC campuses. Graduate and professional school admissions are handled directly and separately by each department or program to which one applies.

In May 2020, UC approved plans to suspend standardized testing score requirements in admissions until 2024. In May 2021, after a student lawsuit, the University of California announced that it would no longer consider SAT and ACT scores in admissions and scholarship decisions.

The Early Academic Outreach Program (EAOP) was established in 1976 by University of California (UC) in response to the State Legislature's recommendation to expand post-secondary opportunities to all of California's students including those who are first-generation, socioeconomically disadvantaged, and English-language learners. As UC's largest academic preparation program, EAOP assists middle and high school students with academic preparation, admissions requirements, and financial aid requirements for higher education. The program designs and provides services to foster students' academic development, and delivers those services in partnership with other academic preparation programs, schools, other higher education institutions and community/industry partners.

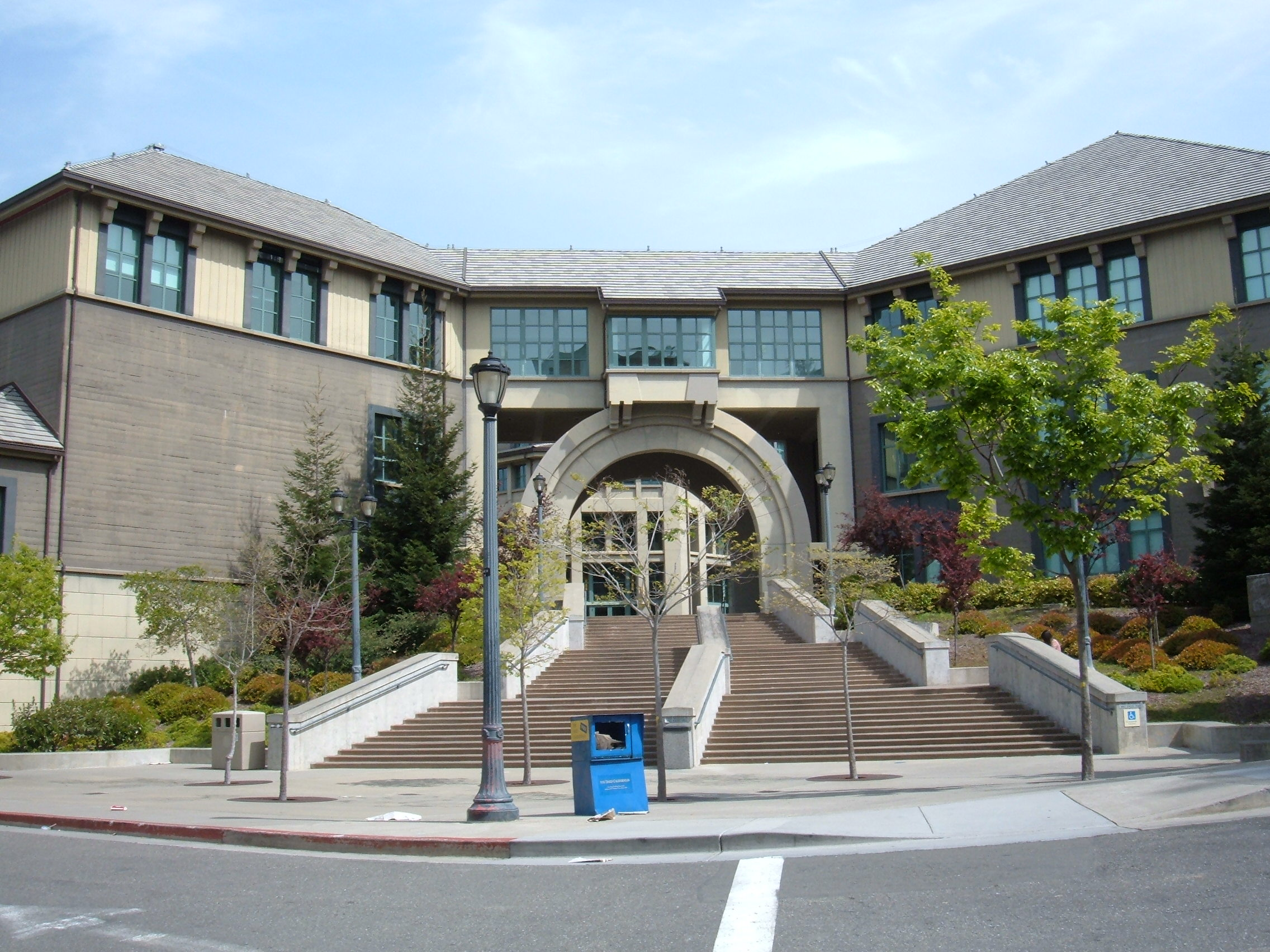
Haas School of Business at Berkeley is ranked among the best business schools in the world.

The University of California admits a significant number of transfer students primarily from the California Community Colleges. Approximately one out of three UC students begin at a community college before graduating. In evaluating a transfer student's application the universities conduct a "comprehensive review" process that includes consideration of grade point averages of the generally required, transferable and or related courses for the intended major. The review may also include consideration of an applicant's enrollment in selective honor courses or programs, extracurricular activities, essay, family history, life challenges, and the location of the student's residence. Different universities emphasize different factors in their evaluations.

=== Freshmen ===
Before 1986, students who wanted to apply to UC for undergraduate study could only apply to one campus. Students who were rejected at that campus but otherwise met the UC minimum eligibility requirements were redirected to another campus with available space. Students who did not want to be redirected were refunded their application fees. UC Riverside chancellor Ivan Hinderaker explained in 1972: "Redirection has been a negative rather than a plus. Some come with a chip on their shoulders so big they never give the campus a chance. They poison the attitudes of the students around them."

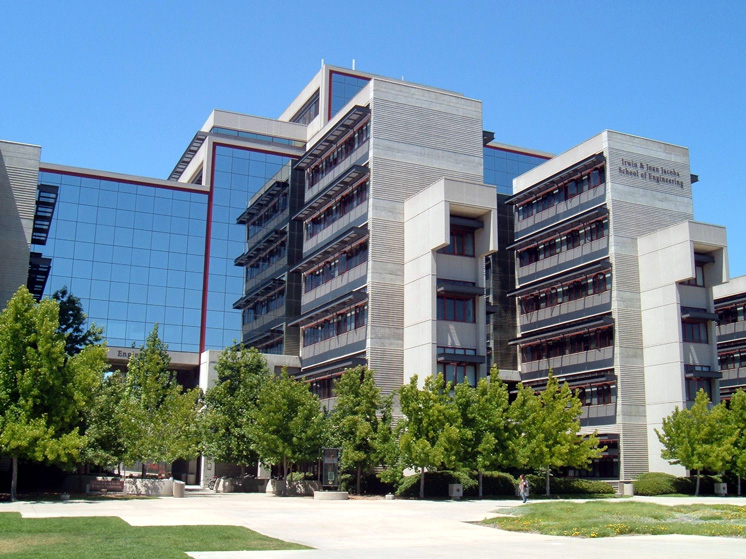
Jacobs School of Engineering, at San Diego, is one of the top-ranked engineering schools in the country.

Therefore, in 1986, the undergraduate application system was changed to the current "multiple filing" system, in which students can apply to as many or as few UC campuses as they want on one application, paying a fee for each campus. This significantly increased the number of applications to the Berkeley and Los Angeles campuses, since students could choose a campus to attend after they received acceptance letters, without fear of being redirected to a campus they did not want to attend.

The University of California accepts fully eligible students from among the top one-eighth (1/8) of California public high school graduates through regular statewide admission, or the top 9% of any given high school class through Eligibility in the Local Context (see below). Part of the eligibility process is completion of the A-G requirements in high school. All eligible California high school students who apply are accepted to the university, though not necessarily to the campus of choice. Eligible students who are not accepted to the campus(es) of their choice are placed in the "referral pool", where campuses with open space may offer admission to those students; in 2003, 10% of students who received an offer through this referral process accepted it. In 2007, about 4,100 UC-eligible students who were not offered admission to their campus of choice were referred to UC Riverside or the system's newest campus, UC Merced.

As of 2026 the San Francisco Chronicle defines "competitive UCs" as UCLA, Berkeley, Irvine, Davis, Santa Barbara, and San Diego, with UCLA and Berkeley the most selective. Santa Cruz, Riverside, and Merced are the least selective. In 2015, all UC-eligible students rejected by their campus of choice were redirected to UC Merced, which is now the only campus that has space for all qualified applicants.

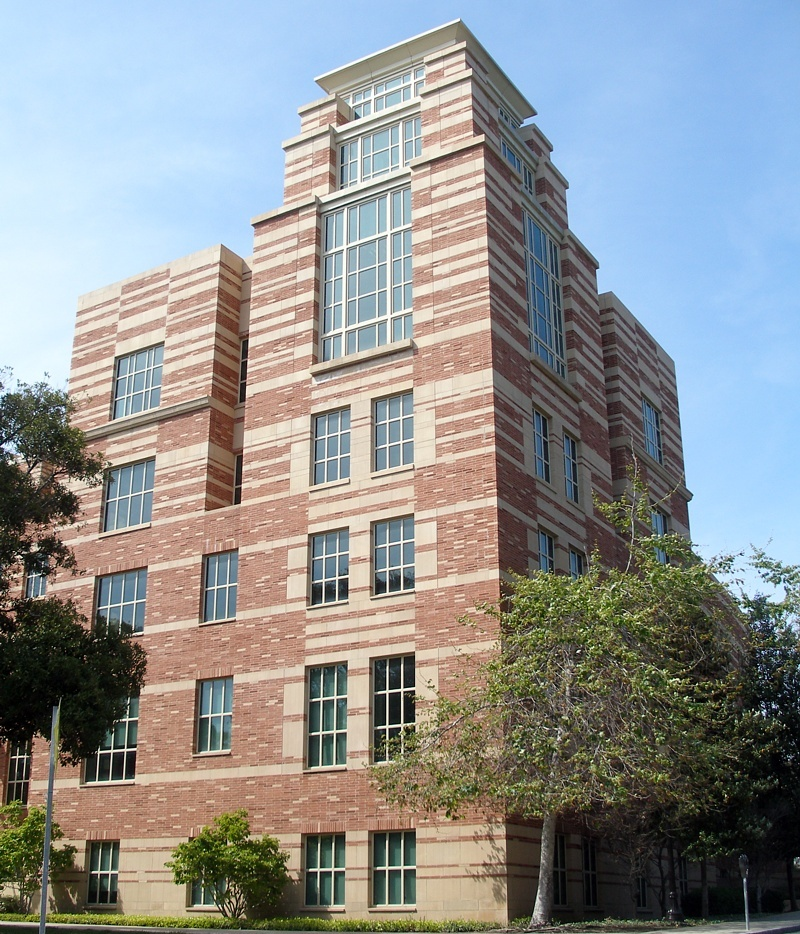
UCLA School of Law is one of the top ranked law schools in the United States.

The old undergraduate admissions were conducted on a two-phase basis. In the first phase, students were admitted based solely on academic achievement. This accounted for between 50 and 75% of the admissions. In the second phase, the university conducted a "comprehensive review" of the student's achievements, including extracurricular activities, essay, family history, and life challenges, to admit the remainder. Students who did not qualify for regular admission were "admitted by exception"; in 2002, approximately 2% of newly admitted undergraduates were admitted by exception.

The process for determining admissions varies. At some campuses, such as Santa Barbara and Santa Cruz, a point system is used to weight grade point average, SAT Reasoning or ACT scores, and SAT Subject scores, while at San Diego, Berkeley, and UCLA, academic achievement is examined in the context of the school and the surrounding community, known as a holistic review.

Race, gender, national origin, and ethnicity were not used as UC admission criteria due to the passing of Proposition 209. This information was collected for statistical purposes.

Eligibility in the Local Context, commonly referred to as ELC, is met by applicants ranked in the top 9% of their high school class in terms of performance on an 11-unit pattern of UC-approved high school courses. Beginning with fall 2007 applicants, ELC also requires a UC-calculated GPA of at least 3.0. Fully eligible ELC students are guaranteed a spot at one of UC's undergraduate campuses, though not necessarily at their first-choice campus or even to a campus to which they applied.

In 2021, the University of California freshmen class was its most diverse and largest ever, with 84,223 students. Latinos were the largest group at 37%; Asian Americans at 34%; white non-Hispanics at 20%; African-Americans at 5%; and 4% composed of American Indians, Pacific Islanders or those who declined to state their race or ethnicity.

=== Student profile and outcomes ===
Undergraduate campus diversity (Fall 2024)
Campus	Asian	Black	Hispanic	International	Two or more races	Unknown	White	Low-income
Berkeley	35%	2%	22%	10%	7%	4%	20%	30%
Davis	31%	2%	25%	13%	7%	2%	20%	34%
Irvine	37%	2%	27%	12%	6%	2%	13%	37%
Los Angeles	30%	3%	24%	8%	8%	3%	24%	30%
Merced	24%	5%	55%	1%	5%	1%	9%	60%
Riverside	36%	4%	40%	4%	5%	2%	10%	48%
San Diego	35%	2%	27%	11%	6%	2%	17%	36%
Santa Barbara	18%	2%	27%	9%	10%	3%	32%	30%
Santa Cruz	24%	2%	29%	3%	9%	2%	31%	33%

Undergraduate student success outcomes (Fall 2024)
Campus	Retention rate (Note: The percentage of full-time students who return to this college after completing their freshman year.)	Graduation rate (Note: The percentage of students who graduate within 8 years of starting at this college.)	Net price (Note: The average yearly cost to attend this college for students from a family income of $0K to $30K, minus any grants and scholarships the student receives. For public colleges, this is the cost for in-state students.)	Federal loan rate (Note: The percentage of undergraduate students who borrowed federal loans to help pay for college.)	Median debt (Note: The median federal loan debt of graduates of this college. This includes only federal loans taken out at this college, and excludes private student loans, Parent PLUS loans, and federal loans taken out at other colleges.)	Median earnings (Note: The median yearly incomes of former students who received federal aid 4 years after graduating from the college.)
Berkeley	97%	94%	$5,110	17%	$12,416	$96,018
Davis	93%	88%	$8,770	20%	$12,038	$73,086
Irvine	94%	88%	$6,160	20%	$12,821	$74,438
Los Angeles	97%	94%	$7,755	19%	$13,750	$77,677
Merced	83%	71%	$7,387	28%	$13,500	$65,410
Riverside	88%	79%	$6,871	30%	$16,368	$64,926
San Diego	94%	89%	$9,229	23%	$13,000	$83,130
Santa Barbara	92%	88%	$9,523	18%	$11,776	$70,323
Santa Cruz	89%	79%	$9,973	28%	$15,000	$67,085

=== Admissions practices ===
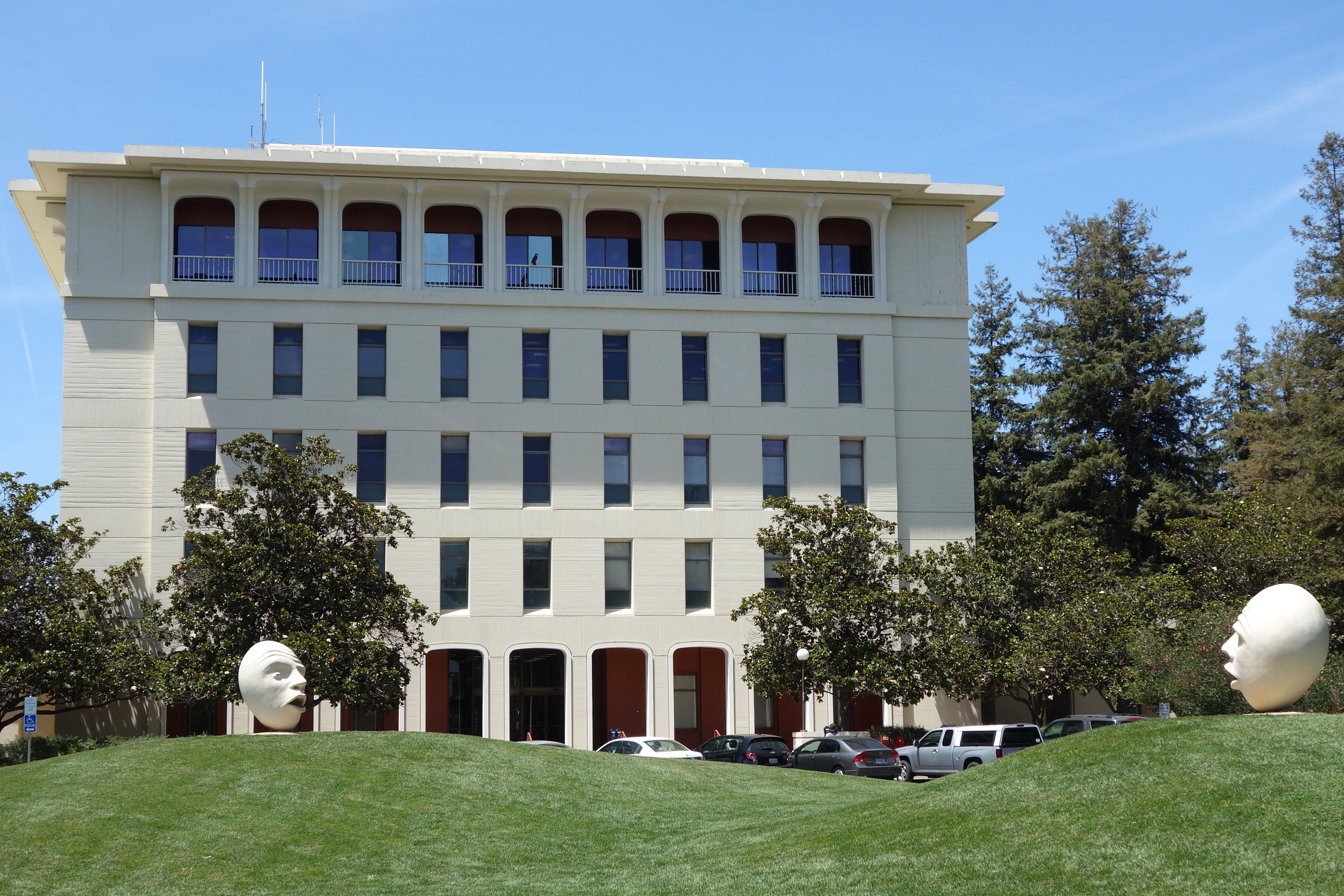
Mrak Hall serves as the administrative seat of UC Davis.

In many recent years, the University of California has faced growing criticism for high admissions of out-of-state or international students as opposed to in-state, California students. In particular, UC Berkeley and UCLA have been heavily criticized for this phenomenon due to their extraordinarily low acceptance rates compared to other campuses in the system. At a Board of Regents meeting in 2015, California Governor Jerry Brown reportedly said about the problem: "And so you got your foreign students and you got your 4.0 folks, but just the kind of ordinary, normal students, you know, that got good grades but weren't at the top of the heap there—they're getting frozen out." State lawmakers have proposed legislation that would reduce out-of-state admission.

A 2020 California auditor's report indicated that at least 64 wealthy students were wrongfully admitted to UC schools as favors to powerful figures. Many of the admissions were justified by falsely classifying the applicants as student athletes. The incidents disproportionately (55 of 64) occurred at UC Berkeley.

== Research ==
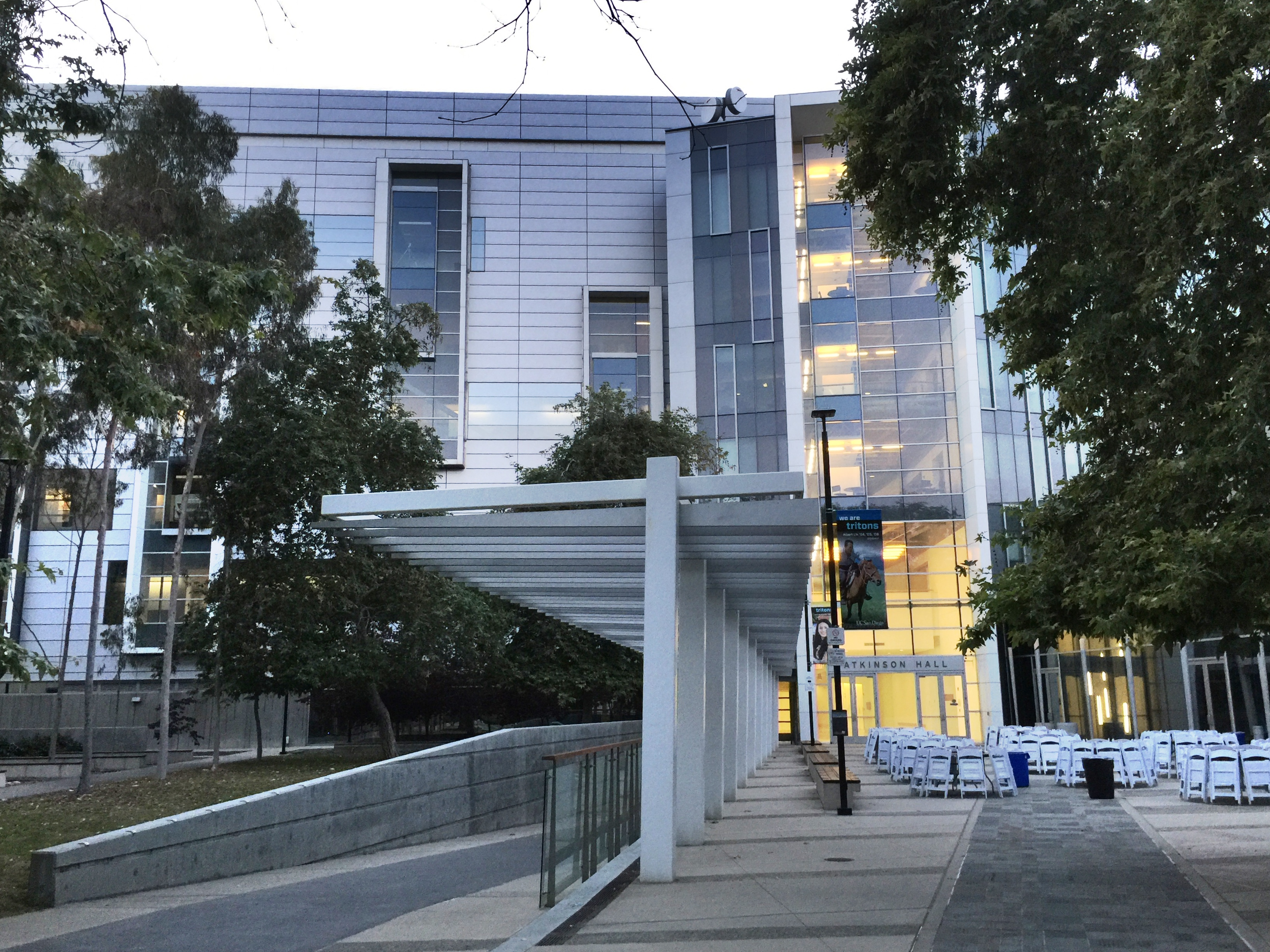
The California Institute for Telecommunications and Information Technology, jointly run by UC San Diego, UC Irvine, and UC Riverside.

In 2006 the Scholarly Publishing and Academic Resources Coalition (SPARC) awarded the University of California the SPARC Innovator Award for its "extraordinarily effective institution-wide vision and efforts to move scholarly communication forward", including the 1997 founding (under then UC President Richard C. Atkinson) of the California Digital Library (CDL) and its 2002 launching of CDL's eScholarship, an institutional repository. The award also specifically cited the widely influential 2005 academic journal publishing reform efforts of UC faculty and librarians in "altering the marketplace" by publicly negotiating contracts with publishers, as well as their 2006 proposal to amend UC's copyright policy to allow open access to UC faculty research.

On July 24, 2013, the UC Academic Senate adopted an Open Access Policy, mandating that all UC faculty produced research with a publication agreement signed after that date be first deposited in UC's eScholarship open access repository.

University of California systemwide research on the SAT exam found that, after controlling for familial income and parental education, so-called achievement tests known as the SAT II had 10 times more predictive ability of college aptitude than the SAT I.

== Peripheral enterprises ==
The University of California has a long tradition of involvement in many enterprises that are often geographically or organizationally separate from its general campuses, including national laboratories, observatories, hospitals, continuing education programs, hotels, conference centers, an airport, a seaport, and an art institute.

=== National laboratories ===
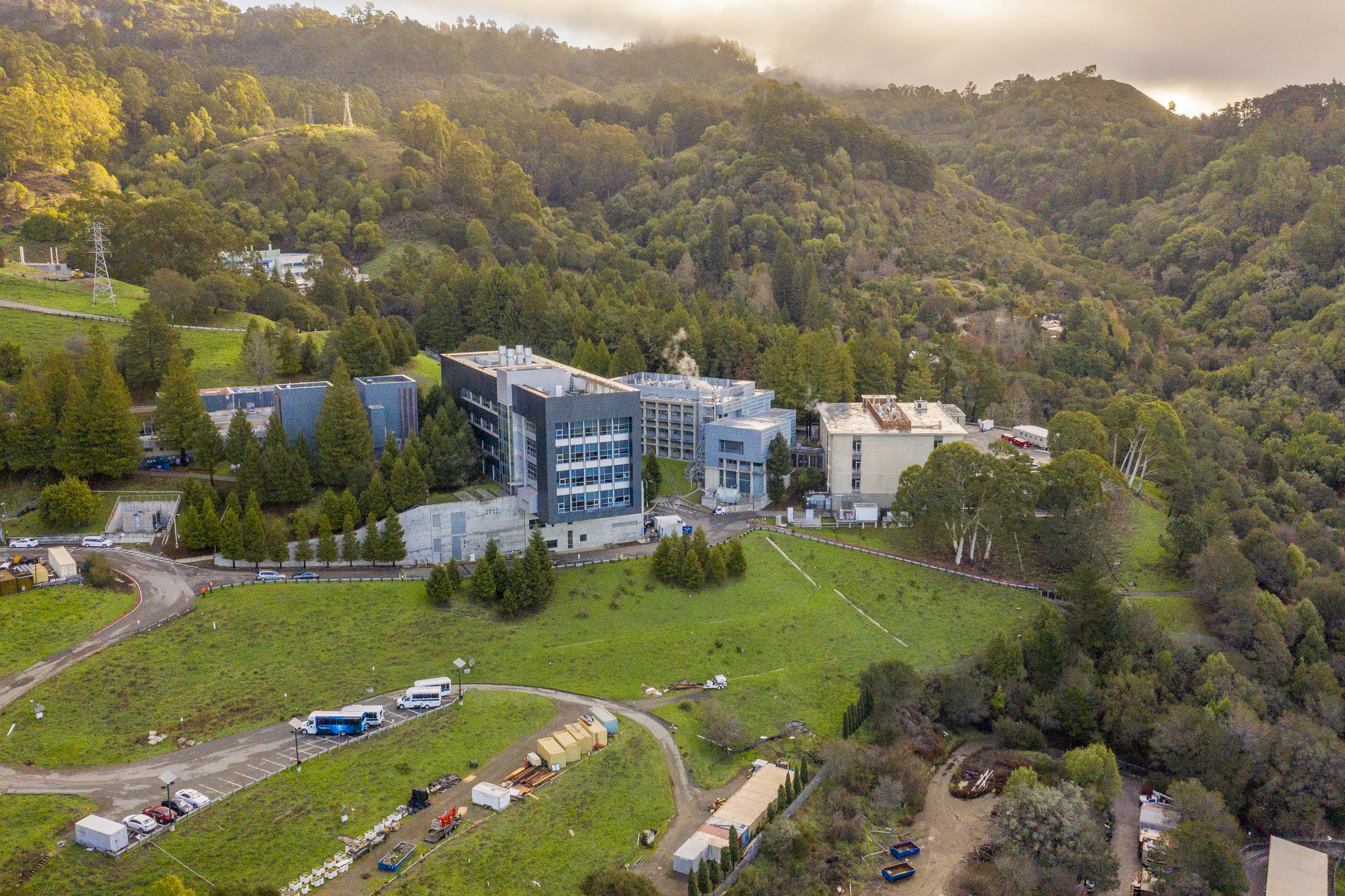
Lawrence Berkeley National Laboratory in the Berkeley Hills.

The University of California directly manages and operates one United States Department of Energy National Laboratory:

- Lawrence Berkeley National Laboratory (LBNL, or Berkeley Lab) (Berkeley, California)

UC is a limited partner in two separate private limited liability companies that manage and operate two other Department of Energy national laboratories:

- Los Alamos National Laboratory (LANL) (Los Alamos, New Mexico) operated by Triad National Security, LLC.
- Lawrence Livermore National Laboratory (LLNL) (Livermore, California) operated by Lawrence Livermore National Security, LLC.

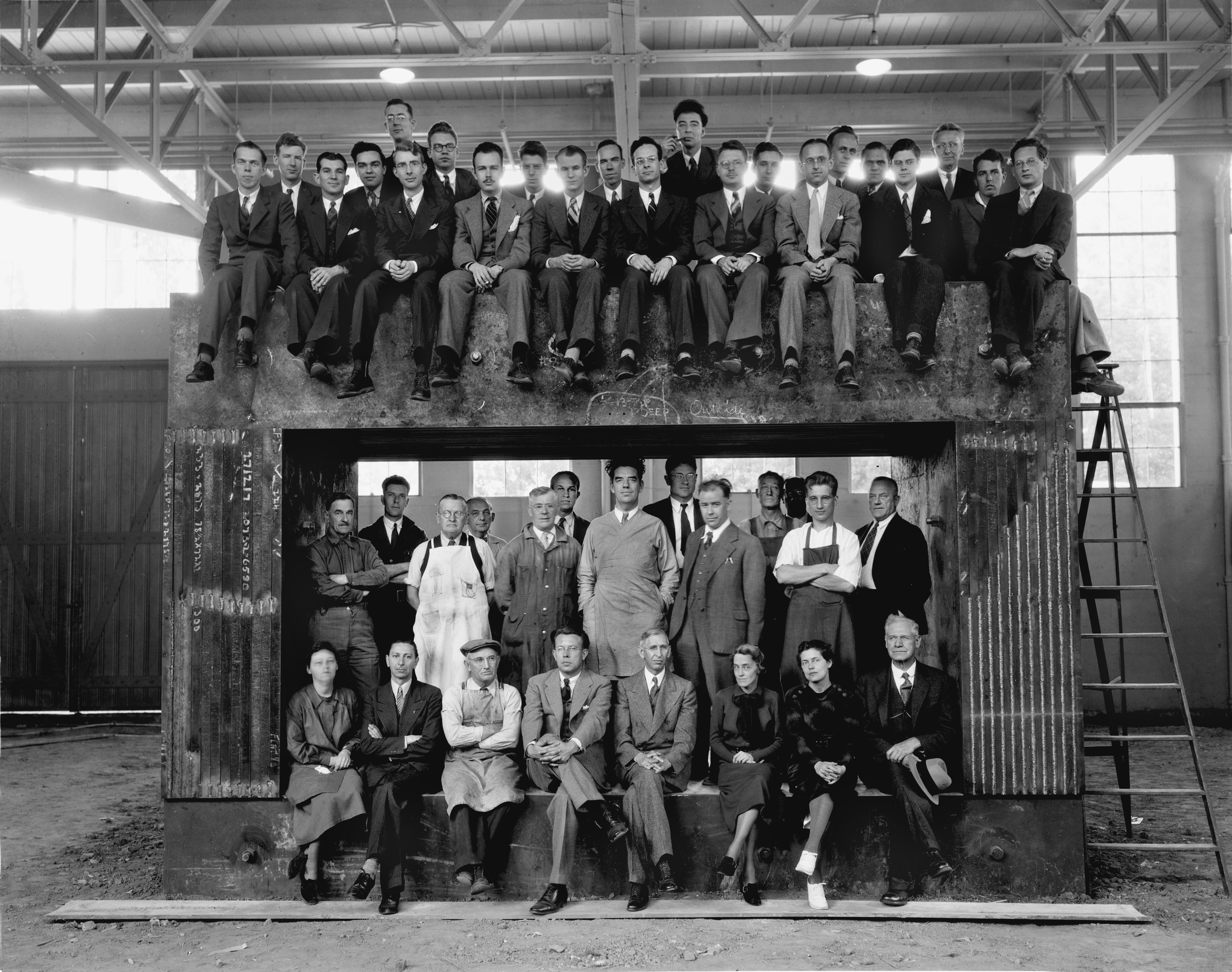
Lawrence Berkeley National Laboratory staff on the magnet yoke for the 60-inch cyclotron, 1938; Nobel prize winners Ernest Lawrence, Edwin McMillan, and Luis Alvarez are shown, in addition to J. Robert Oppenheimer and Robert R. Wilson.

The Lawrence Berkeley National Laboratory conducts unclassified research across a wide range of scientific disciplines with key efforts focused on fundamental studies of the universe, quantitative biology, nanoscience, new energy systems and environmental solutions, and the use of integrated computing as a tool for discovery.

The Lawrence Livermore National Laboratory uses advanced science and technology to ensure that U.S. nuclear weapons remain reliable. LLNL also has major research programs in supercomputing and predictive modeling, energy and environment, bioscience and biotechnology, basic science and applied technology, counter-proliferation of weapons of mass destruction, and homeland security. It is also home to the most powerful supercomputers in the world.

The Los Alamos National Laboratory focuses most of its work on ensuring the reliability of U.S. nuclear weapons. Other work at LANL involves research programs into preventing the spread of weapons of mass destruction and US national security, such as protection of the US homeland from terrorist attacks.

The UC system's ties to the three laboratories have occasionally sparked controversy and protest, because all three laboratories have been intimately linked with the development of nuclear weapons. During the World War II Manhattan Project, Lawrence Berkeley Lab developed the electromagnetic method for the separation of uranium isotopes used to develop the first atomic bombs. The Los Alamos and Lawrence Livermore labs have been involved in designing U.S. nuclear weapons from their inception until the shift into stockpile stewardship after the end of the Cold War. Historically the two national laboratories in Berkeley and Livermore named after Ernest O. Lawrence, have had very close relationships on research projects, as well as sharing some business operations and staff. In fact, LLNL was not officially severed administratively from LBNL until the early 1970s. They also have much deeper ties to the university than the Los Alamos Lab, a fact seen in their respective original names; the University of California Berkeley Radiation Laboratory and the University of California Radiation Laboratory at Livermore.

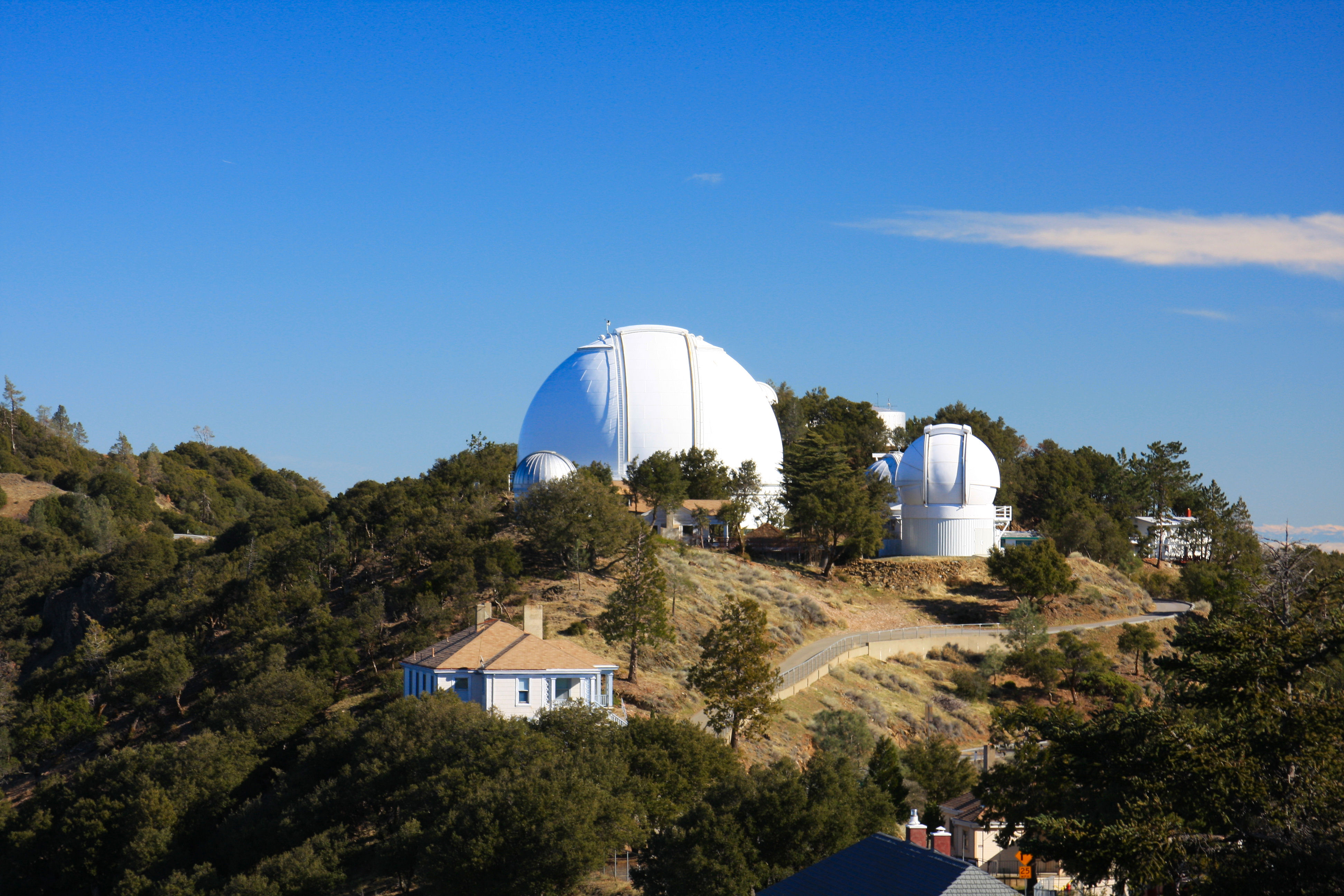
Lick Observatory, atop Mount Hamilton in the Diablo Range.

The UC system's ties to the labs have so far outlasted all periods of internal controversy. However, in 2003, the U.S. Department of Energy for the first time opened the Los Alamos National Laboratory (LANL) contract for bidding by other vendors. UC entered into a partnership with Bechtel Corporation, BWXT, and the Washington Group International, and together they created a private company called Los Alamos National Security, LLC (LANS). The only other bidder on the LANL contract was a Lockheed Martin Corporation-created company that included, among others, the University of Texas System. In December 2005, a seven-year contract to manage the laboratory was awarded to the Los Alamos National Security, LLC. On October 1, 2007, the University of California ended its direct involvement in operating the Lawrence Livermore National Laboratory. Management of the laboratory was taken over by Lawrence Livermore National Security, LLC, a limited liability company whose members are Bechtel National, the University of California, Babcock & Wilcox, the Washington Division of URS Corporation, Battelle Memorial Institute, and The Texas A&M University System. Other than UC appointing three members to the two separate boards of directors (each with eleven members) that oversee LANS and LLNS, UC now has virtually no responsibility for or direct involvement in either LANL or LLNL. UC policies and regulations that apply to UC campuses and the Lawrence Berkeley National Laboratory in California no longer apply to LANL and LLNL, and the LANL and LLNL directors no longer report to the UC Regents or UC Office of the President.

=== University of California Observatories (UCO) ===
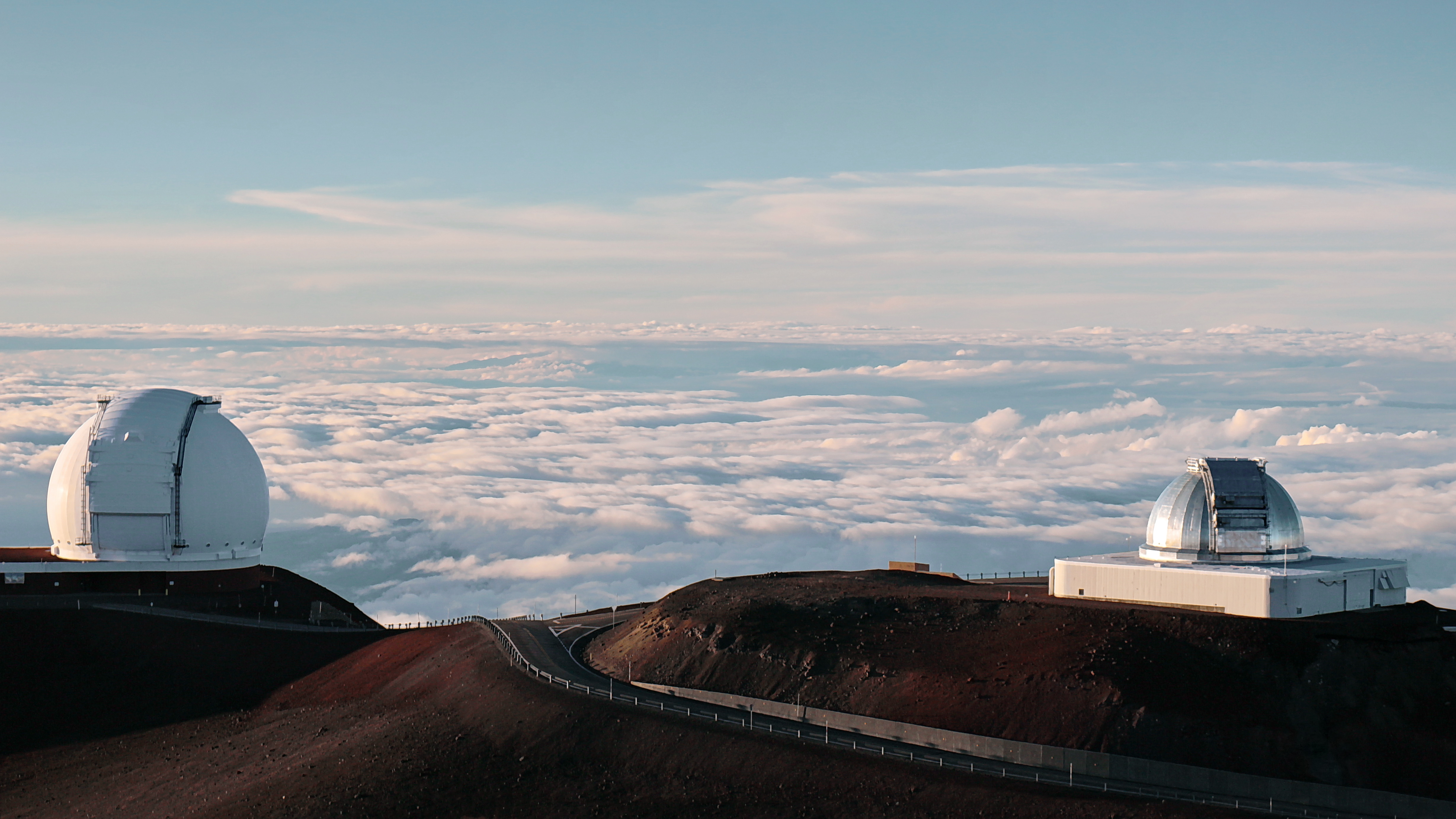
Keck Observatory, atop Mauna Kea volcano on the Big Island of Hawaii.

The University of California manages two observatories as a multi-campus research unit headquartered at UC Santa Cruz.

- Lick Observatory atop Mount Hamilton, in the Diablo Range just east of San Jose.
- Keck Observatory at the 4,145 meters (13,599 feet) summit of Mauna Kea in Hawaii.
- UCO is the center for the university's participation in the Thirty-Meter Telescope (TMT) project.

=== High-performance networking ===
The University of California is a founding and charter member of the Corporation for Education Network Initiatives in California, a nonprofit organization that provides high-performance Internet-based networking to California's K-20 research and education community.

=== UC Natural Reserve System ===
The NRS was established in January 1965 to provide UC faculty with large areas of land where they could conduct long-term ecosystem research without having to worry about outside disturbances like tourists. Today, the NRS manages 39 reserves that total more than 756,000 acres (3,060 km^{2}).

Selected reserves of the University of California Natural Reserve System

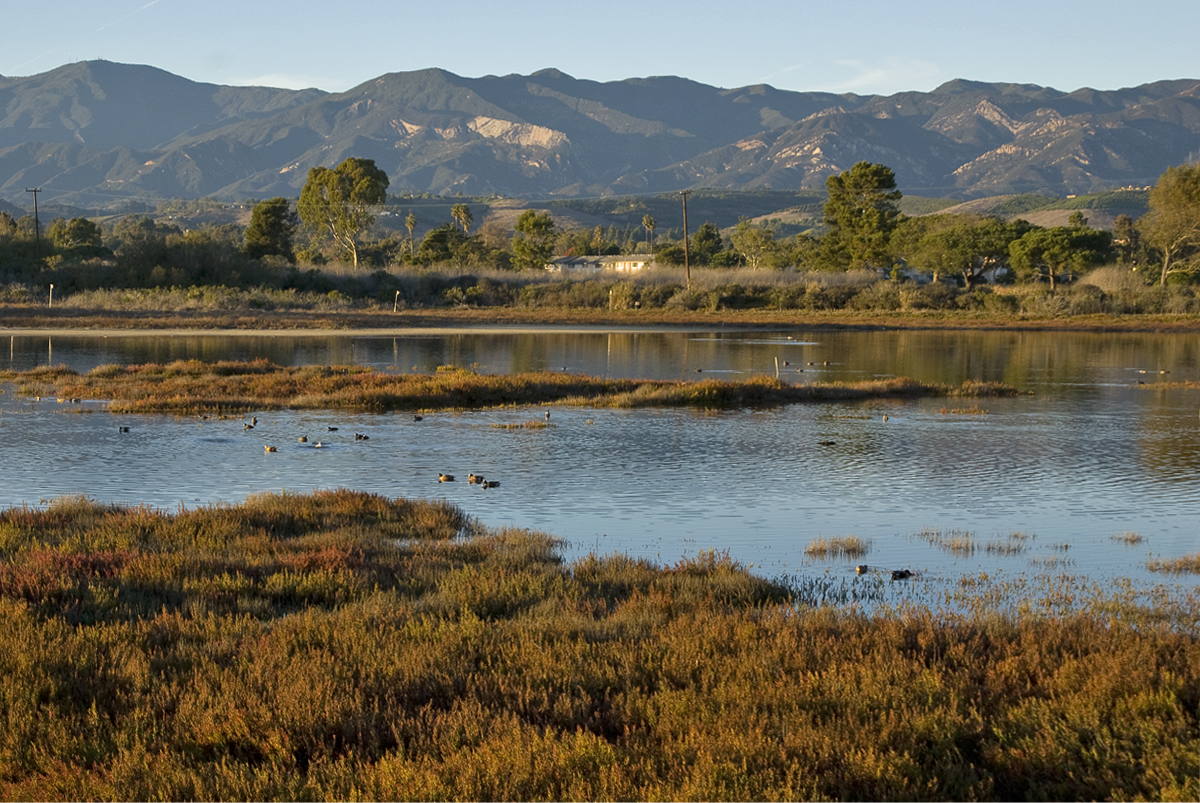
Coal Oil Point Reserve

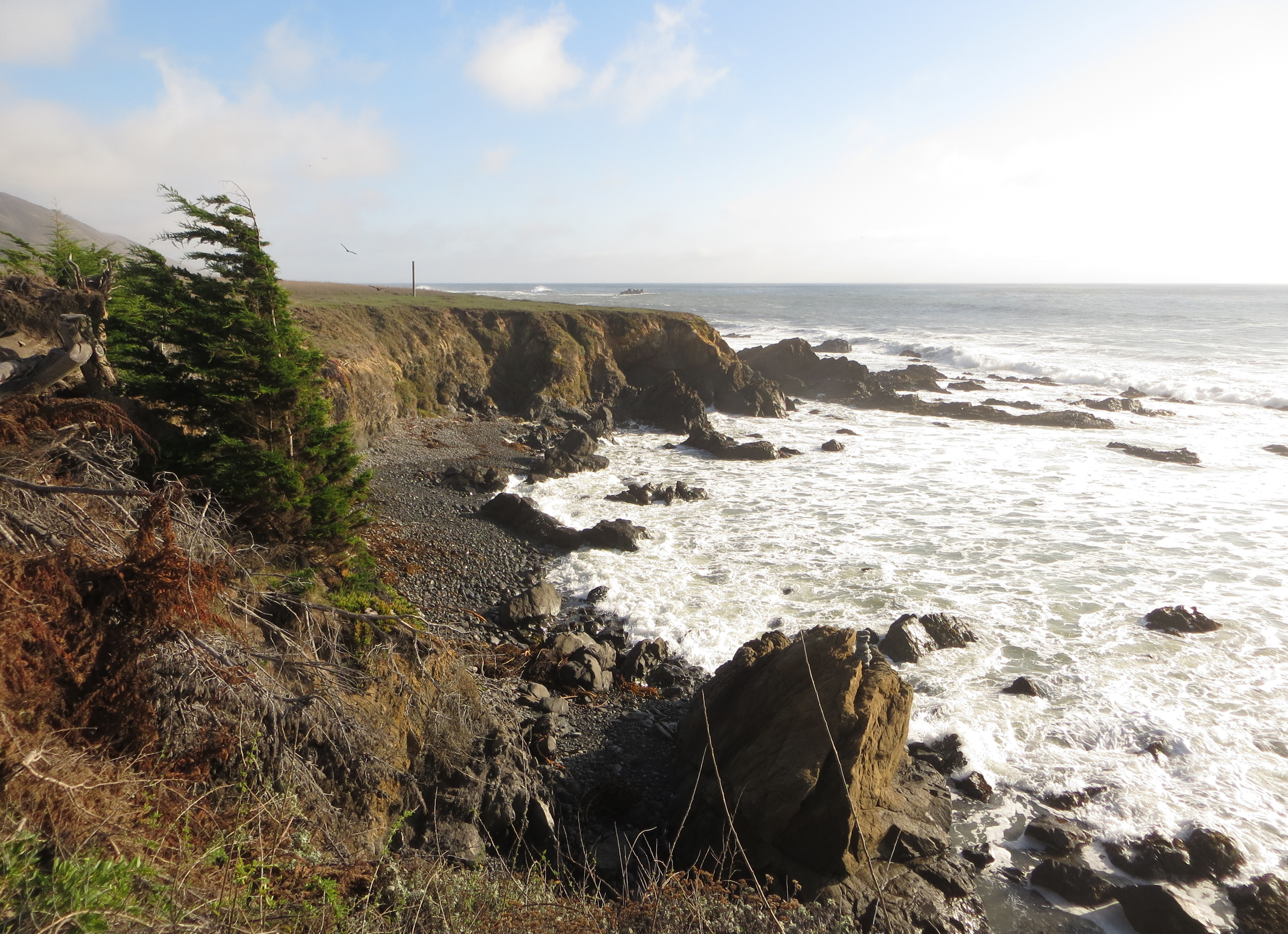
Rancho Marino Reserve

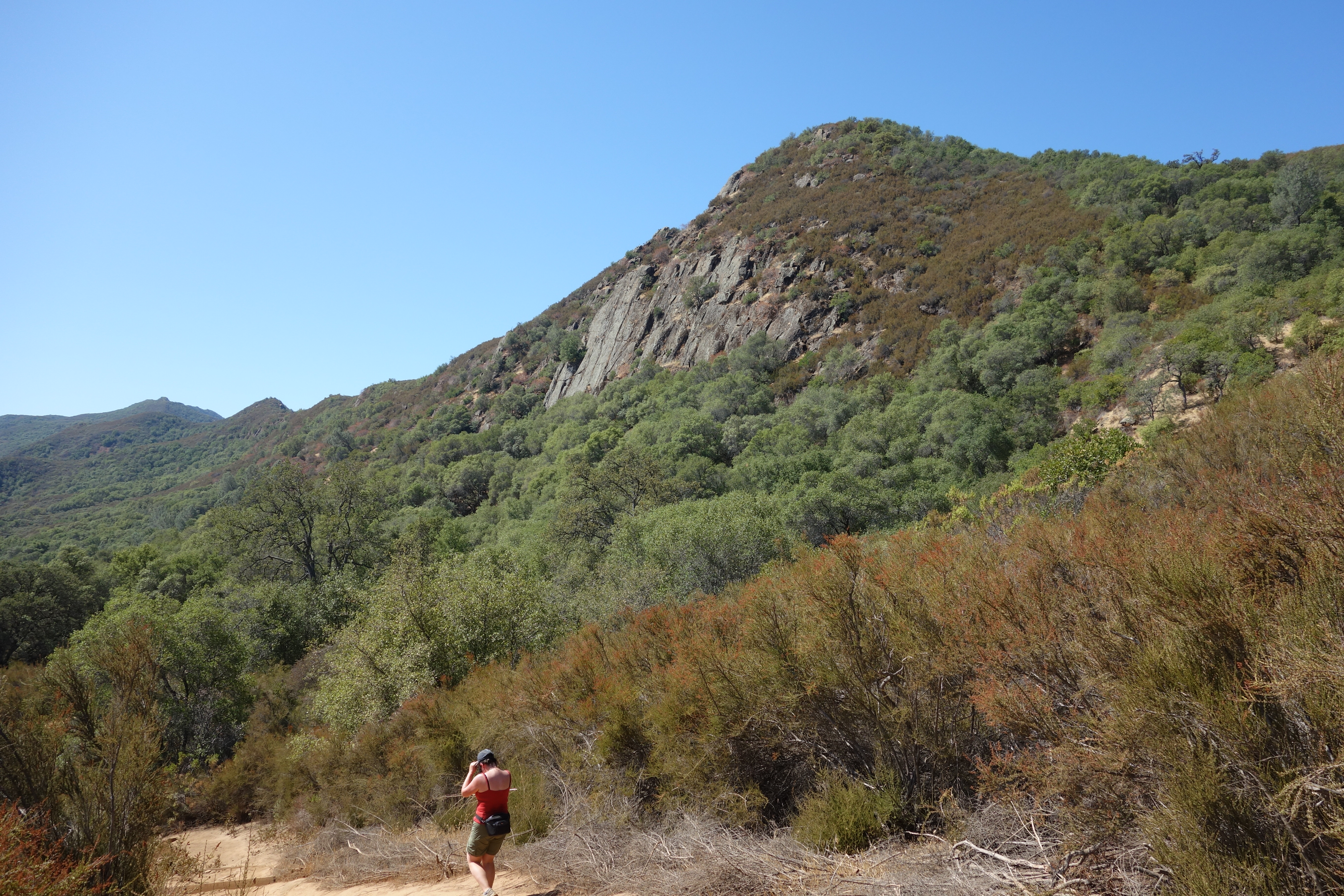
Stebbins Cold Canyon Reserve

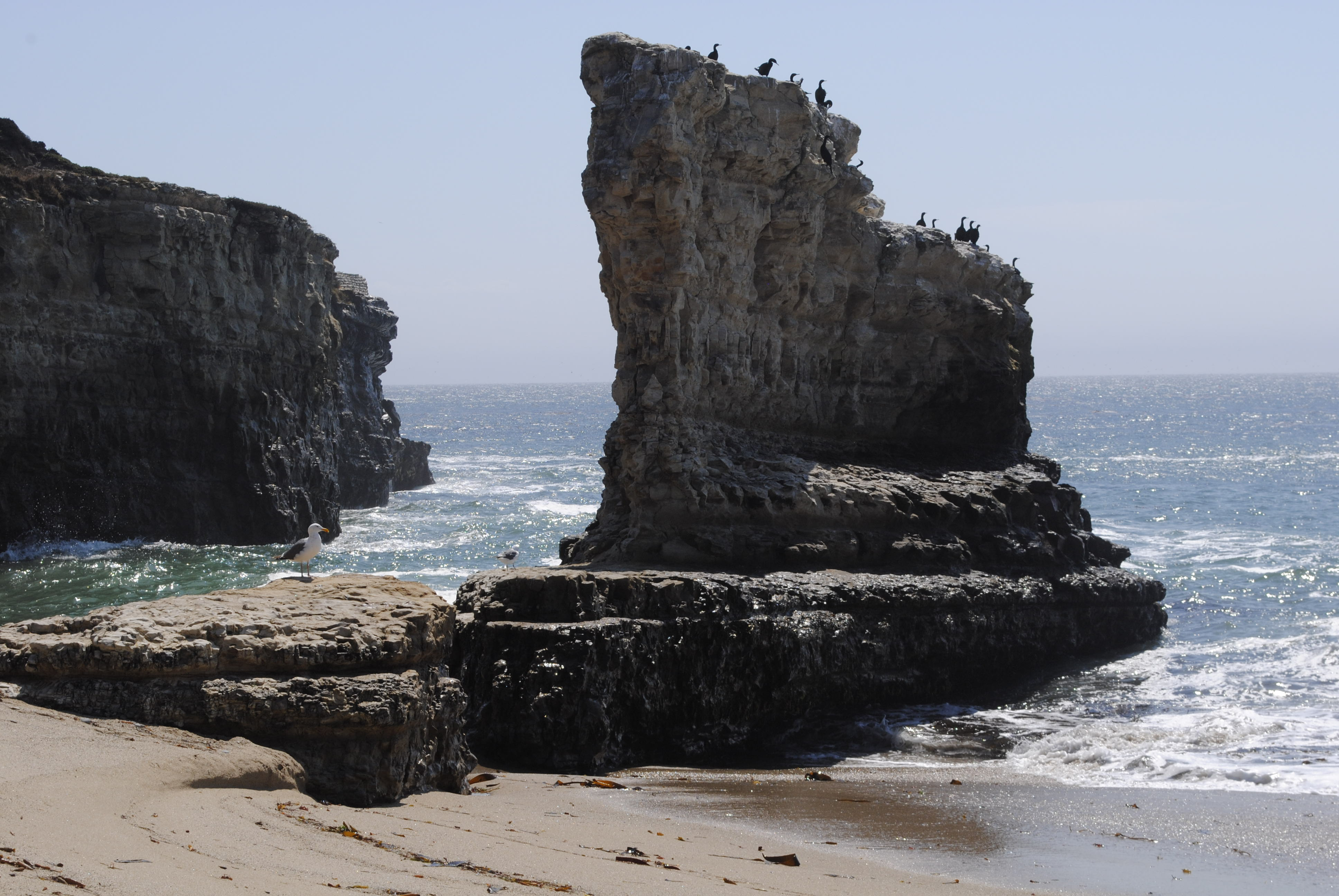
Younger Lagoon Reserve

=== UC Agriculture and Natural Resources ===
University of California Agriculture and Natural Resources (UCANR, Division of Agriculture and Natural Resources) plays an important role in the state's agriculture industry, as mandated by UC's legacy as a land-grant institution. In addition to conducting agriculture and Youth development research, every county in the state has a cooperative extension office with county farm advisors. The county offices also support 4-H programs and have nutrition, family, and consumer sciences advisors who assist local government. Currently, the division's University of California 4-H Youth Development Program is a national leader in studying thriving in the field of youth development.

=== Other national research centers ===
From September 2003 to July 2016, UC managed a contract valued at more than $330 million to establish and operate a University Affiliated Research Center (UARC) at the NASA Ames Research Center at Moffett Federal Airfield —the largest grant ever awarded the university. UC Santa Cruz managed the UARC for the University of California, with the goal of increasing the science output, safety, and effectiveness of NASA's missions through new technologies and scientific techniques.

Since 2002, the NSF-funded San Diego Supercomputer Center at UC San Diego has been managed by the University of California, which took over from the previous manager, General Atomics.

=== Medical centers and schools ===
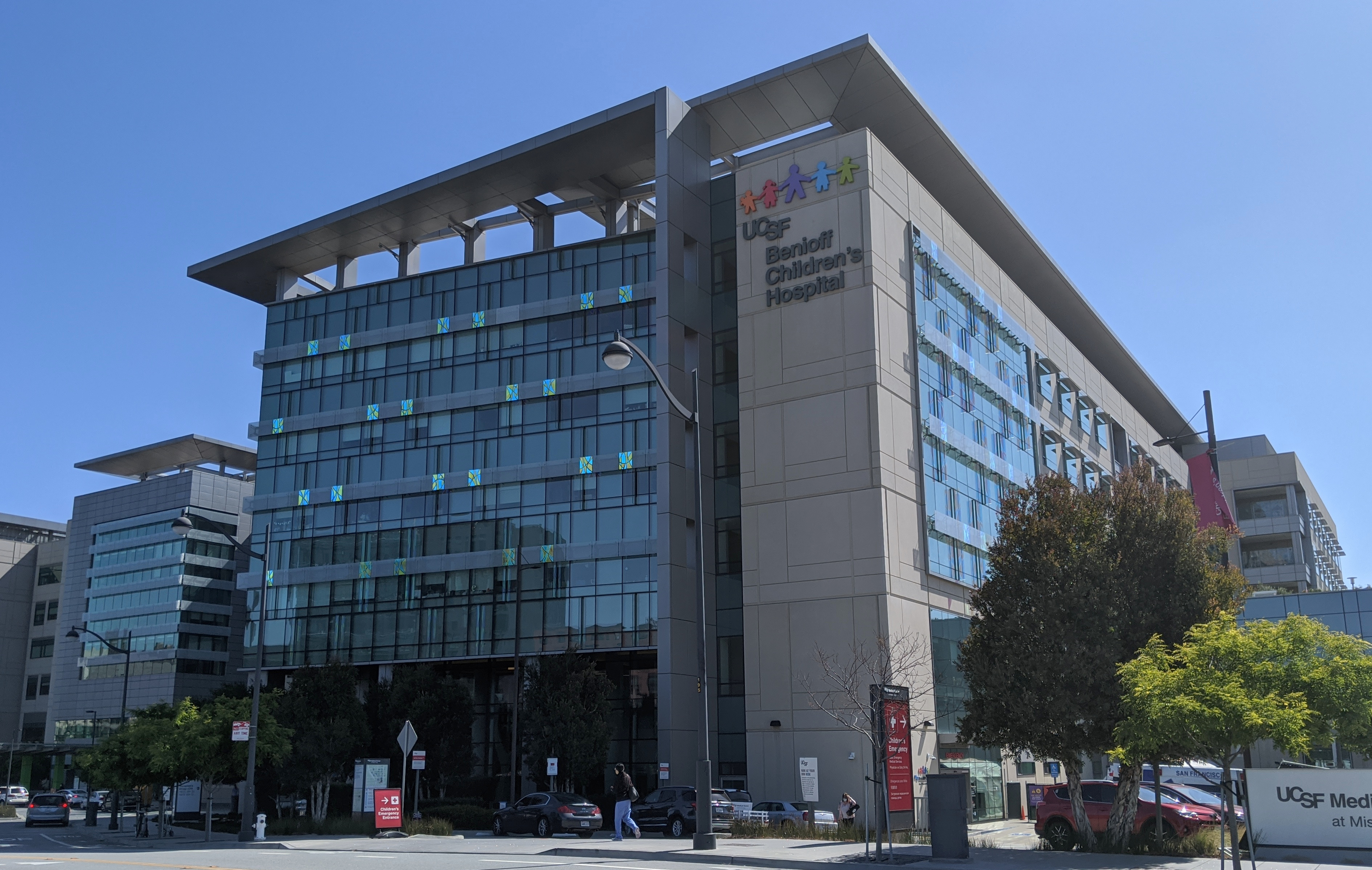
UCSF Benioff Children's Hospital.

The University of California operates five medical centers throughout the state:

- UC Davis Medical Center, in Sacramento;
- UC Irvine Medical Center, in Orange;
- UCLA Medical Center, comprising two distinct hospitals:
  - Ronald Reagan UCLA Medical Center, in Los Angeles;
  - UCLA Santa Monica Medical Center, in Santa Monica;
- UC San Diego Medical Center, comprising two distinct hospitals:
  - UC San Diego Medical Center, Hillcrest, in San Diego;
  - Jacobs Medical Center, in La Jolla; and
- UCSF Medical Center, operating as a single medical center across three physically distinct campuses around San Francisco.
Medical centers of the University of California

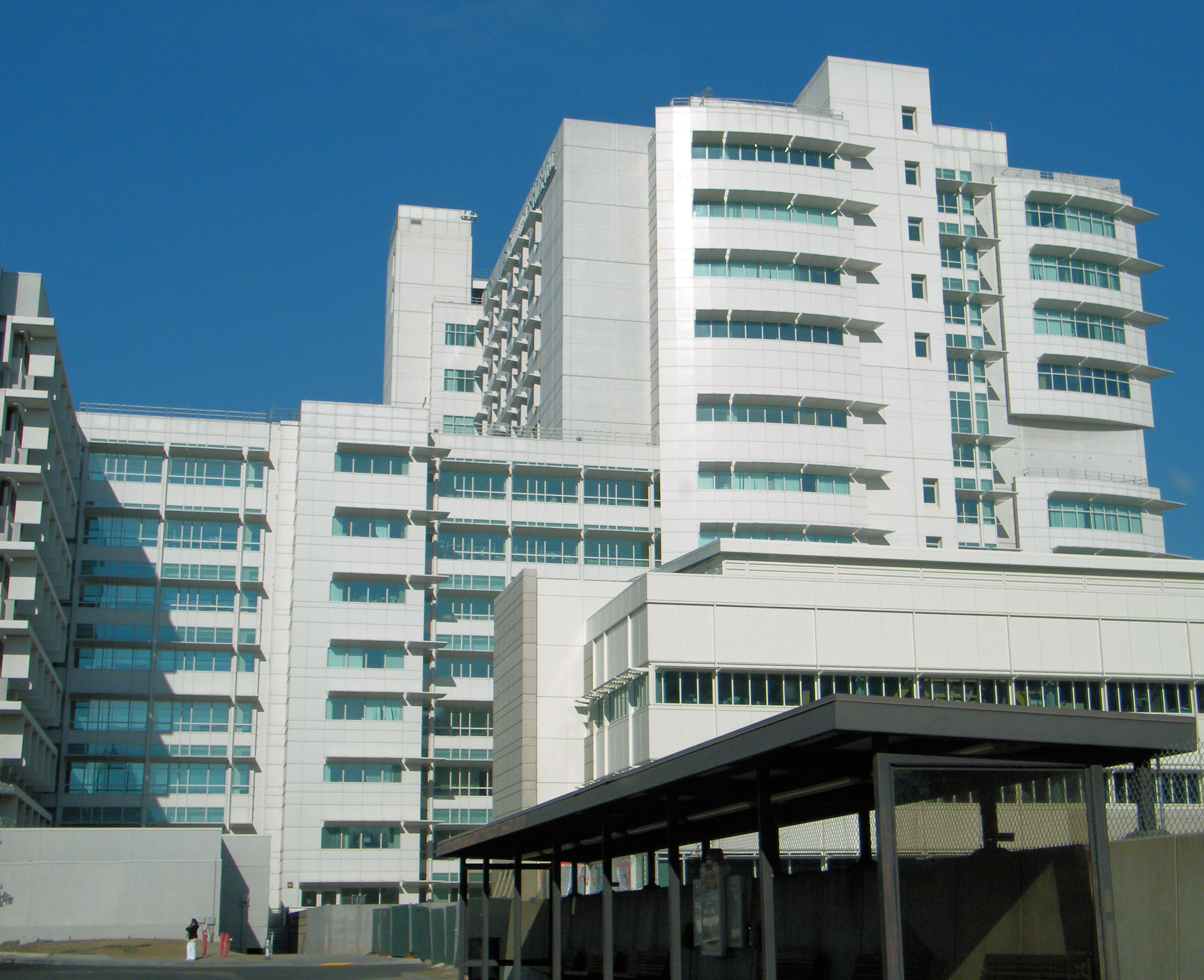
UCD Medical Center

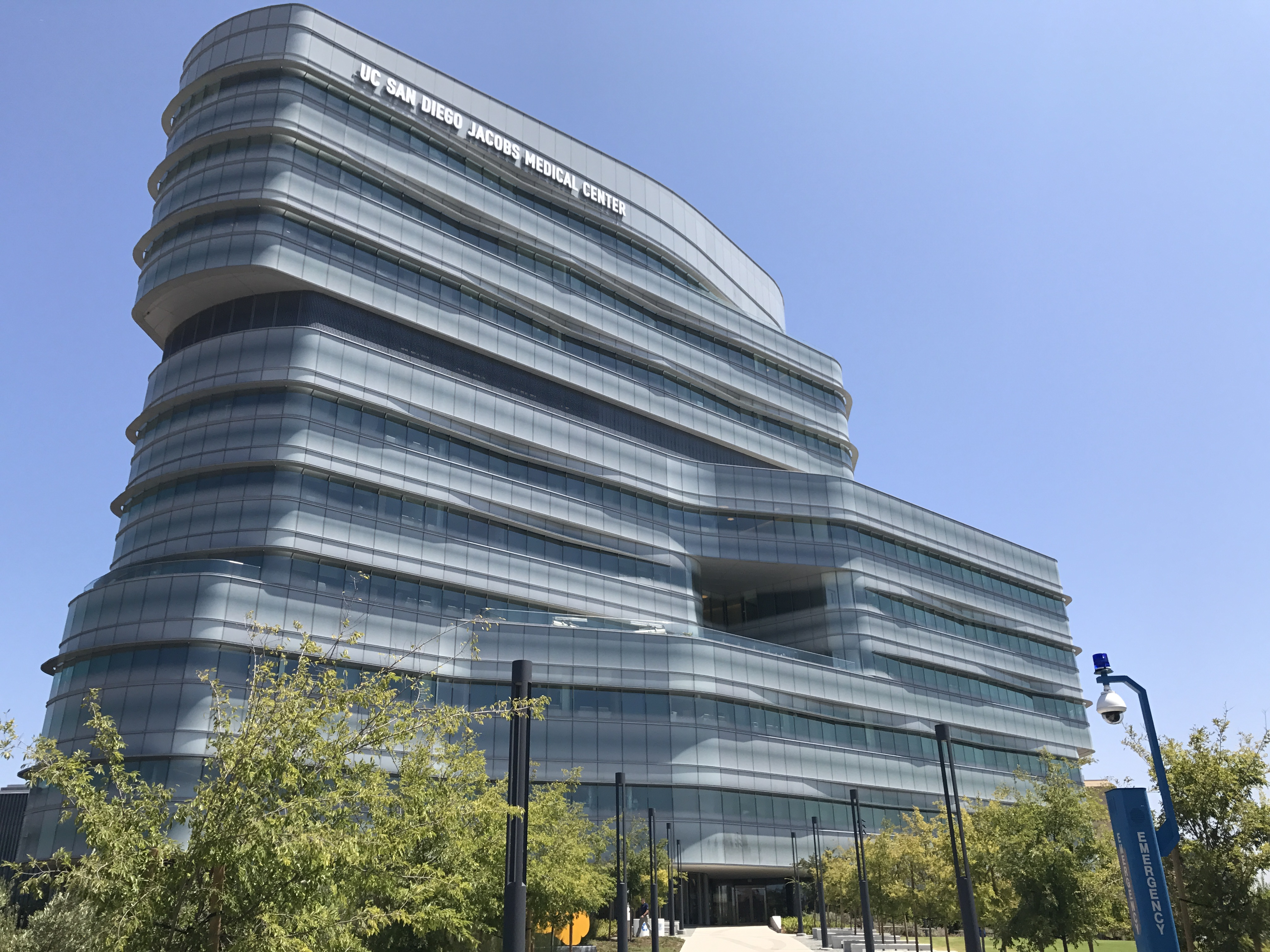
UCSD Medical Center

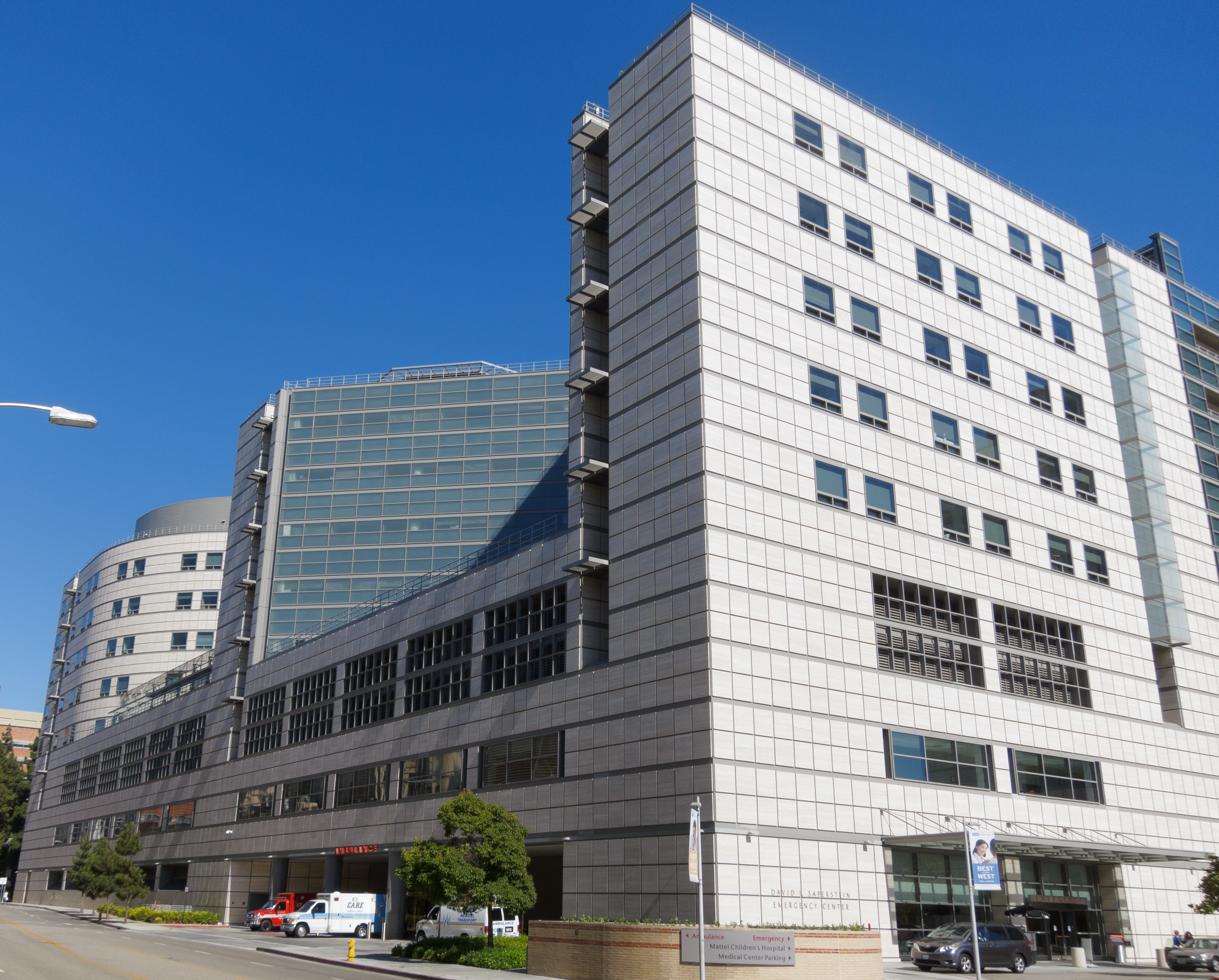
UCLA Medical Center

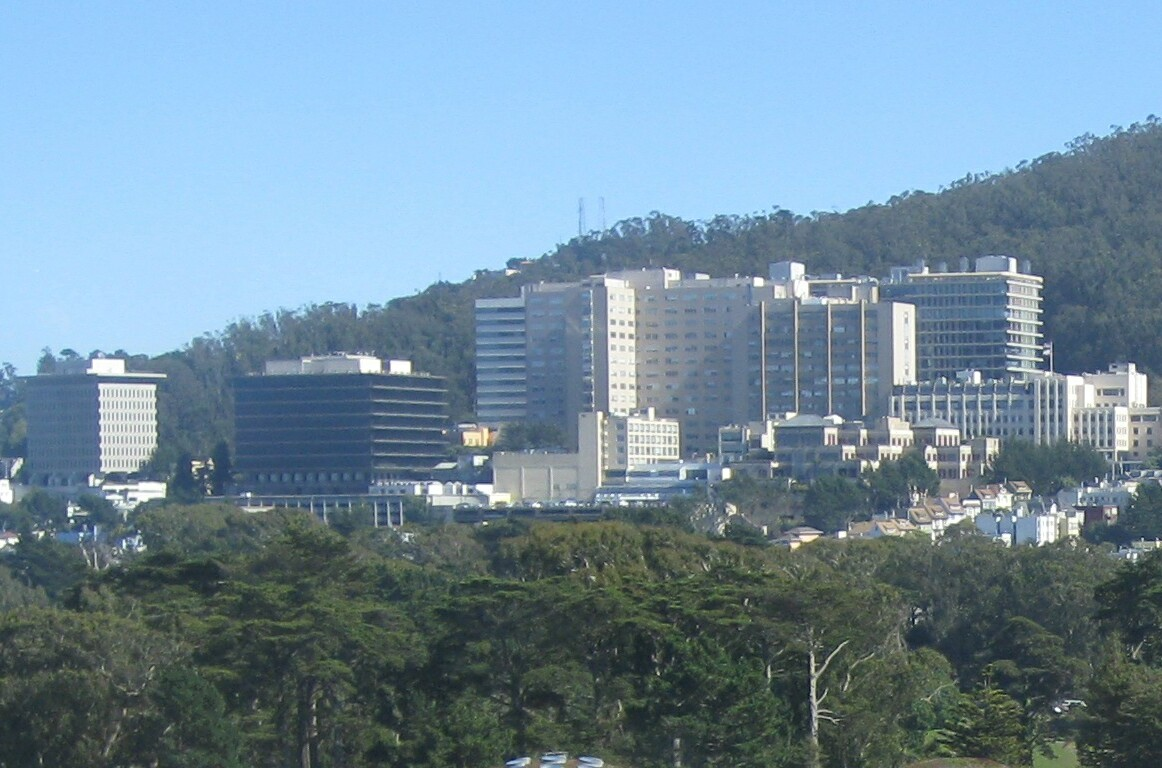
UCSF Medical Center

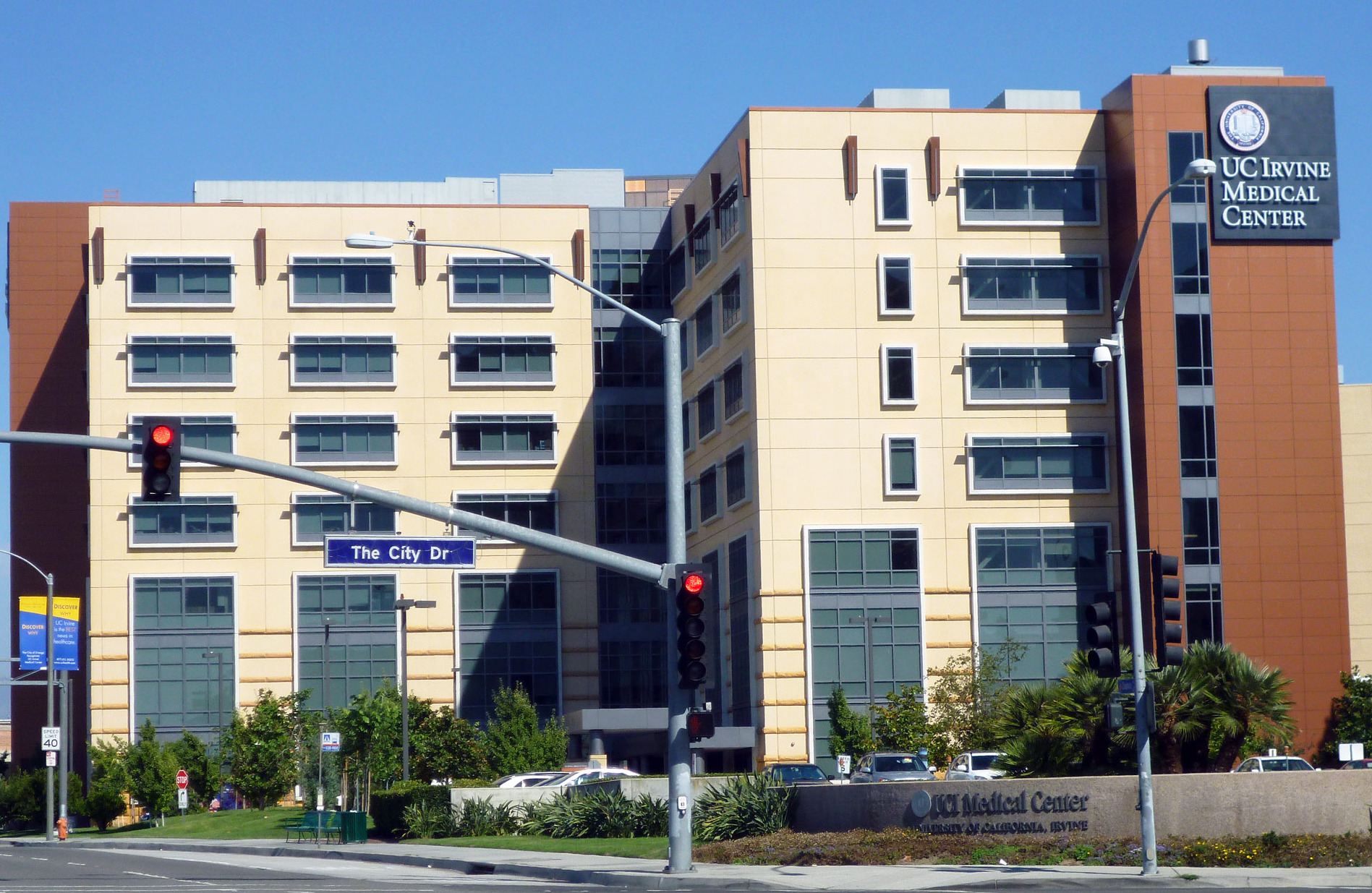
UCI Medical Center

There are two medical centers that bear the UCLA name, but are not operated by UCLA: Harbor–UCLA Medical Center and Olive View–UCLA Medical Center. They are actually Los Angeles County-operated facilities that UCLA uses as teaching hospitals.

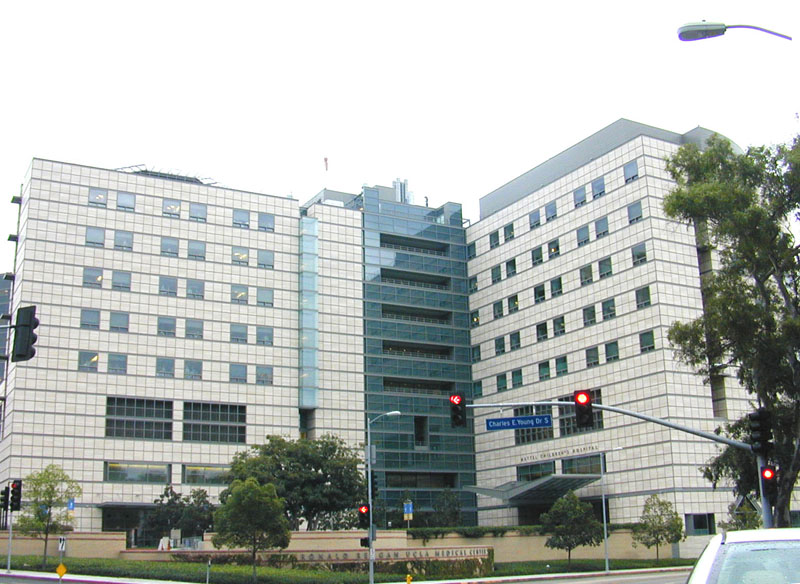
UCLA Mattel Children's Hospital.

Each medical center serves as the primary teaching site for that campus's medical school. UCSF is perennially among the top five programs in both research and primary care, and both UCLA and UC San Diego consistently rank among the top fifteen research schools, according to annual rankings published by U.S. News & World Report. The teaching hospitals affiliated with each school are also highly regarded – the UCSF Medical Center was ranked the number one hospital in California and number 5 in the country by U.S. News & World Report's 2017 Honor Roll for Best Hospitals in the United States. UC also has a sixth medical school—UC Riverside School of Medicine, the only one in the UC system without its own hospital.

In the latter half of the 20th century, the UC hospitals became the cores of full-fledged regional health systems; they were gradually supplemented by many outpatient clinics, offices, and institutes. Three UC hospitals are actually county hospitals that were sold to UC, which means that UC currently plays a major role in providing healthcare to the indigent. The medical hospitals operated by UC Irvine (acquired in 1976), UC Davis (acquired in 1978), and UC San Diego (acquired in 1984) each began as the respective county hospitals of Orange County, Sacramento County, and San Diego County. As of 2025, UC medical centers handle each year about 10.8 million outpatient visits, 474,000 emergency room visits, and roughly 1.32 million inpatient days.

=== Facilities outside of California ===
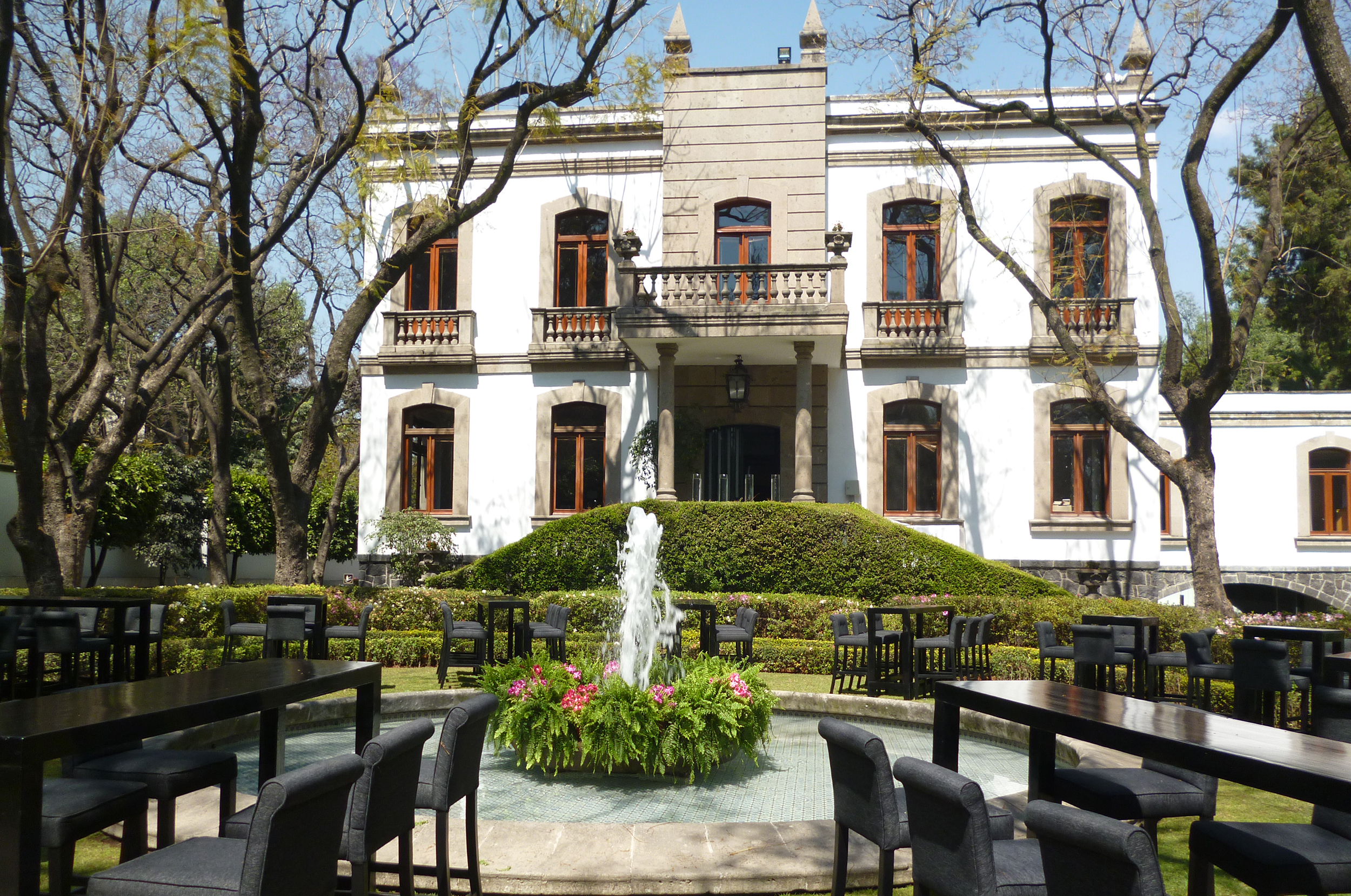
Casa de California in Mexico City.

UC operates several other miscellaneous sites to support faculty, students, and researchers away from its general campuses:

- UC Berkeley operates the Richard B. Gump South Pacific Research Station in Mo'orea, French Polynesia on land donated in 1981 by the heir to the founder of the Gump's home furnishings store.
- UC Davis operates UC Center Sacramento, which supports students from all UC campuses who are interning with the California government.
- UC Davis operates UC Davis Chile Life Sciences Innovation Center in Providencia, Chile, with support from Chilean government agency CORFO. The center is a nonprofit foundation which coordinates technology transfers between Davis and partner institutions in Chile. It is the latest in a series of "technical assistance" programs between the California and Chile governments, dating back to the Chile-California Program of 1963.
- UC Irvine founded UC Washington Center (UCDC) in the federal capital at Washington, D.C. UCDC includes a dormitory to host UC students interning with the federal government. It is now jointly operated and supported by all nine UC campuses which admit undergraduates.
- UC Riverside currently operates one overseas site on behalf of the systemwide Alianza MX program:
  - Casa de California in Mexico City.
- UC Office of the President's Education Abroad Program (EAP) briefly operated California House in London during the early-to-mid 2000s.

=== Hospitality facilities ===
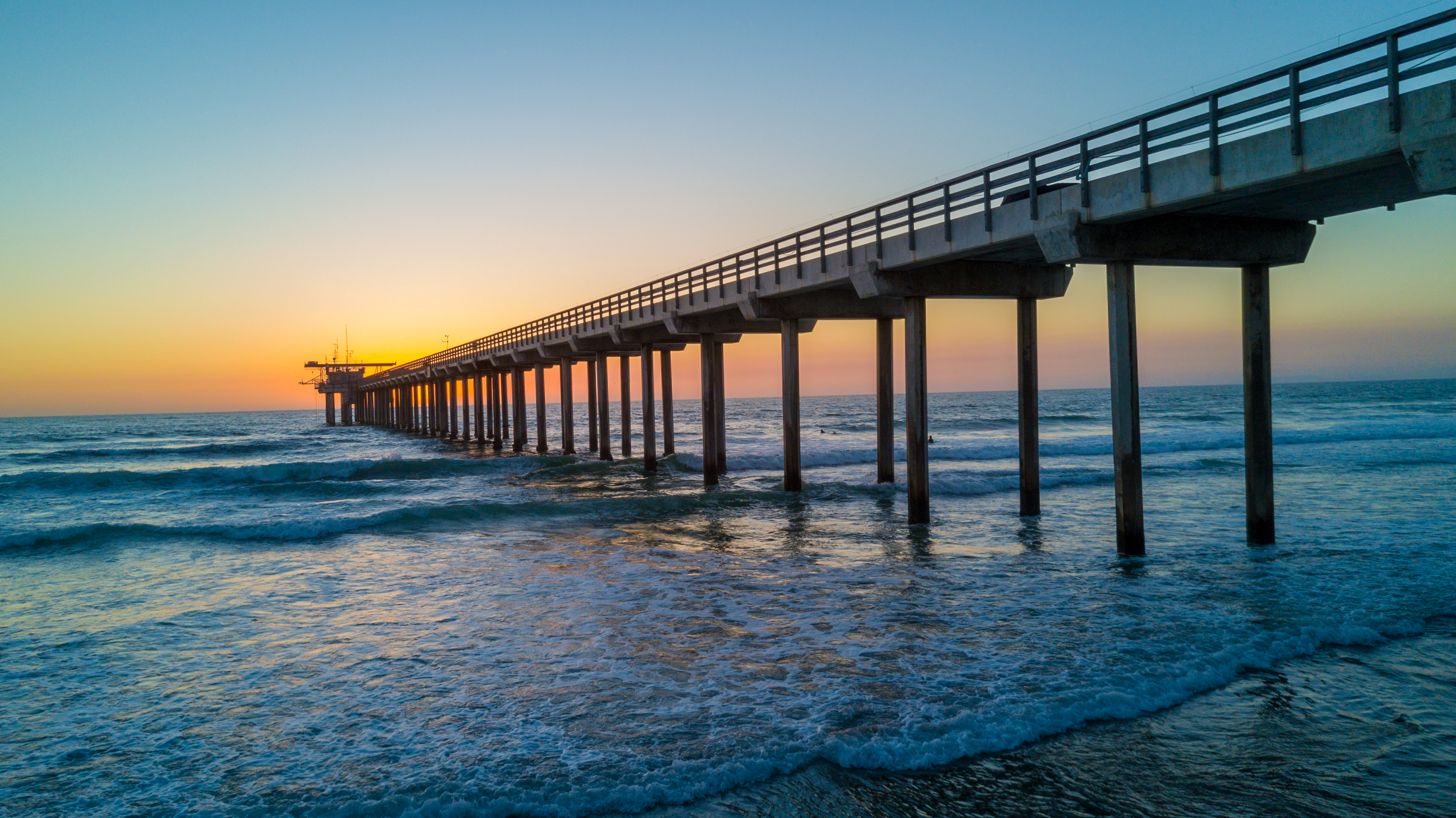
Scripps Institution of Oceanography pier, in La Jolla.

Unlike other land-grant institutions (e.g., Cornell) UC does not provide a hospitality management program, but it does provide general hospitality at some locations:

- UC Berkeley's Cal Alumni Association operates travel excursions for alumni (and their families) under its "Cal Discoveries Travel" brand (formerly BearTreks); many of the tour guides are Berkeley professors. CAA also operates the oldest and largest alumni association-run family camp in the world, the Lair of the Golden Bear. Located at an altitude of 5600 feet in Pinecrest, California, the Lair is a home-away-from-home for almost 10,000 campers annually. Its attendees are largely Cal alumni and their families, but the Lair is open to everyone.
- Berkeley Lab operates its own hotel, the Berkeley Lab Guest House, available to persons with business at the Lab itself or UC Berkeley.
- The UCLA Hospitality Group operates two on-campus hotels, the 61-room Inn at UCLA and the 254-room Meyer and Renee Luskin Conference Center, and the UCLA Lake Arrowhead Lodge at Lake Arrowhead (with a mix of chalet-like condominiums, lodge rooms, and stand-alone cottages). During the summer, Lake Arrowhead hosts the Bruin Woods vacation programs for UCLA alumni and their families.
- Separately, UCLA Health operates the 100-room Tiverton House just south of the UCLA campus to serve its patients and their families.
- UC Santa Cruz leased the University Inn and Conference Center in downtown Santa Cruz from 2001 to 2011 for use as off-campus student housing.

=== University Airport ===
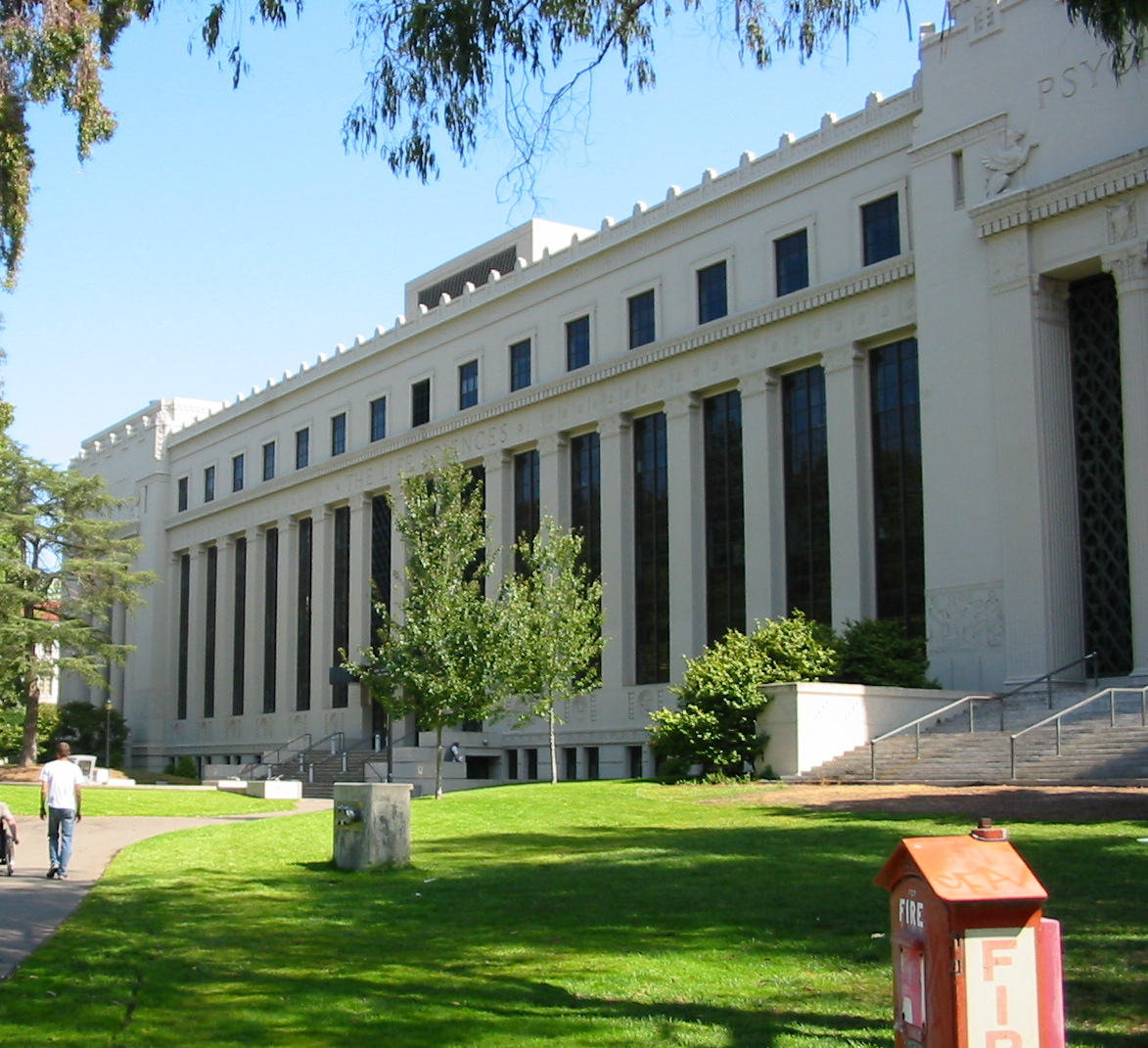
University of California Museum of Paleontology in Berkeley.

UC Davis operates the University Airport as a utility airport for air shuttle service in the contractual transportation of university employees and agricultural samples. It is also a public general aviation airport. University Airport's ICAO identifier is KEDU.

=== Seaport ===
UC San Diego's Scripps Institution of Oceanography owns a seaport, the Nimitz Marine Facility, which is just south of Shelter Island on Point Loma, San Diego. The port is used as an operating base for all of its oceanographic vessels and platforms.

=== UC Extension ===
For over a century, the university has operated a continuing education program for working adults and professionals. At present, UC Extension has enrolled over 700,000 students, (500,000 of which are unique) in over 3,000 courses, with approximately 100,000 students attending during 2022–2023. One of the reasons for its large size is that UC Extension is an approved and the dominant provider of education for WIOA and TAAP workers in California. Also, the systemwide portion of UC Extension (directly controlled by the UC Office of the President) operates Continuing Education of the Bar under a joint venture agreement with the State Bar of California.

== See also ==
- History of education in California
- University of California Press
- University of California Student Association
- Police departments at the University of California
