= Daisy Marguerite Hughes =

American painter

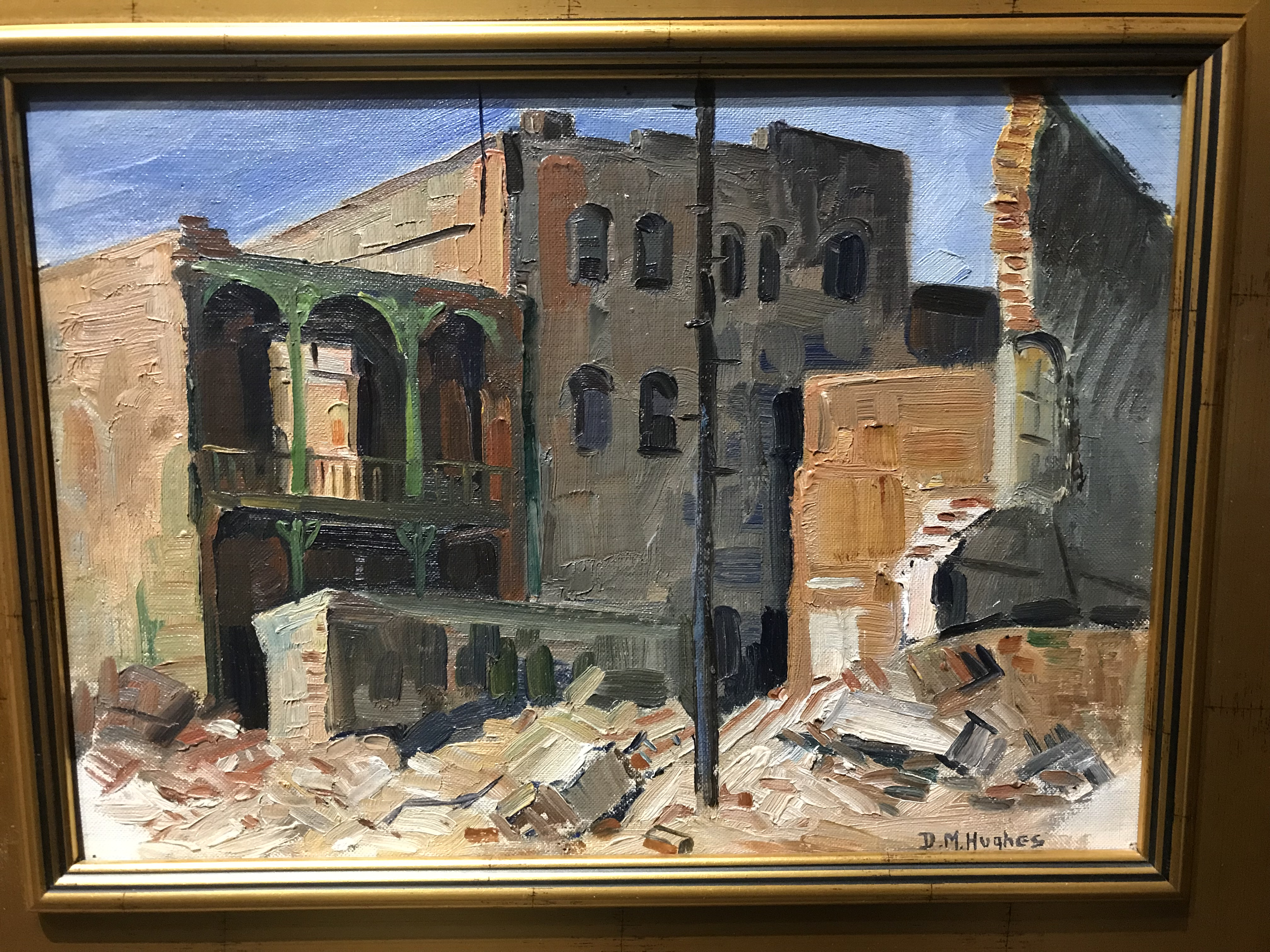
Wrecking Old Chinatown, Los Angeles, 1951, by Daisy M. Hughes.

Daisy Marguerite Hughes (1883–1968) was an American painter and lithographer.

== About ==
A native of Los Angeles, California and born in 1883. Hughes studied with George Elmer Browne, Ralph Johonnot, Louise Elizabeth Garden MacLeod, Rudolph Schaeffer, and Channel Pickering Townsley. Groups to which she belonged included the Allied Artists of America, the National Association of Women Painters and Sculptors, the American Federation of Arts, the California Art Club, the California Watercolor Society, and the Provincetown Art Association. She also studied at the Art Students League of New York for a time in the 1920s. She exhibited locally in Los Angeles and taught art in the public school system. A collection of her papers is in the Archives of American Art.

Her painting “Wrecking Old Chinatown” (1951) was featured in the exhibition, Something Revealed: California Women Artists Emerge, 1860-1960 at Pasadena Museum of History in 2019.
