= Winifred Smith (disambiguation) =

Winifred Smith (1858–1925) was an English botanist and educationist.

Winifred Smith may refer to:

- Winifred Smith (musician) (1911–2004), British organist
- Winifred Smith Rieber (1872–1963), American artist
