= Rudolph Schaeffer School of Design =

Former art school in San Francisco, California

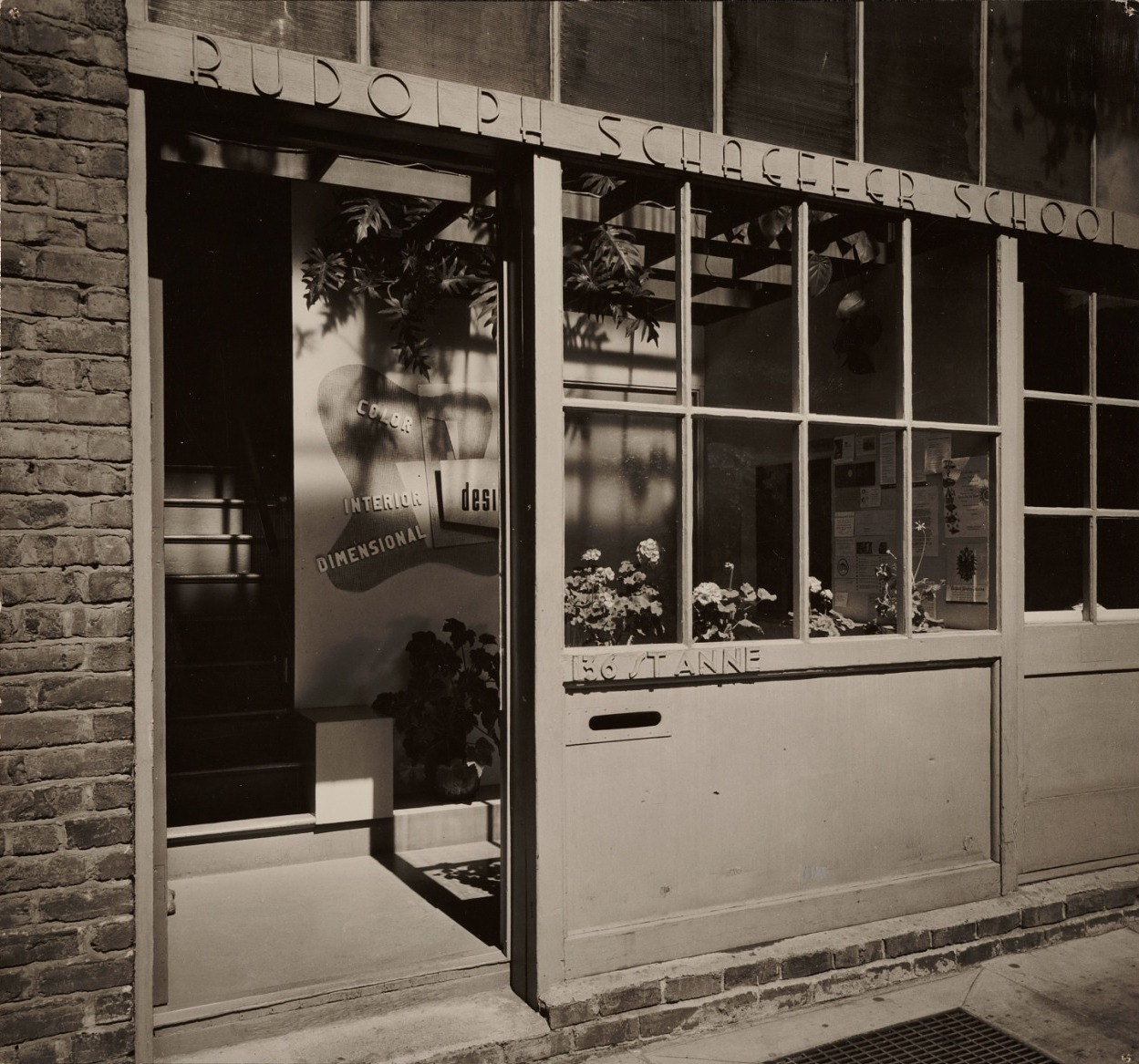
- Rudolph Schaeffer School front door (circa 1940), on 136 St. Anne Street

Location
- 2255 Mariposa Street; San Francisco, California; United States
- 37.763248°N 122.405970°W

Information
- Other name: Rudolph Schaeffer School of Rhythmo-Chromatic Design
- School type: private art school
- Established: 1924
- Founder: Rudolph Schaeffer
- Closed: 1984
- Language: English
- Campus type: urban

Rudolph Schaeffer School of Design or Rudolph Schaeffer School of Rhythmo-Chromatic Design (1924 – 1984) was an art school located in San Francisco, California, best known for its courses in color and interior design. The school was founded by artist Rudolph Schaeffer.

== History ==
The school founder, Rudolph Frederick Schaeffer had studied at the Academy of Fine Arts, Munich (1914 to 1915) through the United States Commission of Education, learn about the study of color, design, and craft and how it was being taught in public, industrial, and trade schools. He also studied color theory under Ralph Johonnot.

The Rudolph Schaeffer School of Design was an art school founded in 1924 in San Francisco, California. Originally named the Rudolph Schaeffer School of Rhythmo-Chromatic Design, located at 136 St. Anne Street with large front windows looking out on Saint Mary's Square and Beniamino Bufano's Sun Yat Sen statue, in the Chinatown neighborhood of San Francisco. Other artists had studios in the Anne Street building, including Bertha Lum and Frances Revett Wallace.

"St. Mary's Square sloped down from Sun Yat Sen and the poplar trees, a beautiful sloping park where the Chinese women and mothers used to bring their children and spread a blanket and have their lunch and sit there in the sun; our students used to go out and sit in the park and enjoy that park. Then the city came along and condemned the whole street, this little St. Anne Street running at the base of the park, and a parking lot for the Stauffer Chemical Company on the other side, and a small hotel at either end of St. Anne Street running from California to Pine."

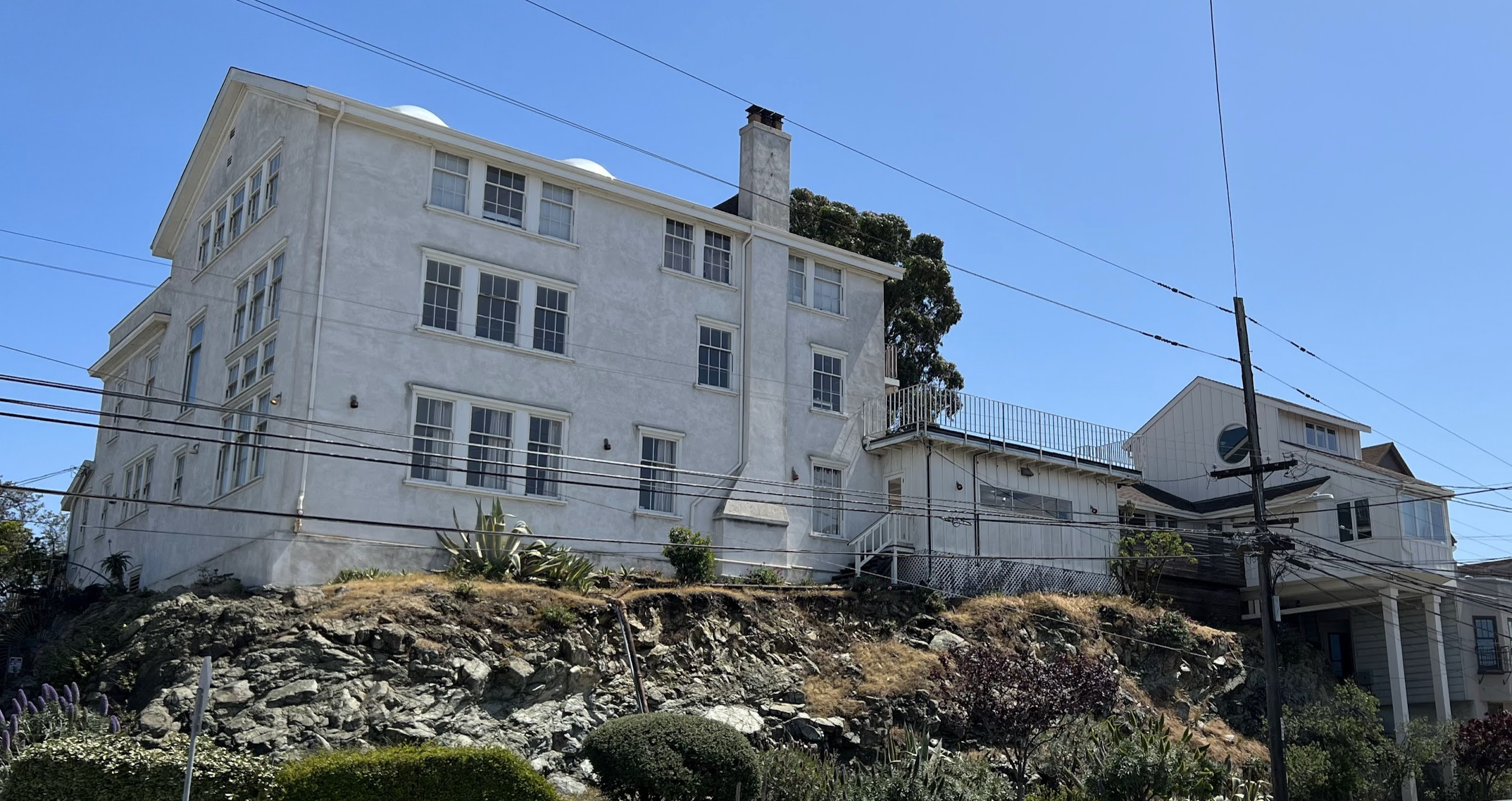
2255 Mariposa Street, the Potrero Hill campus from 1960–1984

In 1928, the school was at 127 Grant Avenue, near Union Square, San Francisco. In the 1950s, in order to educate the public and students about Asian culture, Schaeffer invited Dr. Haridas Chaudhuri, founder of California Institute of Integral Studies (CIIS) to give public lectures at his East-West Arts Gallery.

By 1960 the school moved to Potrero Hill at 2255 Mariposa Street. In 1984, the school closed after financial issues and disagreements in terms of direction of the school between Schaeffer and the Board of Trustees.

== Notable students ==
A list of notable alumni from Rudolph Schaeffer School of Design, in alphabetical order by last name.

- Dorr Bothwell (1902–2002), artist, designer and author of "Notan – on the Interaction of Positive and Negative Spaces"
- Ernest Briggs (1923–1984), abstract expressionist painter, and professor at Pratt Institute from 1961 to 1984
- Henry Doane (1905–1999), landscape painter and commercial artist
- Manny Farber (1917–2008), painter and writer
- Edward McNeil Farmer (1901–1969), painter and former professor at Stanford University.
- George Gaethke (1898–1982), WPA-era artist, painter, printmaker
- Dorothy Rieber Joralemon (1893–1987), sculptor
- Dorothy Wagner Puccinelli (1901–1974), WPA-era artist and muralist, enrolled in 1925
- Raymond Puccinelli (1904–1986), sculptor, former professor of sculpture
- Hazel Salmi (1893–1986), painter, arts administrator
- Lanette Scheeline (1910–2001) artist and textile designer
- Geraldine Knight Scott (1904–1989), landscape architect
- Michael Taylor (1927–1986), interior designer
- Louise Dahl-Wolfe (1895–1989), photographer - from Schaeffer's teachings at San Francisco Art Institute
