= Geraldine Knight Scott =

American landscape architect

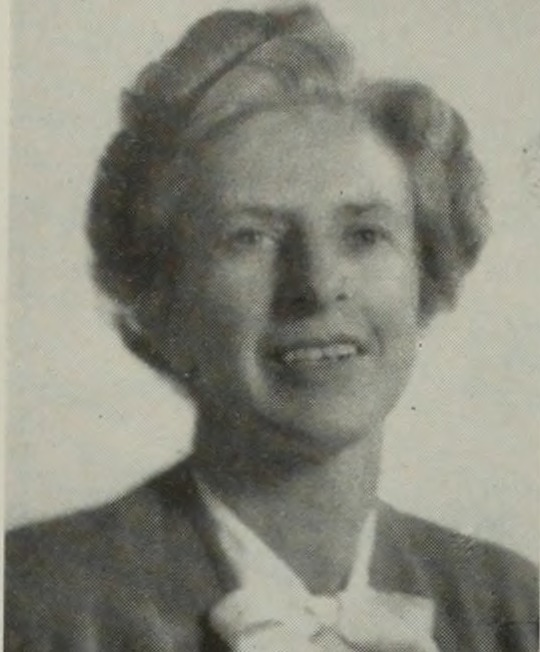
- Scott in 1947
- Born: July 16, 1904; Wallace, Idaho, U.S.
- Died: August 2, 1989 (aged 85); Berkeley, California, U.S.
- Education: University of California, Berkeley
- Occupation: Architect
- Awards: FASLA
- Projects: Golden Gate International Exposition; Oakland Museum of California

Geraldine "Gerry" Knight Scott (July 16, 1904 – August 2, 1989) was a California landscape architect. She taught landscape architecture at the University of California, Berkeley and was a Fellow of the American Society of Landscape Architects. She was a founding member of the California Horticultural Society and received various awards and honors.

== Education ==
Geraldine Knight was born in Wallace, Idaho. She moved to the San Francisco Bay Area to live with relatives after her parents died. She decided in high school to become a landscape architect and enrolled in UC Berkeley's College of Agriculture in 1922. She received a degree in Landscape Architecture in 1926. Disappointed by the heavy emphasis on science and lack of art and design that the Berkeley’s College of Agriculture provided, Scott attended art and architecture classes at Cornell University from 1926 to 1928.

== Career ==
In 1928, Scott began her professional career in Southern California in the office of A.E. Hanson. Over the next two years she worked on various residential gardens and estates including the Harold Lloyd Estate in Beverly Hills.

In 1930, Scott embarked on a tour of Europe. She spent nearly two years abroad surveying historic Italian villas through the Accademia delle Arti in Rome and visiting the famous gardens of France and Spain. She also attended the Sorbonne in Paris studying housing projects in Austria and Germany. Scott returned to California in 1932 and unable to find work due to the Great Depression, returned to UC Berkeley where she studied painting with Japanese artist Chiura Obata. In 1933, she joined Helen Van Pelt’s office in Marin County and took color theory classes with Rudolph Schaeffer at the Rudolph Schaeffer School of Design.

In 1939 she married Los Angeles journalist Mellier G. Scott, with whom she shared a strong interest in urban and regional planning issues. After a trip to view housing projects in Europe, they returned to Los Angeles and Scott became the director of the Citizens Housing Council to promote public housing. She also became the first female member of the Los Angeles Regional Planning Commission where she worked on recreational planning and war housing.

Both Scott and her husband became actively involved in Telesis, a group of designers and planners interested in the social impacts of architecture and landscape design that had formed in Northern California. They started a "Telesis South" group "to try to think through better ways of planning for the future." This group organized an exhibition to promote and demonstrate their ideas at the Los Angeles County Museum, as the San Francisco group had done at the San Francisco Museum of Art. In 1941 the Scotts moved to Berkeley, California where they participated in the San Francisco Telesis Group and served on the San Francisco Housing and Planning Commission. The involvement with Telesis and her wartime work inspired Geraldine to continue working in the public sector. “Going back to doing private work did not have very great appeal after that,” she said.

Scott opened a private landscape architecture practice in 1948, with a focus on site planning and integrating the existing landscape into the project. Her work included housing, schools, and office park landscapes, as well as private gardens. Her talent for visual combinations of plants and knowledge of California flora led landscape architect Daniel Urban Kiley to invite Scott to join his design team for the Oakland Museum of California garden as a horticultural consultant in 1963. Acting as the local landscape architect, Scott was in charge of plant selection and numerous other horticultural and construction related details. She and colleague Mai Arbegast helped to preserve, protect, and later restore the gardens after they had fallen into disrepair.

== Teaching ==
She began teaching part-time at UC Berkeley in the Department of Landscape Architecture in 1952. Her classes covered site planning, planting, and design, and integrated sculpture, painting, and dance as tools for seeing and feeling space before articulating it with trees and shrubs. She also emphasized the physical characteristics of plants – color, shape, size, and texture – as design tools. In 1962, the Landscape Architecture Department asked Scott to manage the newly acquired Blake Estate. She completed a long-range plan for the gardens in 1964 and developed them into an important field education resource.

Scott continued to teach and practice concurrently until her retirement in 1968.

== Legacy ==
Scott’s most notable projects include the Pacific House at the Golden Gate International Exposition (1939), the Daphne Funeral Home in San Francisco (1953), the Oakland Museum of California (1963), and Blake Garden (Kensington, California) (1964). Scott participated on many civic commissions and boards, including seven years on the Berkeley Civic Art Commission. She was a founding member of the California Horticultural Society (1935), joined the American Society of Landscape Architects (ASLA) in 1937, and was elected an ASLA Fellow in 1972. She served on the ASLA task force on women in landscape architecture from 1974–75, and in 1981 she was elected to distinguished membership of the Sigma Lambda Alpha honor society.

Scott made two substantial bequests to the Department of Landscape Architecture at UC Berkeley: a traveling fellowship program for students, and an endowment for research into the history of landscape architecture, including augmenting, cataloguing, and maintaining the landscape architecture archives in the documents collection, now the Environmental Design Archives, of the College of Environmental Design.

== Selected bibliography ==
- Bobrow, Claire Wrenn. Geraldine Knight Scott: Art and the Landscape Architect. University of California, Berkeley: Department of Landscape Architecture, 1993.
- Lowell, Waverly, Elizabeth Byrne, and Carrie L. McDade, ed. Landscape at Berkeley: The First 100 Years. Regents of the University of California and the College of Environmental Design, 2013.
- Lowell, Waverly B. Living Modern: A Biography of Greenwood Common. Richmond, CA: William Stout Publishers, c. 2009.
- Mozingo, Louise A. Pastoral Capitalism: A History of Suburban Corporate Landscapes, Cambridge, Mass.: MIT Press, 2011.
