= Dorothy Rieber Joralemon =

American sculptor (1893–1987)

Dorothe Rieber Joralemon
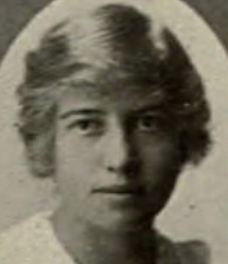
- Dorothy Rieber, from the 1915 yearbook of the University of California
- Born: Dorothy Rieber; March 19, 1893; San Francisco, California, U.S.
- Died: March 22, 1987; Berkeley, California, U.S.
- Education: University of California, Berkeley, Art Students League of New York, California College of Arts and Crafts, Rudolph Schaeffer School of Design
- Occupation(s): Artist, writer
- Known for: Children's portraits, abstract sculptor
- Spouse: Ira B. Joralemon (m. 1919–1975; death)
- Children: 2

Dorothy Rieber Joralemon (March 19, 1893 – March 22, 1987) was an American abstract sculptor, children's portrait artist and writer based in Northern California.

== Early life and education ==
Born in San Francisco as Dorothy Rieber, she was the daughter of Winifred Smith Rieber, a portrait painter, and Charles Henry Rieber, a professor of philosophy at the University of California, Berkeley. She played Joan of Arc in The Partheneia, a 1912 pageant on campus. She graduated Phi Beta Kappa from the same institution in 1915. After college, she spent time in France, as a Red Cross canteen worker during World War I.

Rieber next studied art at the Art Students League of New York and began her career as a children's portrait artist. In the 1930s, she discovered modern art and abstraction under the tutelage of Vaclav Vytlacil at the California College of Arts and Crafts. She also had art lessons with Worth Ryder and Rudolph Schaeffer, the latter at the Rudolph Schaeffer School of Design.

== Career ==
Joralemon showed work at exhibitions of the American Abstract Artists, and appeared at the Golden Gate International Exposition (GGIE), but by the 1950s she was forced to stop her art career due to problems with her eyesight. In the 1980s she wrote pieces for a number of magazines including American Heritage, American West and New Age Magazine. She was a member of the San Francisco Society of Women Artists.

== Personal life and legacy ==
In 1919, Rieber married Ira B. Joralemon, a geologist and mining engineer; they had known each other since childhood. They lived for many years in Berkeley, in a home at 168 Southampton Avenue designed by Bernard Maybeck. The couple had two children, a son Peter and a daughter Margaret. Her husband died in 1975, and she died in 1987, in Berkeley, at the age of 94.

Her artwork is found in various collections including that of the Mills College Art Museum.
