= George Michael Gaethke =

American visual artist (1898–1982)

- Born: July 31, 1898; Bathgate, North Dakota, United States
- Died: August 28, 1982 (aged 84); Mill Valley, California, United States
- Education: University of Montana, University of Washington, Rudolph Schaeffer School of Design, California School of Fine Arts, School of the Art Institute of Chicago
- Occupation: Visual artist
- Known for: Printmaker, watercolorist, painter
- Spouse: Vera Allison (m. 1919–1982; death)

George Michael Gaethke (July 31, 1898 – August 28, 1982) was an American printmaker, watercolorist, and painter. He worked for the Works Progress Administration in the 1930s, and was active in the San Francisco Bay Area.

== Early life and education ==
George Michael Gaethke was born on July 31, 1898, in Bathgate, North Dakota, United States. From a young age he was raised in Butte, Montana.

He attended the University of Montana, and the University of Washington. In 1924, Gaethke moved to San Francisco to continue his studies; where he studied under Rudolph Schaeffer at the Rudolph Schaeffer School of Design, and at the California School of Fine Arts (now San Francisco Art Institute). He briefly attended the School of the Art Institute of Chicago (SAIC).

In 1919, Gaethke married artist Vera Allison, and together they had one child.

== Career ==
In 1934, Gaethke assisted artist Maxine Albro in her mural at Coit Tower in Telegraph Hill; and he also worked for the Works Progress Administration (WPA) as a lithographer.

The San Francisco Museum of Art (now San Francisco Museum of Modern Art) printed Christmas cards in December 1942 for the gift shop featuring visual artists (both local and historically international), including Gaethke, Harold Mallette Dean, Herman Volz, Sargent Claude Johnson, Jacques Schnier, Tsuguharu Foujita, Jacques Callot, Giovanni Battista Tiepolo, and Diego Rivera. Gaethke and his wife Allison showed their artwork at Gump's in San Francisco in 1947.

In 1967, Gaethke and Allison moved to Mill Valley, California, where they remained until his death. He died on August 28, 1982, in Mill Valley.

Gaethke's work can be found in museum collections including at the Smithsonian American Art Museum, the National Gallery of Art, the Philadelphia Museum of Art, Metropolitan Museum of Art, and the Fine Arts Museums of San Francisco.
