= Seldon Williams House =

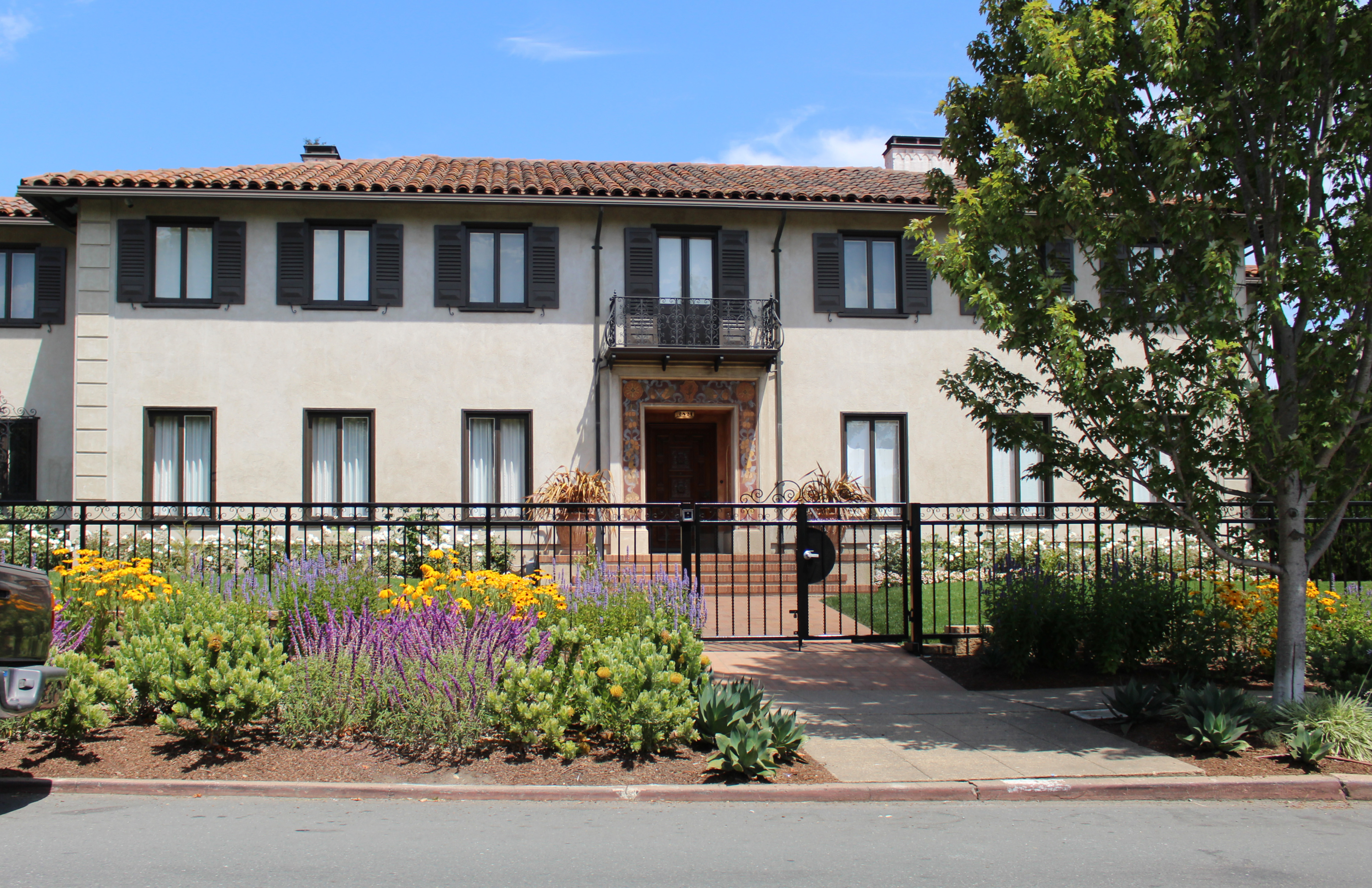

General information
- Architectural style: Spanish Colonial Revival; Mediterranean Revival
- Location: 2821 Claremont Blvd; Berkeley, California
- Coordinates: 37°51′36″N 122°14′43″W
- Completed: 1928

Technical details
- Floor area: 6,400-square-foot (590 m^{2})

Design and construction
- Architect: Julia Morgan

The Seldon Williams House is the official residence of the President of the University of California, located in the Claremont neighborhood of Berkeley, in the San Francisco Bay Area of Northern California. It was designed by noted architect Julia Morgan and completed in 1928 for Seldon and Elizabeth (nee Glide) Williams; after Seldon's death, Elizabeth lived alone in the house until 1970, when it was sold to the University of California to serve as the official residence of its Vice President. The house is named for its first owner, sometimes spelled as Selden instead; it also is known as the Julia Morgan House for its architect. UC sold the house to a private owner in 1991 and repurchased it in 2022, this time to serve as the UC President's house, succeeding Blake House in Kensington, which has not been used as the presidential residence since 2008 due to the cost of remedying seismic deficiencies and deferred maintenance.

== History ==
=== Williams ===
Seldon Roane Williams and Elizabeth Glide were married on April 24, 1913 at her mother's apartments in Cloyne Court Hotel. Glide came from a prominent Sacramento family, while Williams was originally from Lebanon, Tennessee; the society news article announcing their wedding stated "he will make a home for his bride after the conclusion of their honeymoon." The home at 2821 Claremont Boulevard was designed by Julia Morgan for the Williams. Elizabeth was one of the daughters of wealthy philanthropist Lizzie Glide (founder of Mary Elizabeth Inn and namesake of Glide Memorial Church), and this house was one of several commissions undertaken by Morgan for the Glide family. Morgan's nephew Morgan North had a contract to photograph the house once a week during its construction. Although the house was designed for the Williams couple to entertain guests, Seldon Williams died soon after the house was complete and Elizabeth lived a reclusive life upstairs, closing most of the house and covering the furniture. In the upstairs primary suite where Williams lived, she used the fireplace for heat and sometimes forgot to open the flue; as Norma Willer later recalled, "I don't know what she burned but [...] it was a dark cave [when we inspected it for the University in 1971]." During World War II, Catherine Freeman Nimitz, wife of Chester Nimitz, was living in the Claremont neighborhood; she overheard that an agent of the Federal Bureau of Investigation arrested the butler and maid as German agents.

According to Mary Grace Barron, a Claremont neighborhood resident and the real estate agent who would later handle its sale, "it was the 'dream house' of many [passersby] who speculated about its mysterious owner." Barron and her husband had stopped by the Morgan-designed Hearst residence at San Simeon while returning from a trip to San Diego over the Labor Day weekend in 1970 and upon passing by the home at 2821 Claremont, she told him "Gilbert, that's the best Julia Morgan there is. It's better than anything at San Simeon." She later learned from Morgan's nephew that Julia considered it one of her best works.

Shortly before Elizabeth Williams died in 1970, she agreed to sell it and the Italian furnishings to the University of California. Barron first enquired if Williams would donate it to the city of Berkeley's Civic Art Foundation along with an endowment to pay for its upkeep, suggesting that as she was a real estate agent, she would be happy to sell the house instead. Williams, who had fallen and broken her hip, had delegated her legal affairs to her nephew, Joseph Henry Glide, Jr., who told Barron that Williams had donated the house to the Christian Jews in her will; Glide later agreed to list the property with Barron. After approximately six weeks of cleaning and repainting the upstairs bedroom where Williams had been living, the house was listed for US$125,000 (equivalent to $1,040,000 in 2025); Barron later recounted "it was a Julia Morgan and truly a beauty. But also considering that there were cracks, an antique kitchen, an almost unusable narrow driveway, a steam boiler that had to be replaced, the price was as high as could be."

=== University of California ===
Barron solicited interest from groups that might have been interested in historical preservation, including the Berkeley Civic Art Commission, the local chapter of the American Institute of Architects (AIA), and professor emeritus Michael Goodman, a former colleague of Morgan. Shortly afterward, Barron was contacted by Kirk Rowlands, assistant to the President of the University of California (UC). According to Rowlands, who also was a Claremont resident that had long admired the home, the rector of St. Clement's Episcopal Church pulled him aside after a Sunday service in September 1970 to inform him that Barron had an exclusive listing on the property and suggested that UC may be interested. As it turned out, UC was seeking an official residence for its vice president, Chester O. McCorkle, who had been living in a leased house since March 1970. Rowlands arranged for a tour of the house with Richard Hartsook, UC's real estate officer, and Robert Evans, the UC architect; Evans did not make any written notes during the walkthrough but told Rowlands as they were leaving "That is a distinguished house", expressing admiration for the decorations and scale.

Barron called Rowlands on October 26, urging him to purchase the house, as Williams health was failing. Rowlands was authorized by UC President Charles Hitch to put up US$1,000 to secure a 90-day option to purchase the property, which Hitch preferred calling the Julia Morgan House. UC placed an offer of US$100,000 (equivalent to $830,000 in 2025) using funds raised from private donors. Williams accepted the offer on October 27 and died the next morning. The Regents of the University of California agreed to purchase the house on January 22, 1971. UC would use the home as the Vice President's residence and for official functions until 1991. The cost of purchasing and remodeling the Williams home was criticized by Pete Stark in February 1971, who decried the "hypocrisy of a university system which pleads that it can't afford to help minority youth get a higher education while at the same time it buys plush mansions for its rank-and-file administrators."

=== Private Residents ===
In 1991, Turner and Elizabeth Kibby purchased the house from UC, having lost their previous home, designed by William Wurster, in the 1991 Oakland Hills fire. Turner Kibby described their role as stewards: "No one can 'own' a house like this. This is really a public trust. It is our duty to take care of it for those that come after us"; they made minor updates to ensure the house would be livable but did not undertake drastic renovations. With their three sons grown, the Kibbys listed the house for sale in 2003 at nearly US$4 million. Don and Carol Anne Brown purchased the home from the Kibbys in 2004 and relocated from Sacramento to Berkeley in early 2005. The Berkeley Architectural Heritage Association gave a preservation award to the Browns in 2011 for their restoration of the home, including conservation of the original interior and exterior frescos by Maxine Albro, declaring "the house has come to life, opening its doors to a constant stream of guests, realizing the gracious potential for which it was originally designed by Julia Morgan."

In 2022, UC repurchased the house in Berkeley for $6.5 million, to serve as the UC president's official residence.

== Design ==
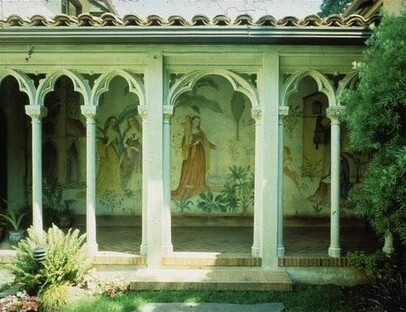
Frescoes by Maxine Albro.

The house at 2821 Claremont was designed contemporaneously with the Hearst residence at San Simeon. According to the AIA nomination for the Gold Medal awarded to Morgan in 2014, it is "one of Julia Morgan's finest [Renaissance] Period Revival residences ... [displaying] Morgan's skill at incorporating authentic period details carried out with the highest level of craftsmanship to achieve the desired historic effect for her clients. ... Upon entering the Seldon Williams House, visitors are overwhelmed by the beauty, elegance, and warmth this residence radiates." The street facade is symmetric, featuring seven shuttered windows on the second floor; the central window has a wrought-iron balcony above the main door. The house was designed for entertaining, with a large entrance hall and a layout facilitating the circulation of guests in a loop through the main rooms, in contrast to the UC President's residence at the time, Blake House, which had to be modified for that purpose. As Sara Boutelle, Morgan's biographer, writes, "when the heavy front door opens, it seems to invite a procession: the spacious living hall ... leads the eye up to a landing, where a great window with Gothic tracery ... looks out on a garden courtyard. ... Ornament is pervasive [and] the circulation in this building makes it convenient for moving and serving large crowds".

The frescoes at the entrance and courtyard were painted by Maxine Albro. There is a ceramic wreath by Andrea della Robbia in the entrance hall, which had been purchased for the house by Julia Morgan in Italy.

After it was purchased by UC in 1971, Norma Willer supervised the renovations to update the kitchen appliances and layout, which was the sole major update to the interior. An acoustic ceiling was added in the study and dining room; according to Willer, "the din just becomes deafening" with crowds talking. UC also added a wine cellar and replaced the furnace, but the space for the wine cellar already existed.

== See also ==
- Blake House
- University House, Berkeley
- List of works by Julia Morgan
