= Michael Taylor (designer) =

American designer (1927-1986)

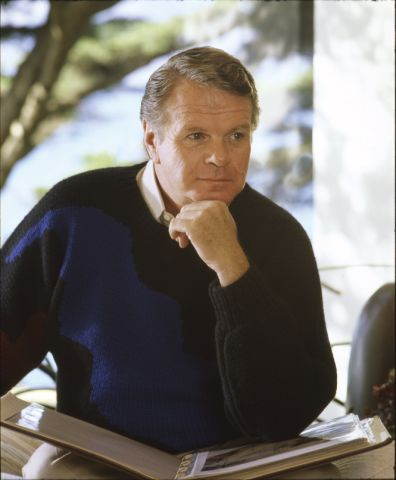
- Born: Earnest Charles Taylor; January 30, 1927; Modesto, California, U.S.
- Died: June 3, 1986 (aged 59); San Francisco, California, U.S.
- Occupation: Designer
- Website: Michael Taylor Designs

Michael Taylor (born Earnest Charles Taylor, January 30, 1927 – June 3, 1986) was an American designer best known for creating the "California Look" of interior design. One of Architectural Digest's "20 Greatest Designers of All Time” and "Interior Design Legends". Taylor was noted for his rooms of airiness and light with a prominent use of natural forms and the color white. In 1956, he founded his design company, Michael Taylor Interiors, Inc. Under Michael Taylor Designs, he manufactured his own designs and in 1985 partnered with Paul Weaver to develop and market interior and exterior furnishings to the wholesale design trade. Taylor worked continuously until his death in 1986.

== Early life ==
=== Childhood ===
Born in Modesto, California in 1927, Michael Taylor moved with his family to the northern California town of Santa Rosa in 1933. There, his childhood was greatly influenced by his maternal grandmother who imparted on him an affinity for natural forms by taking him on daily hikes. It was here that the seeds of Taylor’s design philosophy were first planted, with his interest in the arts shining through even at a young age. Where other young boys collected baseball cards, the young Taylor collected bits of porcelain. However, despite an obvious penchant for aesthetics, his parents wished him to become a doctor. A dream they held onto for years and that he nearly lived out.

=== Formative years ===
In 1944, Taylor dropped out of High School, where he played football and was active in theater, to join the U.S. Navy. He served as a Navy paramedic until he was discharged in 1946. That experience, however, soured Taylor on the idea of becoming a doctor. Instead, he moved to San Francisco where, in 1947, he enrolled at the Rudolf Schaeffer School of Design. It was there that Taylor learned what he called "the secrets of color." Over time, he became very close to Mr. Schaeffer, who referred to him as “his dear Michael,” and who set him up as a partner in a fledgling design company with Frances Mihailoff, a prominent designer in San Francisco at the time. A mere four years after entering the Rudolf Schaeffer School of Design, Michael Taylor was already a partner in an interior design business at the age of 25. Their partnership was so fruitful that they both decided they could make it on their own. In 1956, Michael Taylor began his own interior design company.

== Career ==
=== Michael Taylor Interiors ===
After dissolving his partnership with Frances Mihailoff, Taylor set up Michael Taylor Interiors, Inc. on Sutter Street in San Francisco in 1956. Working for prominent San Francisco families, Taylor's reputation grew quickly. What was, at first, a clientele of San Francisco Bay Area socialites soon expanded to Los Angeles, Miami and New York. International acclaim followed and Taylor soon started working abroad as well.

=== Michael Taylor Designs Inc. ===
In 1985 Paul Weaver, former Director of Marketing and VP of McGuire Furniture, approached Taylor with a plan to develop and expand the nascent Michael Taylor Designs product line offered by Taylor's interiors company into a new entity. Michael Taylor Designs Inc. was officially incorporated on August 5, 1985. After Taylor's death in 1986 Weaver assumed full control and over the subsequent 24 years greatly expanded the product lines, established nationwide sales showrooms and developed the Taylor brand into one of the most recognized luxury products in the home furnishing industry.

=== Design Philosophy ===
Taylor's distinct "California Look" begins as an amalgamation of different styles, mixed with his own unique twists and has been called "a posthumous collaboration with some of the great decorators of the past." Starting with Syrie Maugham's emphasis on shades of white, adding in the ornateness of Sister Parish and the simple exquisiteness of Frances Elkins' design; Taylor would then infuse his own style. A look born in the past yet completely new.

Implicit in that design philosophy was a melding of styles and ages. A set of antique Italian chairs beside a Roy Lichtenstein print; Chinese chairs set around an unvarnished wood table atop a Yosemite granite base. He stated, "there is no arbitrary law which says that an eighteenth-century French chair and a Sheridan can't be used in the same room. The only consideration is how well these or other pieces look together; do they compete with each other or do they create a felicitous sense of contrast?" And while this fusion seems commonplace now, it was largely unheard of before Michael Taylor.

An important piece of the Taylor design aesthetic was to bring the outdoors in, adding natural forms into ornate rooms. Plants were a must and he'd often use large, unshaped boulders indoors. His childhood in northern California, spending much time outdoors, fed his desire for nature infused rooms. But this also served a practical design purpose, as he said, "Plants have a way of preventing a room from appearing overdecorated; they also soften light." And the effect of light on a room drove many of his design decisions.

Although noted for his extensive use of the color white, Taylor didn't use white as the centerpiece for the room but rather to bring out the lighting and other aspects in the room. Michael Taylor White, his own hue (warmer than plain white), worked to promote the other colors, a source of light and/or a piece of art. White also served to bring light into the room, making it warmer. Taylor would often spend an entire day in a room before designing it. Watching the way the light worked through the room at different points of the day. Only then, when he had a grasp of the light patterns, would he begin to design.

Simplicity was vital to Taylor's style. His famous saying, "When in doubt, throw it out," was a design mantra of sorts. As he stated, "If (a room) is properly put together, it is often more refreshing to have a wall with nothing hanging on it." However, with a simplified design palette the room risked becoming too sparse and this is where Taylor says his use of scale came into play, "When you take things out, you must increase the size of what's left." And so Taylor's famed voluminous sofas and chairs came about.

Finally, and perhaps most radically, Taylor insisted that a room never look perfectly finished. As he wrote in his 1964 essay, "A New Look at Decorating":

The most beautiful rooms are those that retain a feeling of not being quite finished. There is still a place for a painting on that wall, still a chair to be found that will suit that corner...meanwhile the room stays alive, young and growing...(A room) should not be 'too perfect.' Perfection in every detail usually makes a room look studied, formal, rather dull, and even forbidding.

== Legacy ==
To this day, Taylor's work informs the design world. Despite passing away more than two decades ago, Taylor has been repeatedly featured in Architectural Digest, most recently in the January 2010 issue. The February 2010 issue of San Francisco magazine's cover feature on up and coming interior designers declared Taylor "the emperor of California Design," and something of a fountainhead for the movement. The next month the San Francisco Chronicle referred to his design of Fleur de Lys restaurant as the "most romantic" in San Francisco.

Famed designer, and one of Architectural Digest's "AD100" (their list of the 100 top international architects and interior designers), Suzanne Tucker was Taylor's protégé. In a 2007 interview, Tucker said, "Michael Taylor was undoubtedly my strongest philosophical influence in that he really demonstrated that design can be a mix of eras and styles, color and form, but the most essential aspect is always scale and proportion."
After Taylor's death in 1986, Tucker together with partner, Timothy F. Marks, bought his interior design business, Michael Taylor Interiors, Inc. which has since become Tucker & Marks, Inc. Paul Weaver acquired 100% of the shares in the furniture company, Michael Taylor Designs, in 1986 and operated it until its sale in 2009. Michael Taylor Designs continues to operate showrooms in San Francisco, Los Angeles, Chicago, Miami and New York.
