= Blake Garden (Kensington, California) =

Public garden in California, United States

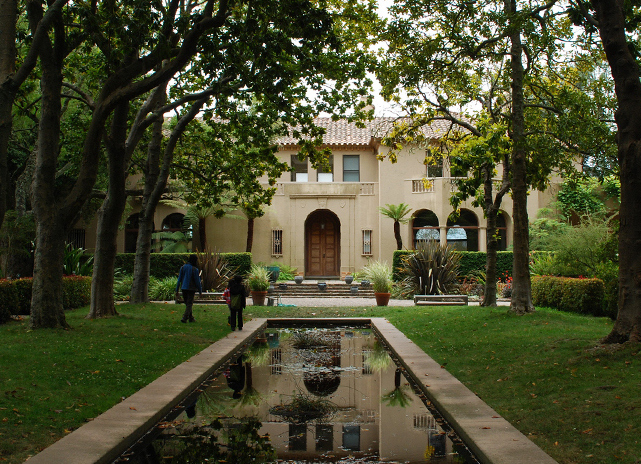
- Formal Garden with reflecting pool and Blake House in Blake Garden

- Location within California Location within the United States
- Type: Public
- Location: 70 Rincon Road; Kensington, California, United States
- Coordinates: 37°54′48″N 122°17′07″W
- Area: 10.6 acres (4.3 ha)
- Created: 1957 by
- Status: Open year round
- Website: ced.berkeley.edu/about-ced/our-spaces/blake-garden

Blake Garden is a teaching facility for the UC Berkeley College of Environmental Design in the hills of Kensington, California, in the East Bay region of the Bay Area in Northern California, approximately 4 mi (6.4 km) north of the main University of California, Berkeley campus. It was originally designed by landscape architect Mabel Symmes for the estate owned by her sister and brother-in-law, Anita and Anson Blake; the trio lived in Blake House, a mansion on the estate designed by architect Walter Danforth Bliss and completed in 1924. The Blakes deeded the grounds to their alma mater, the University of California, in 1957, which took full control after Anita's death in 1962, implementing a redesign by Geraldine Knight Scott starting from 1964. Blake House served as the official residence of the President of the University of California from 1967 to 2008. Since 2009, Blake Garden has been open to the public on weekdays.

== History ==
=== Blake family ===
In Berkeley (before Kensington).

One of the original trustees of the University of California, Anson Gale Stiles, purchased land on Piedmont Avenue, east of the present-day Berkeley campus in the late 1860s. Anson's Piedmont house was completed in 1895. Anson ultimately left the property to his daughter, Harriet Waters Stiles (1840–1928). Additionally, two of Harriet's sons, Anson Stiles Blake (1870–1959) and Edwin Tyler Blake (1875–1949), would later build homes and gardens on this same property.

In Kensington.

When the Stiles/Blake family land on Piedmont was later purchased by the university in 1922 to build Memorial Stadium, the families relocated to a 45-acre (18 ha) site in Kensington, encompassing where Blake Garden is today. The site was owned by Harriet who divided the land evenly between her four children: Eliza; Robert; Edwin; and Anson.

Two of those children - Eliza Seely Blake Thatcher (1872–1944), and Robert Pierpont Blake (1886–1950) - lived outside the Bay Area and sold their shares to developers.

The two other siblings, Anson and Edwin Blake, built two homes on the property in the Kensington hills. Anson Blake's house was completed in 1925, and is also known as La Casa Adelante. Edwin Blake's house is also known as Quinta de La Lilas.

The widowed Harriet would live with Edwin, while Anson's sister-in-law, Mabel Symmes (1875–1962), would live with Anson and Anita (1872–1962), his wife and Mabel's sister. Anita and Mabel transplanted much of the Piedmont garden to the new Kensington site, taking four months and thirty truckloads to do so.

Anson Blake's house is now Blake Garden (see below). Over the next thirty years, the Symmes sisters would continue to collect botanical specimens and develop the site. A small colony of semi-feral cats kept the rodent population from eating the plants. From the start, the Blakes invited students from the Department of Landscape Architecture at the University of California to the estate.

Edwin Blake's house is now a Carmelite Monastery, which is adjacent to Blake Garden.

=== University of California ===
The garden was deeded to the University of California in 1957 by Anson and Anita Blake, and Mai Arbegast was appointed acting director of Blake Garden, working closely with the family to identify and catalog the plant species that had been collected. Title on the site passed to the university upon the deaths of Anita Blake and her sister Mabel Symmes in 1962. Geraldine Knight Scott was appointed director of Blake Garden and began preparing the site for public visitation by clearing overgrown foliage and creating an influential Long Range Development Plan in 1964. For a "brief and unsatisfactory" time from 1962 to 1964, it was used as a women's graduate student dormitory. The remote location proved to be frightening at night and too distant, at approximately 4 mi (6.4 km) north of the Berkeley campus.

The President of the University of California had traditionally lived in President's House, a residence on the Berkeley campus; when Clark Kerr was promoted from the Chancellor of Berkeley to UC president, he continued to live in his own private residence, and had President's House remodeled into University House to hold official events. University House would become the Berkeley chancellor's residence in 1965, when Roger W. Heyns moved into the house. In 1967, Charles Hitch succeeded Kerr as UC president and selected Blake House as his residence; it would continue to serve as the residence for the University of California president from 1967 to 2008. Hitch moved into the residence in April 1969, following a US$459,000 (equivalent to $4,030,000 in 2025) refurbishment paid through private donations. Improvements were designed by the architects Ron and Myra Brocchini, and upgrades to the grounds were designed by Scott to increase security and privacy while maintaining public access, including the stucco wall and fencing east of Blake House. Hitch also paid a "posessory interest" tax equivalent to a property tax directly to Contra Costa County from his own pocket.

Russell Beatty succeeded Scott as the director of Blake Garden in 1967, implementing a new mission as an "outdoor laboratory" for student projects in landscape architecture. In addition, the Children's Adventure Garden and Playground was built in 1970, spearheaded by Walter Doty, and ran for three years, with children responsible for tending plants under the guidance of Berkeley students. Under Beatty, the Cut-Flower Garden was created in 1973 and a bouquet was delivered daily to the House.

Hitch's successor as UC President, David S. Saxon, lived in Blake House from 1975 to 1983. In 1983, the University of California helped incoming President David P. Gardner purchase a different home in Orinda, as Blake House was configured with only two bedrooms at the time and Gardner wanted more privacy. Nevertheless, Gardner used Blake House for official events and as an off-campus presidential office. In 2002, an inspection revealed cracks and water damage; Robert Dynes called it "pretty much unlivable" with a leaky roof, mold, and broken fixtures. Mark Yudof broke from tradition when he became UC President in 2008; as part of his vow to bring fiscal responsibility to the system, he chose to live in a rented house instead of spending the estimated US$10 million in renovations and refurbishment for Blake House, although a few events continued to be held at Blake House. The chair of the Regents of the University of California, Russell Gould, described the mansion as having "great bones, but it is a money pit." In 2013, incoming UC president Janet Napolitano rented a house in Oakland as her presidential residence; at the time, Blake House was called "stately, but run-down" and it was estimated that required renovations could cost up to US$6 million, compared to the US$100,000 annual cost of renting a suitable house.

The Seldon Williams House, a historic residence at 2821 Clairemont Blvd, designed by Julia Morgan and completed in 1928, was purchased for the UC president in 2021; according to a news release describing that acquisition, "UC's former official presidential residence, Blake House in Kensington, has been uninhabitable for more than a decade because of extensive — and cost-prohibitive — deferred maintenance, in addition to significant seismic risks and landslide hazards. The university plans to sell this property at an appropriate time, with proceeds going to UC Berkeley's College of Environmental Design." The upper garden is crossed by the Hayward Fault, which runs through Kensington parallel to Arlington Avenue, and the site is part of an area considered "highly susceptible to movement" as a potential site of a future major earthquake.

== Design ==
=== Blake House and Formal Garden ===
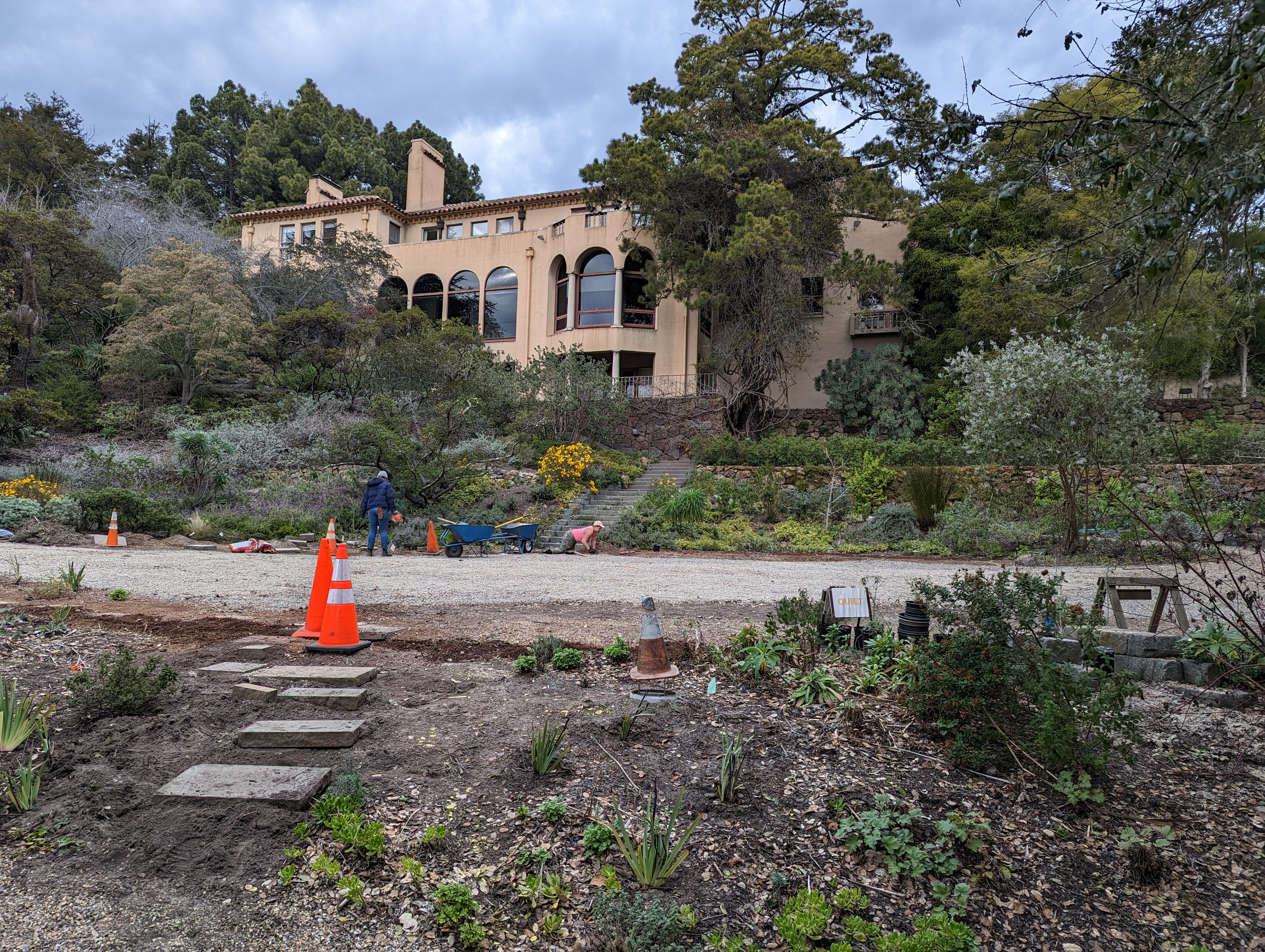
Western facade of Blake House, from the Lower Lawn

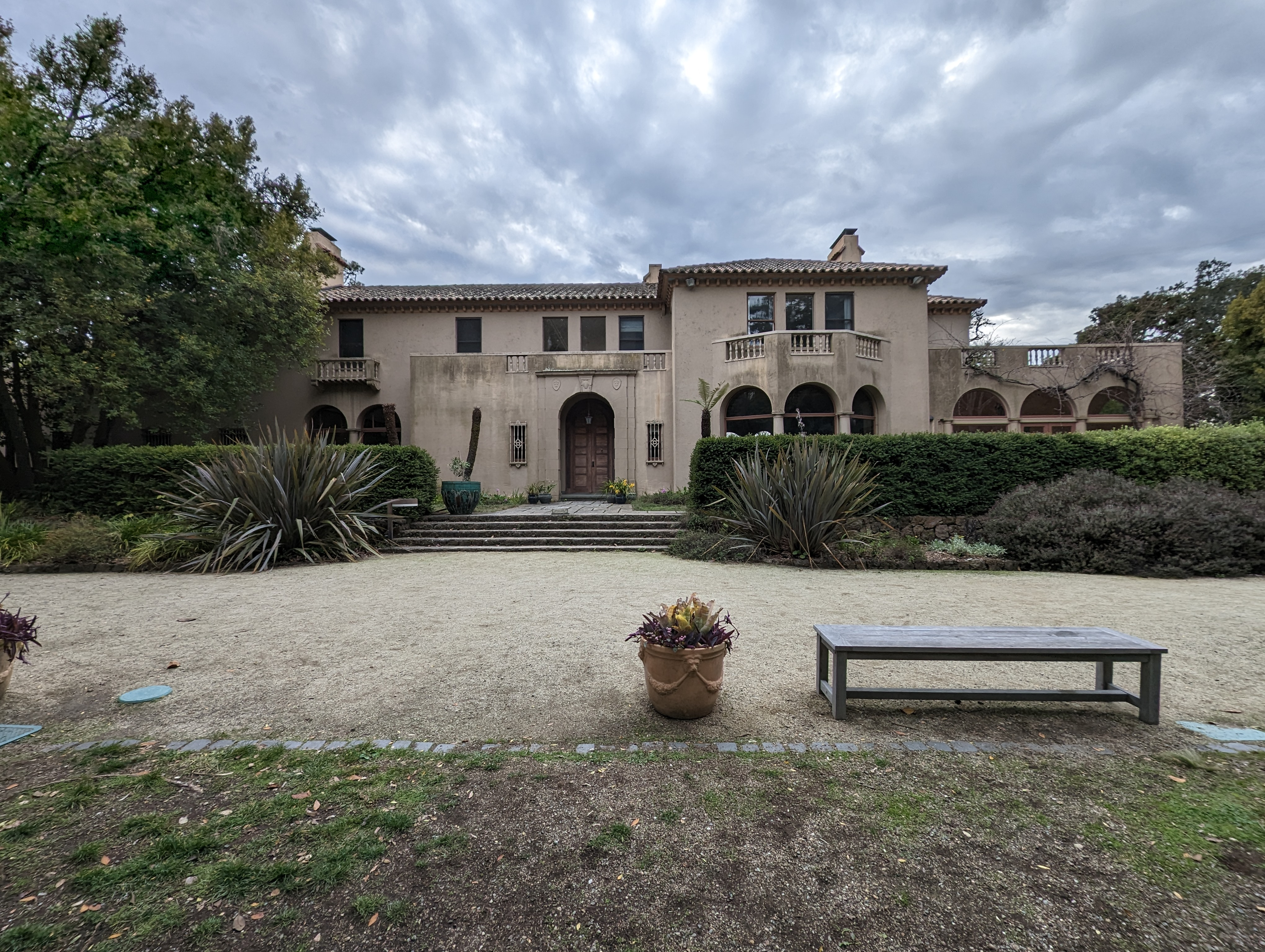
Eastern facade of Blake House

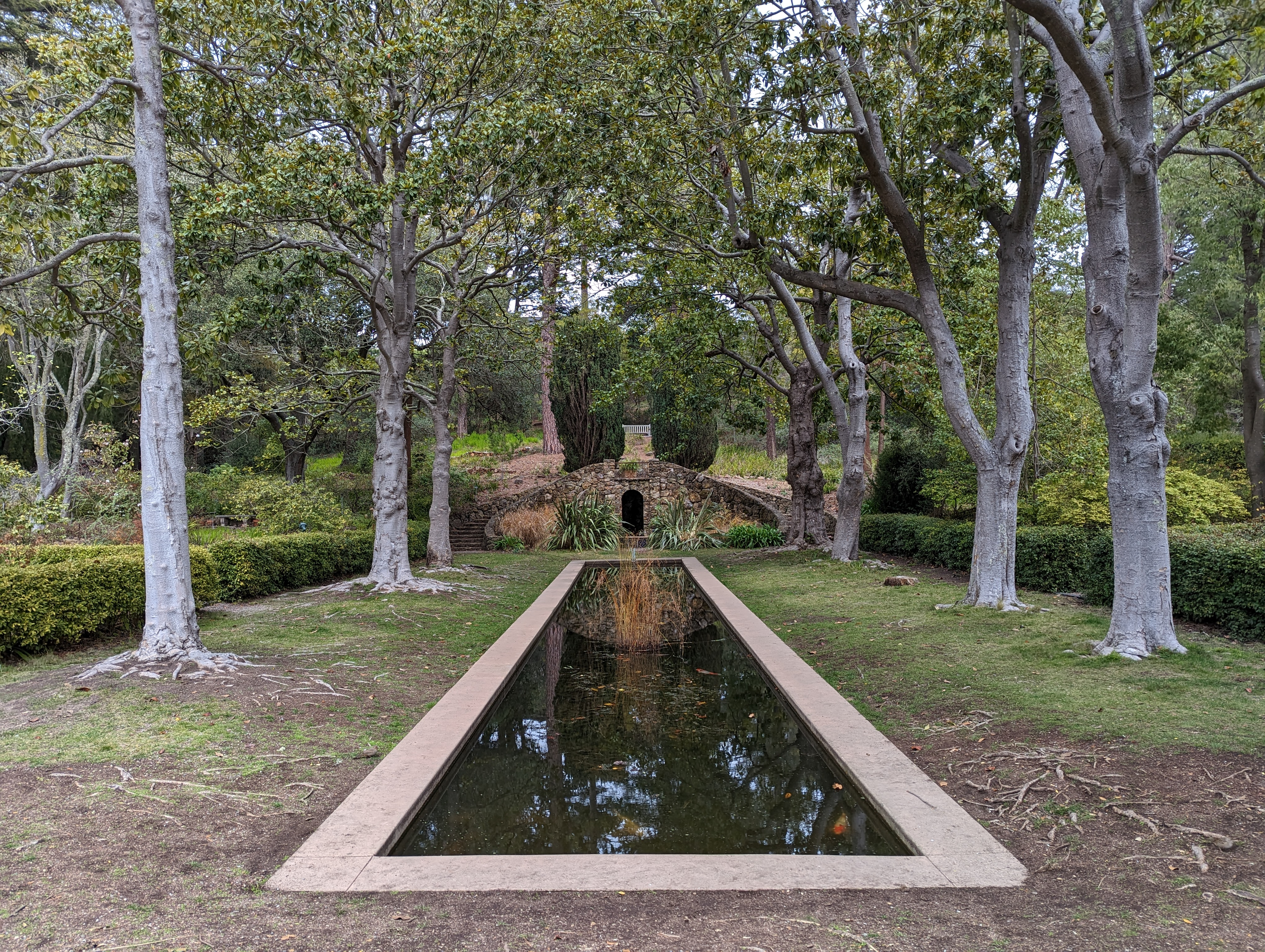
Formal Garden and grotto with reflecting pool, east of Blake House

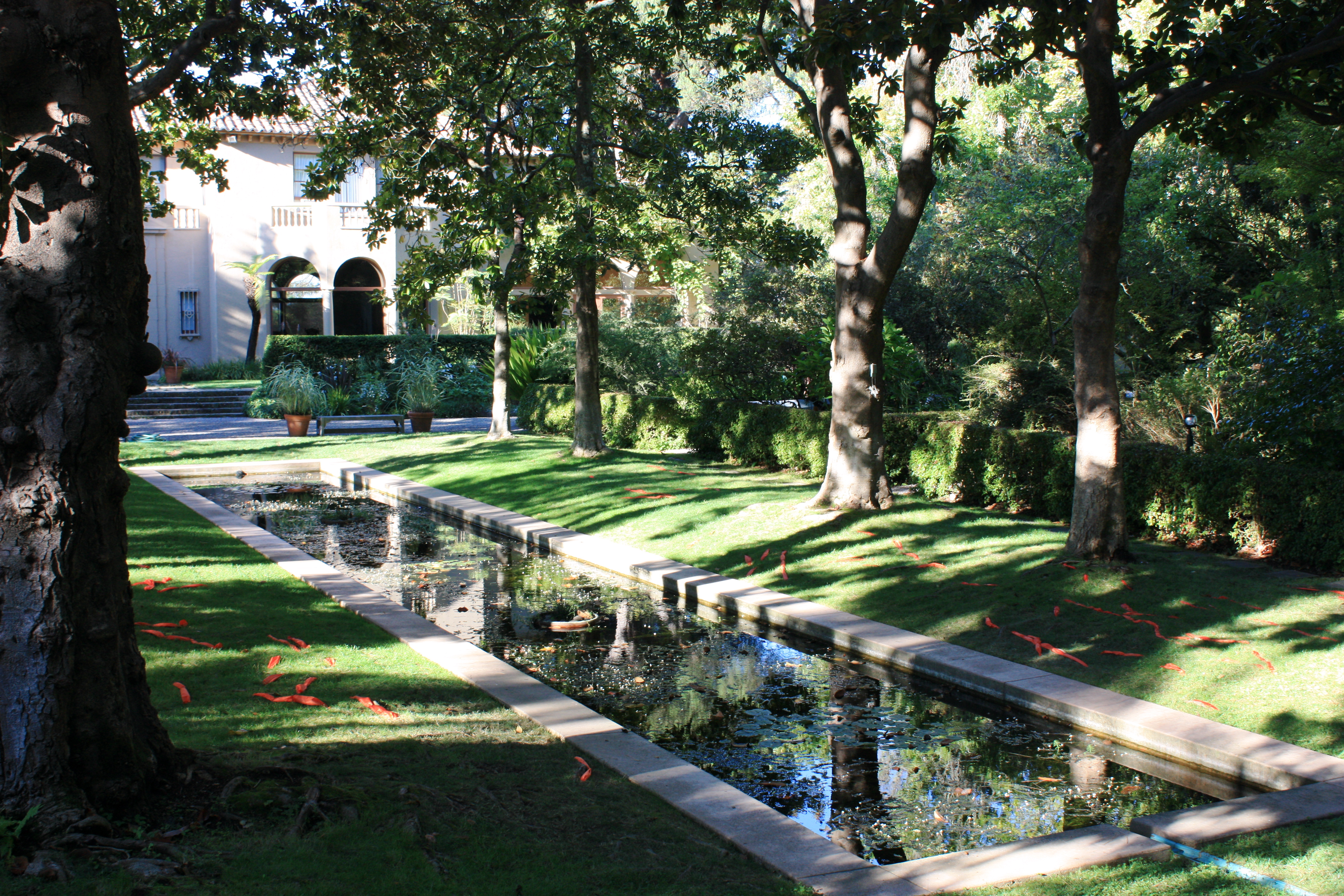
Eastern facade and reflecting pool with magnolia trees

Blake House was a 27-room mansion designed in a Spanish style by Walter Danforth Bliss for Anson Blake and his wife Anita. Hitch called it "the biggest three-bedroom house in the world", as the first floor was used for formal receptions and official functions, while residential spaces were limited to the second floor. The 1967–68 remodel as the UC Presidential house left the building with 12,434 ft^{2} (1,155.2 m^{2}) of floor space, seven bathrooms, two kitchens, and three bedrooms. Blake Garden occupies a site with grades of up to 50%; the land east of Blake House, sited on the upper third, is relatively flat, while the land west of the House is much steeper. The grounds are divided into five "garden rooms": the Formal Garden east of the House; Redwood Canyon to the north of the House; the areas West of the House, including the Lower Lawn and Mediterranean Section; Australian Hollow south of the House, and the Cut-Flower Garden east of Australian Hollow, including a vegetable garden, the Cottage Garden, the Square Garden, greenhouses, and tool sheds used by the Blake Garden staff. In addition, there is an entrance area that connects the House with Rincon Road to the east.

Selected locations in and near Tilden Regional Park
- Points of interest
- Nearby parks and museums
1 Tilden Little Farm
2 Tilden Park Merry-Go-Round
3 Inspiration Point
4 Lake Anza
5 Brazilian Room
6 Regional Parks Botanic Garden
7 Tilden Park Golf Course
8 Redwood Valley Railway
9 Blake Garden
10 Indian Rock Park
11 Berkeley Rose Garden
12 Lawrence Hall of Science
13 San Pablo Reservoir

The siting of Blake House is integral to the garden's design: it shelters the Formal Garden from the strong prevailing winds off the Golden Gate. The grounds for both estates were designed by Mrs. Blake's sister, Mabel Symmes, who graduated from the university's Landscape Architecture Department in 1914. Ms. Symmes' original plan showed great sensitivity to the site. Much of her original plan can still be seen in the design of the Formal Gardens east of the house, with its grotto, inspired by the Villa Tusculana at Frascati, Italy and the reflecting pool which was part of a system to take advantage of underground water. The koi that live in the pool are named for Blake family members.

The garden is home to nearly 1500 plant species, over fifty bird species, as well as raccoons, frogs, salamanders, and the occasional fox. The garden is all organic, with many sustainable practices including four kinds of composting, rainwater harvesting, and hives of honeybees. Decorations in the Garden include several sculptures with Asian themes, such as the glazed pagoda, which were purchased and installed originally by Anita Blake.

=== Outdoor garden rooms in Blake Garden ===
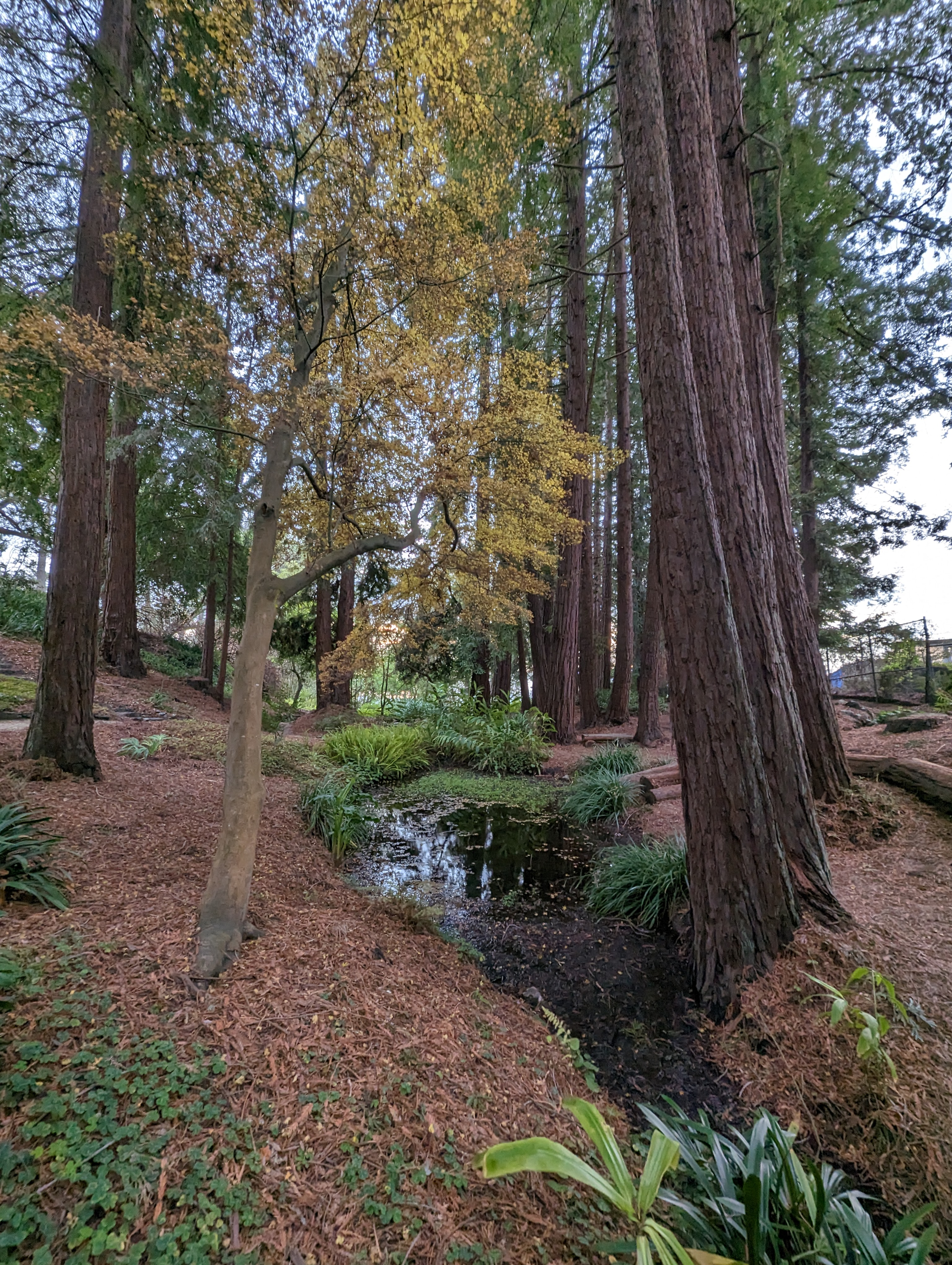
Redwood Canyon and creek

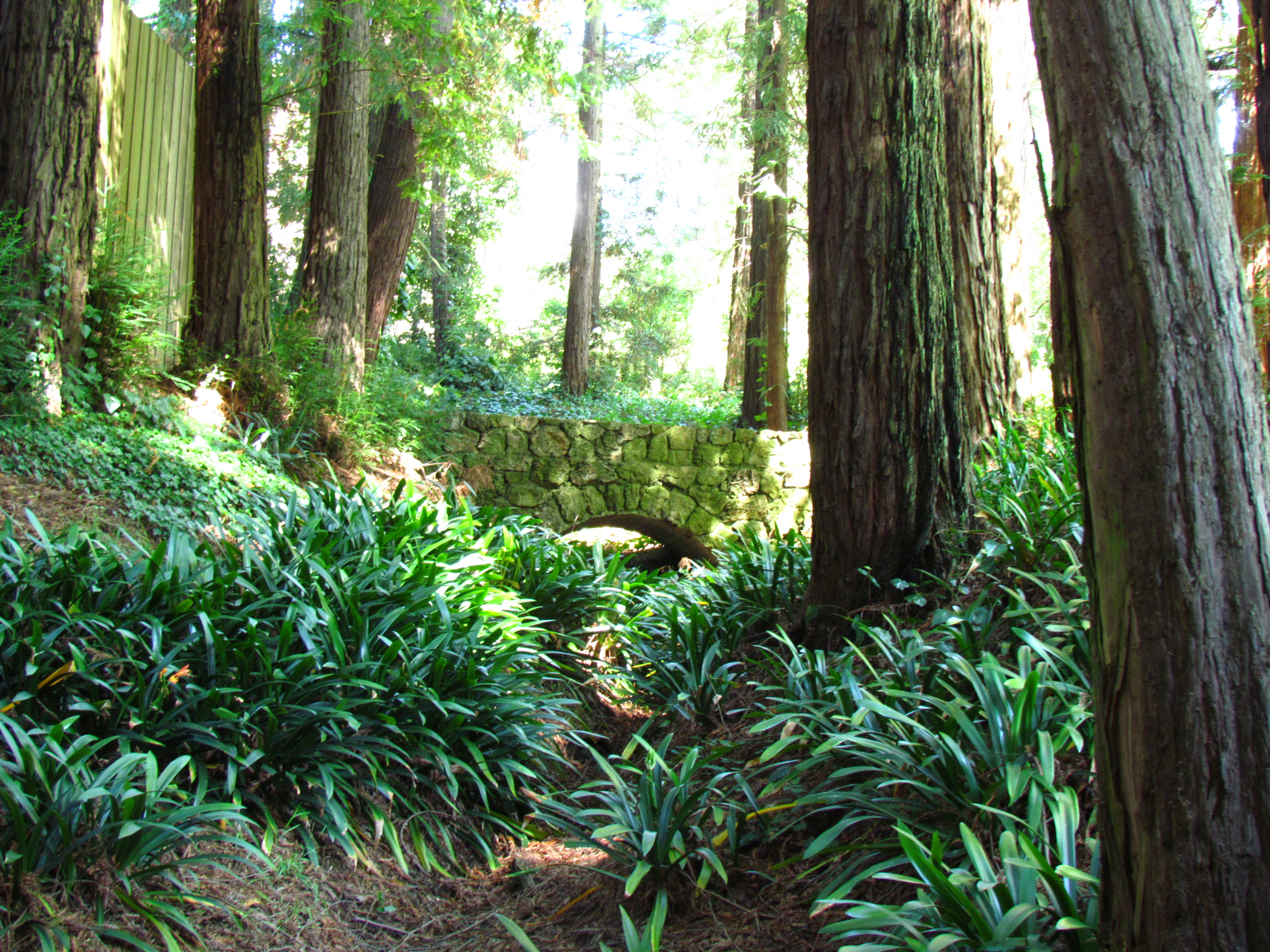
Disconnected stone bridge over the Redwood Canyon stream

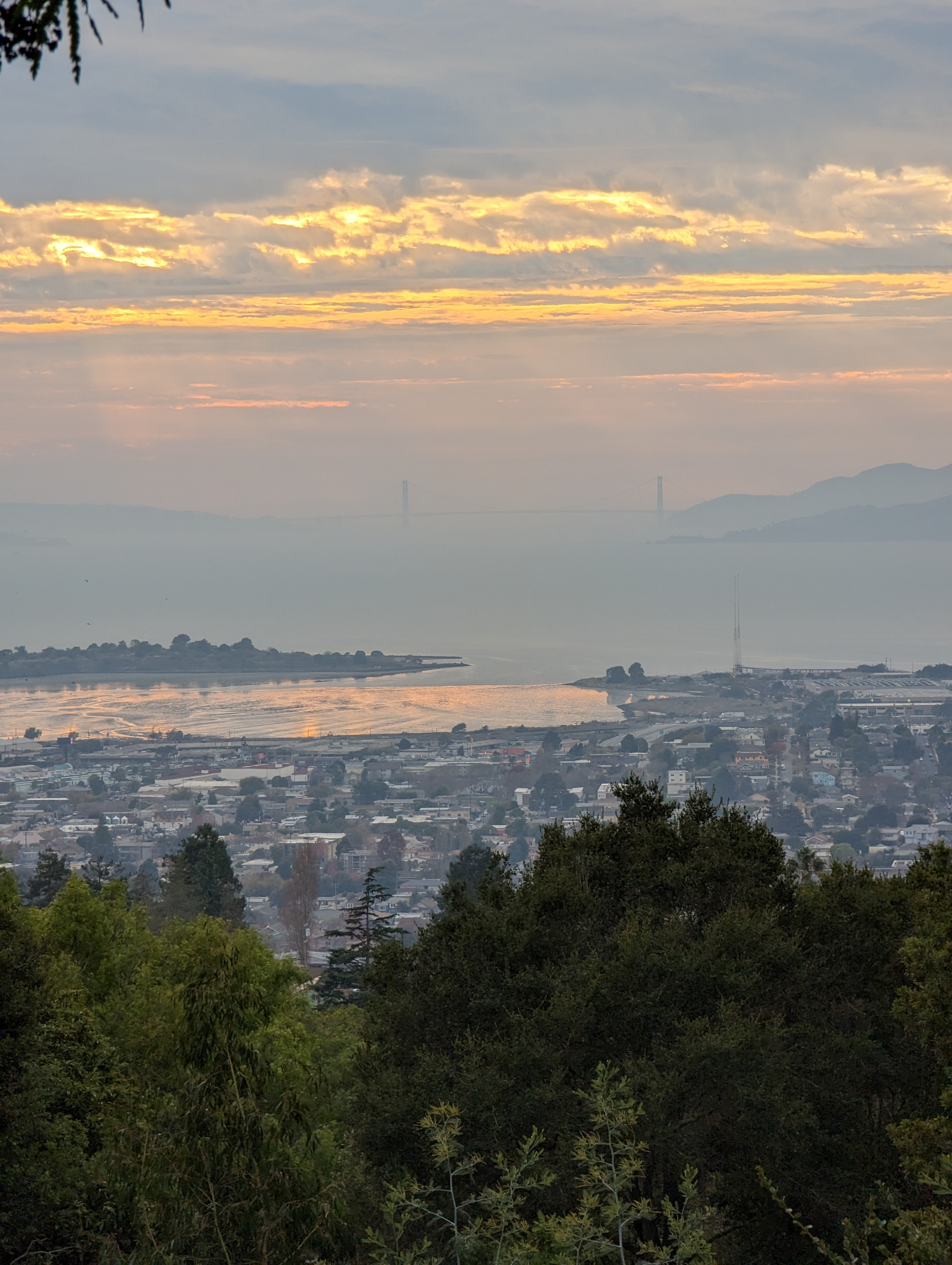
View west to the Golden Gate Bridge

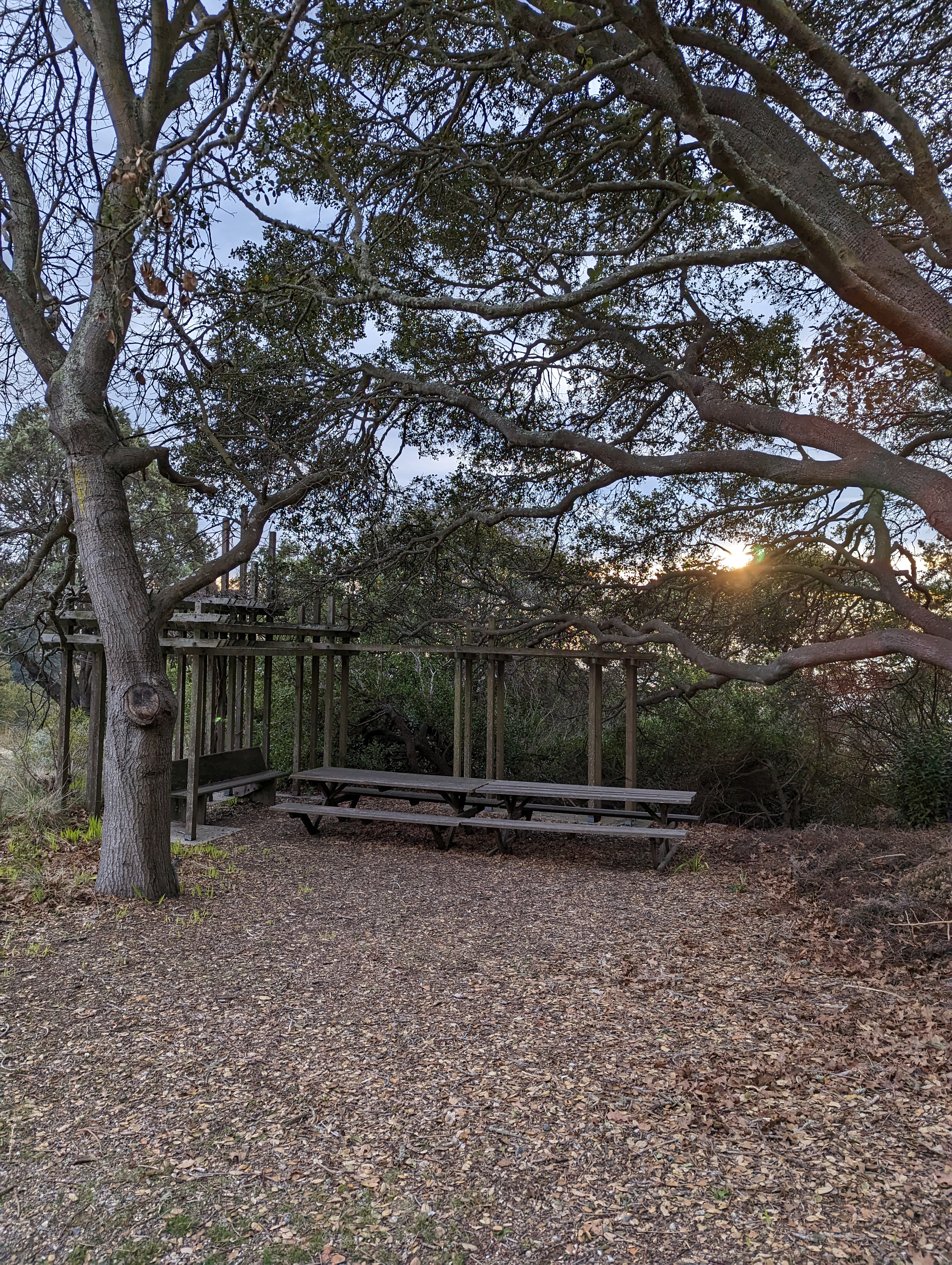
Garrett Eckbo pergola in the Mediterranean Garden

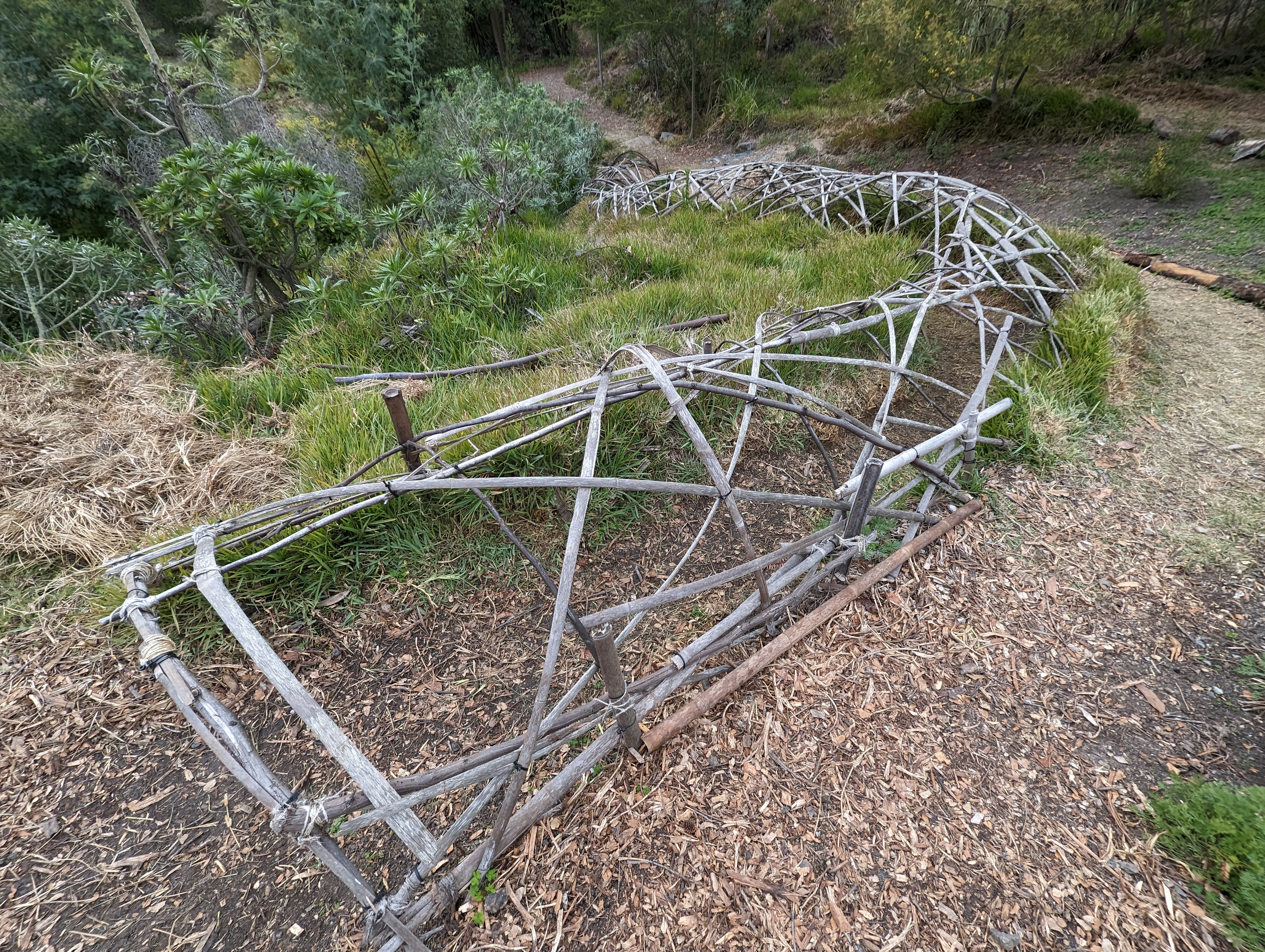
Blackberry brush tunnel in Australian Hollow

There are two streams on-site, draining the north and south edges; both were stabilized with vegetation during construction. The Redwood Canyon, with redwood cuttings brought from the Blakes' properties in Berkeley and St. Helena, is planted along a natural waterway. It also divides the property from the adjacent Carmelite Monastery. In Symmes' original design, the adjoining Edwin Blake garden was designed to be a contiguous extension of the Anson and Anita Blake property; the Carmelites later built a fence north of the canyon, disconnecting a stone bridge that spans the stream. Most of the plants here are shade-tolerant.

Plantings on the steep slope west of the house include the Mediterranean Garden, a showcase of drought-tolerant plants from the world's Mediterranean climates in diamond-shaped beds linked by switchback paths leading to a lookout over the Bay on the property's western edge, near a large lawsonite rock outcropping and a picnic shelter reconstructed by Professor Garrett Eckbo.

The original plan also shows a lake in the Australian Hollow, the southwestern corner of the property, taking advantage of the high water table in that part of the garden. In 2010 this area was restored to a native wetland by UC students, volunteers and Blake Garden staff. The wetland now provides habitat to a community of Pacific chorus frogs and area birds. This area is distinguished by a thornless blackberry brush tunnel.

South of Blake House, Anita Blake and Mabel Symmes had planned and built a formal, symmetric Rose Garden surrounding a square pool. This is now the Square Garden, retaining the water lily-filled pond, but with flower beds brimming with low-water perennials instead of roses. The area southeast of the House has been developed as the Cut Flower Garden, including the Cottage Garden, which has roses, flowers for cutting, vegetables and herbs and the Event Lawn and surrounding beds, another example of water-smart gardening. Additionally, the Create with Nature Zone offers a space for visitors of all ages to experiment and build with materials collected from the garden.

== Residents ==
- 1928–1962: Blake family (Anson Blake, Anita Blake, and Mabel Symmes)
- 1962–1964: Prytanean Alumni Foundation (female graduate students)
- 1969–1975: UC President Charles J. Hitch
- 1975–1983: UC President David S. Saxon
- 1983–1992: none, but hosted official events
- 1992–1995: UC President Jack Peltason
- 1995–2003: UC President Richard C. Atkinson
- 2003–2008: UC President Robert C. Dynes

== See also ==
- List of botanical gardens and arboretums in California
- List of botanical gardens in the United States
