= Lanette Scheeline =

American artist and textile designer

- Born: September 15, 1910; San Francisco, California
- Died: June 8, 2001 (aged 90)
- Education: University of California, Berkeley
- Known for: Artist and textile designer

Lanette Harriet Scheeline (September 15, 1910 - June 8, 2001) was an American artist and textile designer. Her work focused on wallpaper, textile and block printing.

== Early life and education ==
Lanette Scheeline was born in San Francisco, California in 1910. In 1932, she graduated from the University of California, Berkeley. She studied briefly at the Rudolph Schaeffer School of Design and the University of California, Los Angeles.

== Career ==
She was an art teacher, and then started working at the screenprinting company Louma Prints in San Francisco. In November 1936, her work was on the cover of Sunset. World War II started, she left Louma and started working at a shipyard in Marin County, California. She would eventually start her own studio. It was located in Mill Valley. She started designing wallpaper. In 1940 she exhibited her work at the Golden Gate International Exposition. As of 1955 she had started doing work for William Katzenbach and the design firm he ran, Katzenbach and Warren. She designed the "Tree" mural decoration. Around 1960 she relocated to New York.

== Later life and death ==
She died on June 8, 2001, in New Jersey.

== Legacy ==
Her work is found in the collection of the Cooper-Hewitt, National Design Museum.

== Selected publications ==
- Katzenbach, Lois and William Katzenbach. The Practical Book of American Wallpapers. 1951.
