= Hazel Salmi =

American visual artist (1893–1986)

Hazel Gowan Salmi
- Born: Hazel P. Gowan; November 11, 1893; Rockport, Mendocino County, California, U.S.
- Died: April 22, 1986 (aged 92); San Pablo, California, U.S.
- Education: California School of Design (BFA), Rudolph Schaeffer School of Design, University of California, Berkeley, California College of Arts and Crafts
- Occupations: Visual artist, arts administrator
- Known for: Founder of Richmond Art Center, painter, flower arranger, leather worker
- Spouse: Martin Emanuel Salmi (m. 1916–1964; his death)
- Children: 1

Hazel Gowan Salmi (November 11, 1893 – April 22, 1986) was an American visual artist, educator, and arts administrator. She was a painter, as well as the founder and director of the Richmond Art Center. She lived in Point Richmond, California for many years.

== Early life and education ==
Hazel Gowan Salmi was born on November 11, 1893, in Rockport, an unincorporated community in Mendocino County, California. She was the child of Stella Bella (née Brown) and Ernest Albert Gowan.

She graduated from California School of Design (later known as San Francisco Art Institute) in 1912. She continued her arts education at Rudolph Schaeffer School of Design in San Francisco, the University of California, Berkeley, and at California College of Arts and Crafts (now California College of the Arts).

In 1916, she married Martin Emanuel Salmi. They had one son.

== Career ==
In 1921, Salmi decided to move to the San Francisco Bay Area permanently, settling in Point Richmond, California. There were no art classes or resources, so she started to teach art classes. In 1936, Salmi began teaching classes under the Emergency Education Program (EEP) of the Works Progress Administration (WPA). In 1938, the City of Richmond granted Salmi an old Health Department building to use for classes and exhibitions.

In the 1940s, Salmi and other artists petitioned the City of Richmond to include a permanent art center as part of the new downtown Civic Center development. In 1950 Richmond Art Center became an independent 501(c)(3) nonprofit. The Richmond Art Center's new facilities building opened in 1951, as part of the downtown Civic Center development. From 1936 until 1960, Salmi worked as the founding director of the Richmond Art Center.

She died at age 92 in a convalescent hospital in San Pablo, California.
