= Mai Kitazawa Arbegast =

American landscape architect

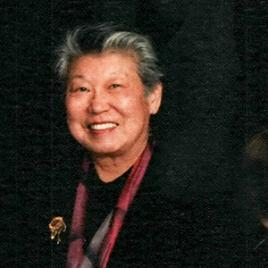
- Born: 1922; San Jose, California
- Died: 2012 (aged 89–90); Berkeley, California
- Education: Oberlin College; Cornell University; University of California, Berkeley
- Occupation: Landscape Architect
- Known for: Hearst Castle; California Palace of the Legion of Honor; Oakland Museum of California; Trefethen Vineyards
- Awards: Horticulturist of the Year (AABGA); Distinguished Alumni Award (College of Environmental Design)

Mai Haru Kitazawa Arbegast (1922–2012) was an American landscape architect, and professor based in Berkeley, California. She was a professor in the Department of Landscape Architecture at Berkeley. She was the first acting director Blake Garden after its gift to the UC Berkeley Department of Landscape Architecture . As a professional landscape architect who specialized in planting design and her work included estates, wineries, and large scale residential gardens, as well as public, commercial, and educational projects. Projects of note include the Hearst Castle planting restoration, California Palace of the Legion of Honor renovation, and the UC Davis Arboretum.

== Early life ==
Mai Arbegast was born in San Jose, California in 1922, the oldest of six children. Her father, Gijiu Kitazawa, and uncle started the Kitazawa Seed Company and nursery in 1917. When they split the business, Gijiu moved the seed operation to a downtown San Jose storefront and sold seeds wholesale and retail, adding his own line of Asian vegetables. The Kitazawa Seed Company became the main seed source for Japanese tenant farmers in California and Oregon. In an interview with Margaret Schulze for NikkeiWest Mai recalled, “I spent much of my early life in boots stomping on particular tomatoes and collecting the seed for further crosses.”

== Education ==
Arbegast attended San Jose State College until 1942 when her family was evicted and sent to the Heart Mountain Relocation Center in Wyoming. The family got a sponsor and clearance to move to Michigan until World War II ended while Mai attended Oberlin College, graduating in 1945. She went on to Cornell University where she was "the only woman around as a graduate student in Horticulture from 1947-49." She graduated from Cornell with a Master of Science in Ornamental Horticulture. She later went on to the University of California, Berkeley where both she and her husband, David Arbegast, graduated with Masters of Science in Landscape Architecture in 1953.

== Career ==
Following graduation, she began teaching in the Department of Landscape Architecture at Berkeley. She taught both full and part-time and her classes covered plant materials, horticulture, and planting design. She often took her students to the nearby Blake Estate for field study. Arbegast played a key role in the gift of Blake Garden to the UC Berkeley Department of Landscape Architecture and was its first acting director after the transfer in 1957. While teaching she also maintained a part-time professional practice. In 1967, she gave up teaching to practice full-time and continued through 2003.

Arbegast specialized in planting design and her work included estates, wineries, and large scale residential gardens, as well as public, commercial, and educational projects. Projects of note include the Hearst Castle planting restoration, California Palace of the Legion of Honor renovation, UC Davis Arboretum, Trefethen Vineyards, the Oakland Museum restoration with Gerry Scott, the Great Highway renovation with Michael Painter, and the UC Berkeley Master Plan with ROMA Design Group. She frequently worked as a horticultural consultant to both architects and landscape architects including Herzog & de Meuron, MLTW/Turnbull Associates, Robert A.M. Stern, Lawrence Halprin, Richard Haag, Peter Walker, her husband's firm Arbegast, Newton, Griffith, and other larger firms including EDAW and SWA.

== Legacy ==
Arbegast was involved in the community as a member and trustee of many boards and foundations including the University of California Botanical Garden, Filoli Center Founding Committee, Saratoga Horticulture Foundation, American Association of Botanic Gardens and Arboreta (AABGA), San Francisco Bay Conservation and Development Commission Design Review Board, and the Strybing Arboretum Society. She also served on the City of Berkeley Planning Commission, Board of Adjustments, and Waterfront Advisory Committee. In addition to the transfer of Blake Garden, Arbegast was key in the transfer of Filoli Gardens to the National Trust and was largely responsible for the donation of Beatrix Farrand’s Reef Point Collection and Endowments to the UC Berkeley Department of Landscape Architecture. She received the Distinguished Alumni Award from the College of Environmental Design in 2002 and received a Horticulturist of the Year Award from AABGA.

=== Archive ===
The Mai Kitazawa Arbegast Collection is held by the Environmental Design Archives at the University of California, Berkeley. The collection spans the years 1933–2007 and documents her education, teaching career, and private practice. The bulk of the collection relates to her landscape design projects and includes project files, correspondence, drawings, photographs, and slides. Well documented projects include the UC Davis Arboretum (1975–1977), Trefethen Vineyards (1976–1990), California Palace of the Legion of Honor renovation (1991–1995), and the Embarcadero Center (1992, 1996). Arrangement and description of this collection was funded by the Beatrix Farrand Endowment courtesy of the Department of Landscape Architecture and Environmental Planning.
