= Henry Doane =

American painter (1905–1999)

- Born: Henry Waltermar Doane; 1905; Cambridge, Massachusetts, U.S.
- Died: 1999 (aged 93–94); Oakland, California, U.S.
- Education: California College of Arts and Crafts; Rudolph Schaeffer School of Design
- Occupations: Landscape painter; commercial artist

Henry Waltermar Doane (1905, Cambridge, Massachusetts – 1999, Oakland, California) was an American landscape painter and commercial artist, known for his mining themed paintings.

== Biography ==
He came to California in 1907 at age two. He studied at the California College of Arts and Crafts in Oakland, and the Rudolph Schaeffer School of Design in San Francisco, and he had private lessons with Charles Horton, Otis Sheppard, and John Gerrity.

He worked for over 40 years in display advertising, retiring in 1969, but during this time, he did fine-art painting. He was President of the Society of Western Artists and taught watercolor painting, which he began exhibiting in the 1940s.

He exhibited at the Oakland Museum, DeYoung Museum, California Palace of the Legion of Honor, Crocker Gallery in Stockton, St. Mary's Gallery, Richmond Art Center and the Northwood Gallery in Midland, Michigan. From 1952 to 1979, he led watercolor workshops in Virginia City, Nevada, and for many years served as juror for art shows.
