= Sigma Lambda Alpha (honor society) =

American landscape architecture honor society

- ΣΛΑ
- Founded: September 24, 1977; 49 years ago University of Minnesota
- Type: Honor
- Affiliation: ACHS
- Status: Active
- Emphasis: Landscape Architecture
- Scope: International
- Colors: Gold and Green
- Chapters: 54
- Members: 10,443 lifetime
- Headquarters: PO Box 115706; Gainesville, Florida 32611; United States

Sigma Lambda Alpha (ΣΛΑ) is a North American scholastic honor society that recognizes academic achievement among students in the field of landscape architecture. It was established in 1977 at the University of Minnesota by the Council of Educators in Landscape Architecture.

== History ==
Beta Alpha Sigma, an honor society for landscape architecture, allied arts, and urban planning at Michigan State University in the 1960s, inspired Sigma Lambda Alpha. In 1976, the president of the Council of Educators in Landscape Architecture (CELA), professor R. E. Toth, had the idea of establishing a collegiate honor society for landscape architecture students. The CELA executive board established Sigma Lambda Alpha was founded at University of Minnesota in Minneapolis on September 24, 1977.

Wiliam H. Snyder of the University of Idaho was appointed the first executive secretary of Sigma Lambda Alpha and was charged with convening a task force to form the society. Sigma Lambda Alpha was established as a scholastic honor society to recognize the academic achievements of landscape architecture students and help prepare them for their careers in landscape architecture. The purpose of Sigma Lambda Alpha is "to encourage, recognize, and reward academic excellence in preparation for the profession of landscape architecture". It places a strong emphasis on leadership and preserving the traditions of husbandry of the land.

Sigma Lambda Alpha was admitted to the Association of College Honor Societies in 1983 and achieved full membership in 1986. It was incorporated as a nonprofit organization in Michigan on April 11, 1989. However, it continues to pperate within CELA.

As of 2011, the society had chartered 55 collegiate chapters in the United States, along with its Alpha Founders Chapter for distinguished and founding members. It became international in 2014 with the chartering of a chapter at the University of Guelph in Canada. Since 1977 the society has inducted 10,443 members. Its records from 1972 to 2007 are archived at the University of Idaho.

== Symbols ==
The Greek letters Sigma, Lambda, and Alpha were selected to represent "Scholar, Landscape Architect". Sigma Lambda Alpha's colors are gold and green. Its mottos are “Scholar, architect of the land, embraces the whole of nature and art” and “Fit mankind to the earth and the earth to mankind.”

== Activities ==
The society provides an annual award for contributions to landscape architecture scholarship and historical literature. Sigma Lambda Alpha awards scholarships to one undergraduate and one graduate student each year. It also awards six travel grants annually to its members.

== Membership ==
Members include undergraduates, graduate students, faculty, staff, and professionals. Membership is open to landscape architecture undergraduate students with a 3.4 GPA and graduate students with a 3.5 GPA who have completed one-third of the degree requirements. The society invites faculty, staff, and professionals to join as Honorary or Distinguished Members based on their accomplishments.

== Chapters ==
In the following list, active chapters are indicated in bold and inactive chapters are in italics.

Chapter	Charter date	Institution	Location	Status	Ref.
**Alpha**	1977	Alpha Founders; Members-at-Large		Active	
**Beta**	1978	University of Idaho	Moscow, Idaho	Active	
**Gamma**	1978	Michigan State University	East Lansing, Michigan	Active	
**Delta**	1979	Texas A&M University	College Station, Texas	Active	
**Epsilon**	1978	Louisiana State University	Baton Rouge, Louisiana	Active	
**Zeta**	1979	Utah State University	Logan, Utah	Active	
**Eta**	1979	University of Minnesota	Minneapolis Minnesota	Active	
**Theta**	1979	California Polytechnic State University, San Luis Obispo	San Luis Obispo, California	Active	
**Iota**	1979	University of Arizona (see Alpha Zeta)	Tucson, Arizona	Active	
**Kappa**	1979	Texas Tech University	Lubbock, Texas	Active	
**Lambda**	1979	Pennsylvania State University		Active	
**Mu**	1979	California State Polytechnic University, Pomona	Pomona, California	Active	
**Nu**	1979	State University of New York College of Environmental Science and Forestry	Syracuse, New York	Active	
**Xi**	1979	Purdue University	West Lafayette, Indiana	Active	
**Omicron**	1979	University of Florida	Gainesville, Florida	Active	
**Pi**	1980	Washington State University	Pullman, Washington	Active	
**Rho**	1980	Ohio State University	Columbus, Ohio	Active	
**Sigma**	1980	University of Georgia	Athens, Georgia	Active	
**Tau**	1981	Ball State University	Muncie, Indiana	Active	
**Upsilon**	1981	Rutgers University		Active	
**Phi**	1981	Kansas State University	Manhattan, Kansas	Active	
**Chi**	1982	University of California, Davis	Davis, California	Active	
**Psi**	1982	University of Illinois Urbana-Champaign	Champaign, Illinois	Active	
**Omega**	1982	Virginia Tech	Blacksburg, Virginia	Active	
**Alpha Alpha**	1983	Morgan State University	Baltimore, Maryland	Active	
**Alpha Beta**	1984	West Virginia University	Morgantown, West Virginia	Active	
**Alpha Gamma**	1985	University of Wisconsin–Madison	Madison, Wisconsin	Active	
**Alpha Delta**	1985	Oklahoma State University–Stillwater	Stillwater, Oklahoma	Active	
**Alpha Epsilon**	1985	Auburn University	Auburn, Alabama	Active	
**Alpha Zeta**	1987	University of Arizona (see Iota)	Tucson, Arizona	Active	
**Alpha Eta**	1988	University of Texas at Arlington	Arlington, Texas	Active	
**Alpha Theta**	1988	University of Colorado Denver	Denver, Colorado	Active	
**Alpha Iota**	1988	University of Arkansas	Fayetteville, Arkansas	Active	
**Alpha Kappa**	1990	University of Washington	Seattle, Washington	Active	
**Alpha Lambda**	1988	Mississippi State University	Starkville, Mississippi	Active	
**Alpha Mu**	1989	University of Kentucky	Lexington, Kentucky	Active	
**Alpha Nu**	1989	Colorado State University	Fort Collins, Colorado	Active	
Alpha Xi	1990	University of Michigan	Ann Arbor, Michigan	Inactive	
**Alpha Omicron**	1990	University of Massachusetts Amherst	Amherst, Massachusetts	Active	
	2014	University of Guelph	Guelph, Ontario, Canada	Active	
		Clemson University	Clemson, South Carolina	Active	
		Florida International University	Miami, Florida	Active	
		Iowa State University	Ames, Iowa	Active	
		New York State College of Agriculture and Life Sciences at Cornell University	Ithaca, New York	Active	
		North Carolina A&T State University	Greensboro, North Carolina	Active	
		North Carolina State University	Raleigh, North Carolina	Active	
		South Dakota State University	Brookings, South Dakota	Active	
		Temple University	Philadelphia, Pennsylvania	Active	
		University of California, Berkeley	Riverside, California	Active	
		University of Nebraska–Lincoln	Lincoln, Nebraska	Active	
		University of Nevada, Las Vegas	Las Vegas, Nevada	Active	
		University of Rhode Island	Kingston, Rhode Island	Active	
		University of Virginia	Charlottesville, Virginia	Active	

== Notable members ==
- Grant Jones, landscape architect
- Geraldine Knight Scott, landscape architect and professor at the University of California, Berkeley

== See also ==
- Association of College Honor Societies
- Honor society
