= Maxine Albro =

American artist (1893–1966)

- Maxine Albro, photographed by Imogen Cunningham in 1931
- Born: 20 January 1893; Ayrshire, Iowa, US
- Died: 19 July 1966 (aged 73); Los Angeles, California, US
- Known for: Painting, Mural, Lithography, Mosaic, Sculpture

Maxine Albro (January 20, 1893 – July 19, 1966) was an American painter, muralist, lithographer, mosaic artist, and sculptor. She was one of America's leading female artists, and one of the few women commissioned under the New Deal's Federal Art Project.

== Biographical sketch ==
Ethel Maxine Albro was born in 1893 in Ayrshire, Iowa, the daughter of Frank Albro, a grain buyer and piano salesman, and Cordelia Mead. She had an older brother, Francis, and a younger brother, Harold. She spent part of her youth in Estherville, Iowa. She grew up in Los Angeles. Her father's family came from England and settled in Rhode Island before moving west, and her mother's ancestors were of Irish-English descent.

Photographer Imogen Cunningham took a portrait of a shrouded Albro in 1931.

On March 28, 1938, Albro married fellow artist Parker Hall in Pima, Arizona. They moved to Carmel, California, and together they would return to Mexico numerous times throughout their lives.

Albro was a member of the American Artists' Congress, California Society of Mural Artists, California Art Club, and the Carmel Art Association.

Albro was 73 years old when she died in Los Angeles in 1966.

== Career ==
In 1920, she moved to San Francisco after graduating from high school and worked as a commercial artist, then traveled to Paris to study at the Académie de la Grande Chaumière for a year. After she returned, Albro studied at the California School of Fine Arts from 1923 to 1925. A year later, she enrolled in the Art Students League of New York. In the early 1920s, she lived in Burlingame, California. In 1927, she first visited Mexico, where she would study fresco painting with Pablo O'Higgins, one of Diego Rivera's assistants, and eventually made the acquaintance of Diego Rivera.

== Works ==
Starting from 1925, Albro exhibited her works at the annual San Francisco Art Association show and influenced other artists to travel to Mexico, winning local fame as "a little Diego Rivera" and leading to numerous private commissions in 1929 and 1930, including the Spanish Farm fresco for the Allied Arts Guild in Menlo Park, California. In 1931, Albro had a major exhibition in New York City, in accord with the modern Mexican art renaissance that had been fostered in the city's galleries. Her first showing consisted of 30 paintings and 30 drawings, which The Art Digest called "a critical as well as a popular triumph."

Albro was one of the few women who were part of the Works Progress Administration's Federal Art Project, a program initiated under President Franklin Roosevelt's New Deal. Due to the high rate of joblessness during the Great Depression, these art programs were required to employ female artists, making this period the first time in history in which women were hired without discrimination in the United States. Her first WPA commission was for one of the murals at Coit Tower. According to Albro, she traded the wall she had originally picked with an adjacent one selected by Victor Arnautoff at his request. She was assisted by artist George Michael Gaethke on the Coit Tower mural.

California, Maxine Albro, 1934 (at Coit Tower, San Francisco)

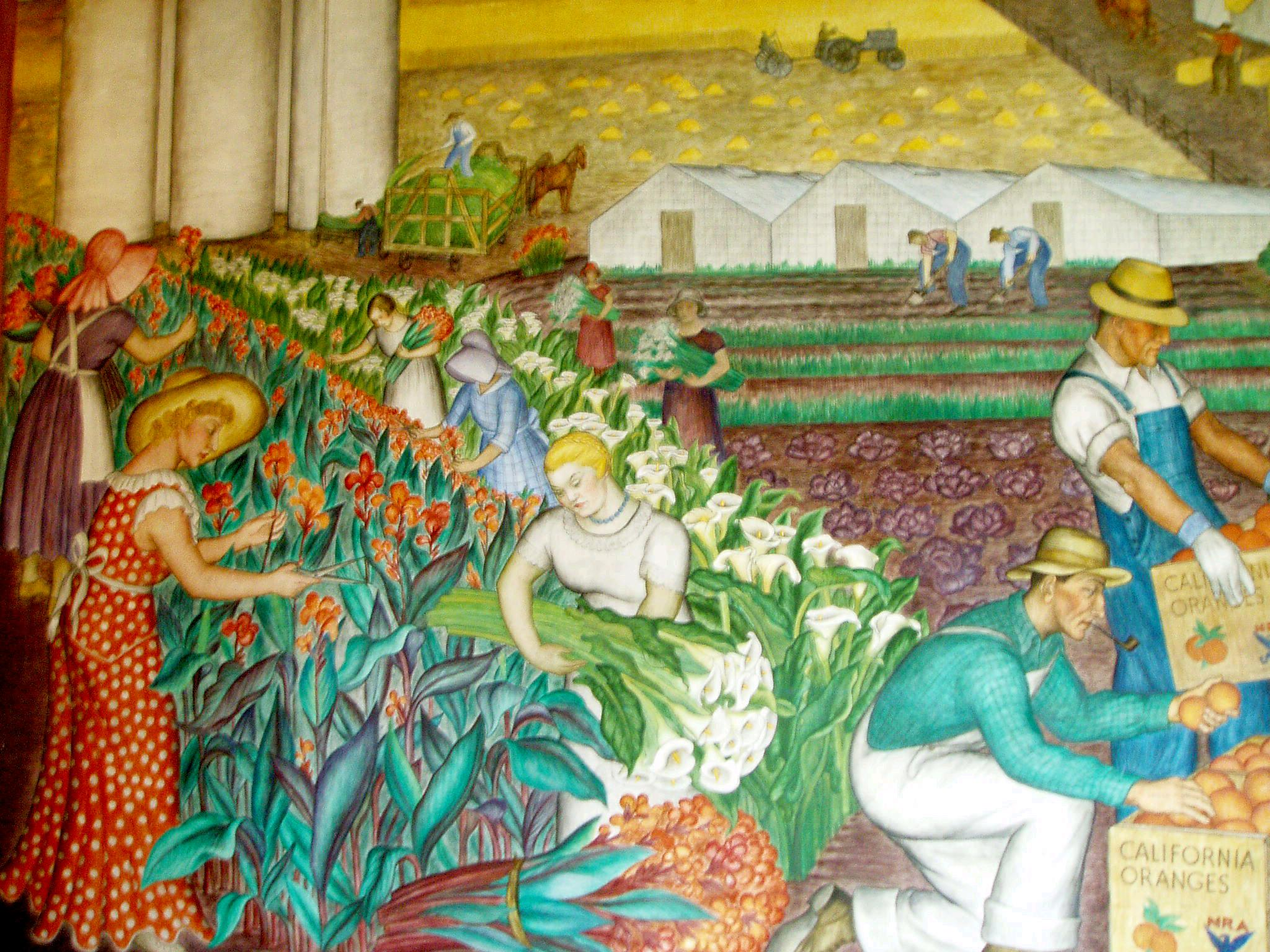
left half

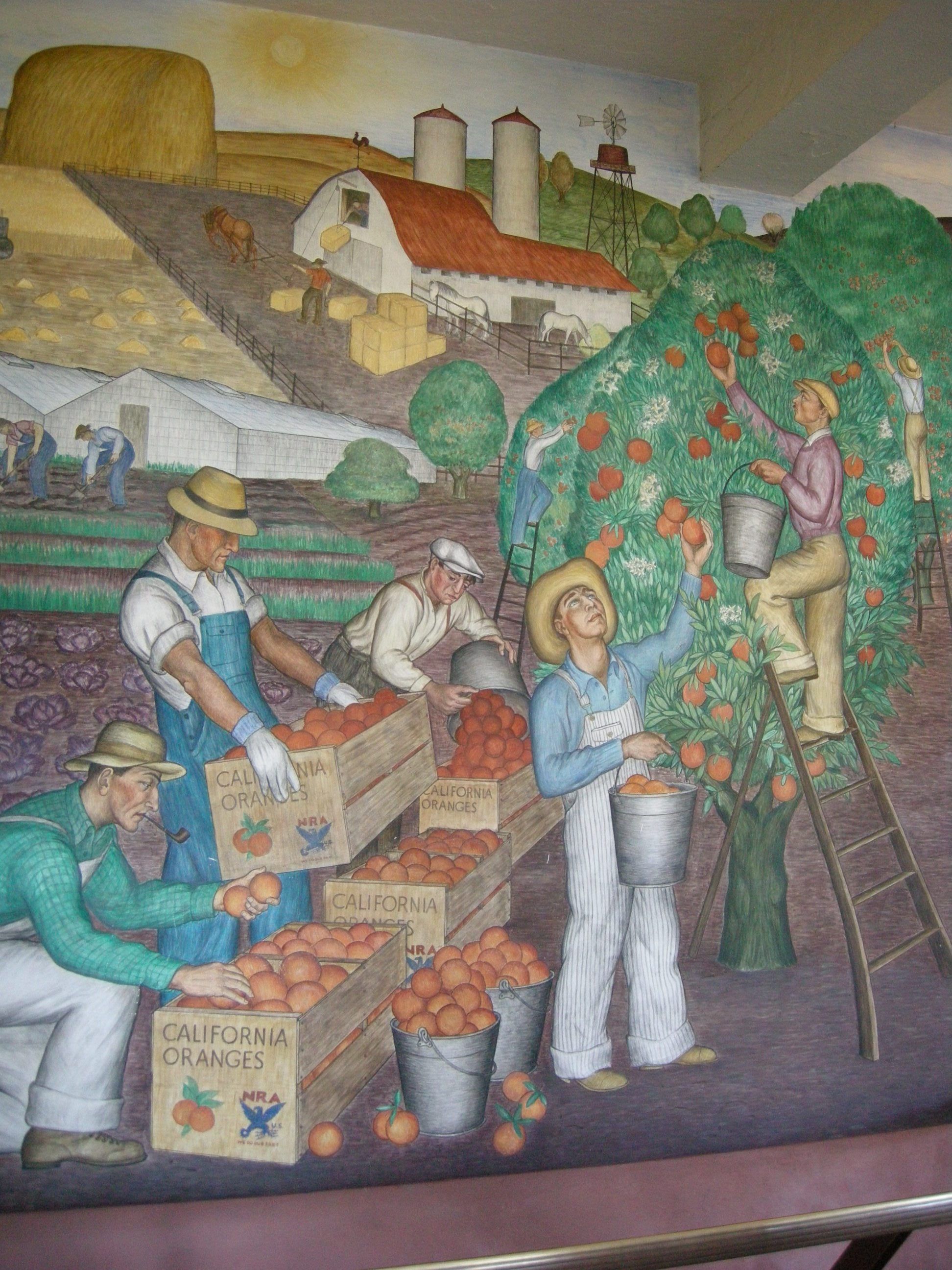
right half

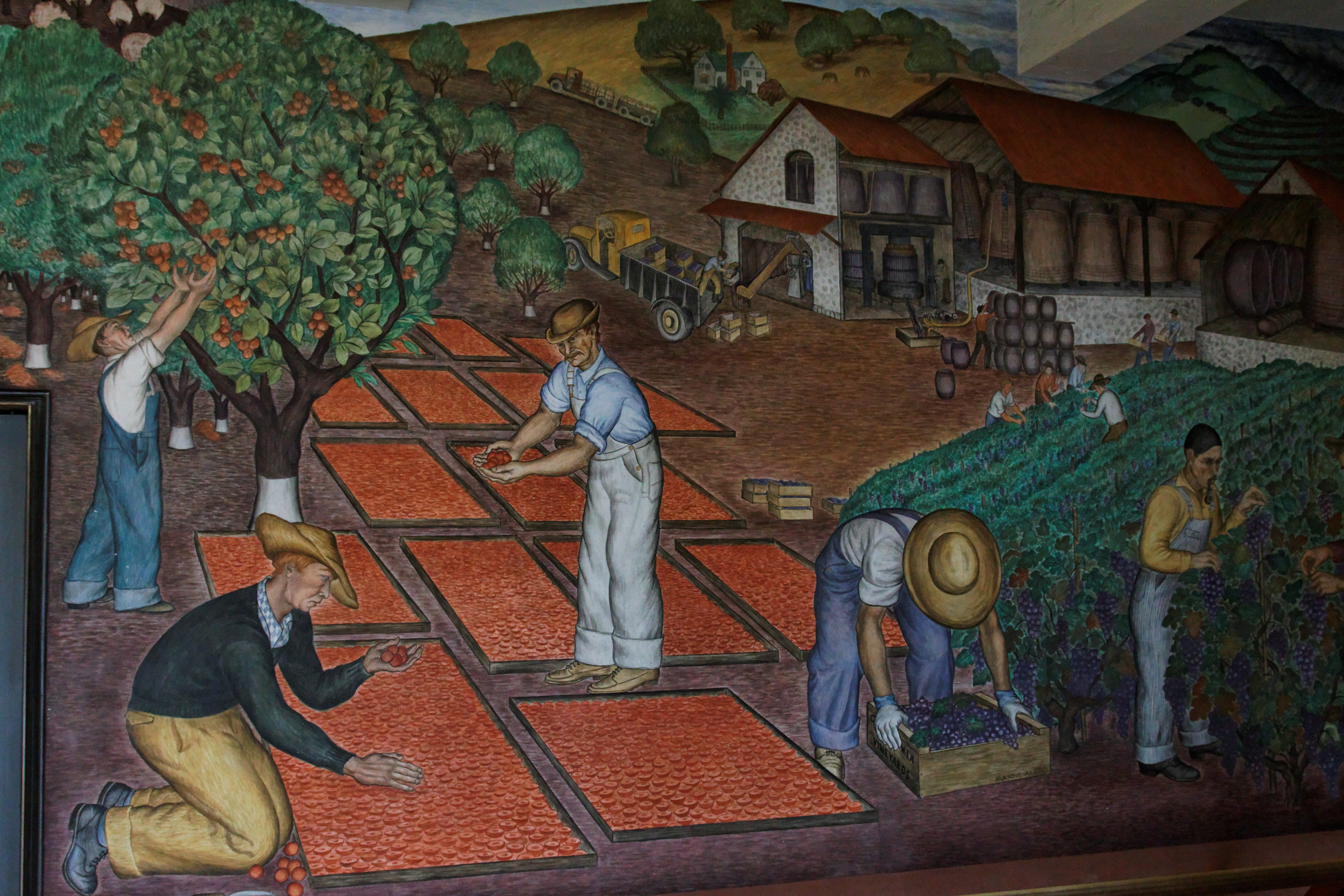
continuation

Throughout the 1930s, Albro executed many commissions under the federal program, including a mosaic at San Francisco State Teacher's College in 1936, over the entrance to Woods Hall at the southeast corner of Haight and Buchanan. None of the artists working on the mosaic had ever created art in that medium, and the WPA had to hire an Italian mosaic setter that taught them how to break marble to create mosaic pieces and set them. The mosaic is no longer visible, having either been stored and then lost, or destroyed during removal when the campus was moved and the Teacher's College building was renamed to Anderson Hall at the University of California Extension in San Francisco.

Outside of artwork commissioned for public buildings, Albro painted frescoes for many private homes, including the entrance and courtyard of the Seldon Williams House in Berkeley, California, designed by Julia Morgan and completed in 1928.

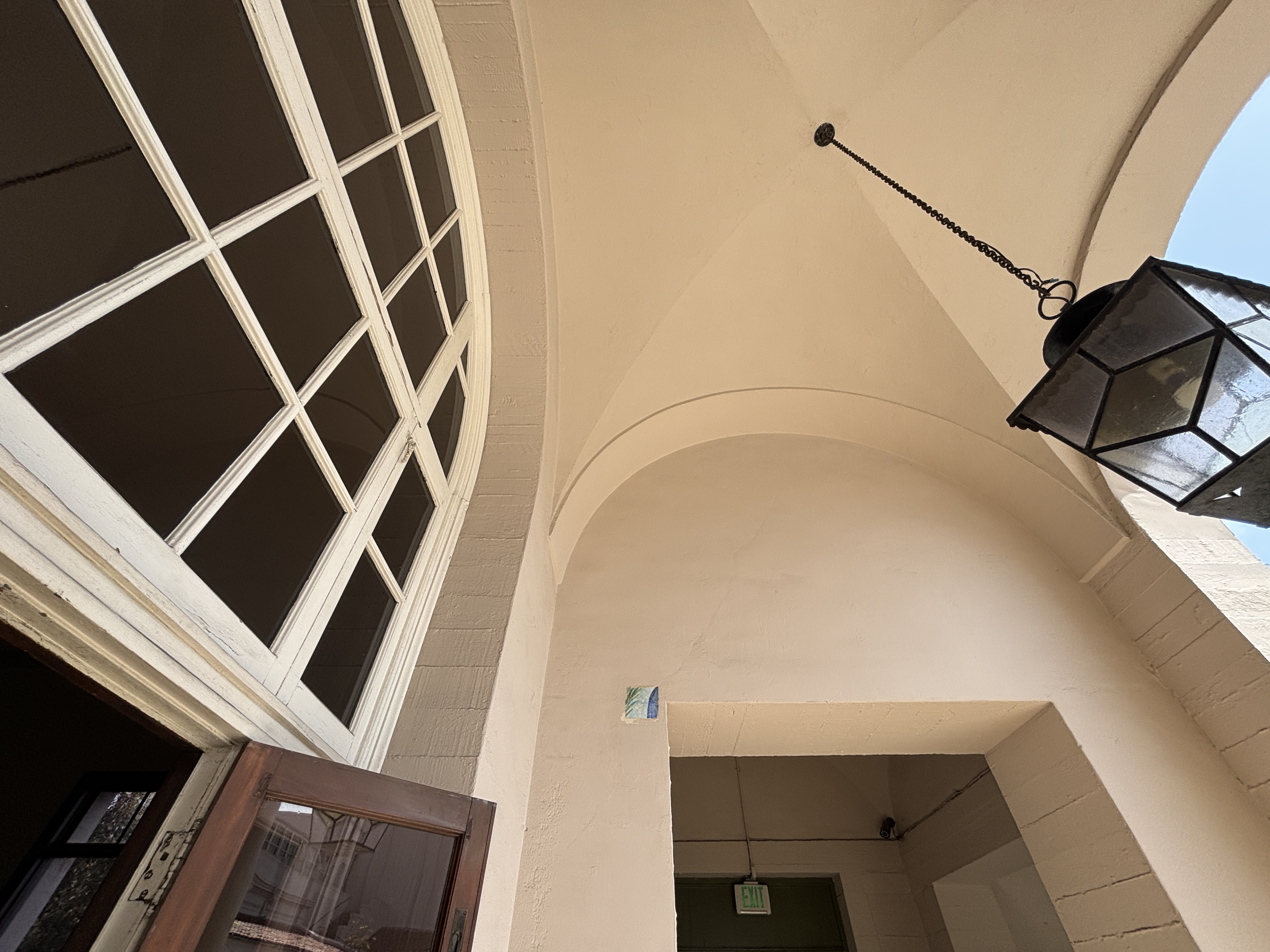
Fragment of the Maxine Albro frescoes at Ebell of Los Angeles, revealed during restoration (2025)

Maxine Albro painted The Four Sybils on the walls of the central courtyard of the Ebell Women's Club in the 1930's. The "Portly Roman Sybils" offended some of the organization's members and the frescoes were painted over in 1935. That year, several prominent art critics, including the young Arthur Millier, rose to her defense.

"Personally I think they are beautiful decorations which deserve to live and which will be missed," Miller wrote.

The San Francisco News of May 25, 1935, printed the following:

Speaking of murals, Maxine Albro moved right up in line with Diego Rivera, David Siqueiros, and Clifford Wight last month, when the Ebell Club of Los Angeles, after two years of internal squabbling, finally destroyed frescoes of the four Sybils which Miss Albro had painted in the loggia of its more or less Italian Club House.

In early 2025, portions of the frescoes were uncovered.

=== Style ===
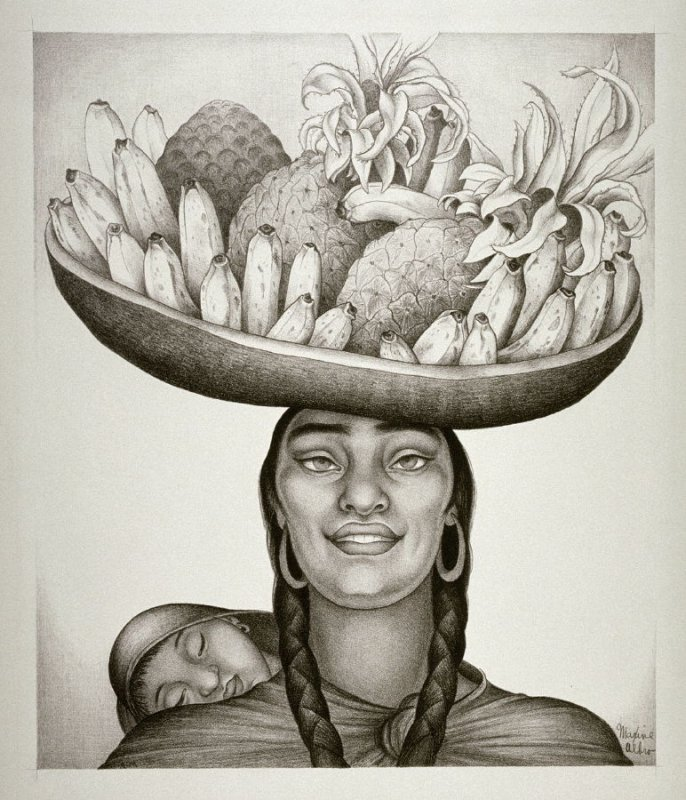
Mexico (lithograph), Maxine Albro, 1933, Fine Arts Museums of San Francisco

Albro's artistic style is described as "clean, bright and clear with the strong rounded forms of this era, often depicting the women of Mexico, in particular those of the Tehuantepec region in Oaxaca."

Her mural titled California at San Francisco's Coit Tower, which depicts the bounty of California's agricultural industry, was produced under the Works Progress Administration program.

In 1934, the Literary Digest wrote about Albro's California, comparing it to the other murals painted inside Coit Tower:

Richest and most vivid is the wall painted by Maxine Albro, reflecting the sunny, abundant fields of California, and their prodigal flow of fruit and grain.

Two years earlier, following a successful Albro exhibition in San Francisco, art critic Junius Cravens wrote in the Argonaut:

In a general way, Maxine Albro's works might be said to be in the contemporary Mexican mode. This impression, however, we feel, is largely due to their subject matter. Her work strikes us as being too essentially refined, and, at times, almost 'pretty' to entirely belong to the so-called Mexican School.

It might rather be said to be a sweetened compromise between the modern Mexican School and that of some of the more native Mexican painters of a past era. For some reason any decorative painting or drawing of a Mexican subject that is done these days is at once credited with the Rivera influence. With the possible exception of one canvas, 'First Communion,' we fail to discover any marked Rivera influence in Albro's work ... because she has so successfully avoided imitating his technique.

Albro's works are nicely rendered, pleasing and should have considerable popular appeal.

=== Influences ===
Albro was most recognized for her frescoes and her characteristic treatment of Mexican and Spanish subject matter. The influence of Mexican art is visible throughout her paintings, murals and lithographs. In an interview two years before her death, Albro said:

I was so influenced by what I had seen in Mexico. ... There is nothing I loved more than painting the Virgin of Guadalupe.

In particular, Albro was strongly influenced by Diego Rivera. "Watching Diego [paint] was very beneficial to me," she said.

=== Impact ===
Albro's works can be found in the Smithsonian American Art Museum, The Museum of Modern Art (MoMA), National Gallery of Art, National Museum of the American Indian, San Francisco's Coit Tower, Fine Arts Museums of San Francisco, Allied Arts Guild, and in various galleries and private collections.

Albro became a leader in the California muralist movement and was one of the first women to achieve such a prominent position. Her work was also highlighted by numerous paintings and lithographs, which are becoming rare and valuable collection pieces. Although she specialized in Spanish and Mexican motifs, she also painted landscapes and street scenes that were inspired by her world travels.

== See also ==
- Visual art of the United States
- Public Works of Art Project
- Federal Art Project
- List of Federal Art Project artists
