= Worth Ryder =

- Born: Woodworth Allen Ryder; November 10, 1884; Kirkwood, Illinois, U.S.
- Died: February 17, 1960 (aged 75); Berkeley, California, U.S.
- Education: University of California, Berkeley, Art Students League of New York, Academy of Fine Arts, Munich
- Known for: Art
- Spouse: Cornelia Meta Breckenfeld
- Children: 1

Wood Allen Ryder (November 10, 1884 – February 17, 1960), was an American artist, curator, and art professor. He has been credited as being, "largely responsible for the United States early interest in avant garde art".

== Life ==
Worth Allen Ryder was born November 10, 1884, in Kirkwood, Illinois. He was one of three children. His father Morgan L. Ryder was a former trustee of the town of Berkeley and worked for the Southern Pacific freight trains. Ryder arrived in Berkeley, California as a young child and graduated from Berkeley High School in 1903. He studied at the University of California, Berkeley, at the Art Students League of New York, from 1906 to 1908 and the Royal Bavarian Academy in Munich (now called the Academy of Fine Arts, Munich).

In 1911, he returned to California, where he taught at the California School of Arts and Crafts (now called the California College of the Arts) until 1918. He also served as curator of the Oakland Art Gallery from 1916 to 1918.

From 1921 to 1927, Ryder continued his art studies in Germany, France, and Italy. One of his teachers was Hans Hofmann. He was instrumental in bringing Hans Hofmann to the United States. It was in the United States where Hofmann had his first solo show at the California Palace of the Legion of Honor and Hoffman taught in the 1930 and 1931 summer sessions at University of California, Berkeley.

Ryder taught art at the University of California, Berkeley from 1926 until his retirement in 1955. Among Ryder's pupils were artists Dorothy Rieber Joralemon, Robert Boardman Howard, Karl Kasten, James McCray, among others.

Ryder died from a heart ailment on February 17, 1960, in Berkeley, California. He was survived by his wife Cornelia Meta Ryder (née Breckenfeld) and daughter Cornelia Beatrice Ryder.

== Legacy ==
The Worth Ryder Art Gallery at the University of California, Berkeley, is named for him. Hans Hofmann donated one of his own paintings to the university in memory of his friend and former student, and in 1963 Hofmann gave the university a major collection of his work and seed money toward creation of the Berkeley Art Museum and Pacific Film Archive.
