= Frank Rieber =

American geophysicist (1891–1948)

- Born: March 12, 1891; Placerville, California
- Died: June 30, 1948 (aged 57); New York City
- Education: B.S. University of California 1915
- Known for: Reproducable recorded seismograms, Geovision, the "Sonogram"
- Scientific career
- Fields: Geophysics, Sound technology

Frank Rieber (March 12, 1891 – June 30, 1948) was a geophysicist, entrepreneur, and inventor. He is particularly remembered for his groundbreaking research in automated seismic data processing. His patents related to reproducible seismograms would lead to the ability to better locate petroleum, and gain widespread use and recognition by improving the fidelity of seismographs in accurately depicting underground rock strata and oil structures, particularly in areas with complex geological formations.

== Early years and education ==
Frank Rieber was born in Placerville, California, on March 12, 1891, the son of Dr. Charles Henry Rieber, esteemed long-time Dean of the College of Letters and Science at the University of California at Los Angeles, and Winifred Smith Rieber, a skilled professional artist, well known for her portraits of famous philosophers, educators, and scientists. Rieber graduated from Berkeley High School and, in 1915, received his B.S. degree from the University of California, Berkeley.

== Professional career ==
After a year with the Western Precipitation Company, Rieber started his own business in San Francisco developing X-ray equipment, including mobile X-ray machines that could be administered in a truck. By 1922, his inventions with X-Ray technology allowed operators to more precisely control the amount of radiation administered. One benefit of his invention was allowing oncologists to more effectively and relatively more safely treat cancerous growths with radiation therapy. After this period, he operated his own companies.

During World War I, Rieber was a secretary of the California War Inventions Committee and a member of the Submarine Defense Commission. It was during his war work with sonic submarine detection and depth sounding that he became interested in the application of related techniques to the location of oil structures.

=== Refraction seismographic work ===
In 1924, he began research and operations with the refraction seismograph in California where he developed and introduced methods and instrumentation for determining velocities of, and depths to strata of low velocity contrast in the sedimentary series. Out of this period came a number of determinations of velocity still listed as standards in the literature, and maps of many of the shallow trends in California which have since been confirmed by drilling and subsequent reflection seismograph exploration.

Rieber was more scientist than businessman, and his companies were more than once among those which did not survive cut-backs in exploration by the oil industry. During such periods, he employed his talents in some other phase of electronics with a weather-eye on ideas he could bring back to geophysics when the exploration pendulum swung high again. One such hiatus in his geophysical activities occurred between 1929 and 1932 during which time, together with some associates, Rieber developed a method of recording sound on film which was not covered by the RCA and Western Electric patents. From this venture he brought the idea of reproducible recording back to seismic geophysics when he returned to this field in 1932, though he by no means limited his research and development to this idea.

In 1932, the reflection seismograph was still in its infancy but was well established and accepted in areas of good reflections. The majority of Rieber's early experiments with the reflection seismograph were located in areas of California known to this day as "trouble-spots".

After investigating the nature of reflections in some seismically complex areas of California, Rieber became convinced that interference of waves reaching the geophones was the principal cause of poor seismic results in such areas. He set about finding the cause of, and cure for these interferences, turning his back on the lucrative commercial field to be exploited by others using conventional equipment in areas where reflections could be more easily obtained. Around 1931, his wife Mary sought a divorce and sought alimony and custody of their two children.

=== Invention of the "Sonograph" ===
During the period from 1932 to 1935, Rieber investigated, and in some cases patented, methods of reducing surface disturbances at the shot and at the receiving point, methods of shortening wave transients, and methods of separating waves arriving from different directions. The method combining most of the results of his research he called the "Sonograph," which involved recording the seismogram traces as reproducible sound tracks and subsequently reproducing them in variably phased combinations and through various filters to reduce the various types of interference, particularly that due to waves arriving from different directions.

=== Professional affiliations ===
In 1934, Rieber joined the American Association of Petroleum Geologists and in 1936 the Society of Exploration Geophysicists. The next few years marked the height of his impact on the science of geophysics. He and his staff gave a series of papers on the Sonograph and on the complex geological conditions it was designed to evaluate. An effective speaker and a master of repartee, Rieber became a drawing card at any convention where he presented a paper, since his papers were always sufficiently controversial to elicit critical discussion. He introduced many novel features in his papers, which added to their interest and effectiveness. Some of these were: spark photographs of reflection and diffraction of sound waves in the air to simulate the action of seismic waves in the earth, animated drawings of wave travel in the earth; and, as late as 1947, stereoscopic X-ray slides, with polarized glasses for the audience, to demonstrate a parallelism between the seismic art and the X-ray art.

=== Discovery of "Geovision" ===
Rieber made an impact on the exploration industry during these years, but his new tool was not needed desperately enough for wide acceptance of his reproducible record method. In the last few years before his death in 1943, Rieber made one last effort to open the eyes of the exploration brotherhood to the value of his method. He conceived the idea of processing the reproducible seismograms very rapidly by electronic means and displaying a completely corrected cross-section on a cathode-ray screen, coining the name "Geovision" for the process.

Though Rieber did not live to see the complete development of "Geovision" and though his own organization could not, or at least did not, carry on his work after his death, this last effort was more timely. The publicity surrounding Geovision and the financial backing given Geovision by the managements of several oil companies undoubtedly helped those research geophysicists, who had for some time been carrying on a modest program of research on reproducible records and their processing, to go into high gear.

In a remarkably short period of time, the reproducible record "caught on." Undoubtedly a major factor in this revolution was the development in industry of reliable magnetic recording media such as tapes, discs, and strips and the simultaneous development of improved circuitry for magnetic recording and play-back, though at least one major company based its development on photographic film recording very similar to that employed by Rieber.

Today, original recording on galvanometer-type paper records is almost obsolete. Only the vast file of past seismograms remains as a valuable factor in present-day exploration as a reminder of the campaign Rieber continued to the end of his days. Ironically, we can now "reproduce" these old paper records electronically into more modern forms, and had this possibility been recognized in the early 1930s, Rieber might never have been granted his basic patent on the reproducible seismogram.

In addition to his work with devices for petroleum exploration for commercial use, he also aided in the development of military instruments and devices. These included a method to measure the muzzle velocity of shells, a magnetic means for detecting submarines, and sound ranging systems for locating enemy guns.

== Death in New York City ==
He moved to New York around 1940, shortly before WWII. He died at the age of 56 on March 12, 1948, at his residence-laboratory in New York City from a heart attack after suffering for years from a serious heart affliction His heart problems rarely diminished the zeal with which he pursued his professional goals. He had headed the Rieber Research Laboratory since 1941 He held 48 American and foreign patents, and had 27 pending patent applications. For many years he maintained his lab at 667 Howard Street in San Francisco. One of his earliest inventions was a device for maintaining massive X-ray examinations so as to prevent burns, which was implemented in many San Francisco Hospitals. He had also developed a method to help boat captains know their distance from shore using sound wave technology instrumentation that utilized echo location.
