= Ralph Johonnot =

American painter

- Born: July 28, 1880; Syracuse, New York, U.S.
- Died: November 19, 1940 (aged 60); Los Gatos, California, U.S.
- Education: Pratt Institute
- Years active: 1912–1940
- Spouse: Salome Lavinia Hopper (m. 1910–1940; death)
- Children: 1

Ralph Helm Johonnot (1880–1940) was an American artist, designer, and arts educator, he is known for his educational series on color and interior decoration. He created paintings and prints, within the Arts and Crafts movement of still life and landscapes, as well as creating decorative work with his wife Salome Lavinia Johonnot (née Hopper, 1883–1962). Together with Salome, they traveled to give educational lectures on the arts and created two private art schools, the Ralph Johonnot Studio in Richmond, California and Johonnot Summer School of Design and Hand Work in Pacific Grove, California. He was active in the arts throughout the state of California from approximately 1912–1940.

== Biography ==
Johonnot was born 28 July 1880 in Syracuse, New York to Mary Helm and Charles Johonnot. He was the middle child with two siblings, an older brother Earnest and a younger brother Carl. Johonnot attended Pratt Institute, he was a pupil of Arthur Wesley Dow. In 1906–1907, Ralph and his brother Carl traveled to England and France to study painting.

From 1909 until 1912, Johonnot taught classes in applied arts and decorative arts at Pratt Institute in Brooklyn, New York and was eventually promoted to the head of the Design Department.

By 1913, Johonnot and his wife moved to the San Francisco Bay Area and the same year he began lecturing at San Francisco Art Association (SFAA). Some of Johonnot's early students were artist Rudolph Schaeffer and William S. Rice. Other students of Johonnot's included Nell Choate Jones, Lydia Bush-Brown Head, Daisy Marguerite Hughes, Maude Kerns, Frank Ingerson, Marjorie Hodges Doolittle, Grif Teller, and many others. In the summers between 1914 and 1916 were spent hosting and teaching at Johonnot Summer School of Design and Hand Work in Pacific Grove, California. The family moved often between 1916 until 1927, between the cities of Pacific Grove and Carmel Highlands in Monterey County, and Pasadena in Southern California and various other places where they hosted lectures and classes on design but they maintained a residency in Pacific Grove while traveling. By the 1920s, Johonnot's traveling lectures started to be more focused on the study of color, as well as interior decoration of the home.

Johonnot died on 19 November 1940 in Los Gatos, California.

One of his students was Ellen Hadden.

== Personal life ==
Johonnot was married in 1910 in Pennsylvania to artist and designer Salome Lavinia Johonnot (née Hopper, 1883–1962). Together the couple would create decorative arts work together, occasionally working in interior design, mural design and painting, and fashion design. Salome had studied stitchery in England with May Morris, the daughter of William Morris. Together they had one child, Ralph Jr.

== Exhibitions ==
=== Solo exhibitions ===
- 1933 – Utah Art Studio, Salt Lake City, Utah
- 1937 – Monrovia, California

=== Select group exhibitions ===
- 1915 – The Ralph Johonnot Studio, Education Exhibits at the Panama-Pacific International Exposition (PPIE), San Francisco, California
- 1915 – Applied Arts by Southern California Craftsmen Exhibition (exhibited together with wife Salome), Panama–California Exposition, San Diego, California
- 1916 – Arts and Crafts Society’s First Annual Salon, Exposition Park, Los Angeles, California
- 1916 – National Society of Craftsmen (exhibited together with wife Salome), New York City, New York
- 1917 – Chicago Ceramics Art Association, Art Institute of Chicago, Chicago, Illinois
- 1922 – Artists' Cooperative Galleries, J.M. Gidding & Company Building, 726 Fifth Avenue, New York City, New York
- 1929 – Second Annual Decorative Arts Exhibition, Women’s Club of San Francisco, San Francisco, California
- 1930 – Elder's (Paul Elder Gallery), San Francisco, California
- 1930 – Palo Alto Art Club (now the Pacific Art League), Palo Alto Library, Palo Alto, California
- 1932 – (exhibition with wife Salome, Gene Kloss), Delphian Society, San Mateo Library, San Mateo, California
