= Winifred Smith Rieber =

American artist (1872–1963)

- Born: Winifred Smith; January 22, 1872; Carson City, Nevada, US
- Died: January 25, 1963 (aged 91); Sonoma, California, US
- Education: Boston School of Design

Winifred Smith Rieber (January 22, 1872 – January 25, 1963) was an American artist known for her portraits.

Rieber (née Smith) was born on January 22, 1872, in Carson City, Nevada. She studied at the California School of Design, and at the Boston School of Fine Arts.

Notable subjects she portrayed include William Carey Jones, Arthur Shipley, William James, George Herbert Palmer, and Josiah Royce. She also created portraits of Wesley Clair Mitchell and Franz Boas.

In 1890, she married the educator and philosopher Charles H. Rieber (1866–1948). The couple had several children including the geophysicist Frank Rieber and the artist and writer Dorothy Rieber Joralemon.

Rieber died on January 25, 1963, aged 91, in Sonoma, California.
