= Rudolph Schaeffer =

American artist (1886–1988)

- Born: June 26, 1886; Clare, Michigan, U.S.
- Died: March 5, 1988 (aged 101); San Francisco, California, U.S.
- Known for: Rudolph Schaeffer School of Design
- Movement: Arts and Crafts movement

Rudolph Frederick Schaeffer (June 26, 1886 – March 5, 1988) an American arts educator and artist connected to the Arts and Crafts movement. He was the founder of the Rudolph Schaeffer School of Design, a school that was based in San Francisco and produced designers, architects, interior decorators, teachers and colorists for more than 50 years. He was one of many pioneers in the study of color field, and has been credited with establishing the city of San Francisco as an International design center.

== Early life ==
Born on June 26, 1886, in Clare, Michigan, to Mary Hirzel and German immigrant and miller, Julius Schaeffer. He attended the Thomas Normal Training School in Detroit, after finishing high school. The school specialized in art, music and manual arts.

== Career ==
By 1910 he moved to California and started teaching at the Throop Polytechnic Elementary School in Pasadena, working with Ernest A. Batchelder. In 1914 the United States Commission of Education selected Schaeffer as one of twenty five American educators to move to Munich to learn more about the study of color, design, and craft and how it was being taught in public, industrial, and trade schools. During his time in Munich, World War I broke out and caused delays in his return to the United States due to a shortage of boats and family issues.

Upon his return in 1915 he found work teaching at the School of California Arts and Crafts (now called California College of the Arts or CCA) with Fredrick Meyer. And it was here at CCA he developed new curriculum to teach color theory for a class called "Design and Color", utilizing techniques he learned with Ralph Johonnot in Europe. In 1917, he started teaching at California School of Fine Arts (now called San Francisco Art Institute) and continued teaching his class, "Design and Color".

In 1924, he opened his own art school in San Francisco's Chinatown, originally named the Rudolph Schaeffer School of Rhythmo-Chromatic Design. The school later changed names and locations over the years. Schaeffer was greatly influenced by Japanese aesthetics, philosophy and design and in the 1920s he was teaching these principals.

== Death ==
He died March 5, 1988, in his home in San Francisco at age 101.
