= Hitchhiker (disambiguation) =

A hitchhiker is someone who goes hitchhiking.

Hitchhiker, The Hitchhiker or The Hitch-Hiker may also refer to:

== Film and television ==
- The Hitch-Hiker, a 1953 film noir directed by Ida Lupino
- The Hitchhiker (film), a 2007 low-budget horror film
- "The Hitchhiker", a segment from the 1987 horror film Creepshow 2
- The Hitchhiker (TV series), a mystery anthology series that aired from 1983 to 1987
- "The Hitchhiker" (Cold Case), a 2003 television episode
- "The Hitch-Hiker" (The Twilight Zone), a 1960 television episode
- "The Hitchhikers" (Diff'rent Strokes), a 1984 television episode

== Music ==
- Hitchhiker (album), by Neil Young, recorded in 1976 and released in 2017, and its title track
- Hitchhiker (EP), an EP by JO1
- "Hitchhiker", a song by Pearl Jam from the 2003 album Lost Dogs
- "Hitchhiker", a song by Neil Young from the 2010 album Le Noise (re-released on the eponymous 2017 album)
- "Hitchhiker", a song by Demi Lovato from the 2017 album Tell Me You Love Me
- "Hitch Hiker", a 1966 song by Gary Young
- "Hitchhiker", a song by Macabre from the 2000 album Dahmer
- "Hitchhiker", a song by John Denver from the 1976 album Spirit
- "Hitchhiker", a song by Teitur Lassen from the 2006 album Stay Under the Stars
- "Hitchhiker", a comedy track by Steven Wright from the 2007 album I Still Have a Pony
- "Hitch Hike" (song), by Marvin Gaye, 1962
  - Hitch hike (dance), a dance craze started by the song

== Other uses ==
- The Hitch-Hiker (radio play), a story by Lucille Fletcher first presented on The Orson Welles Show in 1941
- "The Hitch-Hiker" (short story), a 1977 short story by Roald Dahl featured in The Wonderful Story of Henry Sugar and Six More
- Hitchhiker Program, a discontinued NASA program

== See also ==
- Hitchhike (disambiguation)
- The Hitcher (disambiguation)
- The Hitchhiker's Guide to the Galaxy
