= Hitchhike (disambiguation) =

Hitchhike means to go hitchhiking.

Hitchhike or Hitch-Hike may also refer to:

== Dance and music ==
- Hitch hike (dance), a dance move
- "Hitch Hike" (song), a 1963 song by Marvin Gaye
- Hitchhike Records, a record label based in Honolulu, Hawaii

== Film ==
- Hitch-Hike (film), a 1977 Italian crime film
- Hitchhike!, a 1974 made-for-TV movie starring Cloris Leachman
- Hitch Hike, a 2012 New Zealand short film by filmmaker Matthew J. Saville

== See also ==
- Hitchhiker (disambiguation)
- The Hitcher (disambiguation)
