= Economics of defense =

Subfield of economics

The economics of defense or defense economics is a subfield of economics, an application of the economic theory to the issues of military defense. It is a relatively new field. An early specialized work in the field is the RAND Corporation report The Economics of Defense in the Nuclear Age by Charles J. Hitch and Roland McKean. It is an economic field that studies the management of government budget and its expenditure during mainly war times, but also during peace times, and its consequences on economic growth. It thus uses macroeconomic and microeconomic tools such as game theory, comparative statistics, growth theory and econometrics. It has strong ties to other subfields of economics such as public finance, economics of industrial organization, international economics, labour economics and growth economics.

== History ==
The roots of the science can be tracked back to the 1920s when The Political Economy of War by Arthur Cecil Pigou was originally published. A major step forward can be then accredited to Charles J. Hitch and Roland McKean and their work The Economics of Defense in the Nuclear Age from 1960. A great contribution to the subject came in 1975 when the British economist G. Kennedy published his book The Economics of Defence. However, importance of the field grew especially in the late 1980s and early 1990s due to political instability caused by the breakup of the Soviet Union and liberation of Eastern Europe. This resulted in the publication of a complex overview of the current state of the field in 1995 from Todd Sandler and Keith Hartley called The Handbook of Defense Economics.

While the science as such started developing in the 20th century, many of its topics can be found long before then. For example, the first written set of laws called the Code of Hammurabi from the 18th century BC can be considered one of the earliest works dealing with problems and questions of the economics of defense. Similarly, economic aspects of war and military operations are broken down in a great detail in Sun Tzu's The Art of War from the 5th century BC. During the Middle Ages, political institutions emerged and a great step forward was made in military with the invention of devices using gunpowder.

Generally, developments in defense economics reflect current affairs. During the Cold War, the main topics included superpower arms races, establishment of strong and lasting alliances and nuclear weapon research. Afterwards, the focus shifted to conversion opportunities, disarmament and the peace dividend availability. And at the beginning of the new millennium, the research shifted its attention to an increasing number of regional and ethnic conflicts (Africa, Bosnia, Kosovo, Afghanistan, Iraq), international terrorist threats (terrorist attacks on the USA) and weapons of mass destruction. Besides that, much work was dedicated to NATO, the European Union and other alliances that accepted new members and continued with developing new missions, rules and international organizations, an example being the European Security and Defence Policy, which involved the introduction of the European Defence Equipment Market and the European Defence Technological and Industrial Base.

== Principles ==
The field revolves around finding the optimal resource allocation among defense and other functions of the government While the primal goal is to find the optimal size of the defense budget with respect to sizes of other budgets managed by the public body, the field also studies the optimization of allocation among specific missions and outputs such as arms control, disarmament, civil defense, sealift, arms conversion, mobilization bases, or weaponry composition. At the same time, different ways these goals can be achieved are analyzed on lower levels. These consist of finding the optimal choice between alternative logistic arrangements, rifles, specialized equipment, contract provisions, base locations and so on. Since the defense management of a country consists of choosing between many substitutes, an analysis of costs and benefits of various options is vital.

Economizing in the economics of defense represents the principle of reallocating available scarce resources such that an output of the greatest possible value is produced. This can be achieved in two ways:

- Improvement of the economic calculus
- Improvement of the institutional arrangements that shape defense choices

These two are closely intertwined since finding an optimal choice is worthless if institutions lead decision-makers to different choices, just as functioning institutions do not provide much help if an optimal choice is not found. An absence of a widely accepted tool to calculate the change in value when choosing among various options represents a major difficulty in the economics of defense because it makes the identification of the optimal allocation practically impossible. Differences of opinions on security and threat protection topics are common between people.

Although the economics of defense mainly studies microeconomic topics, which involve allocation optimization and optimal choice identification, it also looks into several macroeconomic topics, which focus on the impact of defense expenditures on various macroeconomic variables such as economic growth, gross domestic product and employment. One branch of defense economics takes an institutional approach to analyze defense resource allocations. This approach aims to maximize the effectiveness and the efficiency of military performance, and provide measures targeted at improving the management of armies. This area also studies critical infrastructures such as road, rail, water, health, electricity, and cybersecurity networks, to improve their resilience against intentional attacks.

In terms of economics, a distinctive feature of the defense is that it is public goods, and as such it is both non-excludable and non-rivalrous. As such, it may suffer the so-called "free rider problem".

== General economic theories of military spending ==
=== The Neoclassical theory ===
In the Neoclassical theory, military spending can be considered as a public good. The government acts as a rational agent, trying to maximise the welfare of society by taking into account the security benefits, the opportunity costs and the trade-off between military and civil spending. This theory is often criticized because of its unrealistic assumptions, for example its assumption about the rational agent theory.

The best known neoclassical model is the one of Feder-Ram, developed by Biswas and Ram in 1986, and adapted by Feder a few years later. It mainly focuses on the effects of military spending on economic growth of developing countries through the export effect, thanks to a cross-country study. This model is criticized because military spending represents one single explanatory variable in a simple linear regression.

=== The Keynesian theory ===
In the Keynesian theory, in case of ineffective aggregate demand, military spending increases the output of a country (see also Military keynesianism). According to Faini et al. (1984), military spending can increase growth, through an increase of capacity utilization, investment and profits. This theory is criticized because it is mainly focussed on the demand side and not enough on the supply and production side.

=== The Marxist theory ===
The Marxist theory considers military spending as necessary for the development of the Military-industrial complex in class struggle and capitalism. According to Baran and Paul Sweezy (1966), this type of government spending enable to control wages and profits in case of underconsumption.

== United States ==
Typically, the United States uses a combination of hard power (military force), soft power (diplomacy and foreign assistance) and domestic counterterrorism (homeland security). During the early 2000s, the United States' national defense budget rose to about $800 billion per year. In recent years, it has dropped to $600 billion annually, which is still a large figure relative to Cold War averages and other countries' budgets.

== Military defense spending tables ==
Further information: List of countries with highest military expenditures

Military spending, top 25 countries by % GDP, 2024
Country	% GDP spent on military
Ukraine	34.5
Israel	8.8
Algeria	8.0
Saudi Arabia	7.3
Russia	7.1
Myanmar	6.8
Oman	5.6
Armenia	5.5
Azerbaijan	5.0
Kuwait	4.8
Jordan	4.8
Burkina Faso	4.7
Mali	4.2
Poland	4.2
Burundi	3.8
Brunei	3.6
Morocco	3.5
United States	3.4
Estonia	3.4
Colombia	3.4
Latvia	3.3
Greece	3.1
Lithuania	3.1
Chad	3.0
Kyrgyzstan	3.0

Military spending, top 25 countries by PPP, 2024
Country	$billions spent on military
United States	997
China	567
Russia	401
India	308
Ukraine	183
South Korea	96
Germany	99
Japan	91
France	91
United Kingdom	86
Brazil	64
Poland	62
Italy	60
Turkey	59
Indonesia	47
Colombia	43
Mexico	40
Spain	39
Australia	31
Canada	31
Netherlands	21
Philippines	21
Romania	21
Greece	17
Malaysia	14

== North Atlantic Treaty Organization ==
At the Prague Summit 2002, with the 9/11 terror attack not in the distant past and the enlargement of NATO into Eastern Europe (Bulgaria, Estonia, Latvia, Lithuania, Romania, Slovakia and Slovenia), member states agreed the need to strengthen the alliance's ability to deal with a wide range of new threats. After this summit, member countries committed to establishing a minimum level of acceptable defense spending of 2% of annual GDP, which has since been achieved and increased to a minimum of 5%.

After defense spending cuts during the Global Recession, members of the alliance agreed at the Wales Summit 2014 that those that did not already meet the defense spending guidelines to stop cuts to associate budget, gradually increase spending, and aim to move towards the goal within a decade. Thereafter, spending among European allies and Canada increase their defense spending from 2016 to 2017 by approximately 4.87 percent. There has a significant increase in the defence spending of some Eastern Europe countries as they see a threat from Russia after the annexation of Crimea, this significant threat has seen an increase in deployment to defence equipment to this region from the likes of the United Kingdom and the United States of America. Although there has been a significant increase in the defence expenditure in some members of the alliance there are a number of countries who are very far away from reaching the 2 percent defence expenditure target.

At the Wales Summit, it was also agreed that Allies who currently spend less than 20% of their annual defense spending on major new equipment, including related Research & Development, will aim, within a decade, to increase their annual investments to 20% or more of total defense expenditures. As of 2026, all 32 NATO member countries have reached or exceeded this historic target of spending 2% of their GDP on defense. Following years of lagging defense budgets, straggling alliance members (such as Canada, Spain, Belgium, and Portugal) increased their budgets to exactly the 2% threshold to fulfill the alliance's minimum requirement.

At the 2025 NATO Summit in The Hague, NATO member states made a commitment to investing 5% of their GDP annually on core defence requirements and defence- and security-related spending by 2035. The agreement included the allocation of at least 3.5% of GDP annually based on the agreed definition of NATO defence expenditure by 2035 to resource core defence requirements and the decision to meet the NATO Capability Targets. Allies agreed to submit annual plans showing a credible, incremental path to reach this goal, and will account for up to 1.5% of GDP annually to inter alia protect critical infrastructure, defend networks, ensure civil preparedness and resilience, innovate, and strengthen the defence industrial base.

In recent times, American presidents have become critical of the defense spending of their European NATO allies. Donald Trump, then a presidential candidate and now 47th President of the US, described NATO as "obsolete" but has since withdrawn these claims, he continued to argue that the allies must spend more on their defense. The ex-president Barack Obama was concerned that not all NATO members were "chipping in" toward the cost of a collective defense and deterrent against Russia at the time of Ukrainian-Russian conflict. According to the 2017 NATO Annual Report on Defence Expenditure, the United States of America spends almost twice the amount of US Dollars on Defence than their European and Canadian colleagues. Even with the significant difference in the expenditure NATO allies account for 70 percent of the global total military expenses.

== See also ==
- War finance
- Economic militarism

== Literature ==
- Keupp, Marcus Matthias (2021). Defense economics: An institutional perspective. Springer. ISBN 978-3-030-73815-0.
- Hitch, Charles J.; McKean, Roland N. (1960). The Economics of Defense in the Nuclear Age. Harvard University Press. ISBN 978-0-674-86588-4.
- Hartley, Keith; Sandler, Todd (Ed.) (1995). Handbook in Defense Economics, Defense Economics in the post-cold war era. Volume 1. North Holland. ISBN 978-0-444-81887-4.
- Hartley, Keith; Sandler, Todd (Ed.) (2007). Handbook in Defense Economics, Defense in a globalized World. Volume 2. North Holland. ISBN 978-0-444-51910-8.
