= Hitch =

Hitch may refer to:

== People ==
- Hitch (surname)
- nickname of director Alfred Hitchcock (1899–1980)
- nickname of writer Christopher Hitchens (1949–2011)

== Other uses ==
- Hitch (knot), a knot used to attach a rope to a fixed object
- Tow hitch, a construction on a truck or car to attach a trailer
- Hitches, fishes in the genus Lavinia including Lavinia exilicauda
- Hitch (route), a pattern run by a receiver in American football
- Hitch (film), a 2005 comedy film starring Will Smith
- Hitch (album), a 2016 album by The Joy Formidable
- Healthcare Interoperability Testing and Conformance Harmonisation, a 2010–2011 European Institute for Health Records project

== See also ==
- Hitching (disambiguation)
- The Hitcher (disambiguation)
