= Roland McKean =

American economist

Roland N. McKean
- Born: October 30, 1917; Mulberry Grove, Illinois, US
- Died: April 15, 1993 (aged 75); Chapel Hill, North Carolina, US

Academic background
- Education: University of Chicago

Roland Neely McKean (October 30, 1917 – April 15, 1993) is an American economist. He received his A.B. and Ph.D. degrees in economics from the University of Chicago. From 1951 to 1963, he was a research economist at the RAND Corporation, where he and Charles J. Hitch developed the Planning, Programming, and Budgeting System (PPBS), which was first implemented by the U.S. Department of Defense in 1961. In 1965, President Lyndon B. Johnson extended adoption of PPBS to all executive departments.

He was a professor of economics at the University of California, Los Angeles until 1968, and was the Paul Goodloe Macintire professor of economics at the University of Virginia until his retirement in 1988.

His books include Efficiency in Government Through Systems Analysis, Economics of Defense in the Nuclear Age (with Charles J. Hitch), and Teacher Shortages and Salary Schedules (with Joseph A. Kershaw).
