= Militarism =

National reliance on a strong military

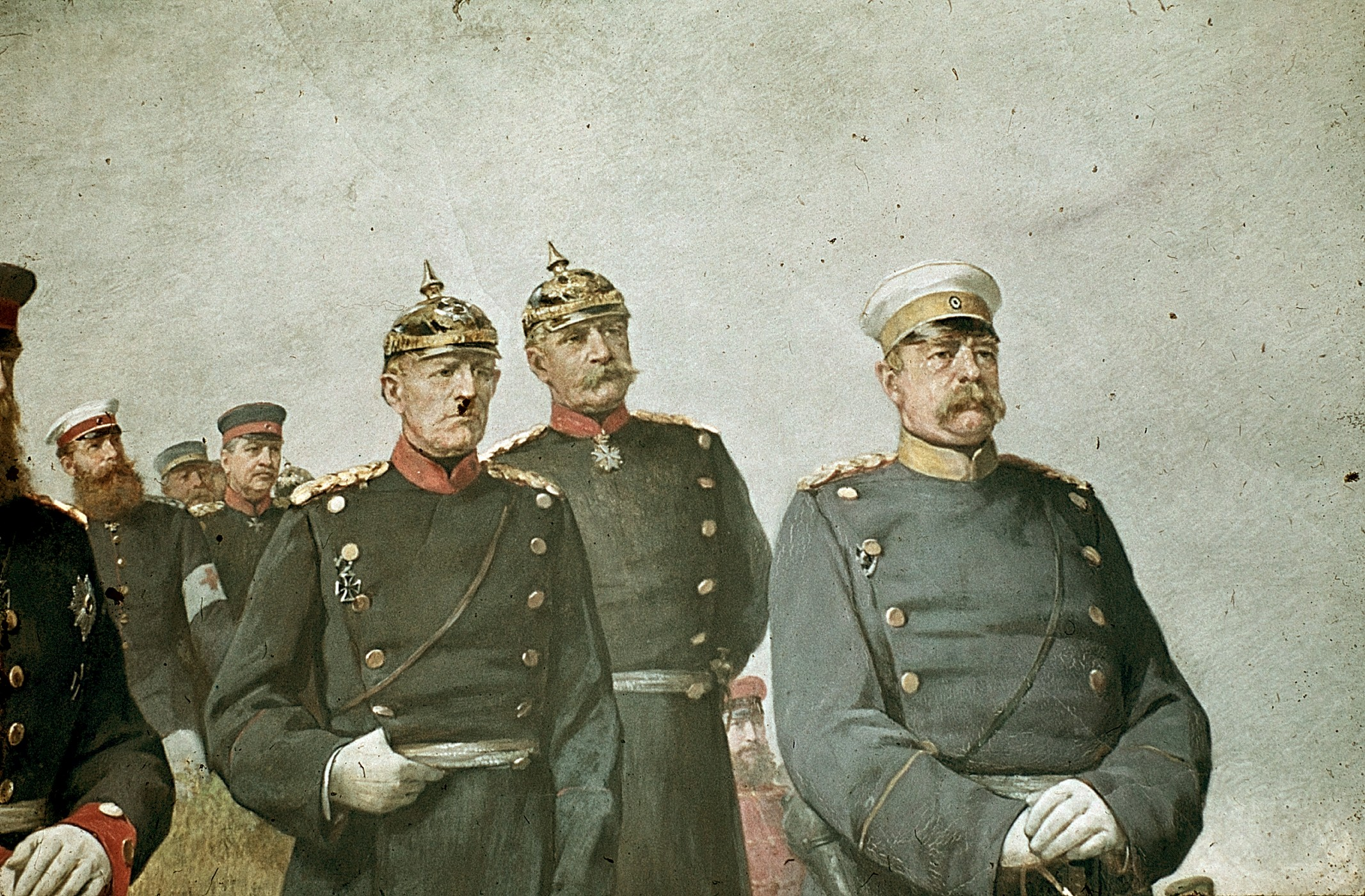
Prussian (and later German) Chancellor Otto von Bismarck, right, with General Helmuth von Moltke the Elder, left, and General Albrecht von Roon, centre. Although Bismarck was a civilian politician and not a military officer, he wore a military uniform as part of the Prussian militarist culture of the time. From a painting by Carl Steffeck.

Militarism is the belief or the desire of a government or a people that a state should maintain a strong military capability and to use it aggressively to expand national interests and/or values. It may also imply the glorification of the ideals of a professional military class and the "predominance of the armed forces in the administration or policy of the state."

== By nation ==
=== Germany ===
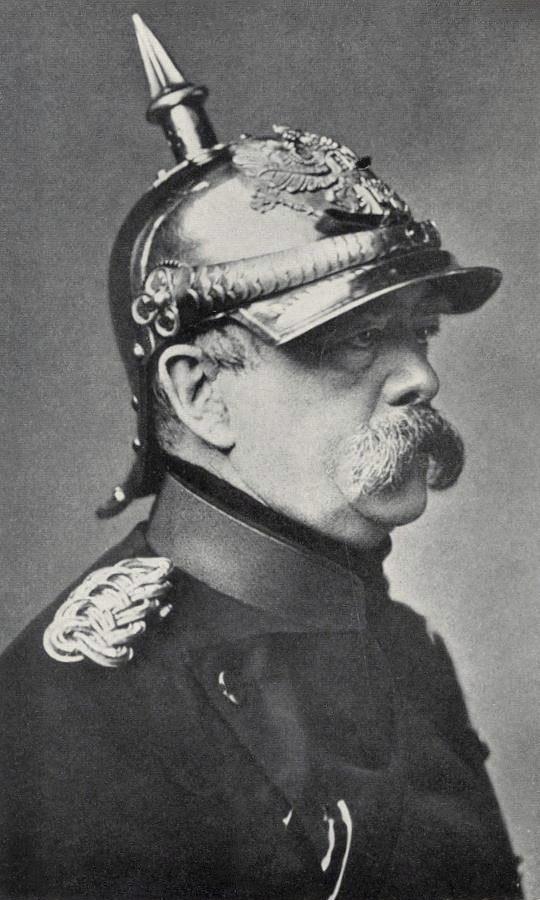
Otto von Bismarck, a civilian, wearing a cuirassier officer's metal Pickelhaube

The roots of German militarism can be found in 18th- and 19th-century Prussia and the subsequent unification of Germany under Prussian leadership. However, Hans Rosenberg sees its origin already in the Teutonic Order and its colonization of Prussia during the late Middle Ages, when mercenaries from the Holy Roman Empire were granted lands by the Order and gradually formed a new landed militarist Prussian nobility, from which the Junker nobility would later evolve.

During the 17th-century reign of the "Great Elector" Frederick William, Elector of Brandenburg, Brandenburg-Prussia increased its military to 40,000 men and began an effective military administration overseen by the General War Commissariat. In order to bolster his power both in interior and foreign matters, so-called Soldatenkönig ("soldier king") Frederick William I of Prussia started his large-scale military reforms in 1713, thus beginning the country's tradition of a high military budget by increasing the annual military spending to 73% of the entire annual budget of Prussia. By the time of his death in 1740, the Prussian Army had grown into a standing army of 83,000 men, one of the largest in Europe, at a time when the entire Prussian populace made up 2.5 million people. Prussian military writer Georg Henirich von Berenhorst would later write in hindsight that ever since the reign of the soldier king, Prussia always remained "not a country with an army, but an army with a country" (a quote often misattributed to Voltaire and Honoré Gabriel Riqueti, comte de Mirabeau).

After Napoleon Bonaparte defeated Prussia in 1806, one of the conditions of peace was that Prussia should reduce its army to no more than 42,000 men. Since the time of Frederick The Great, however, Prussia practiced the Kruemper System, formed by dismissing a number of trained men at regular intervals and replacing them with raw recruits, thereby passing a large number of men through the ranks. The officers of the army were drawn almost entirely from among the land-owning nobility. The result was that there was gradually built up a large class of professional officers on the one hand, and a much larger class, the rank and file of the army, on the other. These enlisted men had become conditioned to obey implicitly all the commands of the officers, creating a class-based culture of deference.

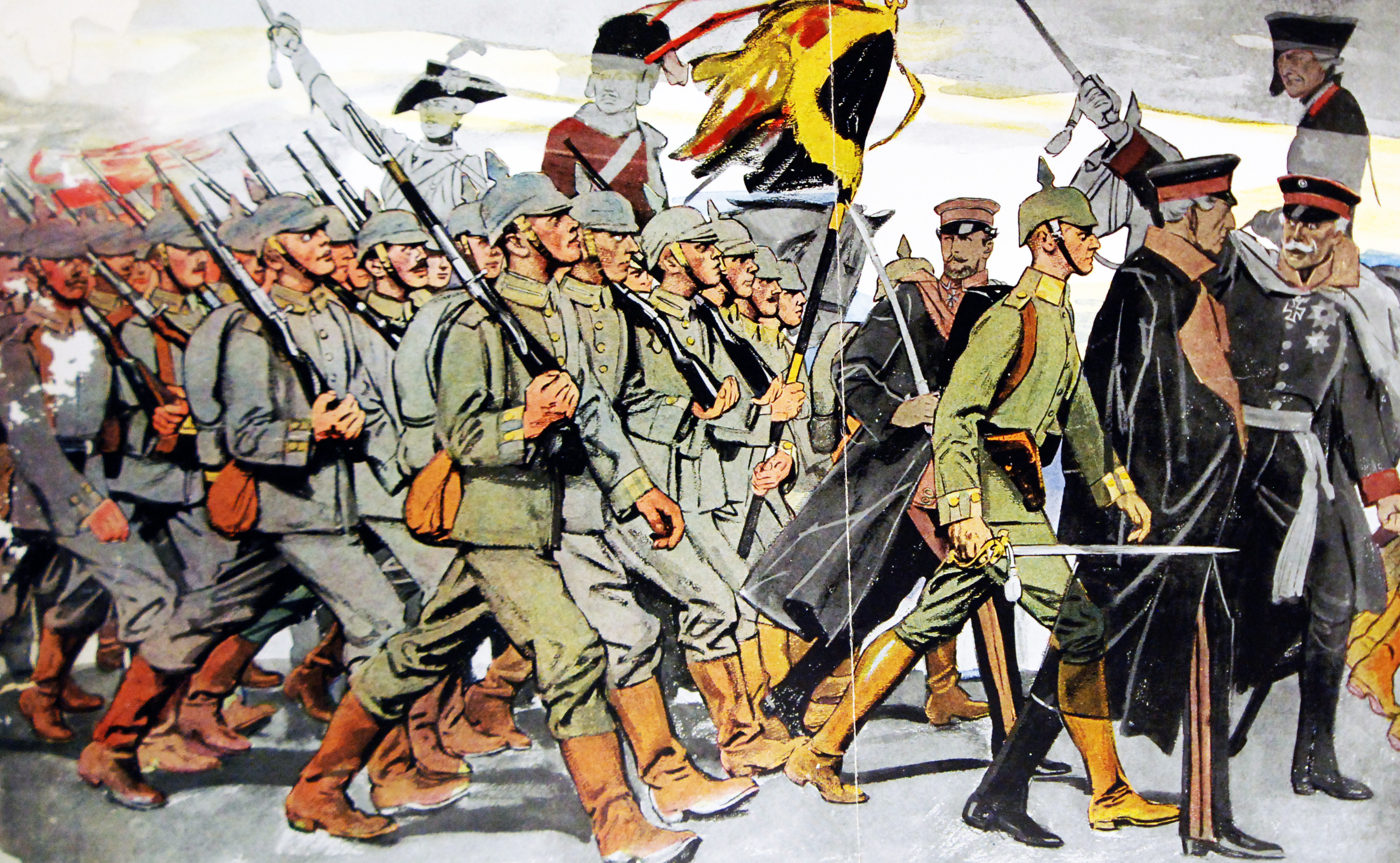
World War I propaganda of Germany

This system led to several consequences. Since the officer class also furnished most of the officials for the civil administration of the country, the interests of the army came to be considered as identical to the interests of the country as a whole. In the 1900s militant monarchism was highly developed, garnering a fan-base in the United States of America. Wilhelm II had his palace guard dress in 37 different uniforms, including one that resampled the accessory worn by Frederick the Great. Wilhelm II appeared deluded about his physical disability, including his withered arm. He had sacked Otto von Bismarck in 1890 and obtained near absolute power but had to accept Erich Ludendorff as chief policy maker. Army general Ludendorff was appointed director of the Reich in 1917 and exercised the constitutional powers of Wilhelm II.

Militarism in Germany continued after World War I and the fall of the German monarchy in the German Revolution of 1918–1919, in spite of Allied attempts to crush German militarism by means of the Treaty of Versailles, as the Allies saw Prussian and German militarism as one of the major causes of the Great War. During the period of the Weimar Republic (1918–1933), the 1920 Kapp Putsch, an attempted coup d'état against the republican government, was launched by disaffected members of the armed forces. After this event, some of the more radical militarists and nationalists were submerged in grief and despair into the NSDAP party of Adolf Hitler, while more moderate elements of militarism declined and remained affiliated with the German National People's Party (DNVP) instead.

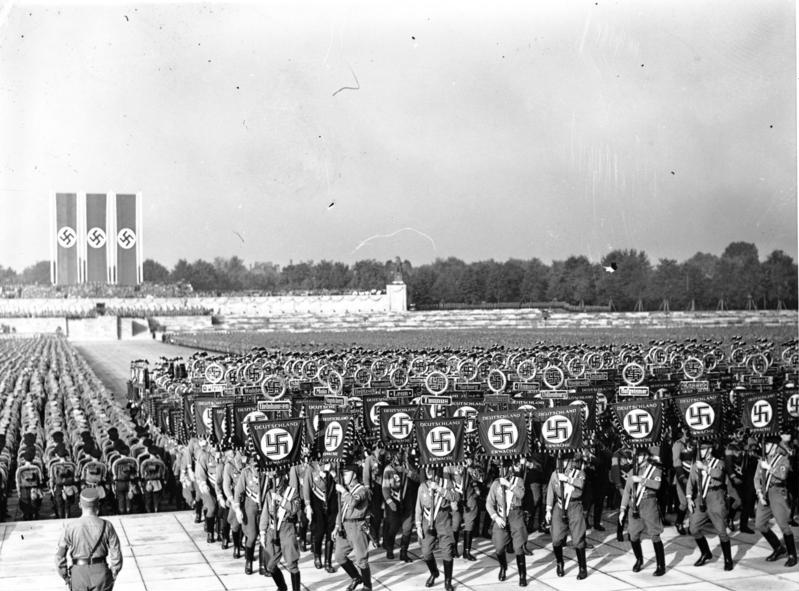
Militarism in Nazi Germany

Throughout its entire 14-year existence, the Weimar Republic remained under threat of militaristic nationalism, as many Germans felt the Treaty of Versailles humiliated their militaristic culture. The Weimar years saw large-scale right-wing militarist and paramilitary mass organizations such as Der Stahlhelm as well as militias such as the Freikorps, which was banned in 1921. In the same year, the Reichswehr set up the Black Reichswehr, a secret reserve of trained soldiers networked within its units organised as "labour battalions" (Arbeitskommandos) to circumvent the Treaty of Versailles' 100,000 man limit on the German army.; it was dissolved in 1923. Many members of the Freikorps and the Black Reichswehr went on to join the Sturmabteilung (SA), the paramilitary branch of the Nazi party. All of these were responsible for the political violence of so-called Feme murders and an overall atmosphere of lingering civil war during the Weimar period. During the Weimar era, mathematician and political writer Emil Julius Gumbel published in-depth analyses of the militarist paramilitary violence characterizing German public life as well as the state's lenient to sympathetic reaction to it if the violence was committed by the political right.

Nazi Germany was a strongly militarist state; after its defeat in 1945, militarism in German culture was dramatically reduced as a backlash against the Nazi period, and the Allied Control Council and later the Allied High Commission oversaw a program of attempted fundamental re-education of the German people at large in order to put a stop to German militarism once and for all.

The Federal Republic of Germany today maintains a large, modern military and has one of the highest defence budgets in the world; at 1.3 percent of Germany's GDP, it is, in 2019, similar in cash terms to those of the United Kingdom, France and Japan, at around US$50bn.

=== India ===
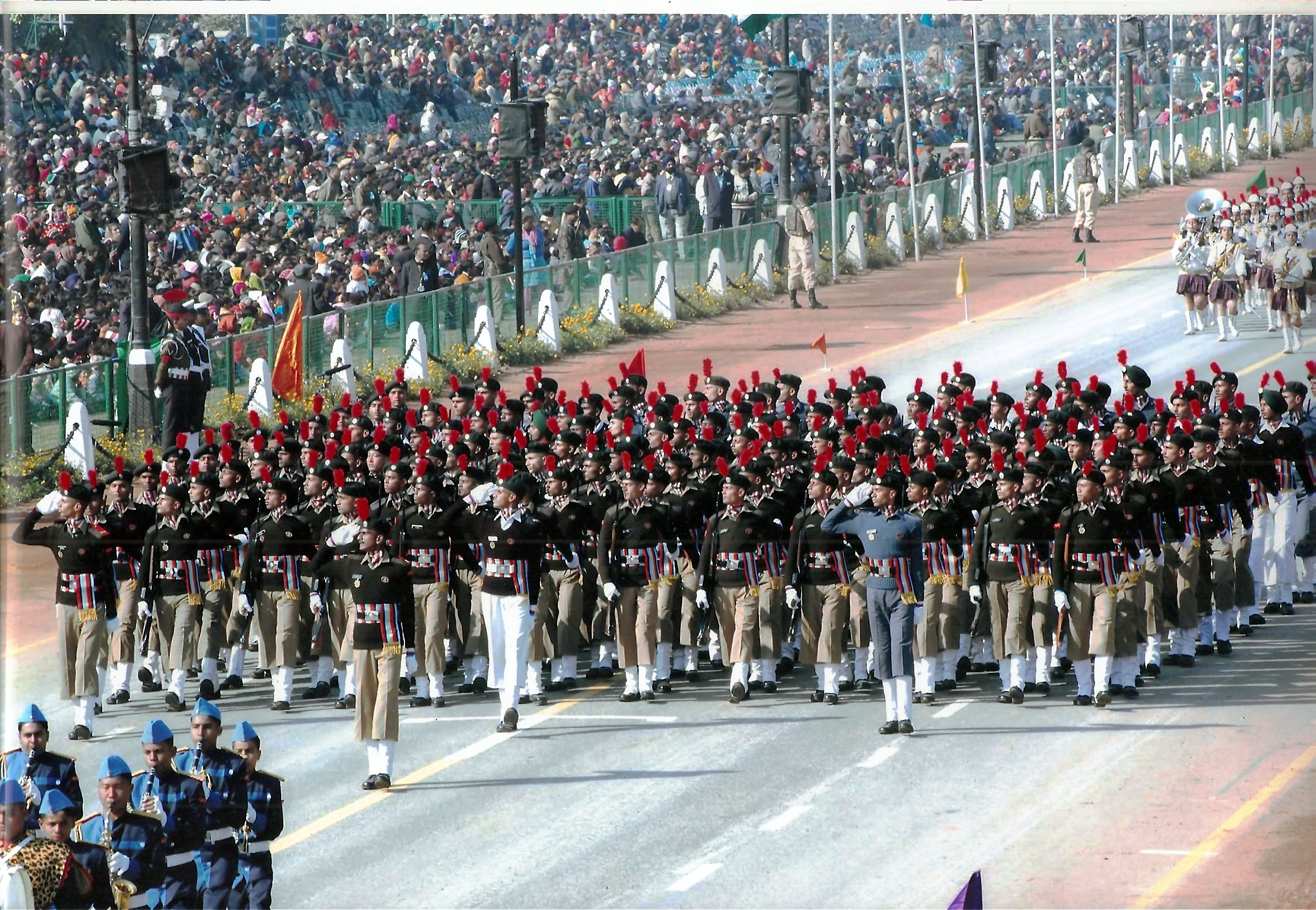
Military parade in India

After India gained independence in 1947, tensions with neighbouring Pakistan over the Kashmir dispute and other issues led the Indian government to emphasize military preparedness (see also the political integration of India). After the Sino-Indian War in 1962, India dramatically expanded its military which helped India win the Indo-Pakistani War of 1971. India became the third Asian country in the world to possess nuclear weapons, culminating in the tests of 1998. The Kashmiri insurgency and recent events including the Kargil War against Pakistan, assured that the Indian government remained committed to military expansion. The disputed Jammu and Kashmir territory in India is regarded as one of the world’s most militarized places.

In recent years, the Indian government has increased the military expenditure of the 1.4 million-strong military across all branches and embarked on a rapid modernization program.

=== Japan ===
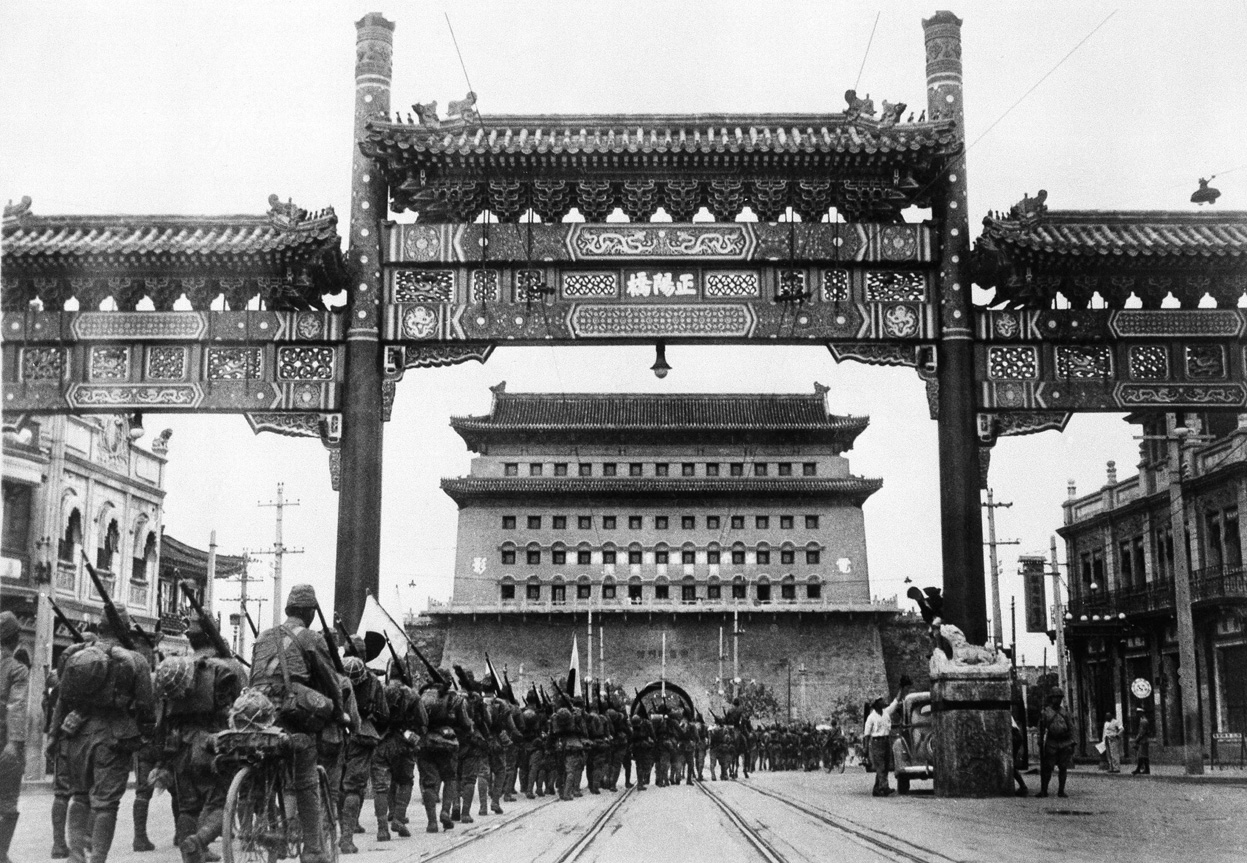
Japanese march into Zhengyangmen of Beijing after capturing the city in July 1937.

In parallel with 20th-century German militarism, Japanese militarism began with a series of events by which the military gained prominence in dictating Japan's affairs. This was evident in 15th-century Japan's Sengoku period or Age of Warring States, where powerful samurai warlords (daimyōs) played a significant role in Japanese politics. Japan's militarism is deeply rooted in the ancient samurai tradition, centuries before Japan's modernization. Even though a militarist philosophy was intrinsic to the shogunates, a nationalist style of militarism developed after the Meiji Restoration, which restored the Emperor to power and began the Empire of Japan. It is exemplified by the 1882 Imperial Rescript to Soldiers and Sailors, which called for all members of the armed forces to have an absolute personal loyalty to the Emperor.

In the 20th century (approximately in the 1920s), two factors contributed both to the power of the military and chaos within its ranks. One was the "Military Ministers to be Active-Duty Officers Law", which required the Imperial Japanese Army (IJA) and Imperial Japanese Navy (IJN) to agree to the Ministry of Army position in the Cabinet. This essentially gave the military veto power over the formation of any Cabinet in the ostensibly parliamentary country. Another factor was gekokujō, or institutionalized disobedience by junior officers. It was not uncommon for radical junior officers to press their goals, to the extent of assassinating their seniors. In 1936, this phenomenon resulted in the February 26 Incident, in which junior officers attempted a coup d'état and killed leading members of the Japanese government. The rebellion enraged Emperor Hirohito and he ordered its suppression, which was successfully carried out by loyal members of the military.

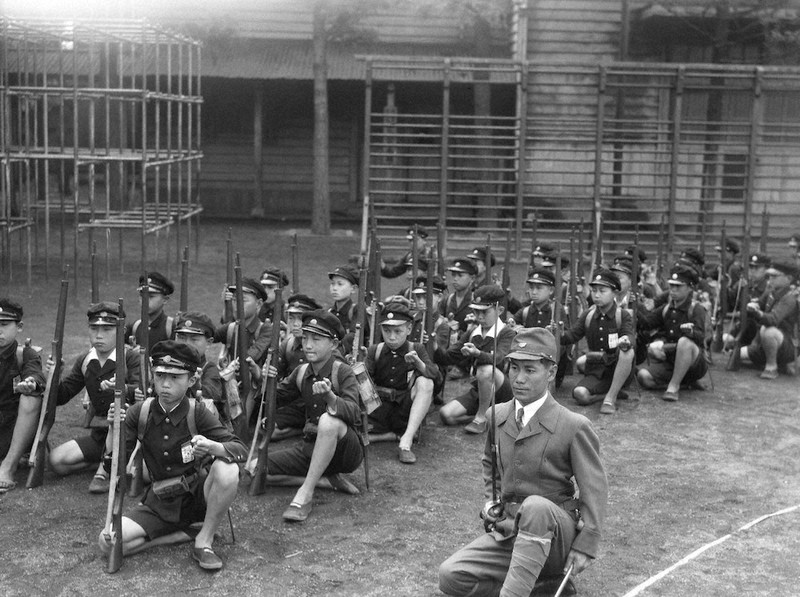
Elementary school students are drilled in Tokyo, May 1942.

In the 1930s, the Great Depression damaged Japan's economy and gave radical elements within the Japanese military the chance to realize their ambitions of conquering all of Asia. In 1931, the Kwantung Army (a Japanese military force stationed in Manchuria) staged the Mukden Incident, which sparked the Invasion of Manchuria and its transformation into the Japanese puppet state of Manchukuo. Six years later, the Marco Polo Bridge Incident outside Peking sparked the Second Sino-Japanese War (1937–1945). Japanese troops streamed into China, conquering Peking, Shanghai, and the national capital of Nanking; the last conquest was followed by the Nanking Massacre. In 1940, Japan entered into an alliance with Nazi Germany and Fascist Italy, two similarly militaristic states in Europe, and advanced out of China and into Southeast Asia. The following year, Japan attacked Pearl Harbor to prevent the intervention of the United States, which had banned oil sales to Japan in response to the Second Sino-Japanese War and the ensuing invasion of Indochina.

In 1945, Japan surrendered to the Allied Powers, beginning the Occupation of Japan and the purging of all militarist influences from Japanese society and politics. In 1947, the new Constitution of Japan supplanted the Meiji Constitution as the fundamental law of the country, replacing the rule of the Emperor with parliamentary government. With this event, the Empire of Japan officially came to an end and the modern State of Japan was founded.

=== North Korea ===
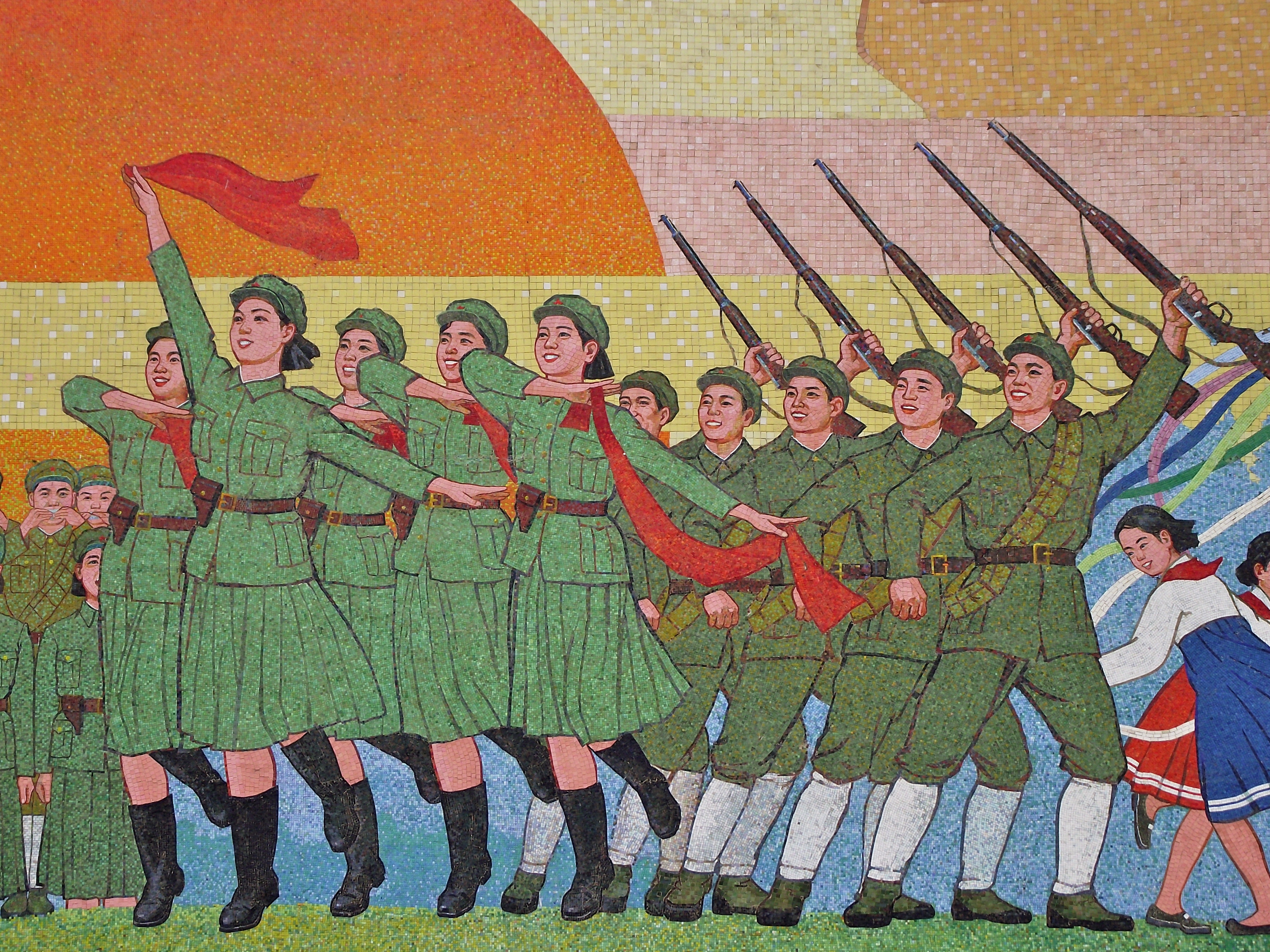
North Korean propaganda mural

Sŏn'gun (often transliterated "songun"), North Korea's "Military First" policy, regards military power as the highest priority of the country. This has escalated so much in the DPRK that one in five people serves in the armed forces, and the military has become one of the largest in the world.

Songun elevates the Korean People's Armed Forces within North Korea as an organization and as a state function, granting it the primary position in the North Korean government and society. The principle guides domestic policy and international interactions. It provides the framework of the government, designating the military as the "supreme repository of power". It also facilitates the militarization of non-military sectors by emphasizing the unity of the military and the people by spreading military culture among the masses. The North Korean government grants the Korean People's Army as the highest priority in the economy and in resource-allocation, and positions it as the model for society to emulate. Songun is also the ideological concept behind a shift in policies (since the death of Kim Il Sung in 1994) which emphasize the people's military over all other aspects of state and the interests of the military comes first before the masses (workers).

=== Philippines ===
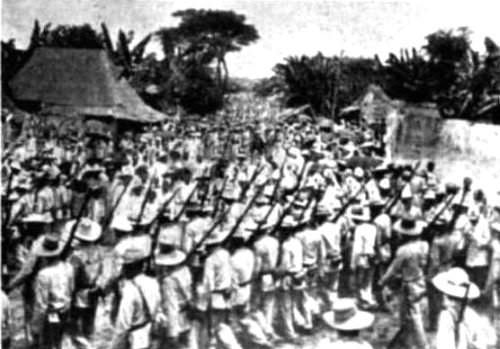
Filipino soldiers at Malolos, Bulacan, c. 1899

During the pre-colonial era, the Filipino people had their own forces, divided between the islands which each had its own ruler. They were called Sandig (Guards), Kawal (Knights) these also served as the police and watchers on the land, coastlines and seas. Another notable example is the Maharlika class, that consists of free, and battle-hardened men that were expected to serve their local chieftains, and in exchange, the exemption from paying tribute, or taxes. In 1521, the Visayan king of Mactan Lapu-Lapu of Cebu, organized the first recorded military action against the Spanish colonizers, in the Battle of Mactan.

During the late 19th century, Filipino militarism emerged from the struggle for independence against Spanish colonial rule. In 1892, Andrés Bonifacio and five others founded the Katipunan, a revolutionary society that sought independence through armed resistance following the failure of peaceful reform and propaganda movements such as La Liga Filipina.

The revolution began with the Sigaw sa Pugad Lawin on the 23rd of August, 1896. This marked the beginning of open resistance against Spanish colonial rule in the islands. Originally, the Filipino armies organized themselves into regional armies, and sometimes militias. Nonetheless, they achieved key victories in Kawit, Imus, Alapan, and the battles of Binakayan-Dalhican which demonstrated growing militarily coordination and leadership, and allowed Emilio Aguinaldo to declare independence on June 12, 1898.

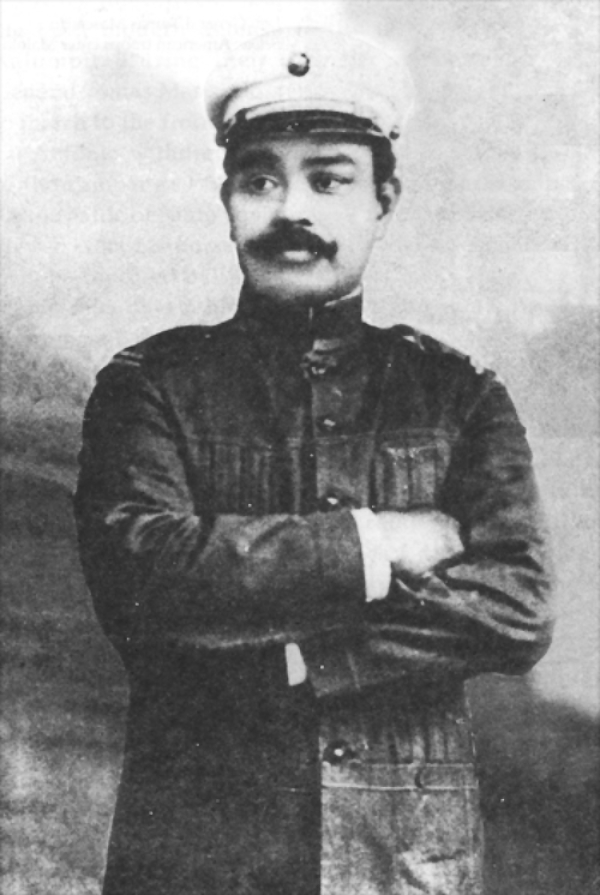
Filipino general Antonio Luna

Lieutenant General Antonio Luna enacted reforms within the Philippine Republican Army to combat the regionalism the army faced, and to transform the army into a formidable, disciplined, and standard fighting force for the new republic. During the Philippine-American War, he advocated and would later implement compulsory military service or conscription to all citizens, a mandatory form of national service for the increase of manpower of the Philippine Army. These policies generally received mixed opinions within the army, and the civilians themselves. Further complicating the polarizing figure Luna already is. These reforms ultimately reflected the militarism and militarization of the nascent Philippine Republic, a nation under constant war. The republic viewed military strength as essentially for the survival of the nation.

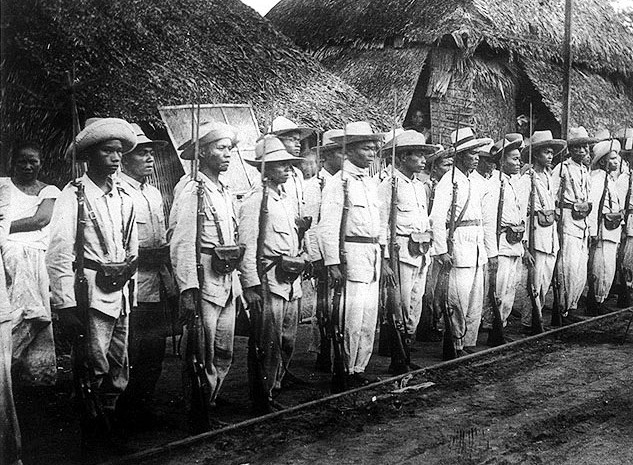
Filipino soldiers standing in attention

During World War II, the Philippines was one of the participants, as a member of Allied forces, the Philippines with the U.S. forces fought the Imperial Japanese Army (1942–1945), one of the more notable battles is the Battle of Manila.

Former president Ferdinand Marcos issued Proclamation Order No. 1081 (Martial law), effectively turning the Philippines into a garrison state under the Philippine Constabulary (PC) and Integrated National Police (INP) During this period, secondary and college education included mandatory military and nationalism training through programs such as Citizens Military Training (CMT) and the Reserve Officers’ Training Corps (ROTC). After the 1986 constitutional change, these programs became non-compulsory, though remain a part of the basic education curriculum.

=== Russia ===
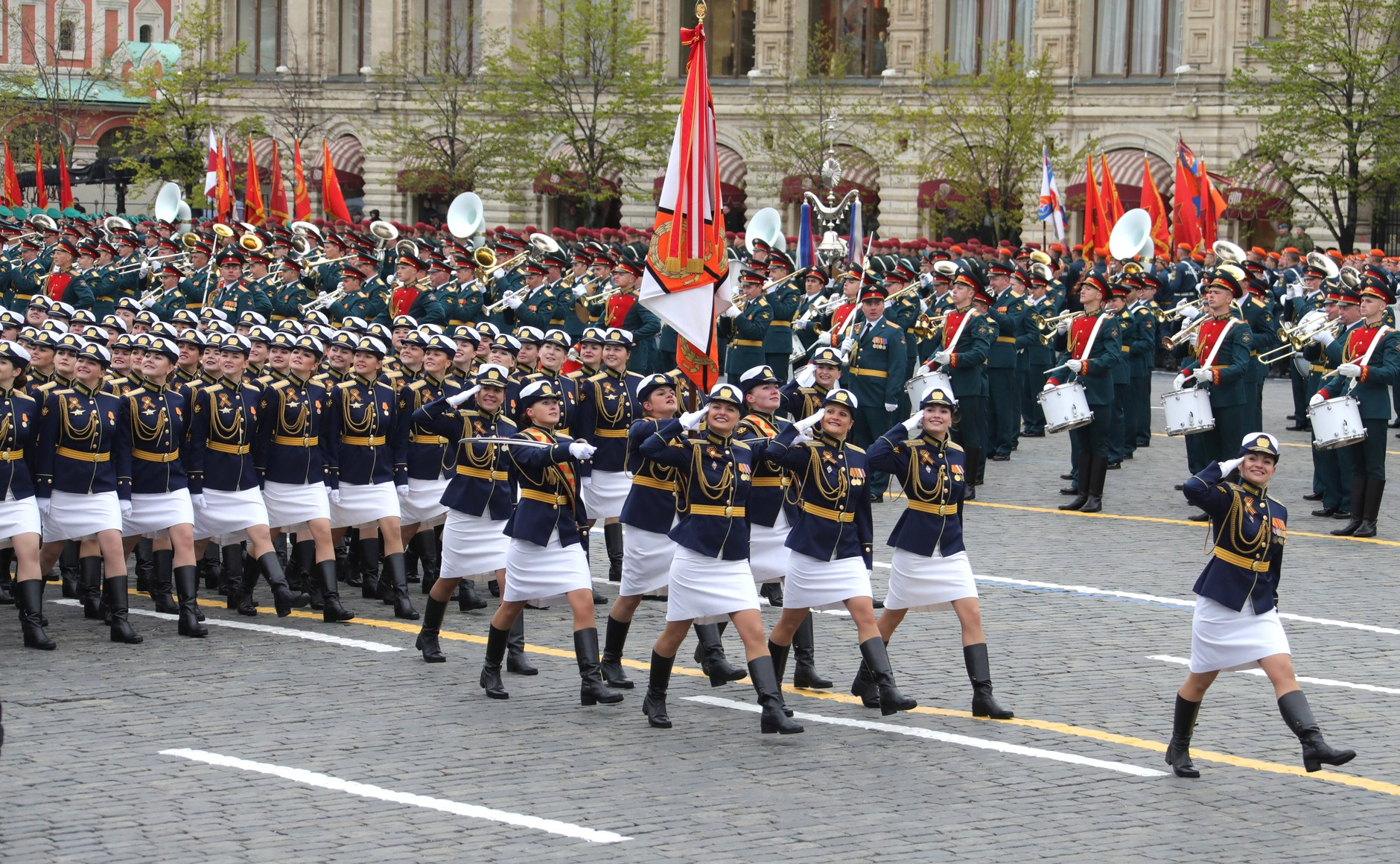
Military parade on Red Square in Moscow

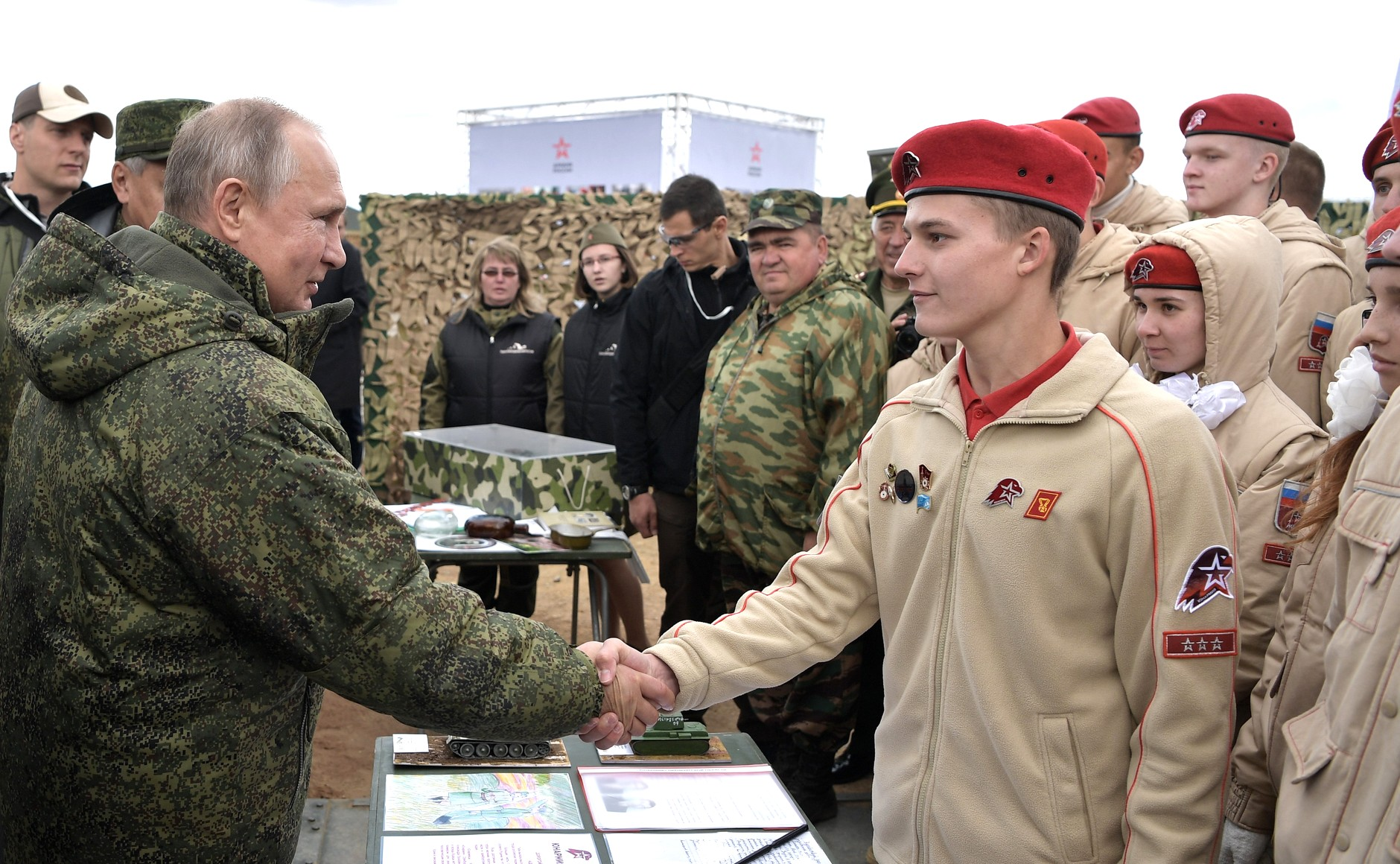
Vladimir Putin with members of the 'Yunarmiya' – or Young Army. The Young Army movement is the Kremlin's attempt to mobilize and provide basic military skills to Russian youth.

Russia has also had a long history of militarism continuing on to the present day, at least partially driven by its desire to protect its western frontier which has no natural buffers between potential invaders from the rest of continental Europe and its heartlands in European Russia. Between Peter the Great's reforms and the fall of the Soviet Union, Russia was one of Europe's great powers in terms of political and military strength. Through the Imperial era, Russia continued a campaign of violent territorial expansion into Siberia, Caucasus and into Eastern Europe, eventually conquering the majority of the Polish-Lithuanian Commonwealth in the Partitions of Poland.

The end of imperial rule in 1917 meant the loss of much territory (34% of its population, 54% of its industrial land, 89% of its coalfields, and 26% of its railways) following the treaty of Brest-Litovsk, but much of it was quickly reconquered by the Soviet Union later on, including events such as the partition of Poland and reconquest of the Baltic states in the late 1930s and ‘40s.

Soviet influence reached its peak after WWII in the Cold War era, during which the Soviet Union occupied virtually all of Eastern Europe in an ostensible military alliance known as the Warsaw Pact; though national territorial defence against the nations of NATO was a sizable component of Warsaw Pact strategy, it largely functioned as a tool of Russian imperialism with regards to its so-called satellite states in Europe. Such considerations, in truth, lay behind, for example, the Warsaw Pact invasion of Czechoslovakia in 1968, which was falsely justified as "friendly assistance to the fraternal people of Czechoslovakia"; as of 2025, Russia still does not officially consider it a military operation.

A climate of secrecy and control, rigid centralized allocation of resources, economic isolation from the rest of the world, and unquestioning acceptance of Communist rule were all predicated on national security. For example, historical consensus is that the invasion of Czechoslovakia was driven by fear that the locally prevailing campaign of reform and liberalization (that is, a campaign prevailing in a sovereign states), including the ending of blanket censorship and political surveillance by the secret police, would harm Russian interests.

Russia feared that if the Prague Spring reforms went unchecked, then those ideals might very well spread to Poland and East Germany, upsetting the status quo there as well. Within the Soviet Union, nationalism in the republics of Estonia, Latvia, Lithuania, and Ukraine was already causing problems for Moscow, and many were worried that events in Prague might exacerbate those problems.

According to documents from the Ukrainian Archives, compiled by Mark Kramer, KGB chairman Yuri Andropov and Communist Party of Ukraine leaders Petro Shelest and Nikolai Podgorny were the most vehement proponents of military intervention.

The economic and societal costs were in many cases not tracked, or were withheld from civilians. Because these costs were hidden in the Soviet system, but exposed by the transition to a market economy, many Russians blame the new system for creating these costs in the first place.

Russia was greatly weakened in what President of the Russian Federation Vladimir Putin called the greatest geopolitical disaster of the 20th century. Nevertheless, under Putin's leadership, a resurgent modern Russia has maintained a significant amount of "malign geopolitical influence" in the countries spawned from the dissolution of the Soviet Union.

Following the Russian invasion of Ukraine, the Russian government increased their efforts to introduce "patriotic education" into schools. The Associated Press reported that some parents were shocked by the militaristic nature of the Kremlin-promoted Important Conversations lessons, with some comparing them to the "patriotic education" of the former Soviet Union.

By the end of 2023, Vladimir Putin planned to spend almost 40% of public expenditures on defense and security. UK Chief of Defence Staff Admiral Tony Radakin said that "the last time we saw these levels was at the end of the Cold War and the collapse of the Soviet Union."

=== Turkey ===
Militarism has a long history in Turkey.

The Ottoman Empire lasted for centuries and always relied on its military might, but militarism was not a part of everyday life. Militarism was only introduced into daily life with the advent of modern institutions, particularly schools, which became part of the state apparatus when the Ottoman Empire was succeeded by a new nation state – the Republic of Turkey – in 1923. The founders of the republic were determined to break with the past and modernise the country. There was, however, an inherent contradiction in that their modernist vision was limited by their military roots. The leading reformers were all military men and, in keeping with the military tradition, all believed in the authority and the sacredness of the state. The public also believed in the military. It was the military, after all, who led the nation through the War of Liberation (1919–1923) and saved the motherland.

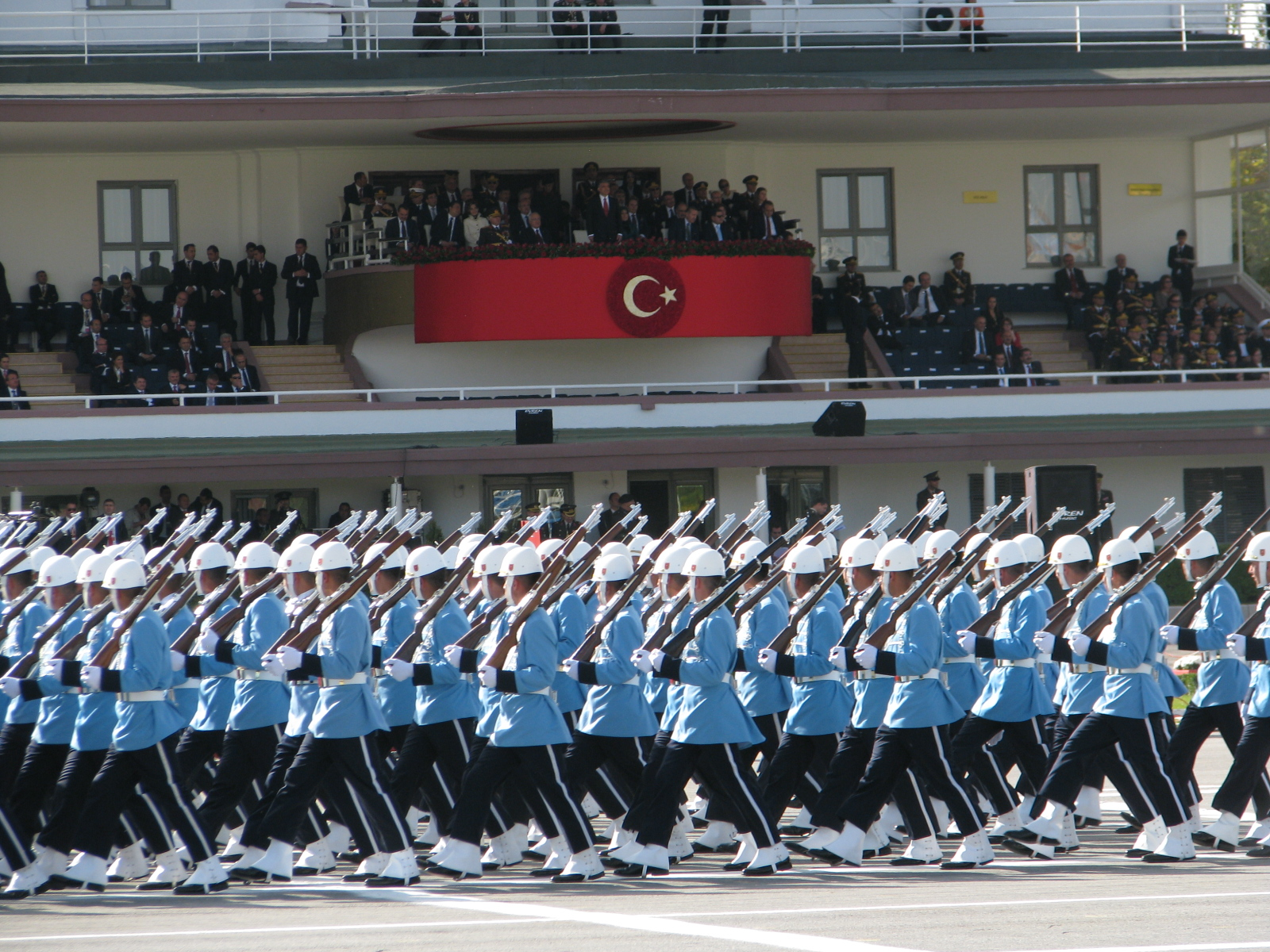
Military parade during Republic Day celebrations in Ankara

The first military coup in the history of the republic was on 27 May 1960, which resulted in the hanging of PM Adnan Menderes and 2 ministers, and a new constitution was introduced, creating a Constitutional Court to vet the legislation passed by parliament, and a military-dominated National Security Council to oversee the government affairs similar to the politburo in the Soviet Union. The second military coup took place on 12 March 1971, this time only forcing the government to resign and installing a cabinet of technocrats and bureaucrats without dissolving the parliament. The third military coup took place on 12 September 1980, which resulted in the dissolution of parliament and all political parties as well as imposition of a much more authoritarian constitution. There was another military intervention that was called a "post-modern coup" on 28 February 1997 which merely forced the government to resign, and finally an unsuccessful military coup attempt on 15 July 2016.

The constitutional referendums in 2010 and 2017 have changed the composition and role of the National Security Council, and placed the armed forces under the control of civilian government.

=== United States ===
In the late nineteenth and early twentieth centuries political and military leaders reformed the US federal government to establish a stronger central government than had ever previously existed for the purpose of enabling the nation to pursue an imperial policy in the Pacific and in the Caribbean and economic militarism to support the development of the new industrial economy. This reform was the result of a conflict between Neo-Hamiltonian Republicans and Jeffersonian-Jacksonian Democrats over the proper administration of the state and direction of its foreign policy. The conflict pitted proponents of professionalism, based on business management principles, against those favoring more local control in the hands of laymen and political appointees. The outcome of this struggle, including a more professional federal civil service and a strengthened presidency and executive branch, made a more expansionist foreign policy possible.

After the end of the American Civil War the national army fell into disrepair. Reforms based on various European states including Britain, Germany, and Switzerland were made so that it would become responsive to control from the central government, prepared for future conflicts, and develop refined command and support structures; these reforms led to the development of professional military thinkers and cadre.

During this time the ideas of social Darwinism helped propel American overseas expansion in the Pacific and Caribbean. This required modifications for a more efficient central government due to the added administration requirements (see above).

Further information: List of countries with highest military expenditures

Military spending, top 25 countries by % GDP, 2024
| Country | % GDP spent on military |
|---|---|
| Ukraine | 34.5 |
| Israel | 8.8 |
| Algeria | 8.0 |
| Saudi Arabia | 7.3 |
| Russia | 7.1 |
| Myanmar | 6.8 |
| Oman | 5.6 |
| Armenia | 5.5 |
| Azerbaijan | 5.0 |
| Kuwait | 4.8 |
| Jordan | 4.8 |
| Burkina Faso | 4.7 |
| Mali | 4.2 |
| Poland | 4.2 |
| Burundi | 3.8 |
| Brunei | 3.6 |
| Morocco | 3.5 |
| United States | 3.4 |
| Estonia | 3.4 |
| Colombia | 3.4 |
| Latvia | 3.3 |
| Greece | 3.1 |
| Lithuania | 3.1 |
| Chad | 3.0 |
| Kyrgyzstan | 3.0 |

Military spending, top 25 countries by PPP, 2024
| Country | $billions spent on military |
|---|---|
| United States | 997 |
| China | 567 |
| Russia | 401 |
| India | 308 |
| Ukraine | 183 |
| South Korea | 96 |
| Germany | 99 |
| Japan | 91 |
| France | 91 |
| United Kingdom | 86 |
| Brazil | 64 |
| Poland | 62 |
| Italy | 60 |
| Turkey | 59 |
| Indonesia | 47 |
| Colombia | 43 |
| Mexico | 40 |
| Spain | 39 |
| Australia | 31 |
| Canada | 31 |
| Netherlands | 21 |
| Philippines | 21 |
| Romania | 21 |
| Greece | 17 |
| Malaysia | 14 |

The enlargement of the U.S. Army for the Spanish–American War was considered essential to the occupation and control of the new territories acquired from Spain in its defeat (Guam, the Philippines, Puerto Rico, and Cuba). The previous limit by legislation of 24,000 men was expanded to 60,000 regulars in the new army bill on 2 February 1901, with allowance at that time for expansion to 80,000 regulars by presidential discretion at times of national emergency.

U.S. forces were again enlarged immensely for World War I. Officers such as George S. Patton were permanent captains at the start of the war and received temporary promotions to colonel.

Between the first and second world wars, the US Marine Corps engaged in questionable activities in the Banana Wars in Latin America. Retired Major General Smedley Butler, who was at the time of his death the most decorated Marine, spoke strongly against what he considered to be trends toward fascism and militarism. Butler briefed Congress on what he described as a Business Plot for a military coup, for which he had been suggested as leader; the matter was partially corroborated, but the real threat has been disputed. The Latin American expeditions ended with Franklin D. Roosevelt's Good Neighbor policy of 1934.

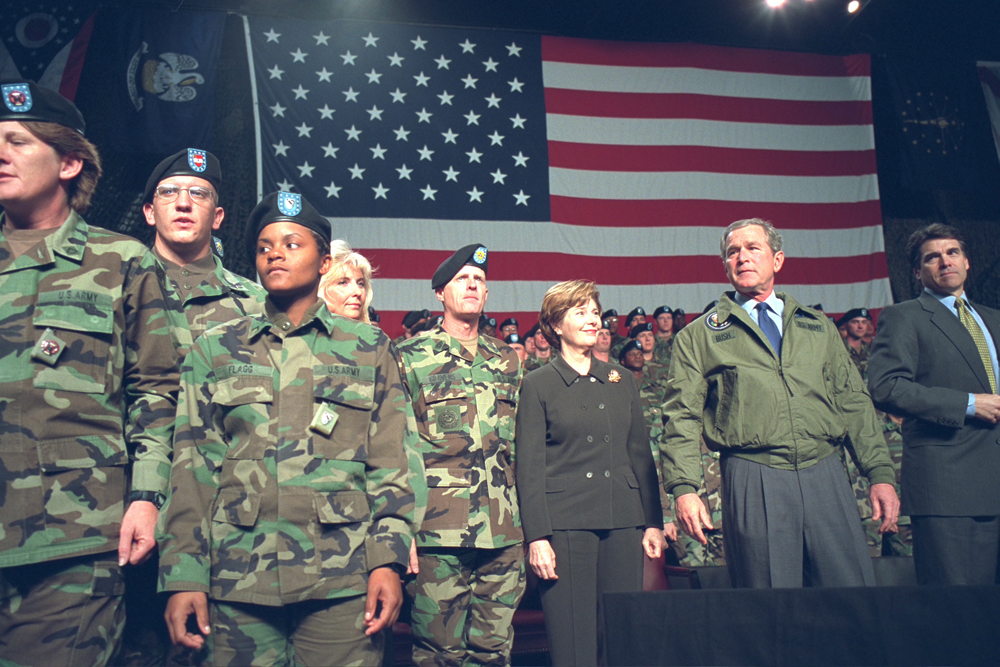
President George W. Bush with troops at Fort Hood, Texas, 2003

After World War II, there were major cutbacks, such that units responding early in the Korean War under United Nations authority (e.g. Task Force Smith) were unprepared, resulting in catastrophic performance. When Harry S. Truman fired Douglas MacArthur, the tradition of civilian control held and MacArthur left without any hint of military coup.

The Cold War resulted in serious permanent military buildups. Dwight D. Eisenhower, a retired top military commander elected as a civilian president, warned, as he was leaving office, of the development of a military–industrial complex. In the Cold War, there emerged many civilian academics and industrial researchers, such as Henry Kissinger and Herman Kahn, who had significant input into the use of military force. The complexities of nuclear strategy and the debates surrounding them helped produce a new group of 'defense intellectuals' and think tanks, such as the Rand Corporation (where Kahn, among others, worked).

It has been argued that the United States has shifted to a state of neomilitarism since the end of the Vietnam War. This form of militarism is distinguished by the reliance on a relatively small number of volunteer fighters; heavy reliance on complex technologies; and the rationalization and expansion of government advertising and recruitment programs designed to promote military service. President Joe Biden signed a record $886 billion defense spending bill into law on 22 December 2023.

=== Venezuela ===
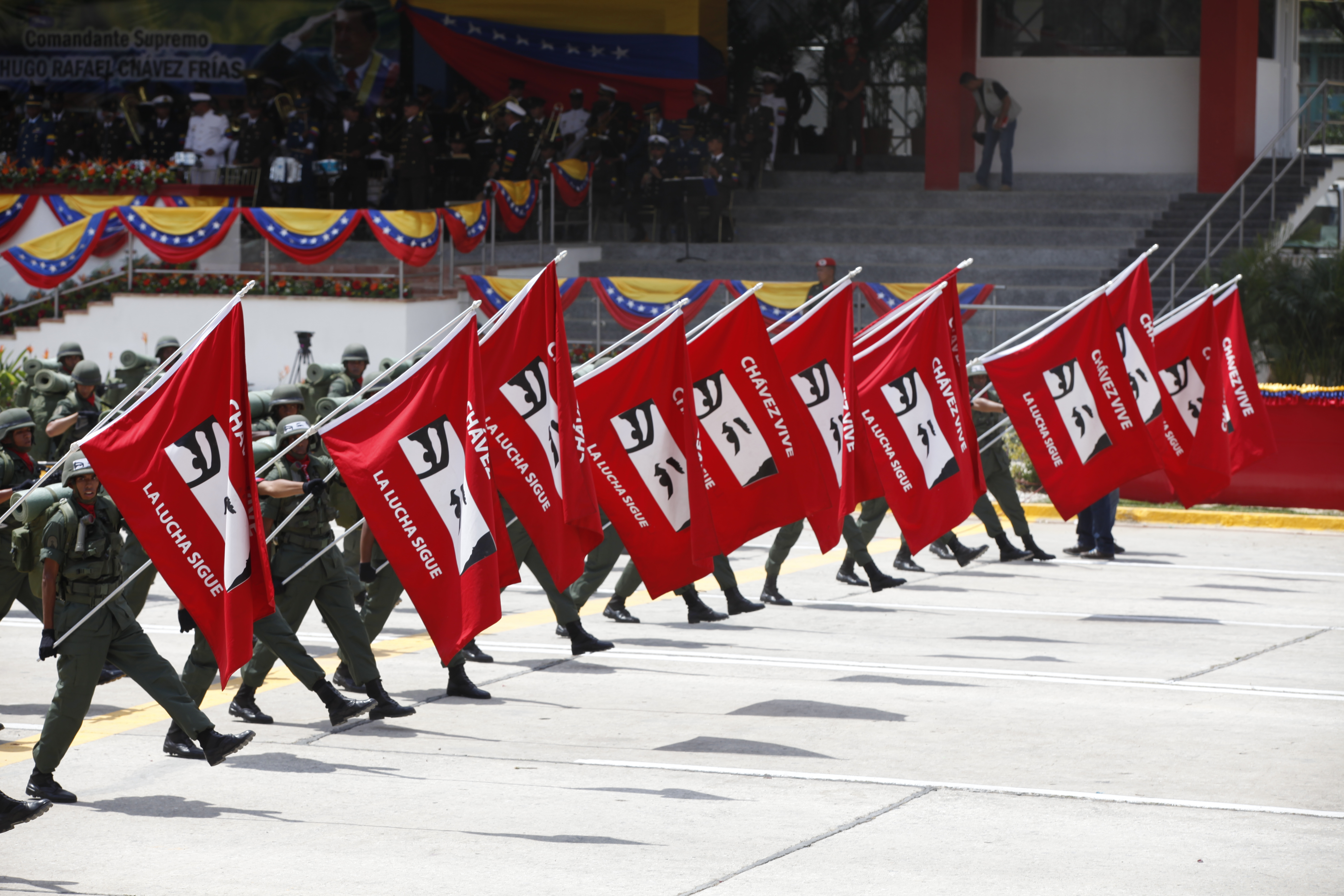
Members of the Venezuelan armed forces carrying Chávez eyes flags saying, "Chávez lives, the fight continues"

Militarism in Venezuela follows the cult and myth of Simón Bolívar, known as the liberator of Venezuela. For much of the 1800s, Venezuela was ruled by powerful, militarist leaders known as caudillos. Between 1892 and 1900 alone, six rebellions occurred and 437 military actions were taken to obtain control of Venezuela. With the military controlling Venezuela for much of its history, the country practiced a "military ethos", with civilians today still believing that military intervention in the government is positive, especially during times of crisis, with many Venezuelans believing that the military opens democratic opportunities instead of blocking them.

Much of the modern political movement behind the Fifth Republic of Venezuela, ruled by the Bolivarian government established by Hugo Chávez, was built on the following of Bolívar and such militaristic ideals.

=== Syria ===
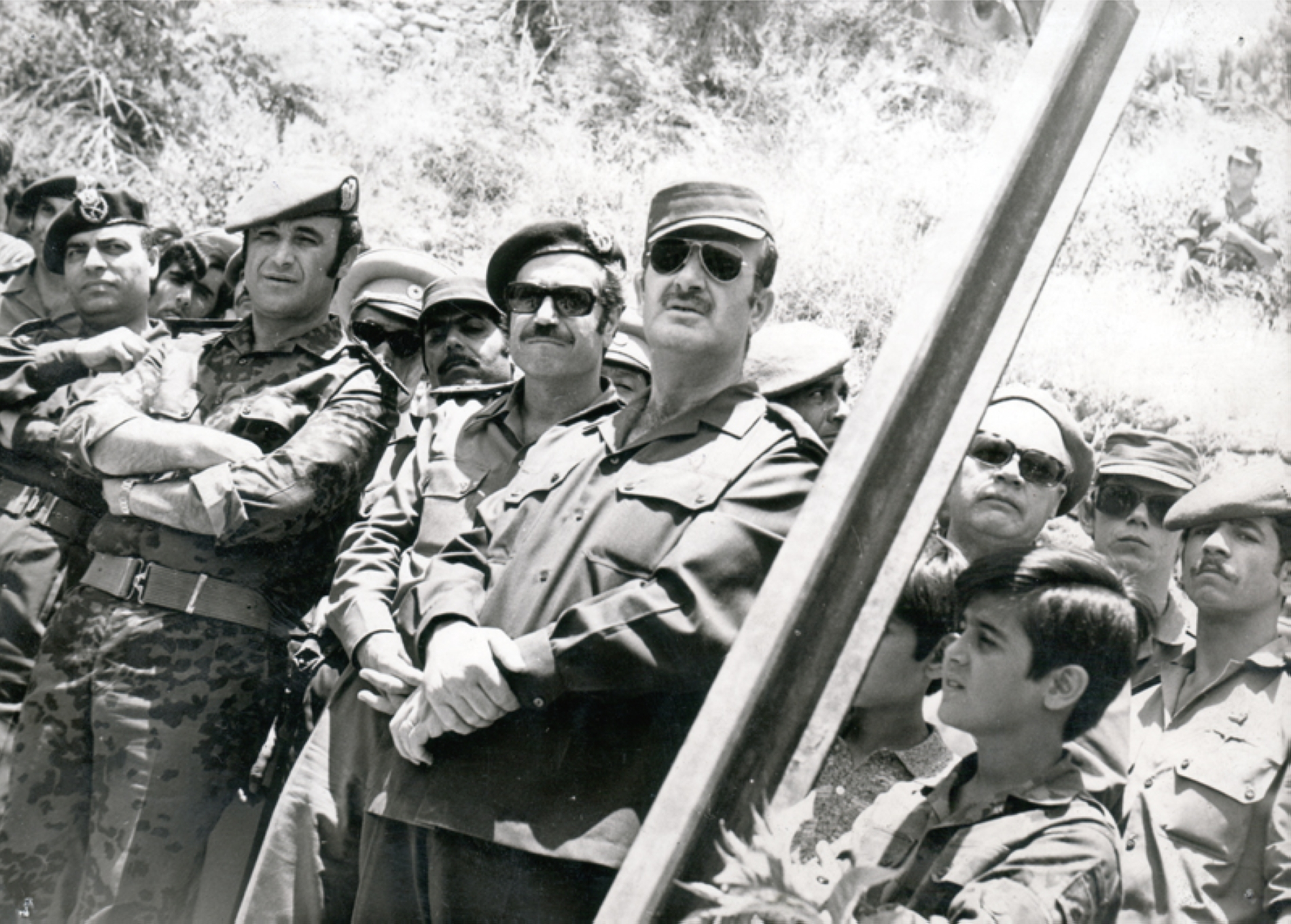
Hafez Assad visiting a military camp near Damascus, 1978

The history of Syrian militarism begins in 1963, when the army staged a military coup against the democratically elected president Nazim al-Qudsi and brought the Ba'ath Party to power, beginning a new era in Syrian history. It was after this coup that Syria turned towards militarization, and with each new internal party coup it increased. Neo-Ba'athism (whose supporters came to power in 1966) differed greatly from the standard version of Ba'athism, including the idea of strong militarization.

In 1970 (after another coup), military General Hafez al-Assad came to power. His regime turned out to be the most stable and long-lasting. Assad also conducted an active campaign to militarize Syrian society throughout his rule to resist Israel, including alone (starting in the 80s). This policy led to Syria becoming one of the most militarized countries in the world with a large and professional army with high number of soldiers, Air Force and tank fleets.

However, by December 2024, after 13 years of brutal civil war, the Syrian army had become largely degraded and weakened, due to problems such as widespread corruption, lack of fuel for armored vehicles, a ruined economy (which made it impossible for the regime to support its military spending on its own), and low morale among its soldiers. All of this led to the surprisingly rapid collapse of the Bashar Assad's regime as a result of several surprise offensives by the Syrian opposition.

=== Iraq ===
Like neighboring Syria, Iraq has been a highly militarized state for decades. From rule of Abd al-Karim Qasim until the Ba'athist seizure of power in 1968, the Iraqi government had followed a policy of the militarization of society.

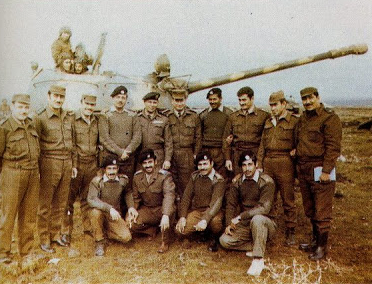
Iraqi army soldiers on the Golan Heights during October war in 1973

Abdul-Karim Qasim, who seized power in 1958, was an Iraqi nationalist and Qasimist. This brought him into conflict with his neighbors, Kuwait and Iran, whose territories he claimed (in the Iranian case, only the province of Khuzestan). To protect his ambitions, Qasim needed a competent army, which he was able to build.

After coming to power in 1968, the Ba'athists continued the militarization policies begun by their predecessors. While the period from 1960 to 1980 was peaceful, expenditure on the military trebled: in 1981 it stood at US$4.3 billion and nearly equaled the national incomes of Jordan and Yemen combined. Per capita military spending in 1981 was 370 percent higher than that for education. During the Iran–Iraq War military expenditures increased dramatically (while economic growth was shrinking) and the number of people employed in the military increased fivefold, to one million.

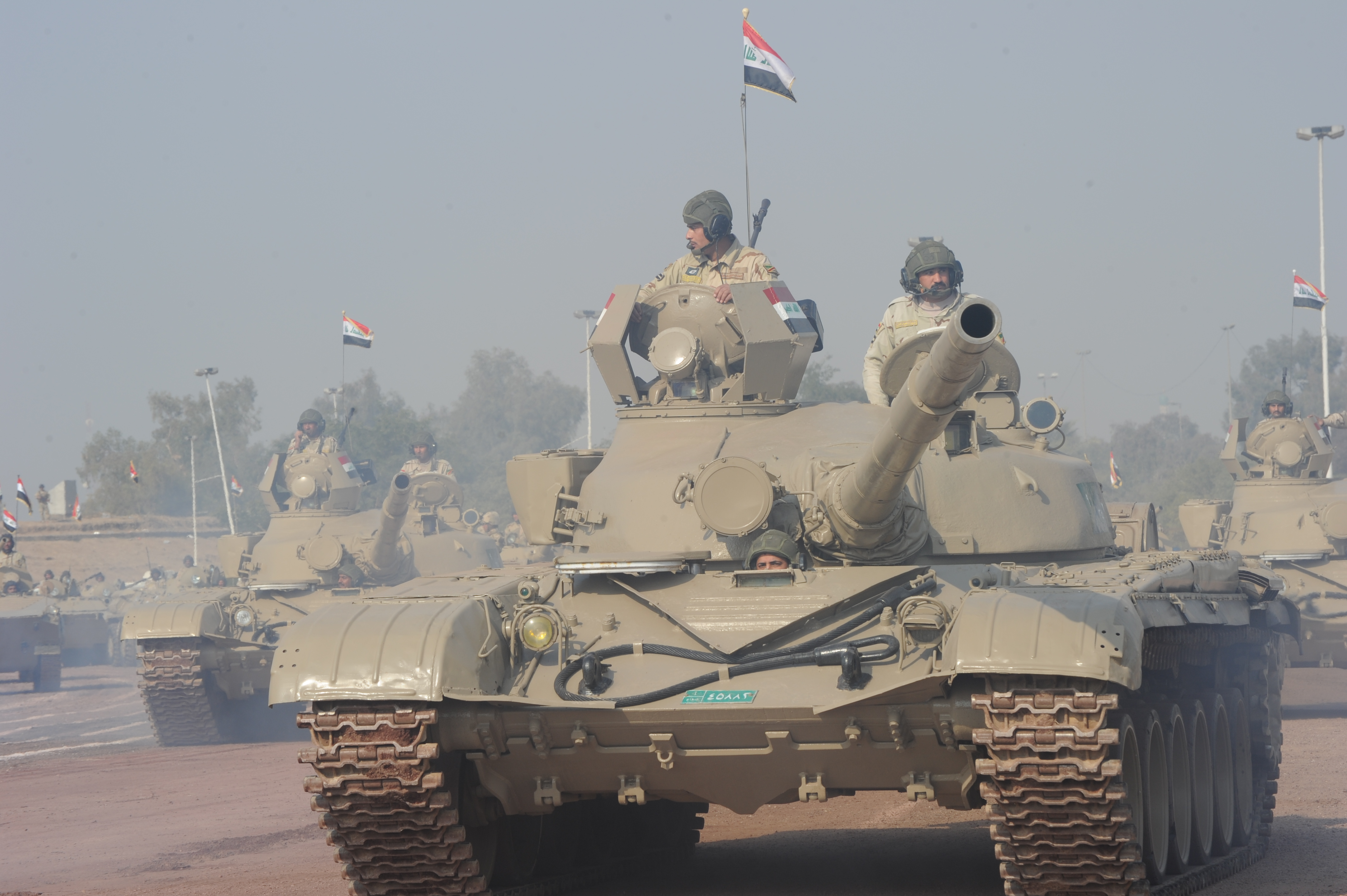
Parade of New Iraqi army, 2011

By 1990, Iraq had become the most militarized country per capita in the world, and was in the top ten on many measures. However, despite the high costs of the army (in comparison with the strength of the Iraqi economy), the huge number of soldiers and all types of weapons, as well as a very good domestic military industry, its effectiveness remained questionable. In 1991 and 2003, this army was literally routed by enemy forces and suffered very heavy losses without inflicting any serious on the enemy.

== See also ==
- Economic militarism
- Jingoism
- Militarization of police
- Military-industrial complex
- Military junta
- Stratocracy
- Neo-militarism
