= Hitch (surname) =

Hitch is a surname. Notable people with the surname include:

- Bill Hitch (1886–1965), cricketer
- Brian Hitch (1932–2004), British diplomat
- Bryan Hitch (born 1970), British comic-book artist
- Charles J. Hitch (1910–1995), US Assistant Secretary of Defense and president of the University of California
- Frederick Hitch (1856–1913), recipient of the Victoria Cross
- Frederick Brook Hitch (1897–1957), British sculptor
- Lew Hitch (1929–2012), National Basketball Association player
- Nathaniel Hitch (1845–1938), British sculptor; father of Frederick Brook Hitch
- Neon Hitch (born 1986), British singer and songwriter
