= Economic militarism =

Belief that the economy should be assisted by the military

Economic militarism is the ideology surrounding the use of military expenditure to prop up an economy, or the use of military power to gain control or access to territory or other economic resources. Thus a link between output and military expenditure can be made. The scope of this effect depend on : threat faced, productivity of factors, degree of the military utilisation, finance method of military spending, its externalities and effectiveness of this military spending in countering the treaty. As a consequence, a same amount of military spending in different countries can have wide-ranging effects.

== Brief history of the term ==
The first important use dates from 1939 with Germany Rampant: A Study in Economic Militarism by Ernest Hambloch, a long-serving British diplomat. Germany Rampant "traces the philosophy of Nazism to the German mythological figures of ancient times."

Since this book the term has been used in connection with the ancient Aztecs, and with militaristic movements in a variety of cultures, and applies to the ideological and cultural aspects of a state, society or group that sustain the drive for hegemony or empire. For example, Joseph Kenney applies the term to the Almoravids.

In 2003 Clyde Prestowitz, of the Economic Strategy Institute published a book containing his analysis of what he called economic militarism in American foreign policy, that was reviewed in The Economist magazine.

== Demand effect ==
Military expenditure can impact the economy of a country and its growth through the demand effect. An increase of military spending, will increase the prosperity of the country and its employment rate, thanks to a rise of demand. It is linked to the Keynesian multiplier effect, introduced by Richard Kahn in the 1930s, that states that every exogenous rise in government expenditure will decrease unemployment and increase growth, no matter the form of expenditure. However, the extent of this effect, and some potential others, will depend on the way this expenditure will be financed (see War finance).

Changes in the industrial output will also appear when military expenditure is increased. This effect can be explained thanks to the Input-output model.

== Supply effect ==
As previously said, an increase of military expenditure can change the industrial output thanks to the input-output effect, but it as a consequence, also modifies the input. Factors of production such as labor force, natural resources, or capital can be heavily changed when the government has the desire to increase its military capacity. Some resources previously used by civilians or by other branches of production are transferred to the military field. This could destroy profoundly resources of a country (especially during war times). Research and development (R&D) investments can also be made to improve the military capacity of production. It could then have positive impacts on other production fields. Moreover, more workers will be employed, which might reduce the unemployment rate, but this might also reduce their productivity when they will return to a non-military sector of employment, or the unemployment rate could rise again dramatically when the military use will decrease. As a consequence, an increase of military expenditure can create a large variety of economic impacts and externalities, positives and/or negatives (see also: Externality).

== Security effect ==
In order to invest and innovate, agents should be confident in the economic, its well-being and as a consequence, in the security of persons. During war times or in cases of foreign threats, military expenditure could enable to increase security, maintain the market operations and thus increase output. Indeed, if you look at the world dynamic of military spendings over time, you can clearly identify a positive relation between war or war threat and spendings; for example during the First World War, The Second World War and the Cold War.

However, in some situations military expenditure is rather use to increase exponentially the military industrial complex and to threaten other nations (as it was the case during the Cold War), and can lead to dangerous arms races.

== See also ==
- Militarism
- Military Keynesianism
- Military–industrial complex
- War economy
- War finance
- Immanuel Wallerstein
