= Charles J. Hitch =

American economist and Assistant Secretary of Defense

13th President of the University of California
- In office 1967–1975
- Preceded by: Clark Kerr
- Succeeded by: David S. Saxon

Assistant Secretary of Defense (Comptroller)
- In office 1961–1965
- Preceded by: Franklin B. Lincoln
- Succeeded by: Robert N. Anthony

Personal details
- Born: January 9, 1910 Boonville, Missouri
- Died: September 11, 1995 (aged 85)
- Education: University of Arizona; Worcester College, Oxford
- Profession: American Economist

Academic work
- Discipline: Economics
- Institutions: University of California; Rand Corporation

Charles J. Hitch (January 9, 1910 – September 11, 1995) was an American economist and Assistant Secretary of Defense from 1961 to 1965. He later served as vice chancellor (1965–1967) and president (1967–1975) of the University of California and president of Resources for the Future (1975-1978).

Hitch was born in Boonville, Missouri to Arthur M. Hitch and Bertha Johnston. His brother was Thomas Kemper Hitch. He was educated at Kemper Military School before leaving for the University of Arizona, where he became a member of the Delta Chi fraternity and received a BA in economics in 1931. After pursuing graduate studies at Harvard University during the 1931–1932 academic year, he received a Rhodes Scholarship to Oxford University, where he received a second bachelor's degree in 1935 and the Oxbridge MA in 1938. That year, he became the first Rhodes Scholar to join the university's faculty as a fellow of The Queen's College, Oxford.

During World War II, Hitch served as a staff economist under W. Averell Harriman during his special envoyship to Europe before joining the War Production Board. He later served in the Office of Strategic Services as an officer of the United States Army and was discharged at the rank of first lieutenant in 1945.

Between 1948 and 1961, he was head of Rand Corporation's Economics Division in Santa Monica, California. While at Rand, he co-authored with Roland McKean The Economics of Defense in the Nuclear Age (Harvard University Press, 1960), described by the New York Times as the 'bible' for defense budgeting.

From 1961 to 1965, he served as Assistant Secretary of Defense in the Kennedy and Johnson administrations, with responsibility for overhauling military budgeting. As the DOD's comptroller, he was directed by Secretary Robert McNamara to produce a long-term, program-oriented Defense budget that became USDOD's Planning, Programming and Budgeting System (PPBS).

After Ronald Reagan, then governor of California, fired University of California President Clark Kerr upon taking office in 1967, Hitch was tapped to be his replacement. Reagan had campaigned on putting an end to Vietnam-era student activism and cutting appropriations to higher education. Hitch's attempts to ensure the university's autonomy were not always successful: they were forced to start charging tuition, and the regents, appointed by the governor, gained the power to appoint and promoted faculty.

Hitch left the UC presidency in 1975. That year, he was awarded the UCSF medal. Upon leaving the university, he took the role of president of Resources for the Future, which he held until his retirement in 1978.

He was posthumously elected to the 2002 class of Fellows of the Institute for Operations Research and the Management Sciences.

Academic offices
Preceded by Clark Kerr	President of the University of California; 1967–1975	Succeeded by David S. Saxon
