= Output budgeting =

Management technique

Output budgeting is a wide-ranging management technique introduced in the United States in the mid-1960s by Robert S. McNamara's collaborator Charles J. Hitch, not always with ready cooperation with the administrators and based on the industrial management techniques of program budgeting. Subsequently, the technique has been introduced in other countries including Canada and the UK.

== Overview ==
Planning, Programming, and Budgeting System (PPBS) is in effect an integration of a number of techniques in a planning and budgeting process for identifying, costing and assigning a complexity of resources for establishing priorities and strategies in a major program and for forecasting costs, expenditure and achievements within the immediate financial year or over a longer period.

== Examples ==
United States Department of Defense leaders use their Planning, Programming, and Budgeting System to link operational requirements with financial obligations. Department of Defense branches typically divides the process into plans, programs and budgets. While planning, programming, and budgeting continues throughout the year, PPBS dictates a sequential and an annual process culminating with annual Defense Plan, followed by a Defense Program, and then a Defense Budget.

PPBS requires Planners focus on operational requirements, programmers link the plans to a six-year financial plan (known as a Future Years Defense Plan (FYDP)), and budgeters prepare a two-year Congressional budget. While each step contains more detailed financial data, the two-year Congressional budget stems from the six-year Future Years Defense Plan, which is based on the even longer term Defense Plan.

== Literature ==
- Department of Education and Science, London, England. (1970).Output Budgeting for the Department of Education and Science, Pendragon House, Inc. 176 p.
- Christine E. Bonham, Elizabeth A. McClarin (2000), Accrual Budgeting: Experiences of Other Nations and Implications for the United States, DIANE, 217 p.

== Sources ==
- Performance Budgeting: Linking Funding and Results, Marc Robinson (ed.), IMF, 2007
- From Line-item to Program Budgeting, John Kim, Seoul, 2007
- Program and Performance Budgeting Enthusiasm in India -- IMF Training Course, Holger van Eden, IMF, 2007
