= Hitch hike (dance) =

Type of dance

Hitch hike was a dance craze of the 1960s. It started with the 1962 Marvin Gaye hit "Hitch Hike" and refueled with the gold disc of Vanity Fare, "Hitchin' a Ride" (1969).

The dance is extremely simple and is based on the hitchhiking gesture: waving the stuck-out thumb. The classical Motown pattern is three times right thumb to the right over the shoulder, clap hands, three times left thumb to the left over the shoulder, clap hands. All this is accompanied by the shimmy body ripples popular at these times.

Since these times the dance move firmly established itself in various line, club and jazz dances, especially disco, and may be seen in films such as Hairspray.

The style of the move depends on the dance and may be accompanied with steps back or sideways or hip movements.
