= The Hitcher =

The Hitcher(s) or Hitcher(s) may refer to:

- Hitcher, one who goes hitchhiking
- The Hitcher (1986 film), action horror film
  - The Hitcher II: I've Been Waiting (2003), sequel
- The Hitcher (2007 film), slasher film and remake of the 1986 film
- The Hitcher (character), recurring character in The Mighty Boosh
- The Hitchers (band), band from the Irish city of Limerick formed in 1989

== See also ==
- Hitch (disambiguation)
- Hitching (disambiguation)
