= Ruth Cravath =

American stonework artist and arts educator

- Ruth Cravath in 1955; Photo by Imogen Cunningham
- Born: Ruth Barrows Cravath; January 23, 1902; Chicago, Illinois, U.S.
- Died: November 30, 1986 (aged 84); Poulsbo, Washington, U.S.
- Education: California School of Fine Arts
- Spouse: Sam Bell Wakefield III (m. 1928–?)

Ruth Wakefield Cravath (1902–1986) was an American stonework artist and arts educator, specifically known for her public sculptures, busts and bas-reliefs in the San Francisco Bay Area.

== Biography ==
Ruth Barrows Cravath was born in Chicago, Illinois, on January 23, 1902 to Ruth Myra Rew and James Raney Cravath.

In high school Cravath attended summer art classes at the Art Institute of Chicago. Cravath attended college at Grinnell College in Iowa for one year before moving to California in 1921 to join her family. She attended California School of Fine Arts in San Francisco and studied with Beniamino Bufano and Ralph Stackpole. She learned "cut direct" sculpting techniques from Stackpole. In 1926 she started teaching at the California School of Fine Arts, where her students included artists Jacques Schnier and Raymond Puccinelli. In the same year, she co-founded the San Francisco Summer Art School for Children with Marian Trace. In 1928 she married Sam Bell Wakefield III.

Cravath was commissioned to create three statues for the north court of the 1940 Golden Gate International Exposition, GGIE, designed by Timothy L. Pflueger. Her three statues surrounded the "Fountain of Western Waters" in the "Court of Pacifica" area of the Exposition and included a large sculpture named "Alaskan boy spearing a fish".

Her brother Austin Cravath married the artist Dorothy Wagner Puccinelli in 1941. In 1945, Cravath began teaching art at Mills College in Oakland.

From 1958 to 1986, she lived at the historic Kerrigan House at 893 Wisconsin Street, between 22nd Street and Madera Street in San Francisco. She had lived near artist Jean Halpert–Ryden in the 1960s. Cravath died on November 30, 1986, in Poulsbo, Washington, at the age of 84.

== Public works ==
Cravath's best known work in the San Francisco Bay Area was her 27-foot-tall, cast-concrete and steel-reinforced statue of St. Francis that stood at the entrance of Candlestick Park from 1973 until 2015.

=== San Francisco Bay Area ===
- 1929, Fountain in Tennessee Marble, Emanu-El Sisterhood Residency (now called San Francisco Zen Center, the fountain has been removed), San Francisco
- 1930, Bar Maid, The Pacific Stock Exchange Lunch Club (now called The City Club), San Francisco
- 1930, Laborers, The Pacific Stock Exchange Lunch Club (now called The City Club), San Francisco
- Athletic Award Tablet, Tamalpais School (now called Marin Academy), San Rafael
- William Award (bronze tablet), Tamalpais School (now called Marin Academy), San Rafael
- St. Francis, Candlestick Park, San Francisco (in the process of being relocated by 2018)
