= Holpert =

Holpert is a surname. Notable people with the surname include:

- Ervin Holpert (born 1986), Serbian sprint canoeist
- Jan Holpert (born 1962), German handball player
- Jožef Holpert (born 1961), Yugoslav handball player

== See also ==
- Halpert
- Holbert
