= Dorothy Wagner Puccinelli =

American painter

Dorothy W. Puccinelli
- Born: Dorothy Wagner; December 19, 1901; San Antonio, Texas, U.S.
- Died: May 24, 1974 (aged 72); Berkeley, California, U.S.
- Other name: Dorothy Puccinelli Cravath
- Education: California School of Fine Arts, Rudolph Schaeffer School of Design
- Years active: 1919–c.1940
- Style: WPA-era murals and paintings
- Spouses: Raymond Puccinelli; Austin Cravath
- Children: 1

Dorothy Wagner Puccinelli, also known as Dorothy Puccinelli Cravath (December 19, 1901 – May 24, 1974), was a New Deal-era artist and muralist. She was based in San Francisco, California.

== Biography ==
Born as Dorothy Wagner on December 19, 1901, in San Antonio, Texas, at age five her family moved and settling in Half Moon Bay, California. In 1919, she enrolled at the California School of Fine Arts (now known as San Francisco Art Institute) and then continued in 1925 at the Rudolph Schaeffer School of Design in San Francisco to studied with Beniamino Bufano.

Her first marriage was to artist Raymond Puccinelli which ended in divorce. In 1941, Dorothy married Austin Cravath (brother of artist Ruth Cravath) and together they had a daughter named Anne.

In 1937, Puccinelli created a 6′ x 8′ tempera-on-canvas mural called Vacheros at the post office in Merced, California. The mural was funded by the Treasury Section of Fine Arts.

In 1939, Puccinelli worked with artist, Helen Katharine Forbes to paint the interior four panel murals of the Mother's Building at the San Francisco Zoo. The four murals depict a Noah's Ark-theme with animals and were funded by Federal Art Project (FAP) and Works Progress Administration (WPA). From 1978 until 2002, the Mother's Building served as a gift shop for the zoo, the mural is now in need of restoration and the room is only used for special events.

In 1960 and 1975, Puccinelli and Emmy Lou Packard restored murals, including Coit Tower.
