= Holbert =

Holbert is a surname. Notable people with the surname include:

- Aaron Holbert (born 1973), American baseball player
- Al Holbert (1946–1988), American racing driver
- Bruce Holbert (born 1959), American writer
- Chris Holbert (born 1961), American politician
- Darius Holbert (born 1974), American musician
- Jerry Holbert (1958–2022), American cartoonist
- Henry Holbert (1927–1995), American football coach
- Ray Holbert (born 1970), American baseball player
- William Dathan Holbert (born 1979), American murderer
