= Susannah Hays =

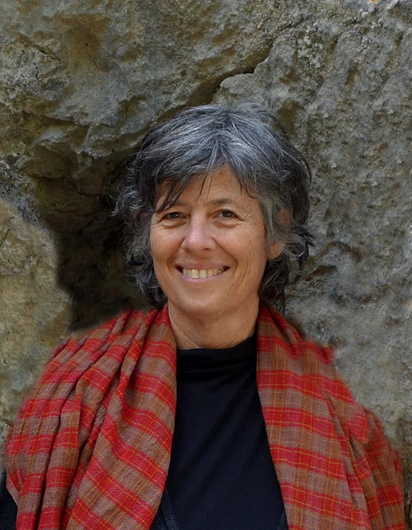
- Born: 1959 (age 66–67); Boston, Massachusetts
- Education: Mills College, San Francisco Art Institute, University of California, Berkeley
- Occupations: Artist, educator – photography

Susannah Hays (born 1959) is an American artist and educator practicing in the fields of philosophy, ecology, technical processes in historical and contemporary photography and the book as art. She first gained recognition for her work in 2000 when she joined Scott Nichols Gallery in San Francisco. She has participated in numerous solo and group exhibitions there as well as at Seager/Gray Gallery in Marin, California and Photo-Eye Gallery in Santa Fe, New Mexico. While she is especially known for cameraless and 19th Century processes, her creative work expands to realms of experimentation in all visual media. Her seminar courses focus on the practice of art and ecology, embodied mind cognition, space constructions, topologies and visual autobiography.

== Life ==
Hays was born in Boston Massachusetts (twin brother John Hays) and lived in Connecticut until 1978, when she moved to the San Francisco Bay Area to attend Mills College. She received a BA in American Studies from Mills College, and an MFA in Photography from San Francisco Art Institute. Her MA in Visual Studies and PhD in Interdisciplinary Studies were completed at the University of California, Berkeley. While earning her MA, she was awarded the Eisner Prize for Photography. At the Art Institute, she studied with Doug Hall and Ann Chamberlain. At U.C. Berkeley she studied with philosopher Alva Nöe, poet Lyn Hejinian, painter Tony Dubovsky, filmmaker Trinh T. Minh-ha and digital media artist Greg Niemeyer. In 2012, she moved from Berkeley to Santa Fe, New Mexico, where she currently resides.

== Career ==
From 1990 to 2012 Hays was the sole proprietor of Works on Paper, a paper conservation laboratory specializing in the preservation of photographs and the production of Artist's books. From 1991 to 1997 she was married to painter Matt Phillips, with whom she collaborated artistically. In 1996, she curated the national exhibition Science Imagined for the Berkeley Art Center and in 2007 Zero In Zero Out for Donna Seager Gallery. She joined the faculty of the San Francisco Art Institute from 2002 to 2012 and has also taught at California College of the Arts, University of California Berkeley, San Francisco Center for the Book, Shenkar College of Art and Design in Ramat Gan, Israel, Leuphana Universität in Lüneburg Germany, and Santa Fe University of Art and Design. She is currently contributing faculty at The University of Georgia Study Abroad Program in Cortona, Italy. Her work has been included in numerous solo and group exhibitions and featured in various articles and reviews such as the New Mexico Museum of Art, Directly from Nature; Scuola Internazionale di Grafica, Verniciatura; None-Such Space, Nature Word ~ Verbe Nature; Townsend Center for the Humanities, Everyday Constellations; and Artists Television Access, Penumbra.

== Collections ==
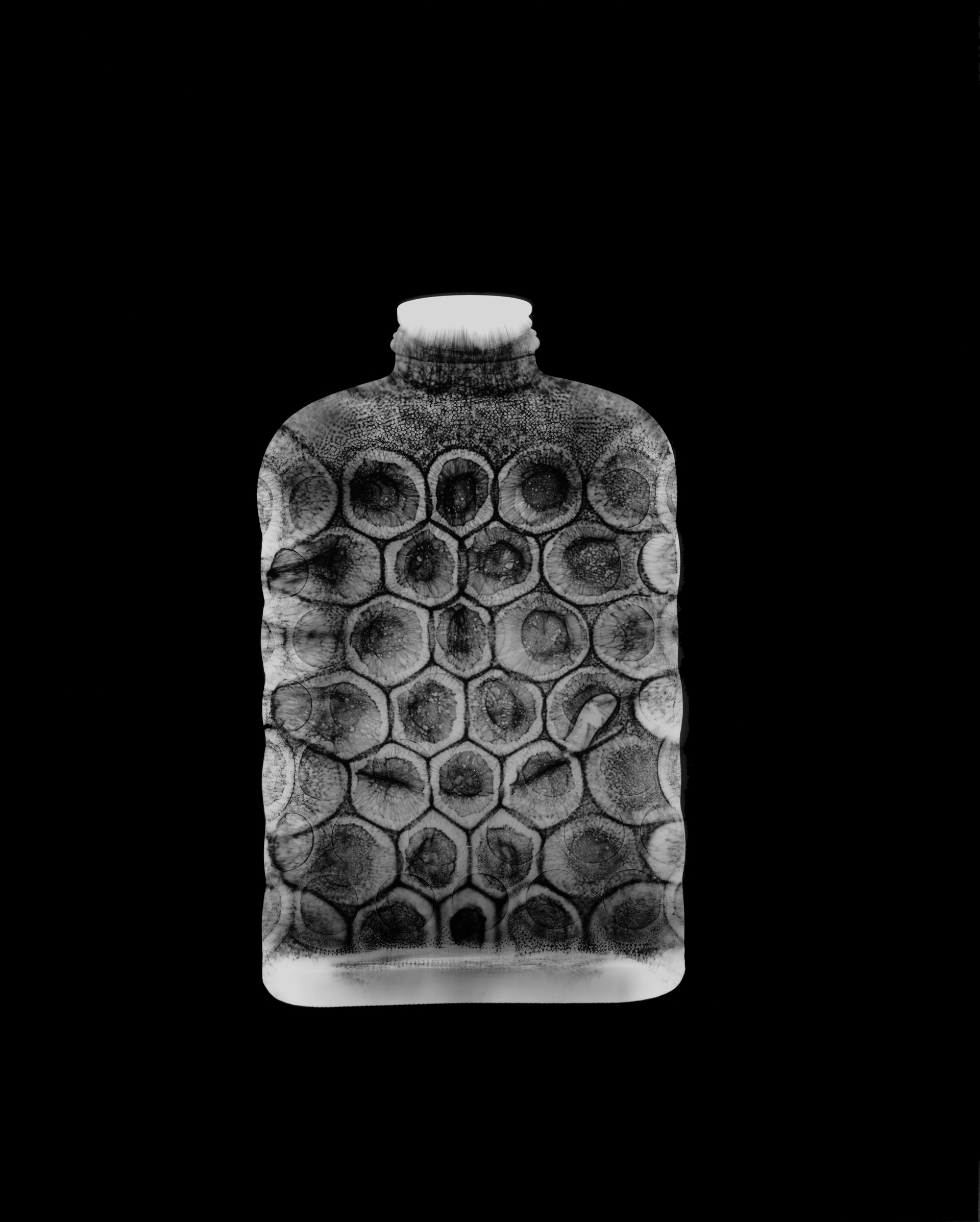
Empty Bottle No. 3 gelatin-silver photogram 1998

Hays' work is in the permanent collections of the following institutions:

- The New York Public Library Spencer Collection New York City
- Mills College Library Heller Rare Book Room Oakland, California
- Museum of Fine Arts Houston, Texas
- Prentice and Paul Sack Trust San Francisco, California
- Santa Barbara Museum of Art Santa Barbara, California
- Stanford University Cecil H. Green Library Stanford, California (major acquisition)
- University of California Berkeley Environmental Design Library
- Yale Art Gallery New Haven, Connecticut
- Yale Haas Book Art Collection New Haven, Connecticut
- Yale Beinecke Library of American Literature New Haven, Connecticut
- Getty Research Institute, Special Collections, Santa Monica, California
