= Halpert =

Halpert is a Norman French surname which varied from the French surname Halbert, and ultimately derives from the Germanic masculine name Adelbert. It may refer to:

== People ==
- Edith Halpert (1900–1970), Russian-born American art dealer and collector
- Herbert Halpert (1911–2000), American anthropologist and folklorist
- Jean Halpert–Ryden (née Jeanette Muriel Halpert; 1919–2011), American visual artist
- Jeremy de Halpert (born 1947), British naval officer and politician
- Samuel Halpert (1884–1930), Russian-born American painter
- Shmuel Halpert (born 1939), Romanian-born Israeli rabbi and politician
- Violetta Maloney Halpert (1919–2009), American folklorist, researcher, and US naval officer

== Fictional characters ==
- Characters from the U.S. television sitcom The Office:
  - Betsy Halpert
  - CeCe Halpert
  - Gerald Halpert
  - Jim Halpert
  - Pam Halpert (née Beesly)
  - Peter Halpert
  - Philip Halpert
  - Thomas Halpert
