= Rinehart School of Sculpture =

Program of the Maryland Institute College of Art

The Rinehart School of Sculpture is the MFA granting sculpture program of the Maryland Institute College of Art (MICA) located in Baltimore, Maryland. It was ranked in 2016 as the #3 MFA degree program in the country for sculpture by U.S. News & World Report.

When the American sculptor William Henry Rinehart died in 1874, he left most of his estate in trust for the purpose of "aiding in the promotion of a more highly cultivated taste for art among the people of my native State, and of assisting young men in the study of the art of sculpture who desire to make it a profession." Originally administered by the Peabody Institute, the Rinehart School of Sculpture opened in 1896 under MICA's leadership. In his name MICA established the Rinehart School of Sculpture and a Rinehart fellowship.

Notable alumni include Hans Schuler (1899), Elizabeth Turk (1994), Doug Hall (1969), and Mary Miss (1968). Notable faculty include Raymond Puccinelli (Dean, and sculpture instructor starting in 1958). Past Directors of Rinehart have included J. Maxwell Miller (1923–1933), Hans Schuler (1925–1951), Tylden Streett (Acting Director 1960-1961), Norman Carlberg (1961-1998), and Maren Hassinger (1998–2018). The previous director was Jann Rosen-Queralt.

Dolores Zinny was appointed Rinehart School of Sculpture MFA in August 2021.
