= Elizabeth Turk =

American artist

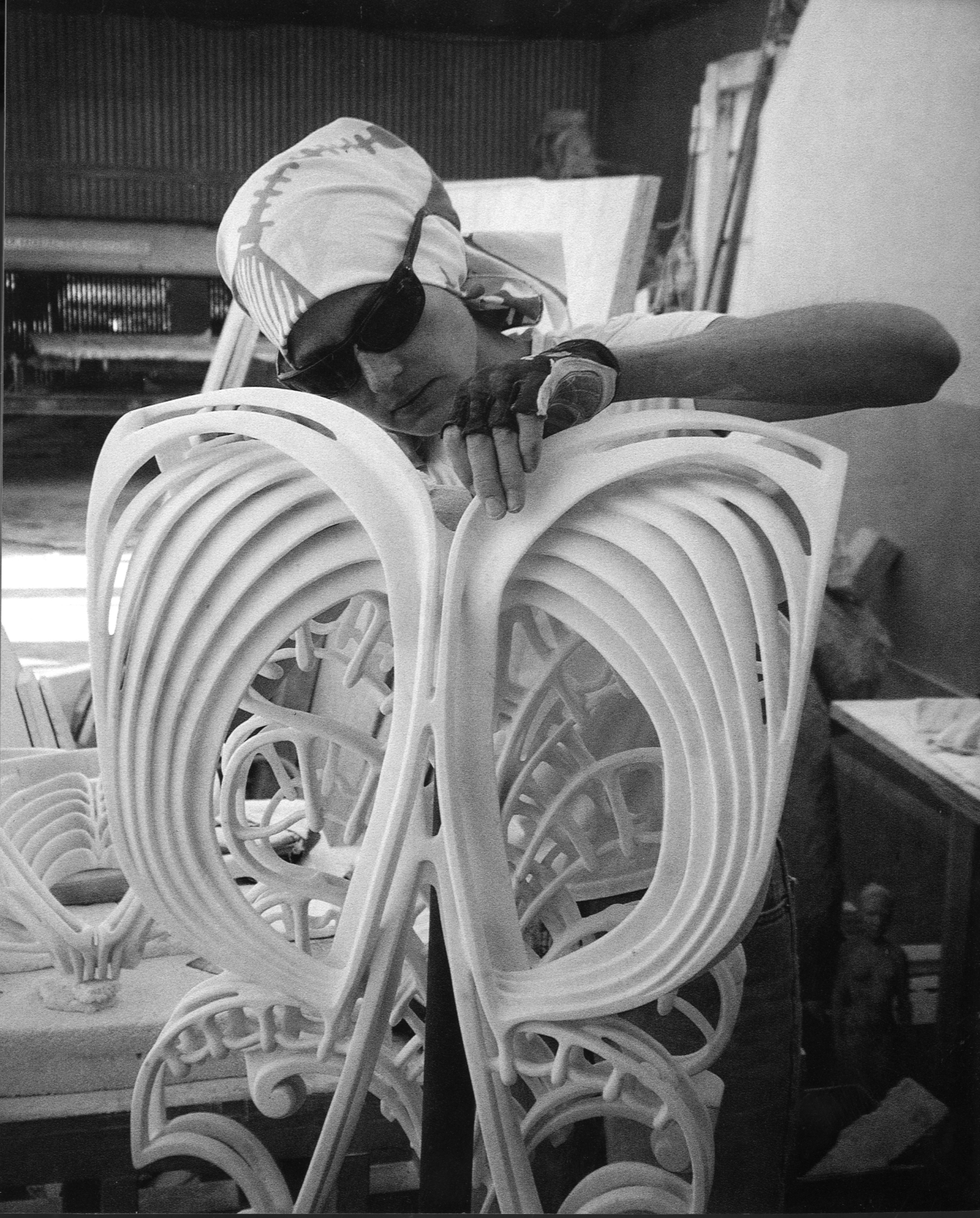
- Born: 1961 (age 64–65); California
- Education: Scripps College, Rinehart School of Sculpture
- Known for: sculpture, manipulated photography, community installations
- Awards: MacArthur Foundation Fellowship, Smithsonian Artist Research Fellowship, Barnett & Annalee Newman Foundation Fellowship, Joan Mitchell Foundation Grant, NYC Art Commission Award for Excellence in Design
- Website: elizabethturkstudios.com

Elizabeth Turk (born 1961) is an artist and native Californian known for her marble sculptures and community installations. She splits time between a studio in Santa Ana, CA and NYC, where she has been represented by Hirschl & Adler Modern since her first exhibition in 2000. She is a MacArthur Fellow, a Smithsonian Artist Research Fellow, an Annalee & Barnett Newman Foundation and Joan Mitchell Foundation grant recipient, among other awards.

== Biography ==
Turk received her BA from Scripps College in 1983 and her MFA from the Rinehart School of Sculpture at the Maryland Institute College of Art in 1994. She launched the CA non-profit ET Projects Foundation in 2017 to launch community-based art experiences such as “Shoreline Project” and “Tipping Point.”

In her studio practice, her work explores the tension of co-existing, yet opposing realities. Boundaries and definitions are revealed in this impossible paradox, for instance: the absence in the present, the contemporary in the traditional, the lightness in weight, the emptiness in mass, the fluidity of the solid, the long narrative of moments. The sculptures defy gravity. Drawing inspiration from the natural world, she continually develops and recycles concepts of elegant organic structures in her sketchbooks.

With ET Projects, Turk draws on many themes from her sketchbook through community audience participation. The large-scale 'moving' installations aim to create serendipitous collective memories, reminding the public of their potential for civic optimism and community balance.

== Works ==
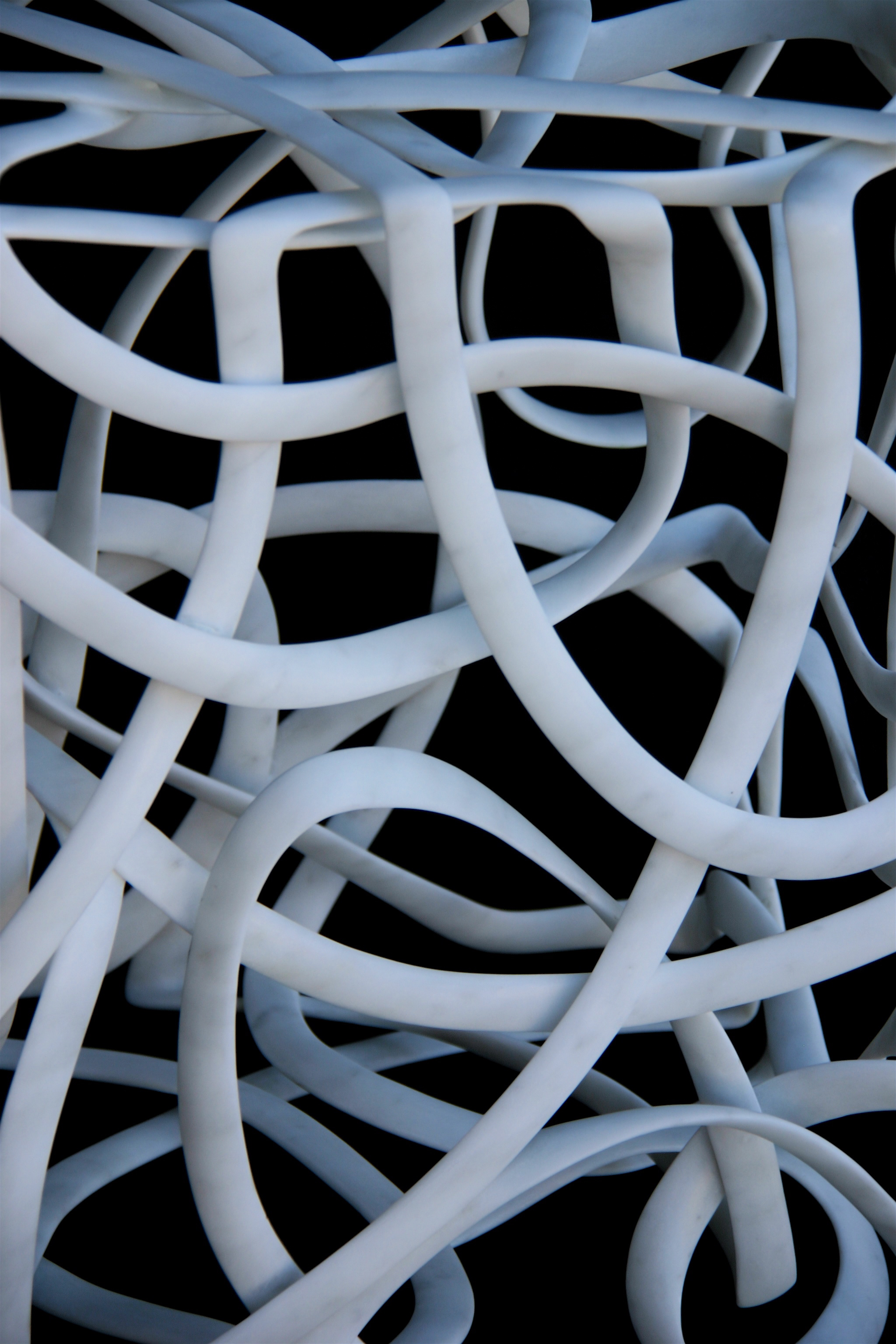
Marble Cage 7-Elizabeth Turk

Studio practice

Asked about her choice of medium, Turk said that "marble found me. It is intrinsically beautiful and holds great history. Maintaining a contemporary voice in this traditional material is daunting. But marble is the pathway to connect my work to the past, to a larger story– human and geological...It's not an accident that I read the earth like a novel. I want this depth in the artwork I create. This is important– it's humbling. My work carries forward more than my singular vision, because of this history."

Community installations

Shoreline Project premiered on November 3, 2018 in partnership with the Laguna Art Museum's annual Art & Nature Festival and the City of Laguna Beach. 1,000 participants moved with LED-lit umbrellas along the edge of the Pacific. Filmed by drones, the production aimed to depict the individual participants coming together as one form.

Tipping Point, ET Projects’ second production, premiered summer 2019 at the Catalina Island Museum. Inspired by the sounds of extinct birds (recordings archived at the Macaulay Library at the Cornell Lab of Ornithology), Turk developed an alphabet of symbols and participatory moments. The objective of the opening events was to prompt community reflections when facing difficult and overwhelming environmental topics. “Move as if you were the last of a species” was the prompt for the dancers launching the event. Participants lit candles to draw “that which they loved”. Long-exposure photography was used to capture the images drawn by participants.

== Selected exhibitions ==
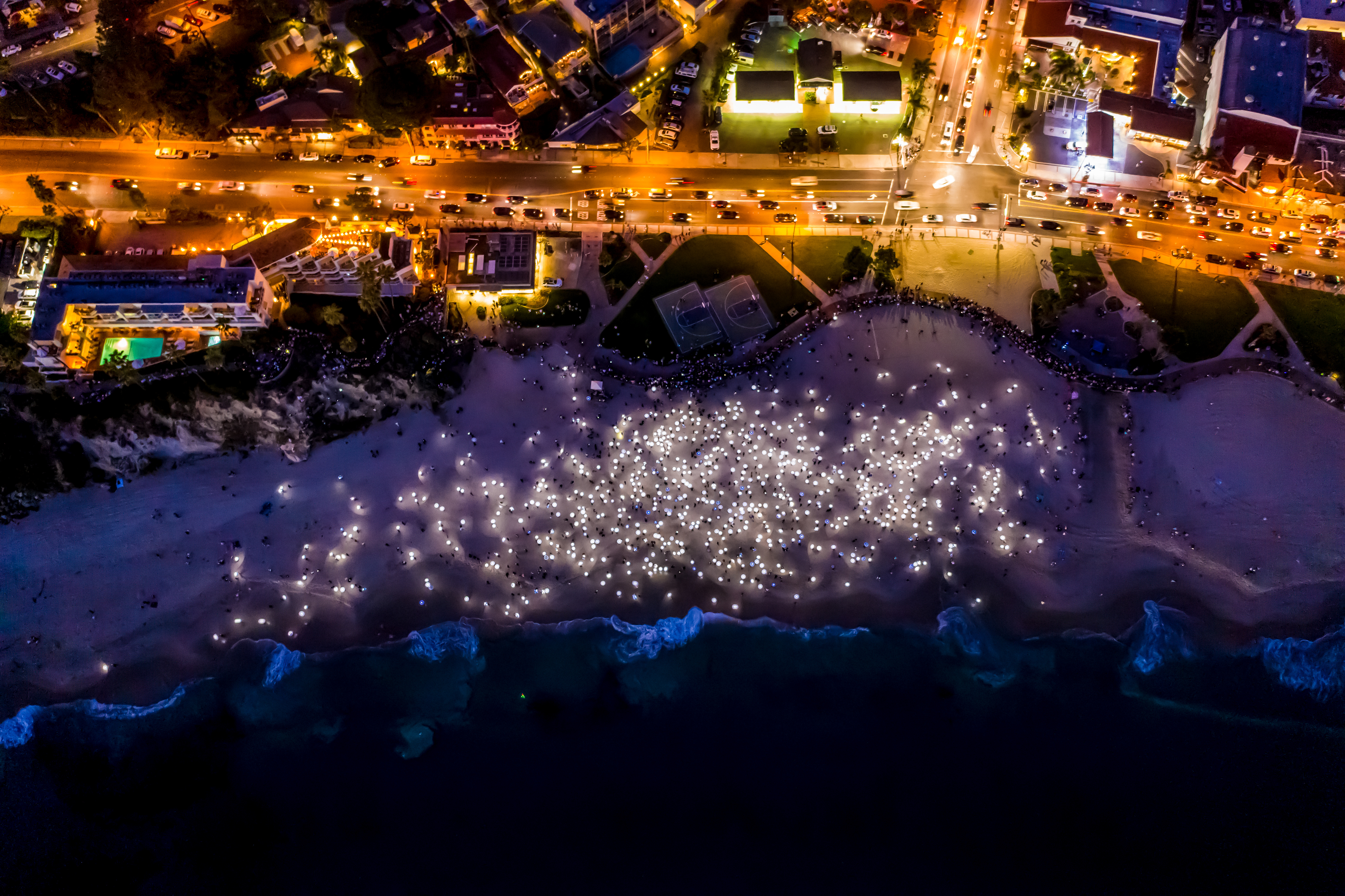
Shoreline Project .01 / Laguna Beach, CA 2018

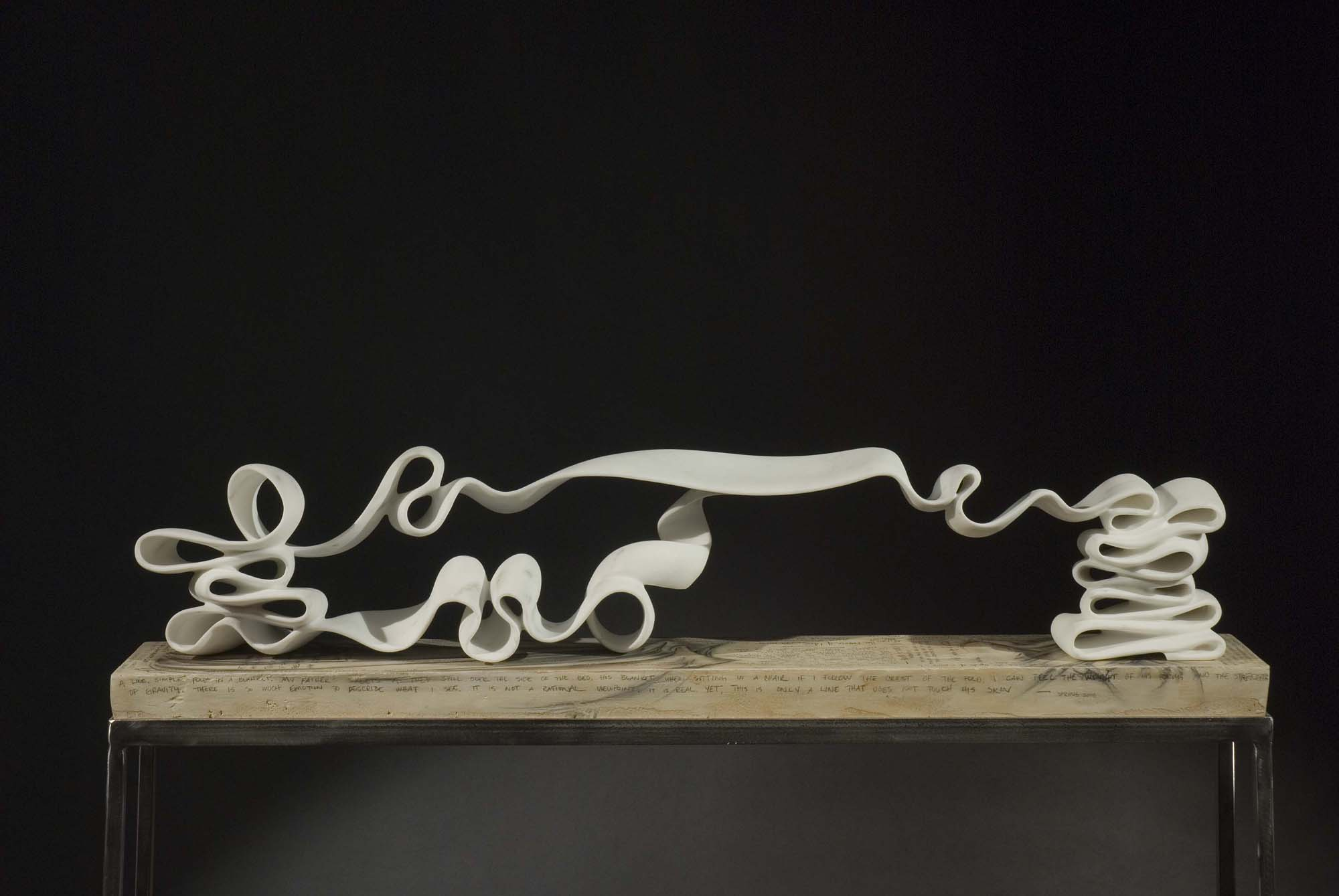

- Tipping Point (2019): ET Studios, a non-profit set up by Elizabeth Turk, and Elizabeth Turk introduce a new body of work Tipping Point. Turk's work on the exhibition Tipping Point began earlier last fall, 2018, during a month-long open studio/live exhibition ThinkLab LIVE .002 with Director of The Frank Doyle Arts Pavilion Tyler Stallings, at Orange Coast College. Highlighting various attributes of this continents’ birds, Turk developed an alphabet of symbols. Using these unique symbols, she explores the greater concept – Extinction. Tipping Point has three elements:
  - 1- Echoes of Extinction: Inspired by recordings of extinct birds (cataloged by the Ornithology Lab at Cornell University) the sound waves take shape in evocative sculptural, "sound column" forms, juxtaposing the ephemeral with the eternal.
  - 2- Migration Patterns: metal mazes laced with imagery are cut to create beautiful interactive moments. Where the audience becomes both victim and aggressor in the fate of our planet.
  - 3- Are We Creating a Silence?: a community, interactive experience where participants investigate the unique personal traces we leave behind.
- Shoreline Project (2018): ET Studios, a non-profit set up by Elizabeth Turk, produces the Shoreline Project as a community event in partnership with Laguna Art Museum. One thousand umbrellas with the image of seashell mandalas are lit using an LED shaft, and carried by volunteers who become the artwork itself. For 2.5 hours, community volunteers and 8 to 10 dance groups move to drum beats as the sun sets on Laguna Beach, CA.
- Tensions (2015): the series juxtaposes carving with found natural elements such as worn river stones and wood in order to explore the inherent tensions between human temperament and the natural world.
- Script (2014): a memorial to hand writing itself, lost in the overwhelming rise of the keyboard. This series is an elegant reminder of the direct calligraphic line of cursive.
- Nature Memorial - Wings (2013): a series of five life-sized broken wings, made from Yule marble originally quarried for the Lincoln Memorial in Washington DC. Installed then photographed in abandoned industrial environments surrounding Washington D.C., the work is a symbol for the end of the 20th century of the Platonic idea: "God gives wings to those who can't fly."
- X-Ray Mandalas (2013–present): part of this collection of experimental photography was acquired by the Phyllis and Ross Escalette Permanent Collection of Art and is housed at the Harry and Diane Rinker Health Science Campus at Chapman University. Other pieces from the collection were recently installed at Jacobs Medical Center at UC San Diego Health.
- Cages (2012): artwork carved from a single block of marble into a line outlining the interior space of the once, solid rock. Suspending this marble Möbius strip above a stainless steel structure, the polished interior of the steel reflects the empty state of the block of stone. The material, which is no longer seen, gives weight/meaning to that which remains visible. The works are about paradox, contradictory truths within the same boundaries; absence defining presence, lightness in weight, mass in emptiness, nests in cages, simplicity within complexity, the contemporary within the traditional.
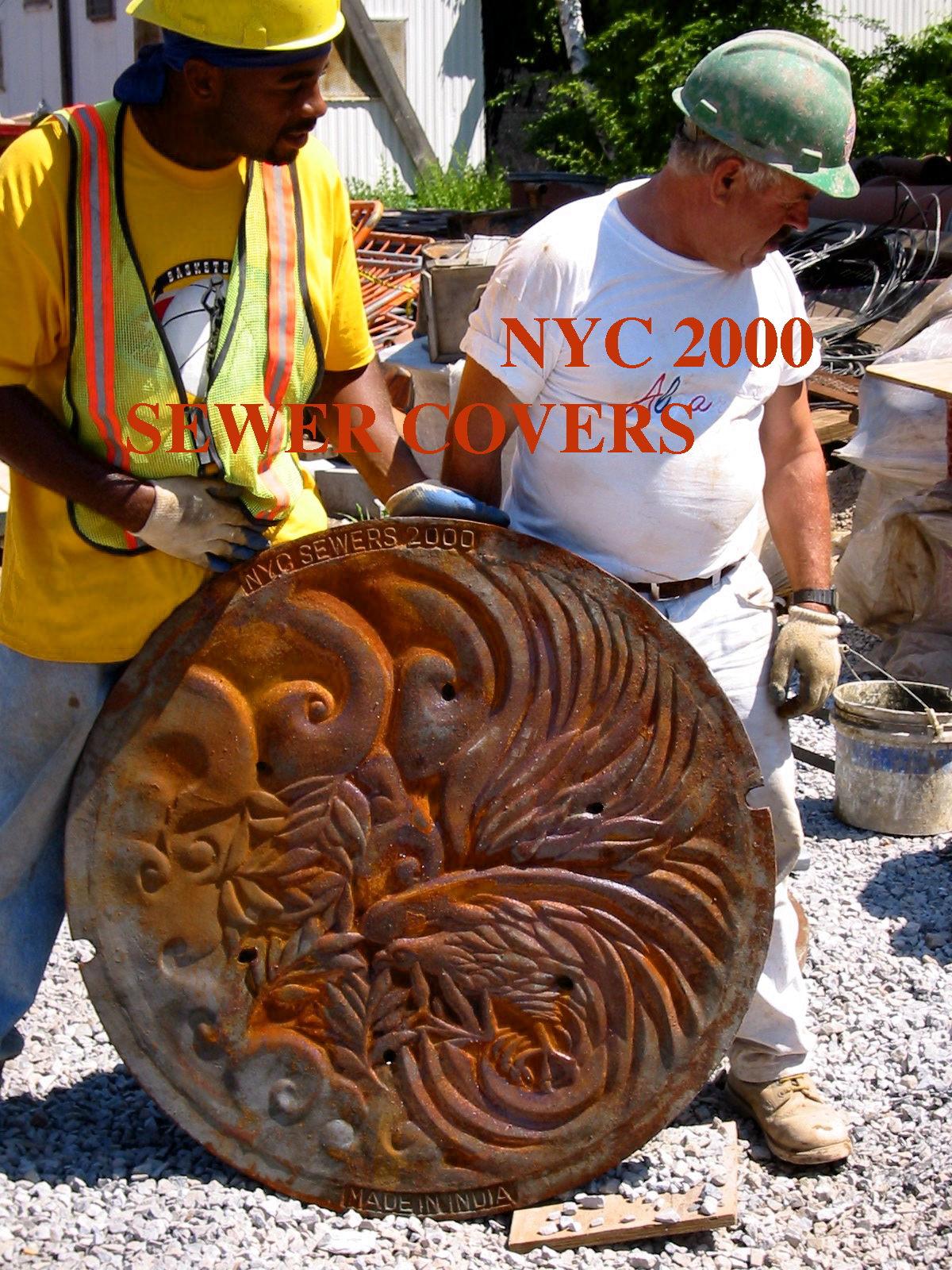
  ManholeCover.ElizabethTurk
- Ribbons and Pinwheels (2008): brings the study of individual shapes together to form extreme curves or "ribbons," particles acting fluidly to defy gravity. This body of work acted as studies for the Cage series.
- Collars (2006): a series built upon studies of essential shapes in natural patterns forming systems that are strong enough to defy gravity and translate into stone matrices. The fragility of this latticework of the collars emphasizes the paradox inherent in the material.
- New York City Manhole Covers (2000): Turk designed manhole covers for Wolfe's Pond Park in Staten Island, New York. Her designs combine the imagery of the Great Blue Heron, Osprey, and plant life on Staten Island, specific to the Staten Island Bluebelt, a natural wetland area that environmentalists are struggling to protect.

Turk's work is also in the collections of the National Museum of Women in the Arts, Washington, D.C.; the Weatherspoon Gallery, University of North Carolina, Greensboro; The Mint Museum, Charlotte, NC; The Treasury of Lichfield Cathedral (UK); and the Los Angeles County Museum of Art. Turk's work has been shown in several solo gallery and museum exhibitions, including, "Elizabeth Turk: Sentient Forms" (2014) at Laguna Art Museum. She has exhibited at the ADAA Art Show, Dayton Art Institute, Dayton Ohio; Ben Maltz Gallery at the Otis College of Art and Design, L.A.; Ruth Chandler Williamson Gallery, Scripps College, Claremont, CA; American Institute of Architecture, New York, N.Y.; and Japan Bank Building, Hiroshima.

== Awards and recognitions ==
Turk is the recipient of many awards and grants, including: a MacArthur genius grant, and the Barnett and Annalee Newman Foundation Fellowship, both in 2010; a Smithsonian Artist Research Fellowship (SARF) in 2011; and a Helena Modjeska Cultural Legacy Award for artistic achievements from Arts Orange County in 2012. She also won a Joan Mitchell Foundation Grant and the NYC Art Commission Excellence in Design Award, both in 2000. She was a 2003 Artist-in-Residence at the McColl Center for Art + Innovation She delivered commencement addresses at Scripps College (2011) and Laguna College of Art & Design (2016). She is featured in the book 50 Contemporary Women Artists, edited by John Gosslee and Heather Zises. In 2019 she delivered the commencement address for VCUarts at Virginia Commonwealth University.
