= William Dathan Holbert =

American serial killer

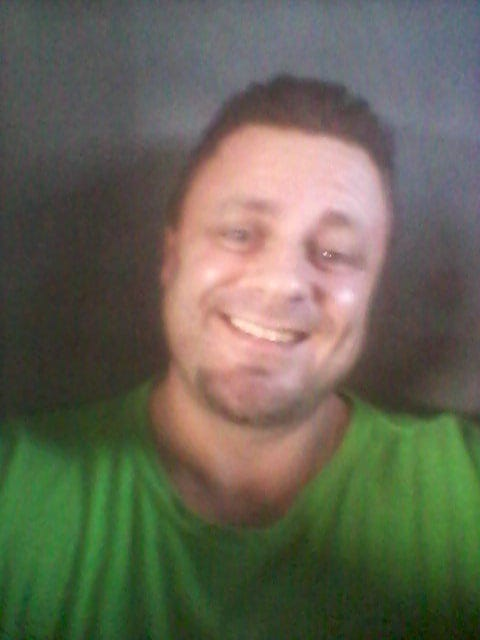
- Holbert in 2020
- Born: William Dathan Holbert; September 12, 1979 (age 47); Saluda, North Carolina, U.S.
- Other name: William Adolfo Cortez
- Conviction: Murder
- Penalty: 47 years

Details
- Victims: 5-6, all in Panama: Michael Francis Salem, alias Mike Brown, an American former drug trafficker who was trying to sell his home; Smith's wife; the Smiths' son; Cher Lynn Hughes, a St. Louis native and small hotel owner; Bo Icelar, a former gallery owner from Santa Fe, New Mexico; Jeffery Kline, lawyer
- Country: Panama
- Date apprehended: July 26, 2010

William Dathan Holbert (born September 12, 1979), alias William Adolfo Cortez and nicknamed "Wild Bill", is an American serial killer/hitman. Originally from North Carolina, he is currently serving a 47-year sentence for the killings of five Americans in Panama.

== Early life ==
Holbert was born on September 12, 1979, in Saluda, North Carolina. Living in the rural mountains of Western North Carolina, Holbert's family owned and managed a small apple orchard and cattle ranch. Holbert attended high school in the neighboring city of Hendersonville, North Carolina. He played high school football and was elected by his teammates as one of two "field generals" or the defensive captain of the team. As a student, Holbert was remembered as gifted, but with an unremarkable grade point average by his teachers. He was also known as a troublemaker. He graduated from North Henderson High School in 1997. He was cited by a game warden in 1996 when he was 17 for illegally hunting on federal land. He was not arrested but was fined and released, but otherwise had no arrests or convictions as a minor.

=== Political activism ===
From 2003 to 2005, Holbert led the Southern National Patriots, a militia and fledgling political party based in Western North Carolina. The group was a controversial conservative activist organization. Members often were seen in uniform on the streets of Forest City, North Carolina. At its height, the organization had 500 active members and acquired a meeting house on Main Street in Forest City. The group was criticized as being a racist organization in 2005 by the local branch of the NAACP. He denied this charge, claiming that several of the group's members were African American. The group collapsed in 2005 when Holbert left the U.S.

== Murder convictions ==
Holbert and his partner (later wife), Laura Michelle Reese, were arrested by authorities as they attempted to make their way into Nicaragua from Costa Rica on July 26, 2010, calling themselves William and Jane Cortez.

Prosecutors said that Holbert confessed to killing five American expatriates in Panama. Prosecutors say Holbert befriended the victims, shot them in the head, and then buried their bodies. One of the victims was "a career criminal with a hand in drug running who escaped from prison". Some sources indicate he confessed to killing a sixth, American lawyer Jeffery A. Kline.

Six years after his confession for the killing of five people in Panama, the Superior Court of Chiriquí Province set a trial date for December 5, 2016. On August 14, 2017, Holbert was sentenced to 47 years and his ex-wife, Reese, was sentenced to 26 years for her role.

=== Appeal ===
Holbert immediately appealed the sentence, citing Panama's 20-year maximum penalty at the time of the murders. His appeal was submitted on January 11, 2018. As of September 2019, the appeal was in process in the Supreme Court of Justice.

== Media coverage ==
In October 2010, an episode of Dateline NBC entitled "Stealing Paradise" investigated the disappearances of Cher Hughes and Bo Icelar, residents of Bocas del Toro, Panama, whose bodies were discovered on Holbert's property.

In 2016, a detailed account of Holbert's crimes written by Nick Foster, The Jolly Roger Social Club: A True Story of a Killer in Paradise, was published.

In January 2019, the Daily Mirror published an exposé on Holbert's supposed existence inside the New Chiriqui Public Prison. The online edition alleged that Holbert enjoys liberal privileges, has access to firearms inside the prison, and feasts on fast food daily. It reported on Holbert's status as the leader of various violent gangs, which Holbert defends as Christian groups. In 2021, Holbert published a controversial memoir about his life in prison, Long Live the King Wild Bill (The Hero is a Villain).

Holbert was criticized by the authorities for publishing photos of prison officials in 2015. The prison system of Panama keeps staff members' names private. Holbert, alleging corruption, published photos of several government functionaries. A corruption scandal ensued in the prison system, and several high-level officials of the now-defunct David Public Prison were fired or sanctioned by the government. Holbert did an interview with the Daily Mirror on January 15, 2019, outlining the conditions of the Panamanian prison systems.

== Prison chaplain ==
Holbert now operates and chairs Los Reos Unificados, a syndicated Christian inmate organization, in Panama. He also operates Panama Human Rights, an international human rights organization for prisoners. In September 2014, Holbert's lawyer issued a statement saying that Holbert had been appointed chaplain of the Catholic Church in the Public Jail of David. In February 2020, Holbert was appointed Pastor and Mediator to the approximately 150 inmates of the super-maximum security wing of the most notorious prison in the Republic of Panama, La Joya. In early 2020, he was appointed pastor of the infamous Sector C in the La Joya Prison Complex. He also acts as the mediator between the various violent gangs of the prison.

== See also ==
- List of serial killers in the United States
