= Jean Halpert–Ryden =

American visual artist (1919–2011)

- Born: Jeanette Muriel Halpert; December 26, 1919; Brooklyn, New York City, New York, U.S.
- Died: March 14, 2011 (aged 91); Santa Rosa, California, United States
- Other names: Jean Halpert, Jean H. Ryden
- Education: Brooklyn College, California College of Arts and Crafts
- Occupation: Visual artist
- Years active: 1945–2000
- Known for: painting, printmaking, drawing, pastels, collage
- Movement: Abstract expressionism, San Francisco Bay Region
- Spouse: Edward Ryden (m. 1947–2011; death)

Jean Halpert–Ryden (née Jeanette Muriel Halpert; 1919–2011) was an American visual artist, active in Northern California. She primarily worked in painting, printmaking, and drawing; and her work was shown internationally. She was married to noted artist and designer, Edward Ryden.

== Early life and education ==
Jeanette Muriel Halpert was born on December 26, 1919, in Brooklyn, to parents Mildred and Abraham Halpert.

She attended Brooklyn College, as well as private art study under stage designer Moi Solotaroff (Morris Moi Solotaroff). In her later life she attended the California College of Arts and Crafts (now the California College of the Arts) to study printmaking and lithography.

== Career ==
Her first exhibition was in 1946 at Norlyst Gallery at 59 West 56th Street in New York City; where she displayed six paintings in a group show. In 1946 and 1947, she travelled around the United States.

She married artist Edward Ryden (1922–2013) in 1947; for two years they lived in Boulder, Colorado, before moving to San Francisco in 1949. She had lived at 778 Kansas Street in the Potrero Hill neighborhood in the 1960s, near artist Ruth Cravath. They also built a second home on the Sonoma Mountain in Sonoma County, California. Jean and her husband Edward moved to Israel in 1985, where she continued to make and display her artwork.

Halpert–Ryden was a member of the San Francisco Art Association, San Francisco Women Artists, and the California Watercolor Society (now the National Watercolor Society); and she had exhibited work with these groups.

== Late life, death, and legacy ==
In 2002, the couple moved back to Northern California when Halpert–Ryden began to experience Alzheimer's disease. In July 2005, she moved into a care home called the Primrose Center in Santa Rosa, California. She died on March 14, 2011, in Santa Rosa, California.

Her work is in public collections and museums, including at the Adam Mickiewicz Museum of Literature, Warsaw; and the collection of the City and County of San Francisco (and San Francisco Arts Commission).

== Exhibitions ==
=== Solo ===
- 1961, solo exhibition, Galerie Mirage, Montpellier, France
- 1962, "The artist looks at peace: paintings by Jean Halpert–Ryden", solo exhibition, St. Mary's College, Moraga, California, U.S.
- 1962, "Paintings, drawings by Jean Halpert–Ryden", solo exhibition, Art Unlimited Gallery, 14 Tillman Place, San Francisco, U.S.
- 1964, "Paintings and collages by Jean Halpert–Ryden", solo exhibition, Harbor Gallery, 577-5th Street, Oakland, California, U.S.
- 1981, "Jean Halpert–Ryden Retrospective", solo exhibition, Monterey Peninsula Museum of Art (now Monterey Museum of Art), 559 Pacific, Monterey, California, U.S.
- 1985, "Jean Halpert–Ryden Retrospective", solo exhibition, Madison Street Gallery, Petaluma, California, U.S.
- solo exhibition, Lucien Labaudt Gallery, 1407 Gough Street, San Francisco, California, U.S.
- solo exhibition, Telegraph Hill Gallery, 491 Greenwich Street, San Francisco, California, U.S.
- solo exhibition, Rotunda Gallery in the City of Paris, San Francisco, California, U.S.
- solo exhibition, Hanson Gallery, Sausalito, California, U.S.
- solo exhibition, Shore Galleries, Boston, Massachusetts, U.S.

=== Group ===
- 1946, group exhibition, Norlyst Gallery, 59 West 56th Street, New York City, New York, U.S.
- 1953, "Richmond Art Center Annual", group exhibition, Richmond Art Center, Richmond, California, U.S.
- 1956, "Richmond Art Center Annual", group exhibition, Richmond Art Center, Richmond, California, U.S.
- 1957, "Richmond Art Center Annual", group exhibition, Richmond Art Center, Richmond, California, U.S.
- 1959, "Paintings by Jean Halpert-Ryden", solo exhibition, Palace of the Legion of Honor (now Legion of Honor), San Francisco, California, U.S.
- 1962, "Richmond Art Center Annual", group exhibition, Richmond Art Center, Richmond, California, U.S.
- 1968, "Edward Ryden and Jean Halpert-Ryden", two person exhibition, Brick Wall Gallery, 1652 Shattuck Avenue, Berkeley, California, U.S.
- 1968, "Small Works", group exhibition, The Artists Equity Association, Civic Center, Richmond, California, U.S.; featuring Halpert–Ryden, Edward Ryden, Jacob Arnautoff, Myrtle Auerbach, Lucille Austin, Priscilla Birge, Adele Chase, Ruth Chatfield, Gail Cole-Hough, James Coughlin, Eleanor Dickinson, Edna Drews, Charles Griffen Farr, Ethel Guttman, Jerry Jolley (or Jeri Jolley), Dorothy Sovinsky-Kaufman, Mark Luca, Helen Ludwig, Roxanne Marden, Otis Oldfield, Kenneth Potter, Liesel Rosenthal, Helen Salz, James Southard, Stefanie Steinberg, Catherine Fasques, Lynne Zelinsky, Ulrich Zuckerman, and Robert Holdeman
- 1971, "Four Artists", group exhibition, Richmond Art Center, Richmond, California, U.S.; featuring Halpert–Ryden, Olive Ayhens, John Gauld, and Gary Smith
- 1971, "Special Exhibit", group exhibition, Hilda Pertha's Old Post Office Gallery, 622 Main Street, Mendocino, California, U.S.
- 1986, group exhibition, Santa Rosa City Council Chambers, Santa Rosa, California, U.S.
