= Raymond Puccinelli =

American sculptor

- Born: May 5, 1904; San Francisco, California, U.S.
- Died: May 7, 1986 (aged 82); Florence, Italy
- Other names: Raimondo Puccinelli, Raimond Puccinelli, Raymond W. Puccinelli, Raimondo Giuseppe Puccinelli
- Education: California School of Fine Arts, Rudolph Schaeffer School of Design
- Employer(s): University of California, Berkeley, Mills College, Queens College, Rinehart School of Sculpture
- Spouse(s): Dorothy Wagner (divorce), Esther Cecilia Fehlen
- Children: 1
- Parents: Antonio Giovanni Puccinelli (father); Pearl Andreson (mother)

Raymond Puccinelli, also known as Raimondo Puccinelli (1904–1986), he was an American sculptor and educator. He was active in his work in San Francisco, Baltimore, and Florence, Italy.

== Early life ==
Raymond Puccinelli was born on May 5, 1904, in San Francisco, California, his early childhood home was on Jessie Street in the neighborhood of South of Market. His father Antonio (or Antone) Giovanni Puccinelli was Italian from Lucca, and his mother Pearl (née Andreson) had Swedish heritage. He attended Lowell High School. Starting at age 15, he started attended theatre classes at University of California, Berkeley on a scholarship and he learned about writing plays and designing stages.

== Career ==
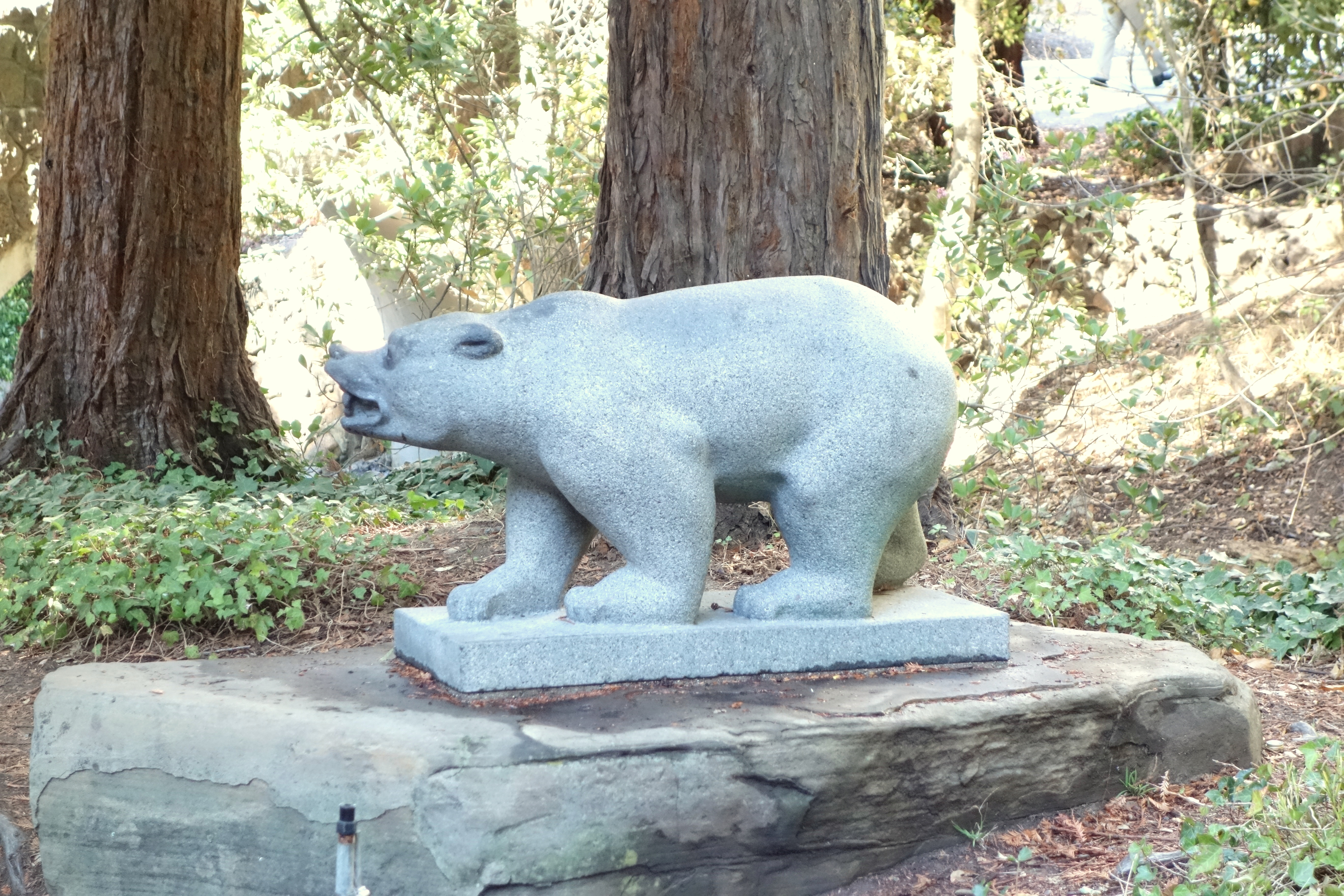
Grizzly Bear (1955) by Puccinelli

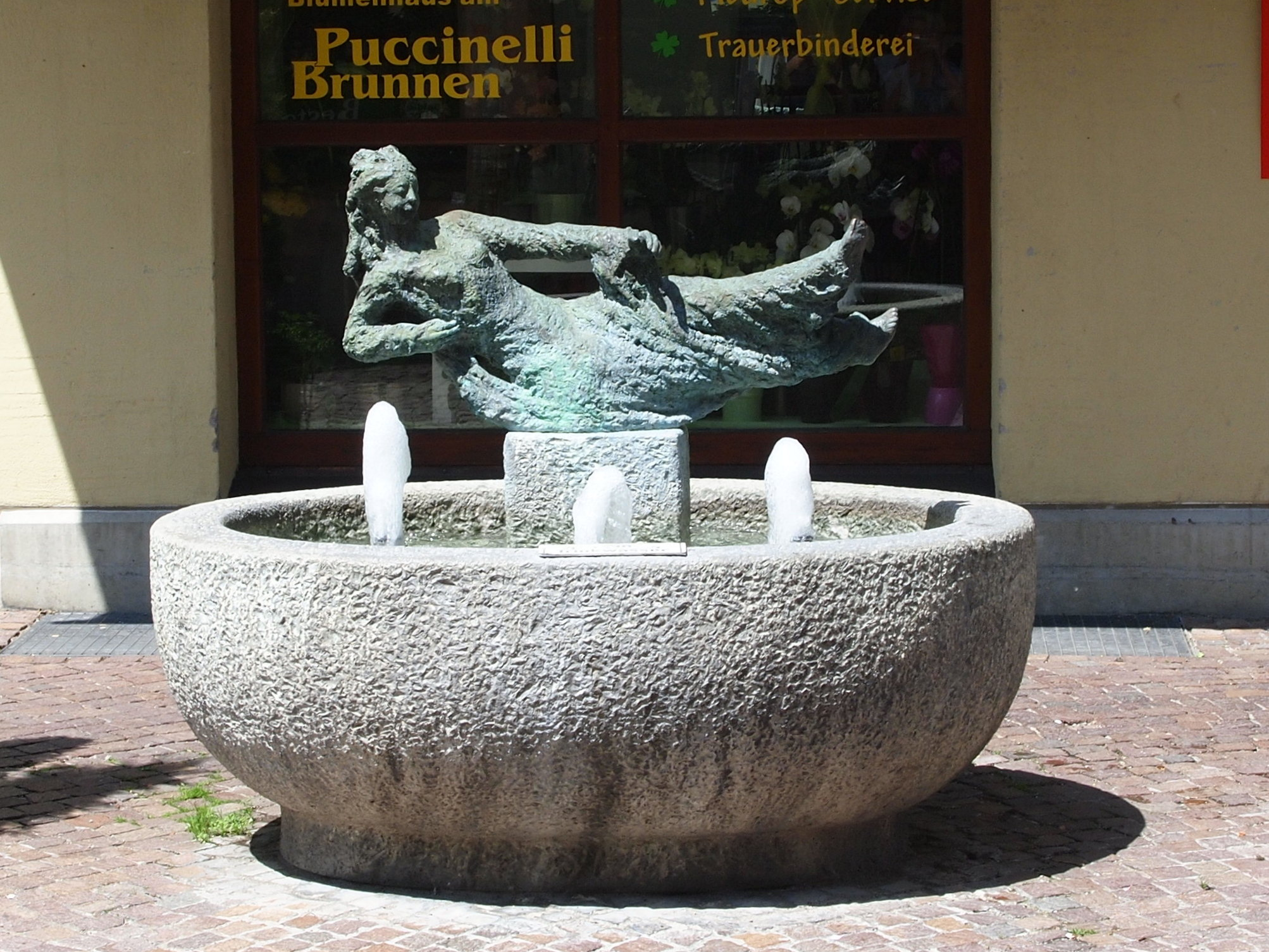
Floating (1984) by Puccinelli

Puccinelli studied fine arts at California School of Fine Arts (now San Francisco Art Institute), and at the Rudolph Schaeffer School of Design. In 1927, Puccinelli travelled to Lucca, Italy for a year to study further sculptural training and Italian art history (specifically Romanesque, Gothic, and late Renaissance sculpture). When he returned to San Francisco, he studied under Jorge Vieira and Beniamino Bufano.

In the 1940s, he had an art studio in Chinatown, San Francisco at 15 Hotaling Place. He had shared studio space with Diego Rivera, where he was able to meet Fernand Léger and Oskar Kokoschka. Puccinelli taught sculpture at University of California, Berkeley (UC Berkeley), and periodically at Mills College.

In 1948, Puccinelli moved to Flushing, Queens in New York to teach at Queens College. The following year in 1949, Puccinelli had a retrospective exhibition at Philadelphia Art Alliance. In 1957, Puccinelli toured South America as a cultural representative of the United States Department of State. He taught at the Rinehart School of Sculpture, where he became Dean in October 1958.

In 1960, Puccinelli moved to Florence, where he worked in a studio in Piazza Donatello 18. In Europe, he used the name "Raimondo Puccinelli".

== Public art ==
- Guglielmo Marconi Memorial Plaque (1938), Lombard Street, North Beach, San Francisco.
- Panther (1940), Hartnell College, Salinas, California, this piece was created with support from the Federal Art Project.
- Grizzly Bear (1955), UC Berkeley, Berkeley, California.
- Floating (1984), fountain Kaufbeuren, Germany.

== Personal life ==
In the 1930s, he had been married to artist Dorothy Wagner Puccinelli, which ended in divorce.

He had regularly sketched dancers in the 1930s and 1940s and he eventually married a dancer, Esther Cecilia Fehlen in the 1940s. Together with Fehlen, they had one daughter.
