= Beniamino Bufano =

American sculptor

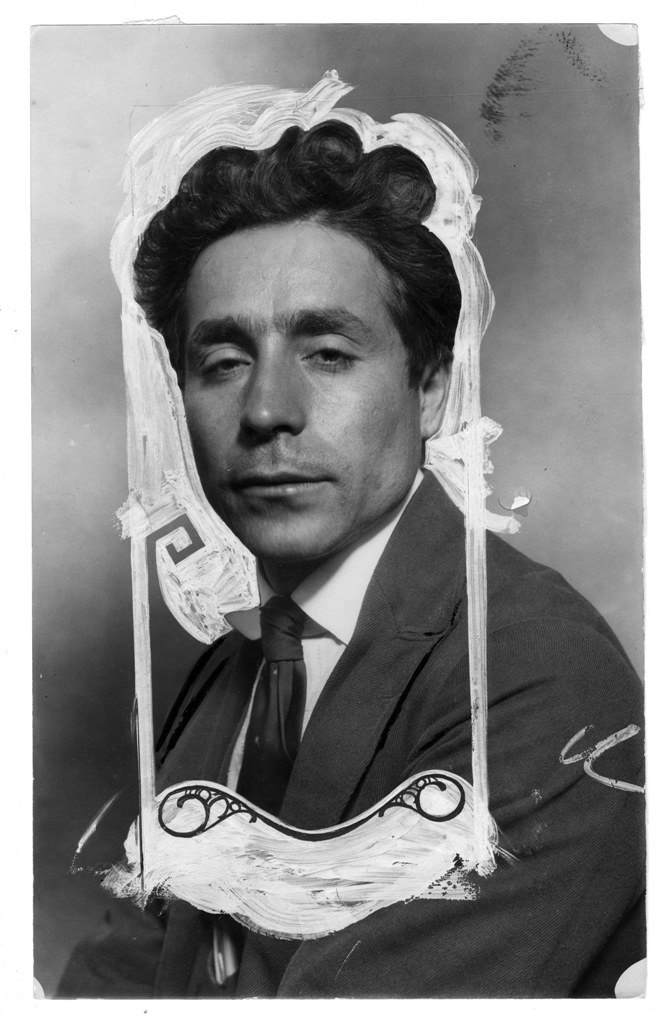
- Bufano in San Francisco, 1923
- Born: Beniamino Benevento Bufano; October 15, 1890; San Fele, Italy
- Died: August 18, 1970 (aged 79); San Francisco, California, U.S.
- Resting place: Holy Cross Cemetery, Colma, California, U.S.
- Other names: Bene Bufano, Benny Bufano, Ben Bufano, Benvenuto Bufano
- Occupations: Artist, Sculptor
- Spouses: Marie Jones Linder, Virginia Howard Lewin
- Children: 2

Beniamino "Bene" Bufano (October 15, 1890 – August 18, 1970) was an Italian American sculptor, best known for his large-scale monuments representing peace and his modernist work which often featured smoothly rounded animals and relatively simple shapes. He worked in ceramics, stone, stainless steel, and mosaic, sometimes combining two or more of these media; some of his works are cast stone replicas. He used a variety of names and sometimes went by the name Benvenuto Bufano because he admired Benvenuto Cellini. His youthful nickname was "Bene," which was often anglicized into "Benny." He lived in northern California for much of his career.

== Early life ==
Bufano was born in San Fele, Italy. He came to the United States in 1901, with his mother and siblings. The family eventually settled down in New York when Bufano was still young. One source says Bufano's was one of eleven siblings who came the U.S.; another source puts the figure at sixteen; Bufano once said he was one of fifteen children.

The date of Bufano's birth is uncertain. The year 1890, attributed here, appears on Bufano's death certificate and grave. Yet his birth year is variously cited between 1886 and 1898. It is equally difficult to determine the accuracy of many of the stories Bufano told about his life. Although a 1972 biography by Howard Wilkening and Sonia Brown is based on interviews with the artist and extensive research, it is not conclusive. As the artist admitted, "I just told each person not only what I thought he wanted to hear, but I related it in the way I thought appropriate for him." Another biography, published ten years after Bufano's death by his ex-wife Virginia Howard Lewin, includes many stories she would have heard from him. As she wrote, "Benny revived lying, made it an art and a way of life, a way to get along in a cockeyed world. Yet lying is a misleading word to explain the thought processes of the little artist. If he lied, he was not aware of being dishonest—he was nonmoral, like a child." The only biography with footnotes is the limited-edition volume by Lois Rather published in 1975 and focusing on Bufano's dealings with the federal government.

He studied at the Art Students League of New York during 1913–1915 with sculptors Herbert Adams, Paul Manship, and James Earle Fraser and assisted them with their work; he also assisted Gertrude Vanderbilt Whitney (Mrs. Harry Payne Whitney) at her home studio in Roslyn, New York in about 1913. The relationship ended abruptly as Bufano, charged with making maquettes from Mrs. Whitney's sketches, consistently altered them to his own design. After he ignored several requests to reproduce the sketches as they were, Mrs. Whitney lost patience and smashed Bufano's versions of her sculptures on the floor. He resigned on the spot.

== Career ==
In the fall of 1914, Paul Manship invited Bufano to work with Robert Treat Paine on a commission Manship had received for the 1915 Panama-Pacific International Exposition. Bufano rented a room in San Francisco's Chinatown, made some friends there, and became fascinated with Chinese art. He was given additional sculpture projects at the exposition, panels for the Arches of Triumph and a festoon over the main door of the Palace of Fine Arts.

After returning to New York in 1915, Bufano entered a nationwide art competition and exhibit on the theme "The Immigrant in America". Gertrude Vanderbilt Whitney funded the contest, and the exhibit was held in the Whitney Studio Club at 8 West 8th Street in Greenwich Village, which Whitney established to exhibit the work of young artists. The Immigrants in America Review administered the contest. Frances Kellor, who had been top committeewoman in former President Theodore Roosevelt's Progressive Party, headed the Review. Roosevelt visited the exhibit of the 100 works entered in the contest, which added to its prestige and the acclaim of its prize winners. Bufano, then a virtual unknown in the art world (although known to Mrs. Whitney), won the first prize of $500 with a sculpture, titled The Group, depicting more than a dozen bowed figures, headed by a child. The New York Times reported on Roosevelt's visit to the exhibit. Roosevelt used the occasion to inveigh against cubist art, but singled out "Bennie" Bufano's prize-winning sculpture for praise. "Wonderful work", he exclaimed to the Times, "I should like to meet the sculptor."

Shortly after the United States entered World War I in 1917, Bufano accidentally cut off half of his right index finger. He decided to mail the "trigger finger" to President Woodrow Wilson as a protest against the war. He allowed a legend to develop that he had intentionally severed the finger for this purpose.

Later in 1917 he returned to California and rented a studio in Pasadena, where he sculpted portrait heads and took philosophy classes. But he decided San Francisco was where he most wanted to live, and it became his home base for the rest of his life, although he would travel extensively.

In 1918 he met Sara Bard Field and Charles Erskine Scott Wood, who became important patrons of his work. They provided him with a studio, commissioned sculptures, and funded a trip to China for the artist to study glazes. Albert M. Bender was another early patron who helped Bufano financially and acquired works by the artist that he donated to the San Francisco Museum of Modern Art. A portrait head of Bender by Bufano is also in the museum collection.

Bufano traveled to China in 1920, encountering the poet Witter Bynner and working on a portrait head of Bynner en route. He apprenticed himself to a master potter to learn about glazes, as planned, but he extended his stay and traveled around the country, meeting Sun Yat-sen and John Dewey. Although he said he spent much of the journey living in poverty, he returned after about two years with a valuable collection of Chinese art.

In 1923, he was hired to teach at the California School of Fine Arts (now known as San Francisco Art Institute) but had too many disagreements with the administration about how art should be taught and was dismissed at the end of the semester. He proceeded to open his art school, the Da Vinci Art School, in the Hawaiian Building on the 1915 exposition grounds, but it closed within months. One of Bufano's students was Raymond Puccinelli. Around this time he created some site-specific art for the country home of Wood and Field in Los Gatos, California.

In 1925, Bufano had a solo show at the Arden Galleries in New York City, he was featured in International Studio magazine, and the Metropolitan Museum of Art acquired his ceramic sculpture Honeymoon Couple. That year he also met Virginia Howard in San Francisco, fell in love, followed her when she went to Louisiana and married her in Texas. They spent a few weeks in Pasadena and then embarked on a trip around the world, visiting Japan, China, Southeast Asia, and India, then Italy and France. By the time they arrived in France the marriage was failing, and when she became pregnant, he sent her home to California. The baby was born on August 16, 1928, and Virginia named him Erskine Scott Bufano after their benefactor Charles Erskine Scott Wood. She learned that her husband had earlier had a common-law wife named Marie Jones (née Linder) and a daughter named Aloha M. Jones-Bufano. She divorced him in 1931.

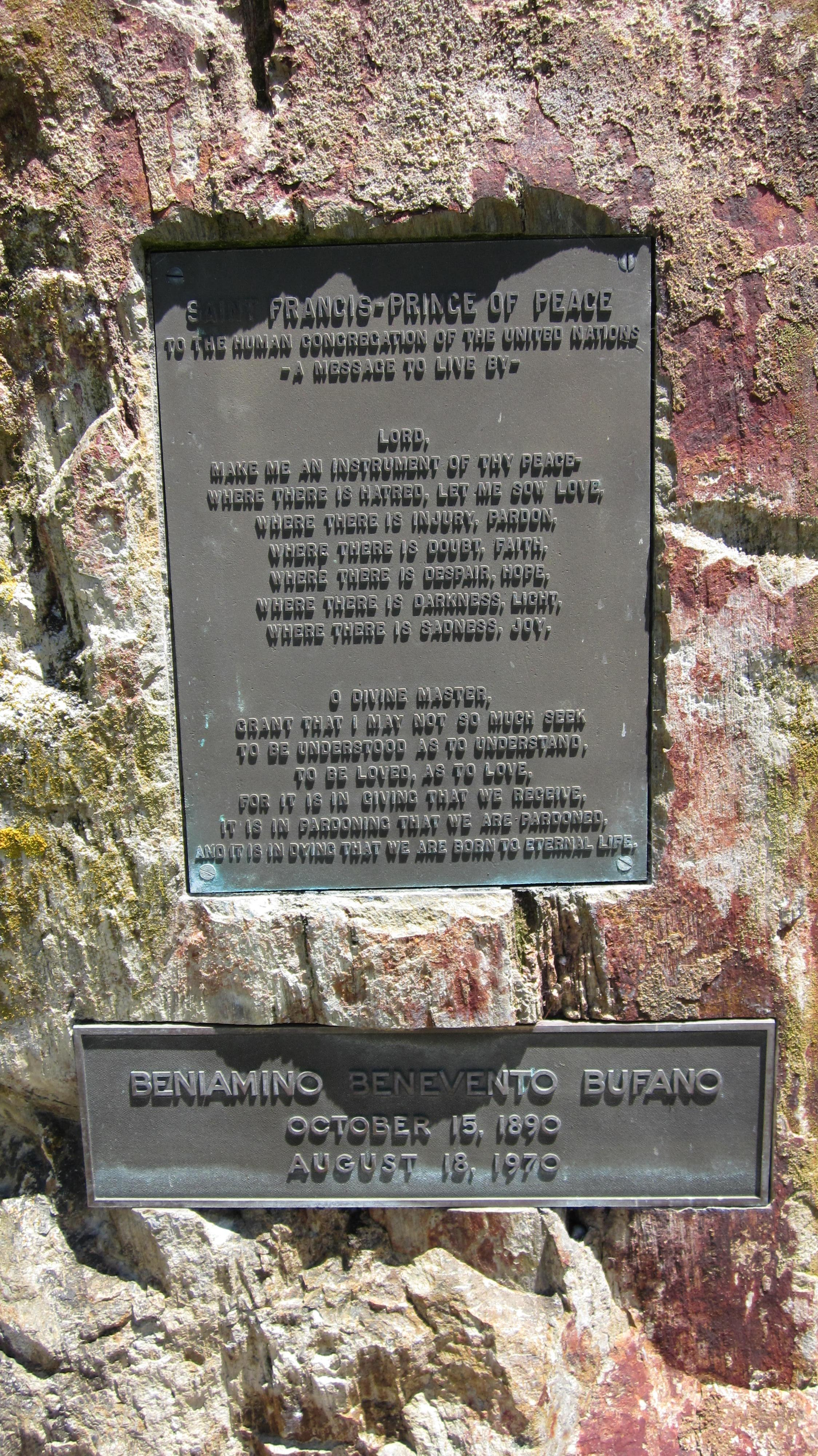
Plaques above Bufano's grave in Holy Cross Cemetery in Colma, California.

Bufano spent close to four years in France, where he bought a large block of stone and carved a statue of St. Francis of Assisi, which he intended as a gift to the city of San Francisco Once it was finished, the Depression was underway, aesthetic objections were raised by San Franciscans who saw photographs of the work, and more than two decades were to pass before enough money was raised to ship it to California.

He became a naturalized U.S. citizen in November 1938.

Back in San Francisco during the 1930s, he received studio space, a salary, and assistants through the Federal Art Project. He created several animal sculptures for the new Aquatic Park. He also made drawings and models for a 156-foot-tall St. Francis to sit on top of a high hill. It was approved by the city art commission, but it became an object of controversy and ridicule and was never erected. He was commissioned to design a block-long sculptural frieze of athletes for George Washington High School in San Francisco, but then was accused of including likenesses of Joseph Stalin and Harry Bridges. He denied this charge but lost the commission, ostensibly because he was taking too long and kept changing the design. He received another federal job in 1940, head of the art division of the National Youth Administration for San Francisco.

Bufano served on the San Francisco Art Commission from 1944 to 1948. A long-term friendship with author and painter Henry Miller began during this time; Miller would advocate on Bufano's behalf and wrote an introduction to a 1968 book on the artist. It was published for the Bufano Society of the Arts, San Francisco, with 115 color and 8 black-and-white illustrations.

In 1950 Bufano created a large mural for Moar's Cafeteria in San Francisco (however it was removed in the 1970s for BART construction). As shown below, examples of his distinctive and large-scale work are found throughout the San Francisco Bay Area. Some of his best-known works are bullet-shaped monuments, including the first sculpture in stainless steel.

Bufano worked in North Beach, and later, South of Market, his rent covered by Trader Vic's owner Victor Bergeron, while living at the Press Club in downtown San Francisco.

== Death and legacy ==
Bufano continued to create art and to be seen locally as a colorful character until his death from heart disease in 1970. In his will he disinherited his daughter Aloha M. Bufano-Jones (1918–1991) and did not mention his son, Erskine Scott Bufano, leaving everything to an entity he and patron friends had established called the Bufano Society of the Arts. Erskine successfully contested the will and became the head of the society. Erskine died in 2010.

Beniamino Bufano is buried at Holy Cross Cemetery in Colma, California.

== Works ==
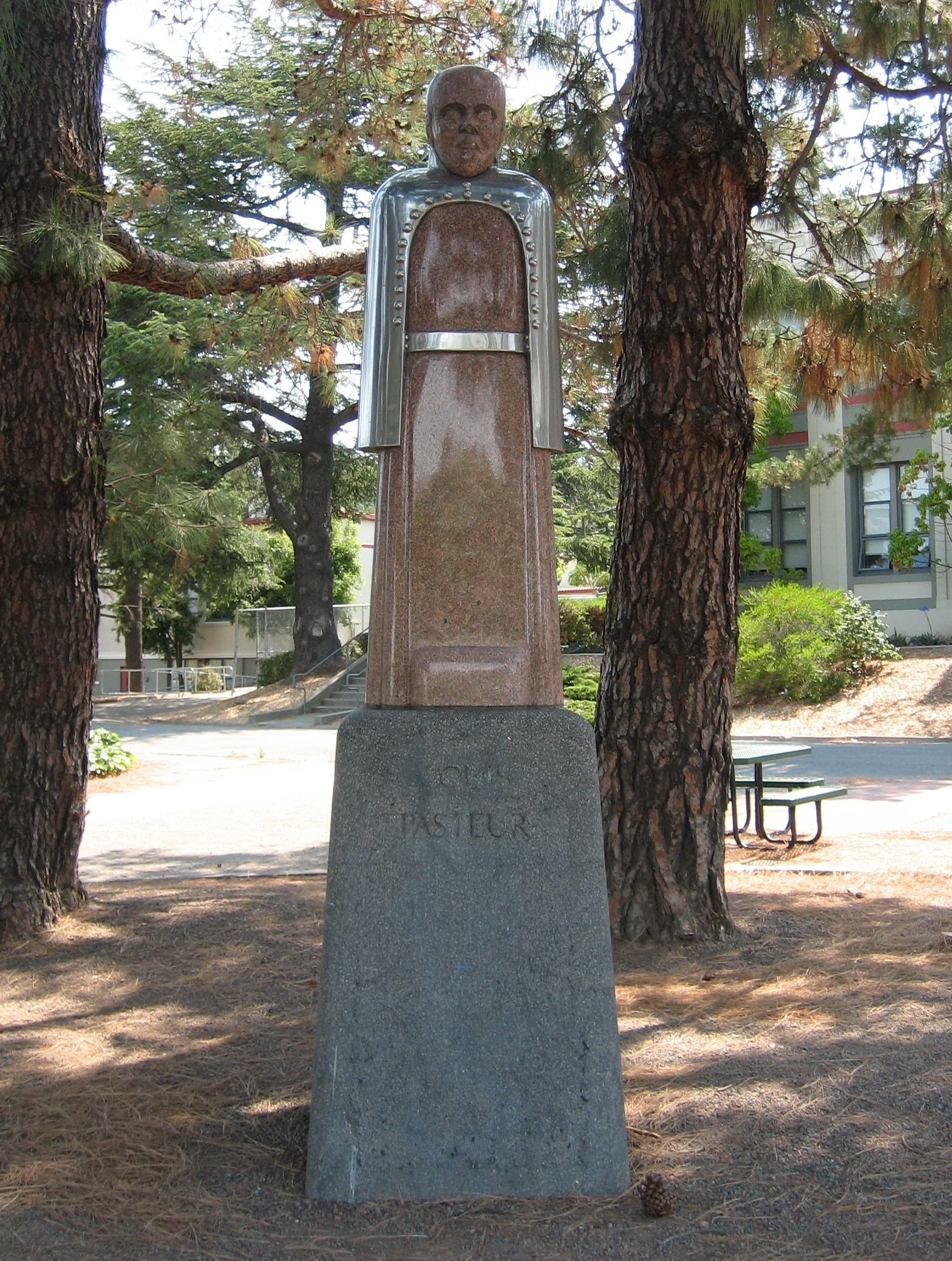
Louis Pasteur statue at San Rafael High School, San Rafael, California (1940)

=== Northern California and San Francisco Bay Area public spaces ===
- Bear Nursing Cubs: outside the Oakland Museum of California, 1000 Oak Street, at 10th Street, in Oakland, California
- Louis Pasteur (1940): 6-foot (1.8 m) work located in the auditorium grove of San Rafael High School, 310 Nova Albion Way, San Rafael, California. The sculpture was the original meeting spot for the individuals who created the 420 cannabis culture meme.
- Johann Sebastian Bach (1942) The sculpture has been exhibited at the Philadelphia Museum of Art, the United Nations, and the Robert Mondavi Winery. Photographer Johan Hagemeyer photographed it in 1943.
- Penguin’s Prayer: located at 39400 Paseo Padre Parkway, Fremont, California
- Owl, Penguin's Prayer and other works: Hillsdale Shopping Center, 60- 31st Avenue, San Mateo, California
- $Dollarocracy$ (1967): probably Bufano's largest extant mosaic ensemble located outside the headquarters of the ILWU, the International Longshore and Warehouse Union, 99 Hegenberger Road, Oakland.
- Hand of Peace (1967): Civic Park, 1375 Civic Dr., Walnut Creek, California.
- Universal Child: An 85-foot (26 m) monument near City Hall, Santa Clara, California.
- Brown Bear (a white bear sculpture): San Jose Center for the Performing Arts, San Jose, California.
- The Bear (1963): A 10-foot (3.0 m) statue located at the Gardner Bullis Elementary School, part of the Los Altos School District, 25890 W Fremont Rd, Los Altos Hills, California.
- Elephant: A 3-foot (0.91 m) red granite sculpture located in the Hearst Art Gallery, Saint Mary's College of California, 1928 Saint Mary's Road, Moraga, California.
- Peace or The Expanding Universe: co-created with Alfonso Pardiñas of Byzantine Mosaics. This 93-foot (28 m) monument overlooks the Pacific coast at Timber Cove Lodge, 21780 California State Route 1, 14 miles north of Jenner, California.
- Bufano sculpture collection, part of the permanent art collection, Robert Mondavi Winery, Oakville, California
- Bear: Ross Town Hall (A gift of Mr. and Mrs. Jerome Flax, 1971), 31 Sir Francis Drake Blvd., Ross, California

==== San Francisco public spaces ====
The numbers on the map and below suggest the shortest route by which a driver (or intrepid cyclist) may visit all of the Bufano sculptures in public spaces of San Francisco.

- 01) Elephant (n.d.): 3-foot (1 m) bronze statue is located at the Museo ItaloAmericano, 2 Marina Blvd., Building C
- 02) Hand of Peace (n.d.): bronze with enamel statue, also at the Museo ItaloAmericano, 2 Marina Blvd., Building C
- 03) Madonna (begun in 1962): almost 14-foot (4.3 m).) high, with a mosaic of young faces, pink, yellow and black. In a film portrait which contains a lengthy segment on creating this mosaic, Bufano states,"The figure of a child. It's a composite figure of all the races." The monument is located in the Great Meadow, Upper Fort Mason; 150 yards north of 1325 Bay Street
- 04) Frog (1942): 16 in (0.41 m) high, this work is located on the balcony of the Maritime Museum, 900 Beach Street.
- 05) Seal (1942): 42 in (1.1 m) high, also located at the Maritime Museum, 900 Beach Street
- 06) St. Francis de la Varenne (1928): this 18-foot (5.5 m) monument is located on the south-east corner of Beach and Taylor Streets, Fisherman's Wharf.
- 07) The Penguin: Golden Gateway Center, 480 Davis Court, near the south-east corner of Davis and Jackson Streets. The work is displayed across the street diagonally from Sydney Walton Square, a sculpture park.
- 08) Sun Yat-sen (1937): Saint Mary's Square, corner of Quincy and California Street. This 12-foot (3.7 m) statue is said to be among Bufano's most famous works.
- 09) The Penguins: entrance to the Stanford Court Hotel, 905 California Street
- 10) St. Francis (1970): Grace Cathedral, 1100 California Street. The black and bronze, 5-foot (1.5 m) tall sculpture was originally located at the St. Francis Hotel but was moved to its current location in 1993.
- 11) St. Francis on Horseback (1935): 8-foot (2.4 m) tall; Westside Courts Housing Project, across from 2550 Sutter, in the courtyard behind the basketball court
- 12) Bear (1930s): University of California, San Francisco, 608 Parnassus Street
- 13) Bear and Cubs (1968): University of California, San Francisco, 530 Parnassus Street
- 14) Female Torso: Eureka Valley/Harvey Milk Memorial Branch Library, 1 Jose Sarria Court; in the front lobby
- 15) Rabbit, Seals, Fish, Bear and Cubs, Cat and Mouse: Valencia Gardens Housing (1930s): in the courtyard next to 33 Maxwell Court.
- 16) The Madonna: San Francisco General Hospital, courtyard at the north-east corner of Potrero Avenue and 22nd Street
- 17) Saint Francis of the Guns (1968); City College of San Francisco, Ocean Campus, between Phelan Avenue and the front entrance to the Science Building. Constructed of melted guns from a voluntary weapons amnesty program in San Francisco, this work was inspired by the 1968 assassinations of Martin Luther King Jr. and Robert F. Kennedy. On the robe of St Francis is a mosaic tile mural of four of America's assassinated leaders: Abraham Lincoln, Martin Luther King Jr., Robert Kennedy and John F. Kennedy.
- 18) Granite Nude Torso [male] (1934): San Francisco State University, courtyard between HSS and the Business Buildings, 1600 Holloway Avenue
- 19) Head of St. Francis (1938): San Francisco State University, main quadrangle, between the Business Building and the Student Center, 1600 Holloway Avenue
- 20) Penguin’s Prayer (1939): 11 Lake Merced Boulevard, west side of the road between Brotherhood Way and John Muir Drive
- 21) Peace (1939): opposite the Calvary Armenian Congregational Church, 725 Brotherhood Way. This 30-foot (9.1 m) monument was relocated to Brotherhood Way in 1996 after nearly four decades at the San Francisco International Airport.
- 22) Bear and Head of Peace (ca. 1935–1940): Sunnydale Projects Community Center, in Visitacion Valley, San Francisco, 1654 Sunnydale Avenue

==== San Francisco museums ====
- Animal sculptures: Randall Museum, 199 Museum Way
- Female Torso and Head of George W. P. Hunt: de Young Museum, 50 Hagiwara Tea Garden Dr., Golden Gate Park
- Animal sculptures: California Academy of Sciences sculpture garden, 55 Music Concourse Dr., Golden Gate Park
- Fourteen works: San Francisco Museum of Modern Art, 151 3rd St.
- St. Francis of Assisi: Museum of Mission San Francisco de Asís (familiarly known as Mission Dolores Museum), 3750 18th St.
- Small Madonna (1968): private collection: gifted to the Alioto family during the wedding of Angela Alioto and Adolpho Veronese in San Francisco

=== Outside of California public spaces ===
- Bear and Cubs: Kauikeaouli Hale district courthouse in Honolulu, Hawaii
- The Owl: Timberland Regional Library of Aberdeen, Washington
- Bufano Sculpture Garden at Johns Hopkins University in Baltimore, Maryland
- Red Owl: Temple University in Philadelphia, Pennsylvania.
