= Tilden Park Merry-Go-Round =

Coordinates: 37°54′02″N 122°15′22″W

- Hershell-Spillman Merry-Go-Round
- U.S. National Register of Historic Places
- Merry-Go-Round Building
- Location: Tilden Regional Park
- Nearest city: Berkeley, California
- Architect: Hershell-Spillman Co.
- NRHP reference No.: 76000480
- Added to NRHP: September 29, 1976

The Tilden Park Merry-Go-Round is a menagerie carousel located in Tilden Regional Park near Berkeley and Oakland, in unincorporated Contra Costa County. It was built by the Herschell-Spillman Company of Tonawanda, New York in 1911, and it is one of the few antique carousels left in the United States. Before arriving at Tilden in 1948, the carousel had seen service at amusement parks in San Bernardino, Ocean Beach, and Los Angeles. It is listed on the National Register of Historic Places.

The Merry-Go-Round carousel is owned by the East Bay Regional Park District.

== History ==
Selected locations in and near Tilden Regional Park
- Points of interest
- Nearby parks and museums
1 Tilden Little Farm
2 Tilden Park Merry-Go-Round
3 Inspiration Point
4 Lake Anza
5 Brazilian Room
6 Regional Parks Botanic Garden
7 Tilden Park Golf Course
8 Redwood Valley Railway
9 Blake Garden
10 Indian Rock Park
11 Berkeley Rose Garden
12 Lawrence Hall of Science
13 San Pablo Reservoir

The Tilden Park Merry-Go-Round originally operated from 1912 to 1916 at a trolley park at Urbita Springs, a lake that no longer exists in San Bernardino. The ride operated for a short time in San Diego County before being placed in storage. From 1935 to 1937 it operated at Griffith Park in Los Angeles before being replaced with the current Griffith Park Merry-Go-Round. In 1947, East Bay Regional Park District General Manager Richard Walpole visited Griffith Park and was impressed with their revenue producing concessions, including the Merry-Go-Round. The Merry-Go-Round operators in Griffith Park, the Davis family, were convinced by Walpole to move the ride that had been in storage and open it in Tilden Park. Ross Davis and his son John opened the Merry-Go-Round on May 29, 1948, at its current location.

In 1950, the Merry-Go-Round was expanded from a three-row machine to its current configuration as a four-row machine. The inside row of horses are all cast aluminum figures in contrast to the hand-carved poplar figures on the rest of the Merry-Go-Round. At the time of the reconfiguration, the original rounding boards were replaced with the white rounding boards seen today. The vignette paintings on the rounding boards were also painted in 1950.

While major mechanical overhauls have taken place over the years, including in 2008, much of the original machine remains intact. The machine is still operated using a trolley car throttle and a manual handbrake system. The original 7-1/2 horsepower Westinghouse electric motor still drives the Merry-Go-Round.

== Current Operations ==
The Merry-Go-Round is generally open weekends year-round and weekdays from Memorial Day to Labor Day along with Spring Break. Hours are normally 11am-5pm except summer weekends when the ride closes at 6pm. Additionally, the Merry-Go-Round is open for a night time Christmas event from Thanksgiving to Christmas.

A food concession stand operates adjacent to the Merry-Go-Round selling drinks, lunch items, ice cream, cotton candy, and popcorn among other items.

The Merry-Go-Round is accessible on weekends by AC Transit bus line 67, Lake Anza/Merry-Go-Round stop.

== Restoration ==
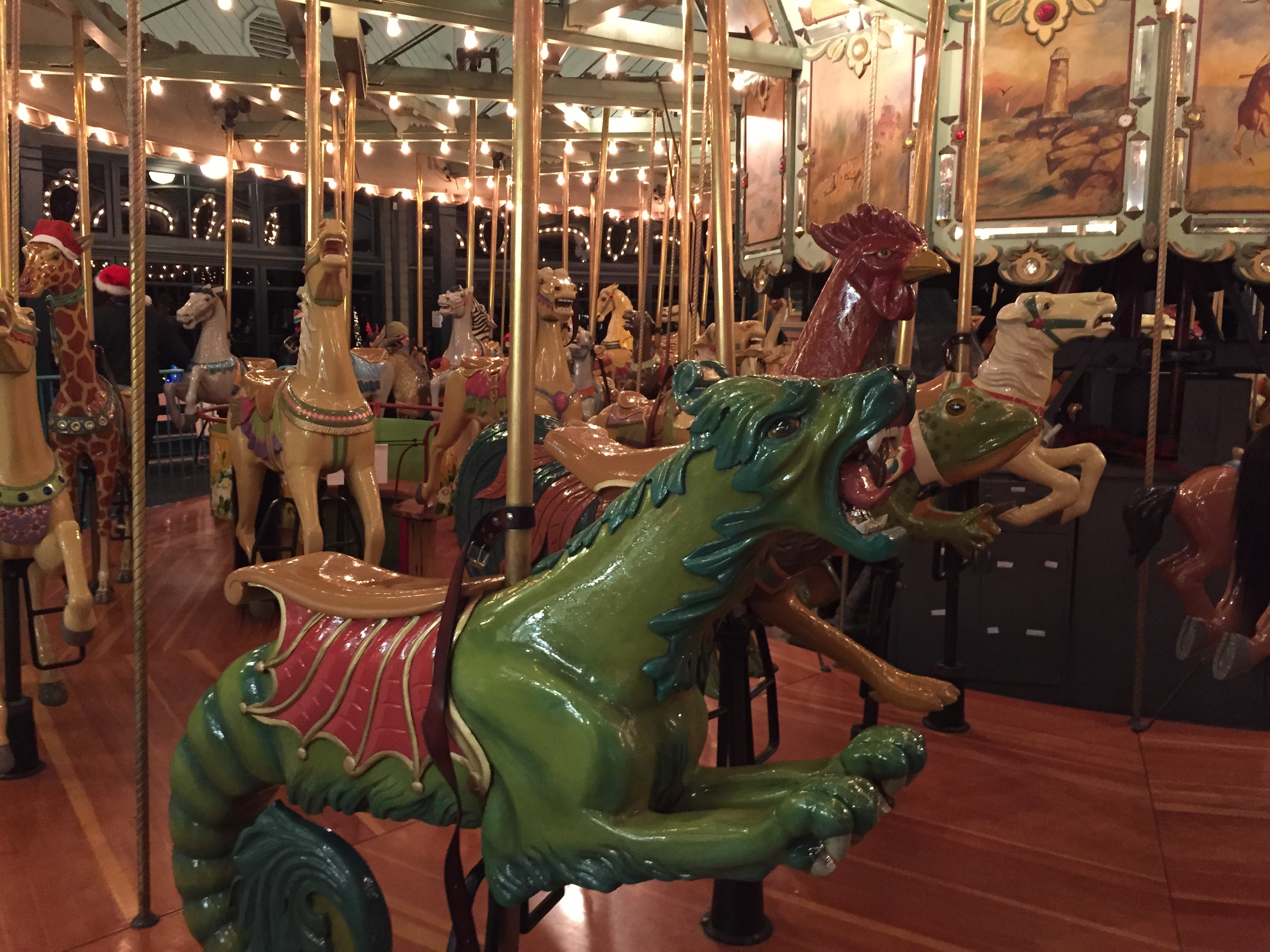
The Tilden Park Merry-Go-Round sea monster after being repainted in November 2015.

Upon acquiring the Merry-Go-Round in the 1970s, the East Bay Regional Park District hired a team of artists to restore the animals, spinning tub, and chariots. The ride was painted in the color palette that exists today, taking cues from the surrounding parklands.

In 2008, the Merry-Go-Round was closed for an extensive mechanical overhaul that included the remodeling of the building to add weather proof doors and windows. The aging wooden platform deck was replaced with a custom milled, vertical grain platform deck that is treated with a clear protective coat. A full overhaul of the North Tonawanda Band Organ at the center of the Merry-Go-Round was performed, however the band organ was not yet operating as of March 2016. The full project cost $700,000.

In November 2015, all Merry-Go-Round animals, spinning tub, and chariots were repainted in the 1970s color palette, the project included artists from the 1970s restoration. The 2015 project was a collaboration of Hawk's Eye Studio, Sycamore Concessions, and the East Bay Regional Park District.

== Filmography ==
Before being relocated to Tilden Park, the carousel was in So Ends Our Night (1941).

The Merry-Go-Round was used as a film location for Remember Me (2016) featuring Rita Moreno and Steve Goldbloom.

== See also ==
- Amusement rides on the National Register of Historic Places
- National Register of Historic Places listings in Contra Costa County, California

Merry-Go-Round
