= Lake Anza =

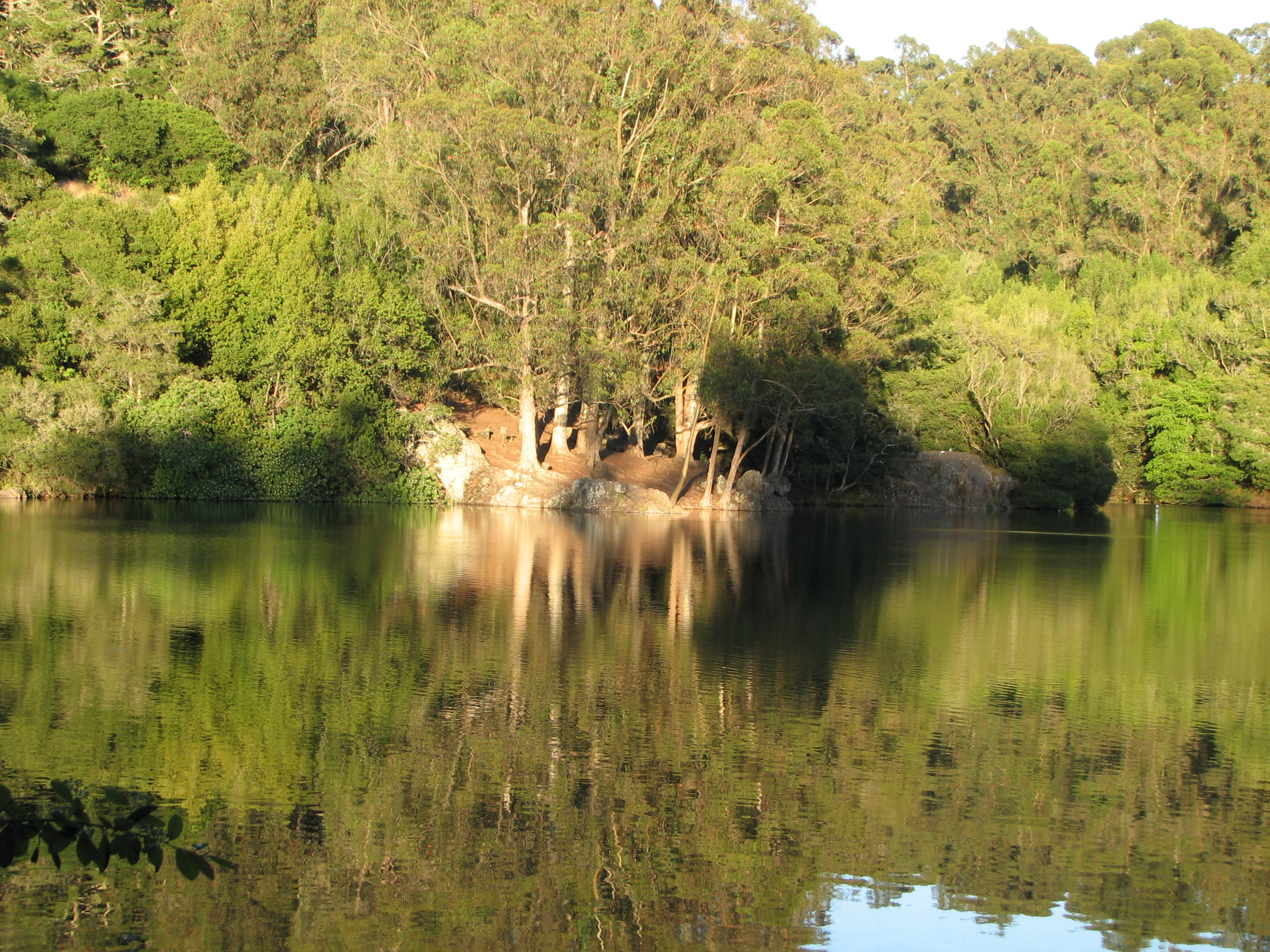

- Location within California Location within the United States
- Location: Contra Costa County, California
- Coordinates: 37°53′46″N 122°15′01″W
- Type: reservoir
- Primary inflows: Wildcat Creek
- Primary outflows: Wildcat Creek
- Catchment area: 1.56 sq mi (4.0 km^{2})
- Basin countries: United States
- Surface area: 10 acres (4.0 ha)
- Surface elevation: 794 ft (242 m)

Lake Anza is a recreational swimming reservoir, located within the Tilden Regional Park, in the Berkeley Hills above Berkeley, California.

== History ==
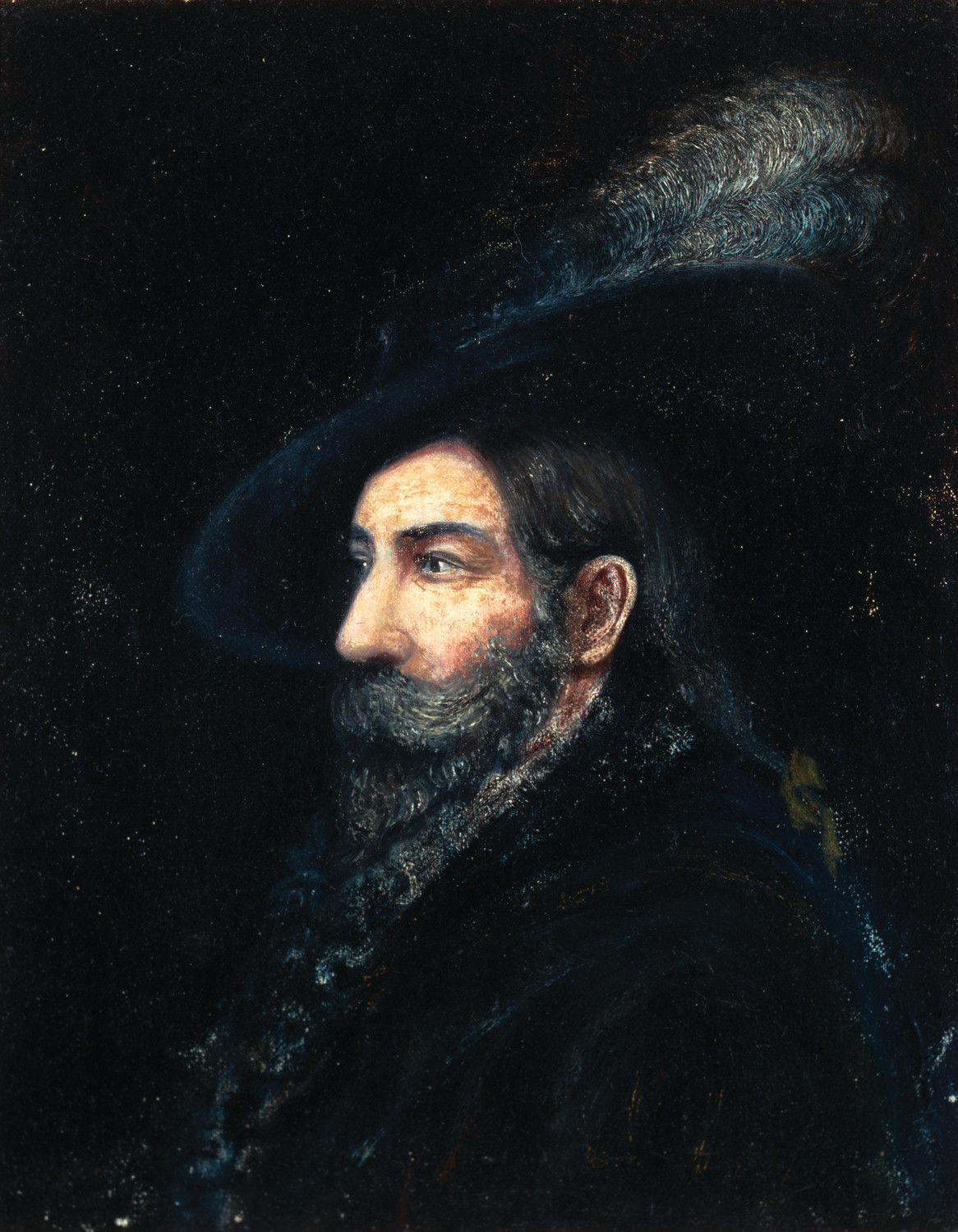
Juan Bautista de Anza, namesake of the lake.

The lake was created by the construction of the C L Tilden Park Dam in 1938. It was named by the East Bay Regional Park Board in honor of Spanish explorer Juan Bautista de Anza.

Lake Anza was constructed in 1938 with financing by the Public Works Administration (PWA) as a recreational lake while also providing water to the Tilden Park golf course. While the golf course no longer uses Lake Anza water, remnants of the water system remain. The beach and stone bath house were constructed by the Works Progress Administration (WPA). The original WPA stone bath house burned down in the 1960s and was replaced with the current facility.

== Facilities ==
Selected locations in and near Tilden Regional Park
- Points of interest
- Nearby parks and museums
1 Tilden Little Farm
2 Tilden Park Merry-Go-Round
3 Inspiration Point
4 Lake Anza
5 Brazilian Room
6 Regional Parks Botanic Garden
7 Tilden Park Golf Course
8 Redwood Valley Railway
9 Blake Garden
10 Indian Rock Park
11 Berkeley Rose Garden
12 Lawrence Hall of Science
13 San Pablo Reservoir

The lake area includes amenities such as changing rooms, bathrooms (toilets), and large parking areas. There are areas around the lake reserved for waterfowl, and other areas for dogs.

The lake is open for swimming from May to September. During this time there is an entry fee required, lifeguards are on duty, and a snack bar is open. The swimming area is restricted to the water alongside a sandy and grassy beach area which is about 70 yards (64 m) long. There is an adult swim area with a length of 44 yards (40 m).

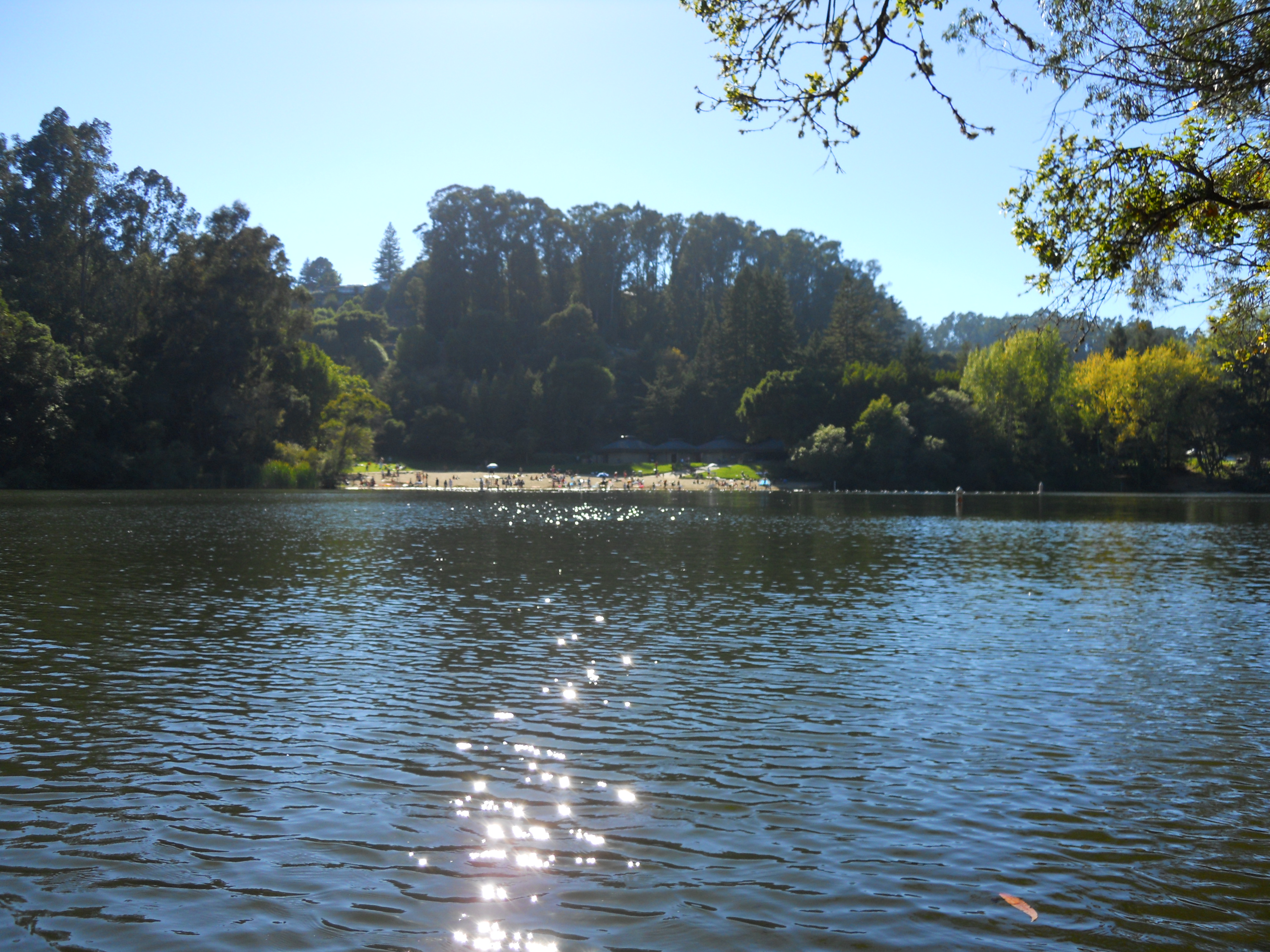
Beach at Lake Anza

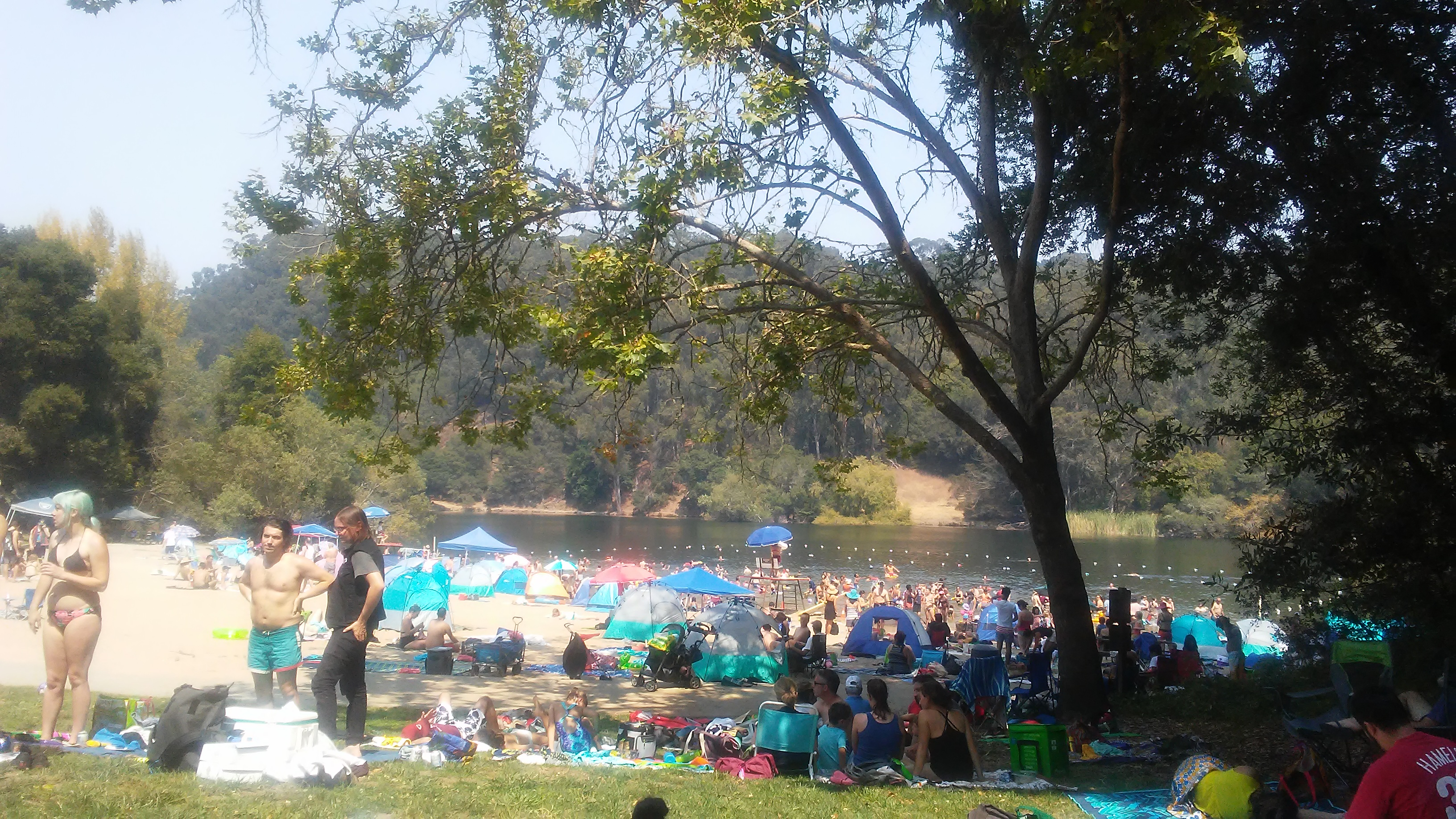
Beach at Lake Anza

== See also ==
- Lake Temescal
- List of lakes in California
- List of lakes in the San Francisco Bay Area
- List of dams and reservoirs in California
