= Indian Rock Park =

Park and rock formation in Berkeley, California, USA

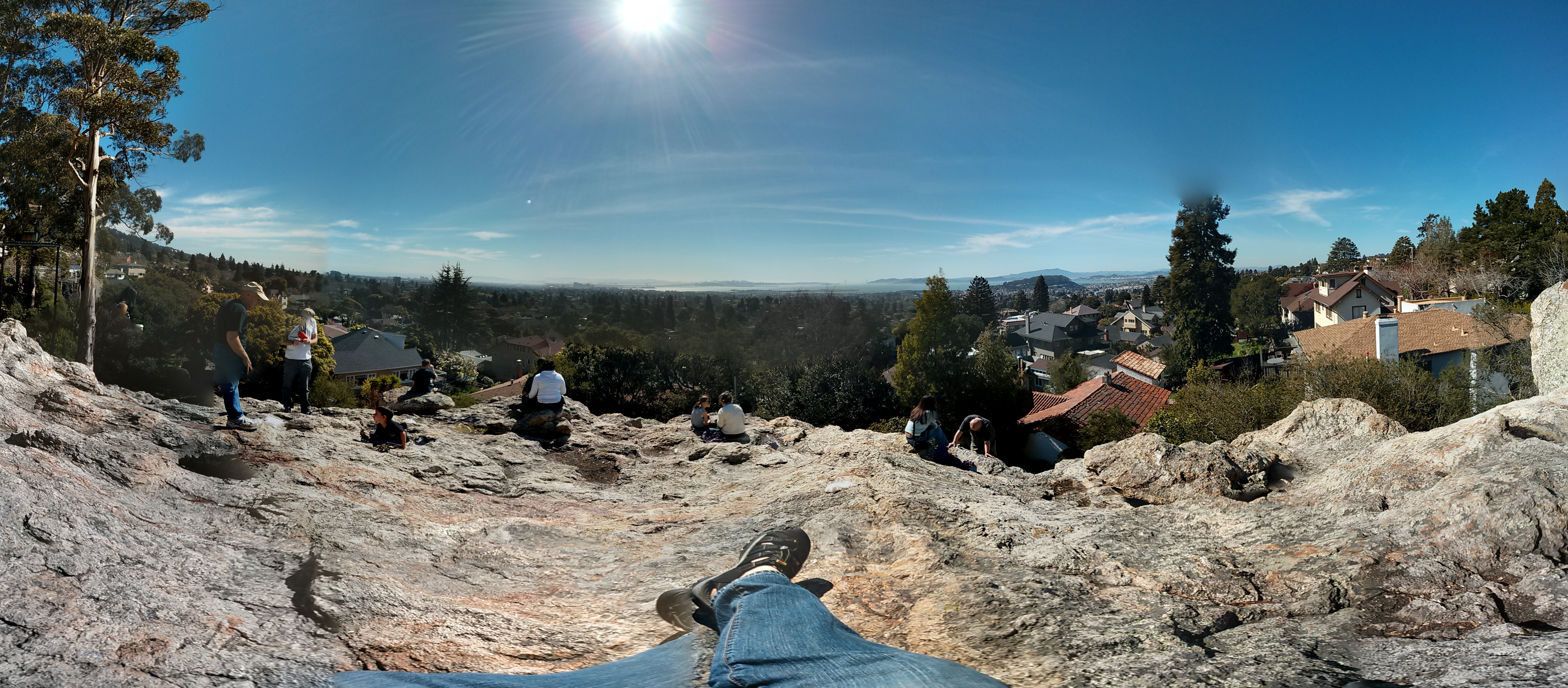
- The view from Indian Rock

- Location within California
- Type: Public
- Location: 950 Indian Rock Avenue Berkeley, California, United States
- Nearest city: Berkeley, California
- Coordinates: 37°53′32″N 122°16′23″W
- Area: 1.18 acres (0.48 ha)
- Created: 1917
- Status: Open year round

Indian Rock Park is a 1.18-acre (4,800 m^{2}) public park in the city of Berkeley, California, on the slope of the Berkeley Hills. Located in the city's Northbrae neighborhood, it is about two blocks north of the Arlington/Marin Circle, and straddles Indian Rock Avenue. The central feature of the park is a large rock outcropping on the west side of Indian Rock Ave. The larger portion of the park, on the opposite side of the street, has several much smaller rock outcroppings, grass fields, and a small barbecue and picnic area. The rock is composed of Northbrae rhyolite.

== History ==
Selected locations in and near Tilden Regional Park
- Points of interest
- Nearby parks and museums
1 Tilden Little Farm
2 Tilden Park Merry-Go-Round
3 Inspiration Point
4 Lake Anza
5 Brazilian Room
6 Regional Parks Botanic Garden
7 Tilden Park Golf Course
8 Redwood Valley Railway
9 Blake Garden
10 Indian Rock Park
11 Berkeley Rose Garden
12 Lawrence Hall of Science
13 San Pablo Reservoir

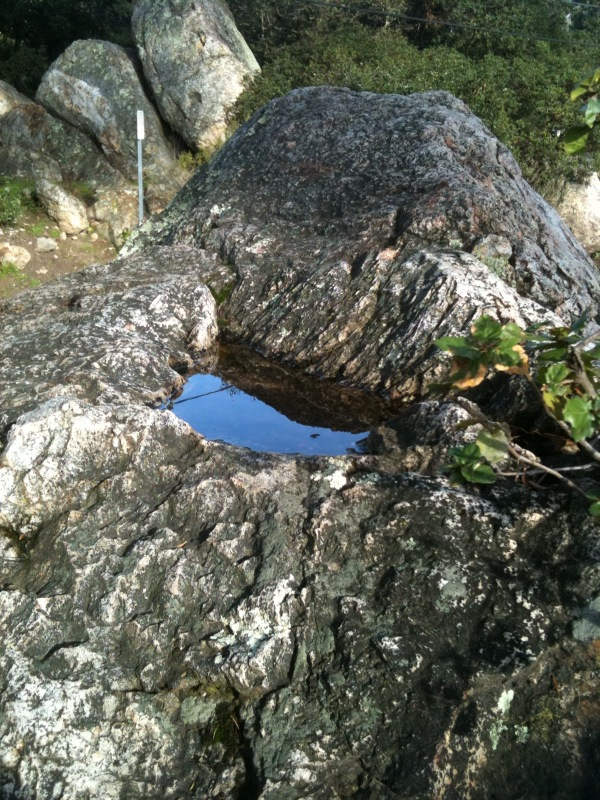
Acorn grinding pit at Indian Rock

Volcanic in origin, Indian Rock is one of the rhyolite rock formations found across the Bay Area. The formation of such outcrops are estimated to have occurred between nine and eleven million years ago, effectively dating the structures. These rock formations are resulting from two different phenomena. They stem from either molten material from subduction (found in regions like Pinnacles national park), or volcanic activity from the slip-strike nature of the transform faults in the East Bay. Evidence for the Indian Rock rhyolite being from slip-strike activity comes from the site being in the path of the Mendocino Triple Junction as it migrated northward. Similar sites can be found nearby, including only one block east of Indian Rock Avenue, where the 0.39-acre (1,600 m^{2}) Mortar Rock Park is found.

Many remains of acorn-grinding pits carved into solid rock can be found in all these outcroppings, especially the aptly named Mortar Rock. These pits were made by the local indigenous people, the Huichin band of the Ohlones. The park is very historically significant to the Ohlone people, as they consider their history and personal connection to the rocks to be sacred. For example, the nearby Mortar Rock Park marks the place where Ohlone people used the bedrock mortars as grinding stones for food or medicine, wearing deep depressions into the rock. The stones also were important community gathering and social sites for the Ohlone people, where ceremonies could be held and stories could be shared. To this day it remains a place of cultural significance that people protect and recognize for its history.

The land for Indian Rock Park was donated along with other nearby parcels in 1917 to the City of Berkeley for the purpose of creating a park during the Mason McDuffie development of the Northbrae area. The donor, Duncan McDuffie, was an environmentalist, real estate mogul, Sierra Club president and mountaineer. During the Great Depression, a set of stairs was added into the park as one of the “New Deal” projects. Indian Rock has long been used as a practice site for serious rock climbing, particularly bouldering. Members of the Sierra Club began climbing there regularly on weekends at least as early as the 1930s. Richard M. Leonard, the "father of modern rock climbing", and noted environmentalist David Brower, founder of Friends of the Earth, learned rock climbing and developed their mountaineering techniques at Indian Rock. Brower used this special knowledge to prepare training manuals during World War II, which proved critical in enabling the 86th Regiment of the U.S. Army to surprise the Germans at Riva Ridge in the North Apennines in Italy, the major action disrupting German lines in southern Europe.

== Description ==
The top of the main outcropping, Indian Rock, has views that encompass sights from downtown Oakland and the University of California, Berkeley campus to the south; central Berkeley, San Francisco Bay, and San Francisco to the west; and Marin County and Richmond, California to the northwest and north. All three of the bay's largest bridges can be seen from the rock.

Indian Rock Path, a public walkway, connects the park to the intersection of Solano Avenue and The Alameda. The main part of Indian Rock itself has two sets of steps leading to its summit that were carved into the rock during the Depression years. All seven of the original Eucalyptus trees were removed from Indian Rock Park from January 2023 and April 2024 in an effort to rid the area of the invasive species. The city has since then been planting native trees such as California Buckeye, Western Redbud, California flannelbush trees. Even after recent renovations, several signs of the previous Ohlone occupants remain embedded in the park, including the deeply-seated mortar carvings that served the lifestyle of these individuals.

Indian Rock Park has been featured in the New York Times on at least two occasions, once each in 2010 and 2018.
