= Redwood Valley Railway =

Miniature railway in Tilden Regional Park, California, US

Coordinates: 37°52′50″N 122°13′23″W

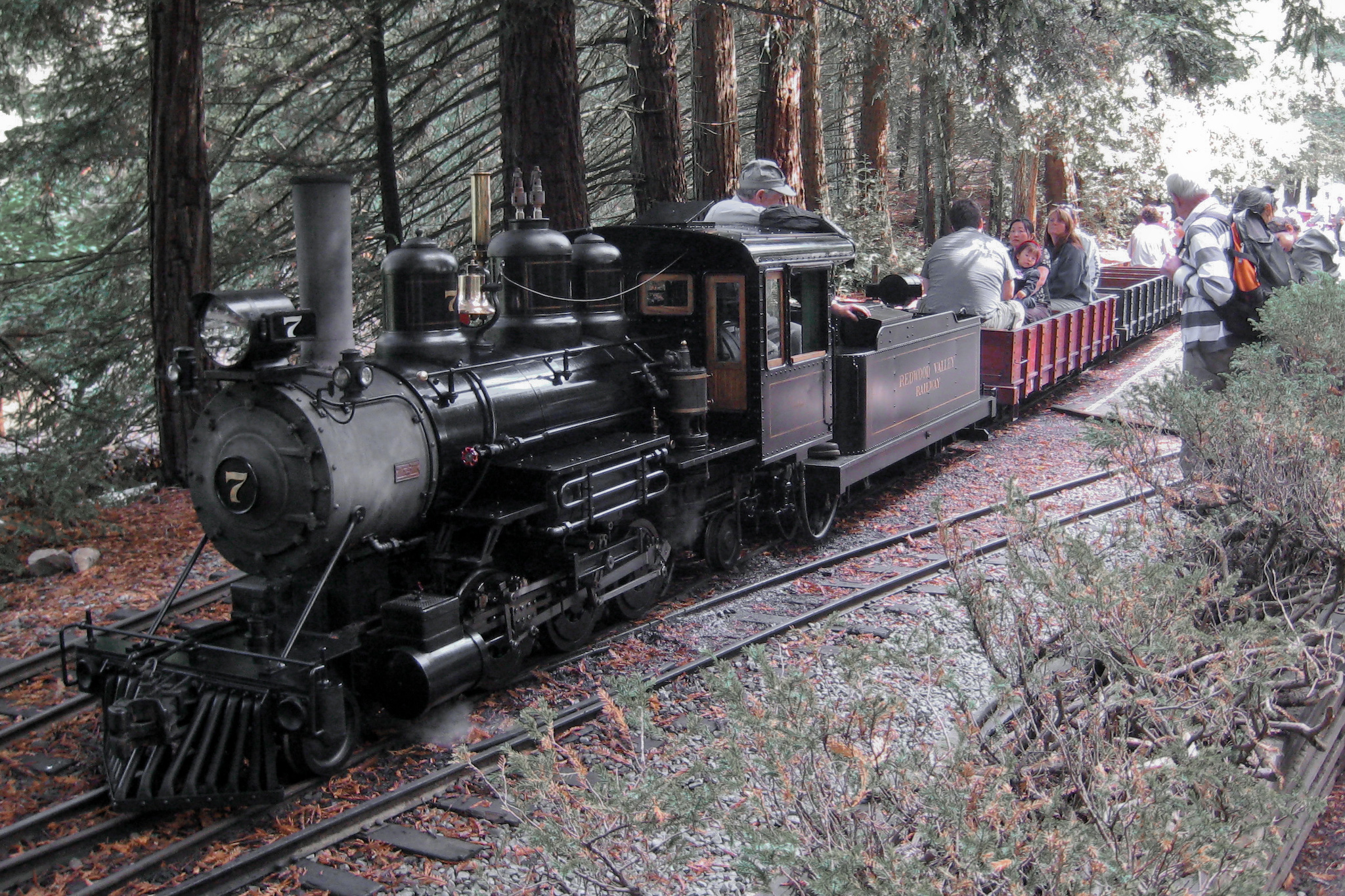
- Locomotive No. 7 "Oak" and passengers

Overview
- Website: Tilden Park Steam Train on Facebook

Technical
- Line length: 1.2 mi (1.9 km)
- Track gauge: 15 in (381 mm)
- Highest elevation: 497 m (1,631 ft)

The Redwood Valley Railway is a 15 in (381 mm) gauge miniature railway at Tilden Regional Park near Berkeley, California, United States.

== History ==
Selected locations in and near Tilden Regional Park
- Points of interest
- Nearby parks and museums
1 Tilden Little Farm
2 Tilden Park Merry-Go-Round
3 Inspiration Point
4 Lake Anza
5 Brazilian Room
6 Regional Parks Botanic Garden
7 Tilden Park Golf Course
8 Redwood Valley Railway
9 Blake Garden
10 Indian Rock Park
11 Berkeley Rose Garden
12 Lawrence Hall of Science
13 San Pablo Reservoir

It was established in 1952 by Erich Thomsen as the Tilden South Gate and Pacific Railway, on a 12 in (305 mm) gauge, and has since expanded to 1 1/4 miles (2 km) of track and carries over 160,000 passengers yearly. Thomsen worked in the engineering department for the Western Pacific Railroad and received at least three patents for his work. The railway occupies land near the base of Vollmer Peak that was previously used as an anti-aircraft gun emplacement.

800 now-mature redwood trees were planted when the railroad was initially laid out. In 1968, the railroad was re-gauged to 15 in (381 mm), or ~1:3.8 scale. The new 15" gauge equipment allowed two adults to ride side by side and is representative of American narrow gauge railroads. Two of Redwood Valley's locomotives have made trips to England, run on several English 15 in gauge railways, including the Ravenglass and Eskdale. After Thomsen died in 1995, his daughter Ellen Thomsen assumed operations of the Redwood Valley Railway, which included the planting of 900 redwood trees on the property by 2019.

The railway's 10-year lease with the East Bay Regional Park District expired in 2019, and Thomsen and the district have not been able to agree on terms for a long-term lease. The railway does not receive any financial contribution from the district, and operations, maintenance, landscaping, and fire hazard abatement are paid for with private funds. She told SFGate in October 2025 that the lease dispute is preventing the railway from getting county permits to make capital improvements to the site, and said that "with no legal protection, we may have to pick up everything and leave". A statement by the district called the Redwood Valley Railway "a cherished and valued resource".

== Operations ==
Rides last approximately 12-15 minutes along the 1.25 mile track. As of October 2024, a ticket for adults and children over 2 are $4, or $16 for five rides. Dogs are allowed on the train but are required to be on a leash at all times.

=== Schedule ===
The Redwood Valley Railway (RVRy) operates Saturday and Sunday from 11am to 6pm year-round (11am to sundown in winter - weather permitting).

During the summer (from mid June to Labor Day) the railway operates 7 days a week from 11am to 5pm weekdays and 11am to 6pm weekends.

=== Special events ===
The first full weekend in June is the Anniversary Meet, which is open to the public from 11am to 6pm. Most of the RVRy's locomotives are under steam, and often visiting locomotives and rolling stock appear for the occasion.

RVRy celebrates "Winterfest" during the first and second weekends of December, where the railway stays open until 7pm and "Father Solstice", with his green suit and puffy white beard, rides along.

== Rolling stock ==
=== Locomotives ===
The railroad has four 15-inch scale steam locomotives, designed by Erich Thomsen and built on location by the railroad's Redwood Valley Shops. Each is designed for service on the RVRy and while they are not based on any full-size prototypes, they share many details with engines built by the Baldwin Locomotive Works built between 1875 and 1910. They hold about 150 gallons of water and make 10 trips. In addition, RVRy owns a single diesel-hydraulic locomotive, number 2, which only is used for work trains.

Number/name	Class	Wheel arrangement	Builder	Year	Notes	Photograph
2 Juniper		0-4-0	Erich Thomsen	1930s	Diesel-hydraulic locomotive, used mainly for non-revenue operations. Formerly used vintage Hercules engine. Rebuilt in 2008.	
4 Laurel	Columbia	2-4-2	Erich Thomsen's basement workshop	1965	In revenue service. Received new boiler and tender tank.	
5 Fern	American	4-4-0	Redwood Valley Shops	1986	In revenue service. Rebuilt in 2014.	
7 Oak	Prairie	2-6-2	Redwood Valley Shops	2005	In revenue service starting April 2006; built c.1978–2006 by Ray Pimlott. Partially rebuilt October–December 2017. Running gear rebuilt 2025.	
11; Sequoia	Ten-Wheeler	4-6-0	Redwood Valley Shops	1976	In revenue service starting September 1978. Rebuilt early 2018.	
18 Anne		0-4-0	Hillcrest Shops	2001	Built for Chris Allen's private railroad. Lettered for West Side Flume & Lumber Co. (WSF&LCo.) Donated 2022. Used for special events.	
02		Rail Truck	West Side Locomotive Works	1995	Built by Ken Kukuk while awaiting GSP&P 13's boiler. Same as H&W 03 & HH&YV 08. Lettered for GSP&P.	

=== Cars and other stock ===
The Redwood Valley Railway maintains 13 wooden gondolas, built similar to those found on 36" narrow-gauge lines in the American West. The gondolas, equipped with seating for up to eight adults, are the mainstay passenger rolling stock for this operation. The RVRy also owns three stock cars which have been specifically built to carry passengers as well. These are often favorites with small children, although a full-sized adult can comfortably fit inside.

Other equipment includes a boxcar, a pair of extra convertible gondolas (from flatcars), which can either haul passengers or satisfy maintenance-of-way needs.

The RVRy owns 13 four-wheel maintenance-of-way cars known as "jimmies", which have specialized uses such as welding, tie replacement, or carrying ballast. Two of which came with WSF&LCo. 18, built for Chris Allen by the Hillcrest and Wahtoke in 2001.

The RVRy's first flatcar was built as a high school shop project by one of the crew in the 1970s. Three more have followed since then.

Unique among the roster of cars is a coal gondola, once used to carry extra coal for number 4. Coal was used up until the mid-1970s when number 4 was converted to fuel oil. The coal gondola, with its higher sides, is infrequently used. It currently carries a few dozen metal folding chairs for the annual meet.

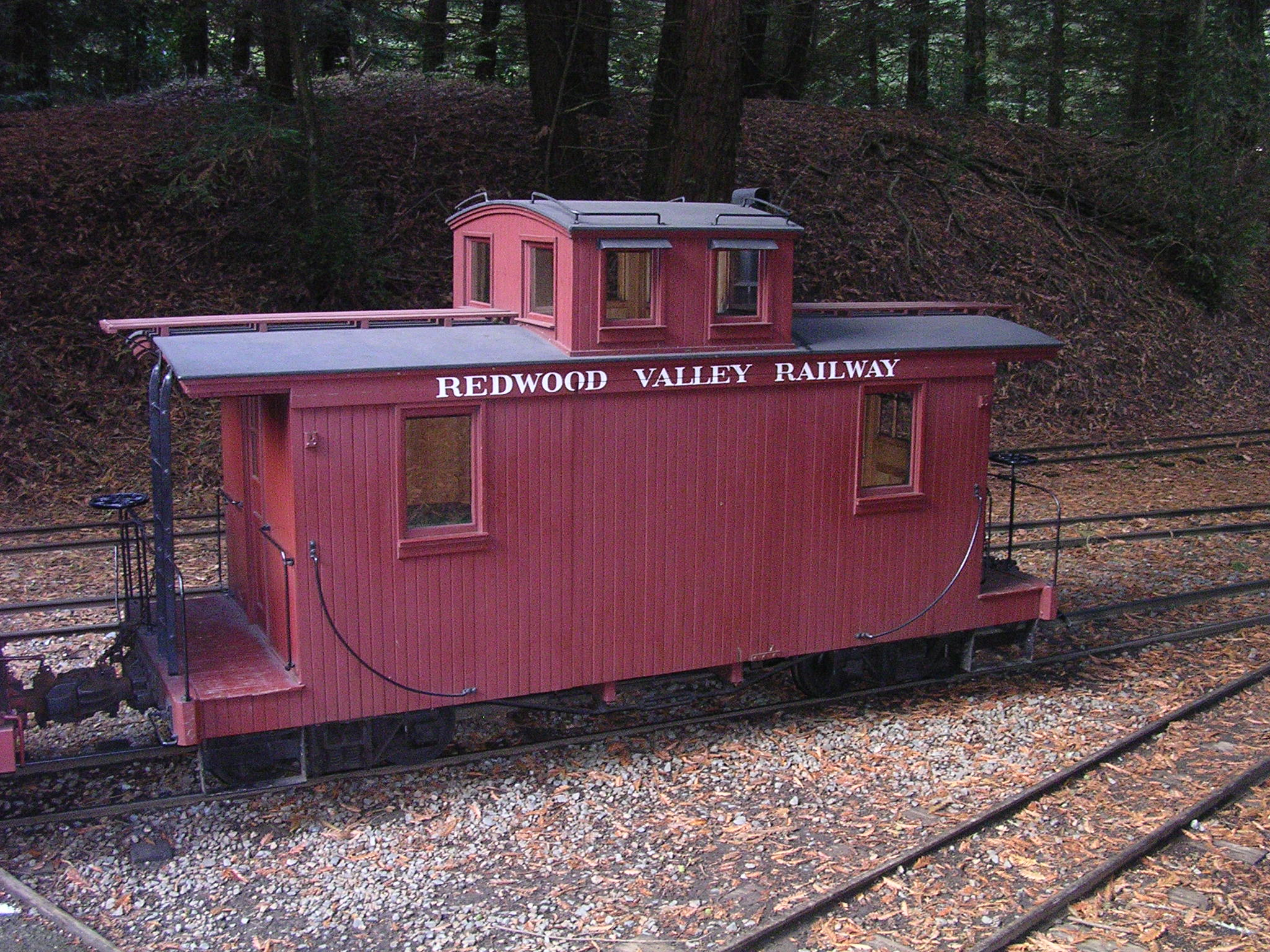
RVRy caboose

The caboose attracts many visitors and is based on a D&RGW 36" gauge prototype. This "short" center cupola caboose has held the place of the end of most revenue trains for over 30 years. While there is a hatch in the back of the caboose to enter, it is not recommended for customers to use for safety reasons.

=== Future projects ===
Parts for a 2-4-4 Forney and a 2-6-0 exist, but currently remain unassembled. Plans for a second caboose and a lavish, scale (down to the furniture, wallpaper, and bar with tiny glasses) business car are in the works.

As of late-2024, the boiler and frame for number 13, the aforementioned 2-6-0 have been manufactured and are on-site. Not to be confused with a visiting GSP&P 13 from the Glenwood, Southpark and Pacific.

=== Former ===
Number 1 Cricket, the 12 in (305 mm)-gauge 4-4-0 steam locomotive that was first used when service started in 1952, along with a few 12" gauge cars were sold to the Folsom Valley Ry. in Folsom, California

=== Storage ===
The RVRy has 3 barns to store cars when not in use. They also have a roundhouse, which has a viewing window to see their other steam engines. There is also a tunnel, which was going to be part of an expansion line, until it collapsed mid-way. The tunnel is now used to hold four cars.
