= San Pablo Ridge =

Coordinates: 37.9352020°N 122.2705246°W

San Pablo Ridge is a small mountain range in western Contra Costa County from Pinole to Orinda between Wildcat Canyon and San Pablo Canyon. The western flank is part of the Wildcat Creek watershed and the eastern flank is part of the San Pablo Creek watershed. To the west are the Berkeley Hills, and to the east, the Sobrante Ridge. The highest point on the San Pablo Ridge is Vollmer Peak (elevation 1,905 feet/581m), formerly called "Bald Peak", located near the point where it meets the Berkeley Hills at the head of Wildcat Canyon.

San Pablo Ridge is largely undeveloped, forming part of county lands and open space, with a few privately held ranches remaining.
