= San Pablo Creek =

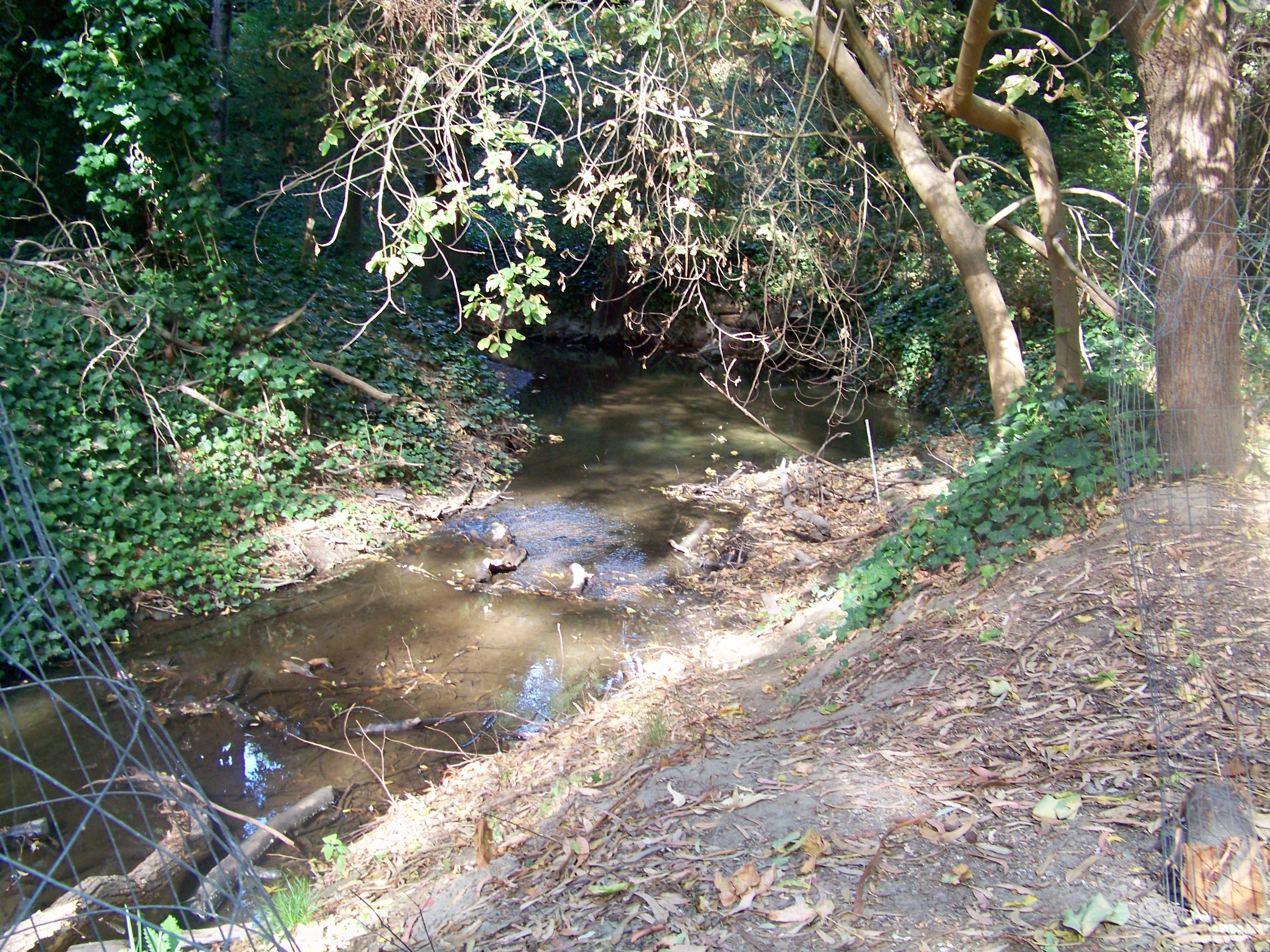
- San Pablo Creek just behind the El Sobrante Library

- Location of the mouth of San Pablo Creek in California
- Native name: Spanish: Arroyo de San Pablo

Location
- Country: United States
- State: California
- Region: Contra Costa County

Physical characteristics
- Source: Mulholland Hill
  - location: Orinda, California
  - coordinates: 37°52′1″N 122°8′58″W
  - elevation: 750 ft (230 m)
- Mouth: San Pablo Bay
  - location: west of San Pablo, California
  - coordinates: 37°58′35″N 122°23′0″W
  - elevation: 0 ft (0 m)
- Basin size: 41 sq mi (110 km^{2})

San Pablo Creek is an 18.7-mile-long (30.1 km) creek in Contra Costa County, California, United States, which drains the canyon or valley between the San Pablo Ridge and the Sobrante Ridge, parts of the Pacific Coast Ranges east of San Francisco Bay.

The creek runs from the southeast to the northwest, originating near Orinda and flowing into San Pablo Bay. It drains one of the largest watersheds in the East Bay, comprising some 41 square miles (110 km^{2}). The creek has 34 named tributaries. The creek was dammed in 1919, forming the San Pablo Reservoir. Briones Reservoir, constructed in 1964, dams the Bear Creek tributary. San Pablo Reservoir essentially splits the creek in two, with about half of the creek and its related feeder creeks on either side of the artificial lake; for much of its course, it runs parallel to Wildcat Creek, which drains from Wildcat Canyon, the next valley to the west. The East Bay Municipal Utility District (EBMUD) gets less than 10% of its water from the creek.

== Overview ==
The tributaries are as follows: Appian Creek, Baden Creek, Barn Creek, Bear Creek, Big Oak Creek, Briones Reservoir, Cascade Creek, Castro Creek, Coal Mine Creek, Clark Creek, Dutra Creek, El Toyonal Creek, Greenridge Creek, Inspiration Creek, Kennedy Creek, La Colina Creek, Lauterwasser Creek, Leastrot Creek, Lila Creek, Miner Creek, Newell Creek, Oak Creek, Oursan Creek, Overhill Creek, Rose Creek, Russel Creek, San Pablo Reservoir, Sather Creek, Schoolhouse Creek, Siesta Valley Creek, Tarry Creek, Tin House Creek, Wagner Creek, Wilkie Creek and Wire Ranch Creek.

The creek is helped by many community organizations. The city of San Pablo has organized cleanups, as has the Friends of Orinda Creeks. The San Pablo Watershed Neighbors Education and Resources Society (SPAWNERS) goes further than just garbage and weed cleanups and includes restoration efforts and watershed studies. SPAWNERS has built and maintained a creek bank restoration site and California native plant demonstration gardens at the El Sobrante Library adjacent to downtown El Sobrante since 2000. SPAWNERS also maintains a creek re-vegetation site at the El Sobrante Boys and Girls Club as well as an outdoor classroom project along Wilkie Creek (a tributary of San Pablo) behind De Anza High School. The damming of the creek has limited threatened steelhead spawning sites but has allowed it to continue to survive there. Native Ohlone shell mounds were once found along the creek, especially near San Pablo Bay.

San Pablo Creek's delta, located within the city limits of Richmond, is known as San Pablo Creek Marsh, and its 300 acres (1.2 km^{2}) are filled with an abundance of wildlife, including endangered species such as the California clapper rail, the salt marsh harvest mouse, the threatened black rail, the salt marsh wandering shrew, and the San Pablo vole. Other animals present are the shy salt marsh harvest sparrows which live in the sloughs, while salt marsh yellow throats live among the willows that grow along the transition between fresh creek water and salty bay water.

== History ==
The San Pablo Canyon through which the creek flows was in the early 19th century an open grazing area shared by adjoining Mexican ranch owners. In the latter years of the 19th century, a narrow gauge railroad, the California and Nevada, ran down the canyon as far as Orinda. The company intended to construct their line past Orinda all the way to the mining districts of Nevada, but the railroad was plagued by washouts in the canyon every winter, and was relegated to serving weekend picnickers traveling from the cities on San Francisco Bay. The line through the canyon was abandoned upon the acquisition of the California and Nevada by the Santa Fe Railroad.

== See also ==
- List of watercourses in the San Francisco Bay Area
