= Sobrante Ridge Regional Park =

Park in California, United States

Coordinates: 37.9675°N 122.2644°W

Sobrante Ridge Regional Park, or simply Sobrante Ridge, is a regional park of the East Bay Regional Parks District in Richmond, California. It covers 277 acres (1.1 km^{2}) and protects the extremely endangered Alameda manzanita, a native plant of the area. The park has 2 1/2 miles (4.0 km) of trails. The endangered manzanita grow on 9 acres (0.036 km^{2}).
