= San Pablo Reservoir =

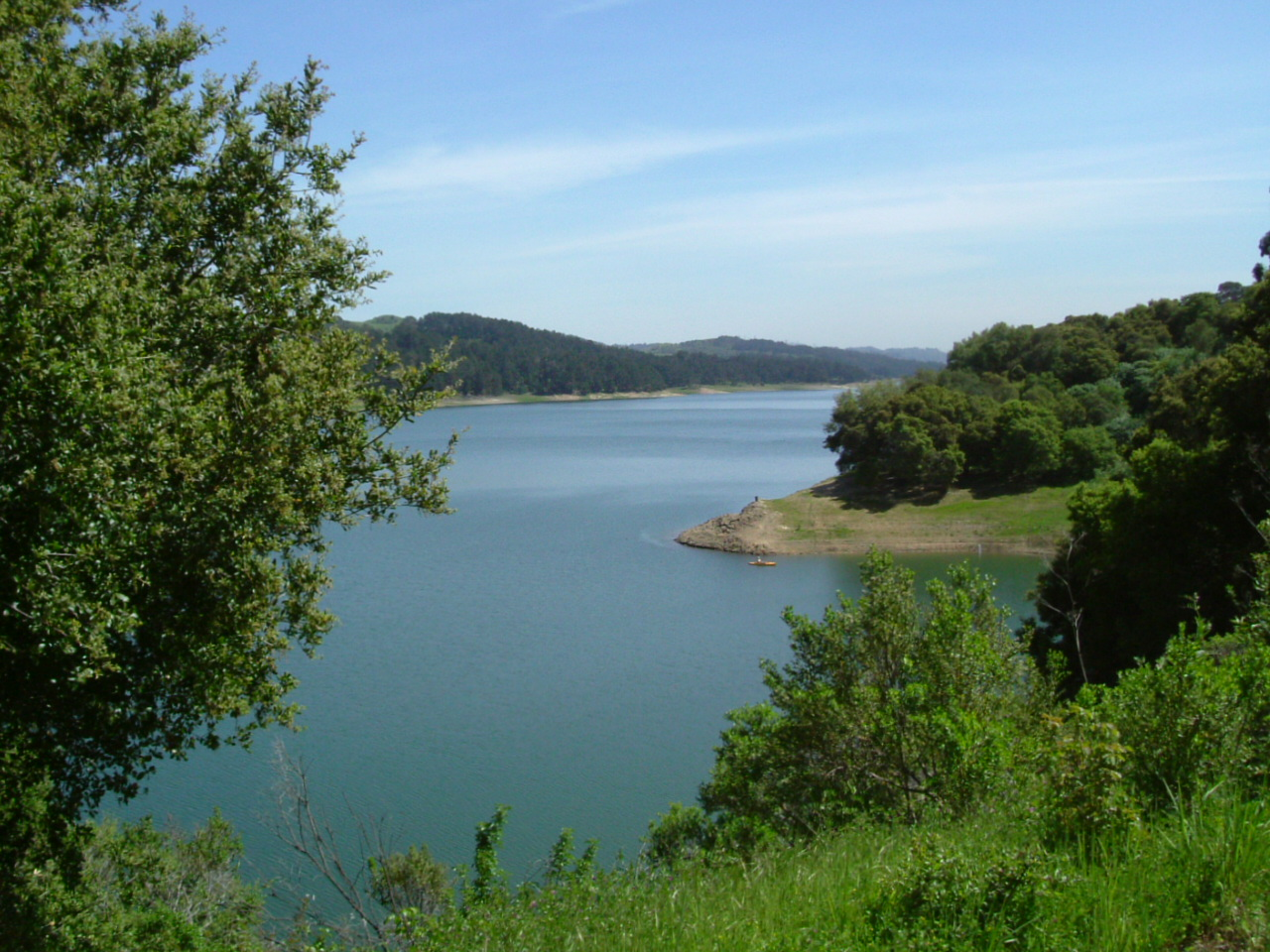

- Location within California Location within the United States
- Location: Contra Costa County, California, United States
- Coordinates: 37°56′36″N 122°15′42″W
- Type: Reservoir
- Primary inflows: San Pablo Creek
- Primary outflows: San Pablo Creek
- Catchment area: 23.37 sq mi (60.5 km^{2})
- Basin countries: United States
- Surface elevation: 305 ft (93 m)

The San Pablo Reservoir is an open cut terminal water storage reservoir owned and operated by the East Bay Municipal Utility District (EBMUD). It is located in the valley of San Pablo Creek, north of Orinda, California, United States, and south of El Sobrante and Richmond, east of the Berkeley Hills between San Pablo Ridge and Sobrante Ridge.

== San Pablo Dam ==
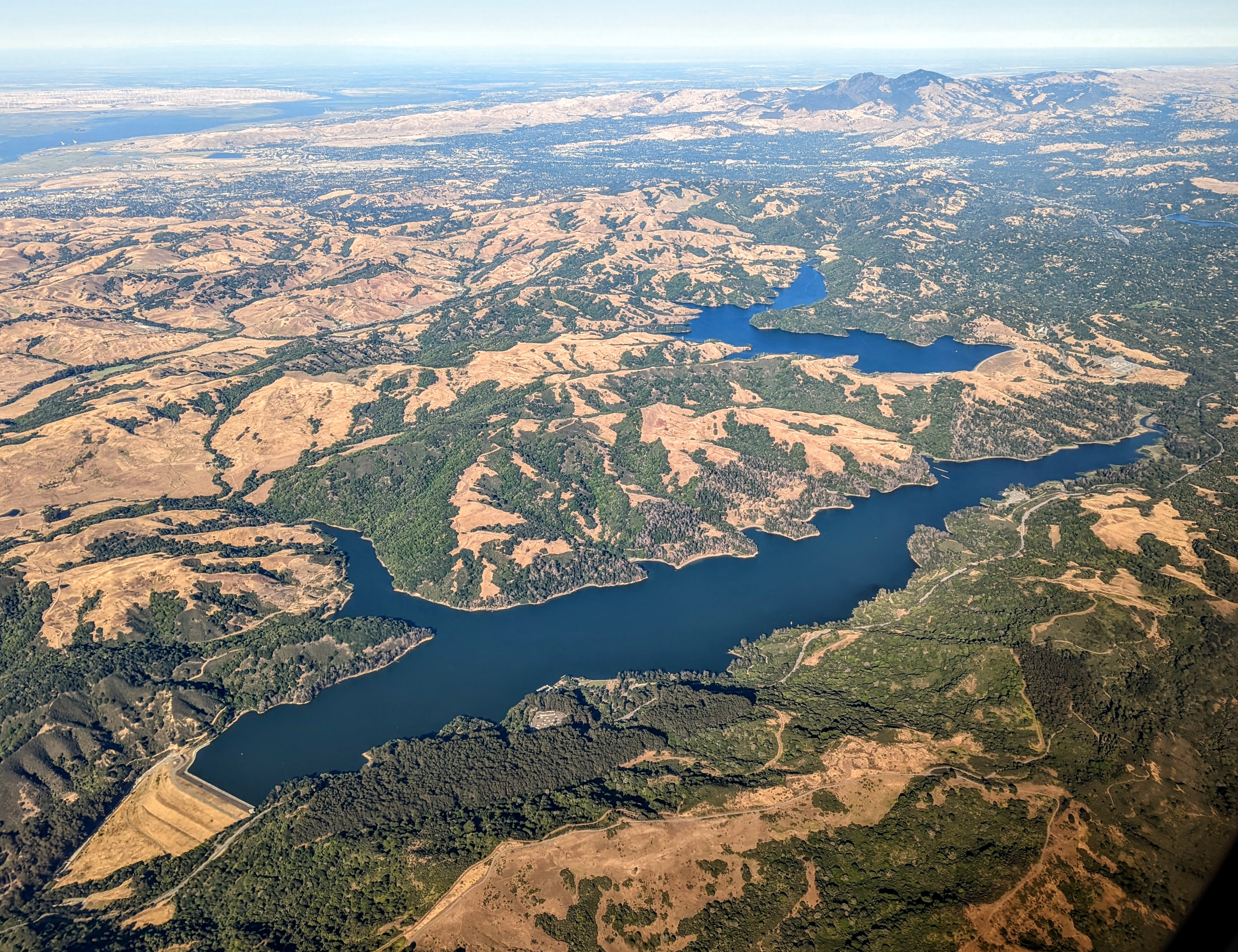
Aerial view of San Pablo Reservoir, with dam at the left; Briones Reservoir behind

The earthen San Pablo Dam, built in 1919 (107 years ago), is located at the El Sobrante end of the reservoir, above Kennedy Grove. The reservoir has a total capacity of 38,600 acre-feet (47,600,000 m^{3}) and a watershed of 23.37 square miles (60.5 square kilometres). A water tunnel runs under the hills to the west from the reservoir to a pumping plant in Kensington. The San Pablo Dam Road runs along the west side of the reservoir. EBMUD's Briones Reservoir is in the hills southeast of the San Pablo Reservoir and drains into the reservoir.

Although the dam impounds the waters of San Pablo Creek, the great bulk of its water is imported via the Mokelumne Aqueduct from Pardee Reservoir located over a hundred miles to the east in the Sierra Nevada foothills.

== San Pablo Reservoir Recreation Area ==
San Pablo Reservoir from Inspiration Point in Tilden Park

EBMUD owns and maintains the San Pablo Reservoir Recreation Area, which consists of boating and fishing access to the reservoir itself, and some watershed land on the west side of the reservoir. EBMUD charges $7 for daily entrance into the park. The recreation area is managed under contract by Urban Parks Concessionaires (UPC) and includes a restaurant (the San Pablo Grill) and gift shop, where fishing permits can be purchased and boats can be rented. There are picnic areas, a children's play area and a boat launch ramp.

Because this reservoir is a storage facility for drinking water, swimming and wading are prohibited. Fishing, boating, and canoeing are allowed. However, to reduce the possibility of gasoline components in the reservoir, only four-cycle engines using MTBE-free gasoline are allowed.

There is a 5 1/2 miles (8.9 km) hiking and biking trail along the west side of the reservoir. Most of this trail is on the Old San Pablo Dam Road, replaced in the 1950s by the current San Pablo Dam Road. It is not possible to legally circumnavigate the reservoir on hiking trails. While there are trails on the east side of the reservoir to accommodate a circumnavigation, they are off-limits even to people with EBMUD Trail Permits, and the roadway on top of San Pablo Dam proper is similarly restricted.

Many anglers fish on the reservoir for smallmouth bass, white sturgeon, bluegill and crappie, along with the regularly planted trout and catfish. The California Office of Environmental Health Hazard Assessment (OEHHA) has developed a safe eating advisory for fish caught in the San Pablo Reservoir based on levels of mercury or PCBs found in local species.

San Pablo Reservoir was the potential venue for the rowing and canoe races in the case that San Francisco would host the 2024 Summer Olympics. This would not have been the first time the reservoir hosted a rowing regatta. Since May 2015, the Oakland Strokes have organized the USRowing Southwest Masters Regional Championships on San Pablo.

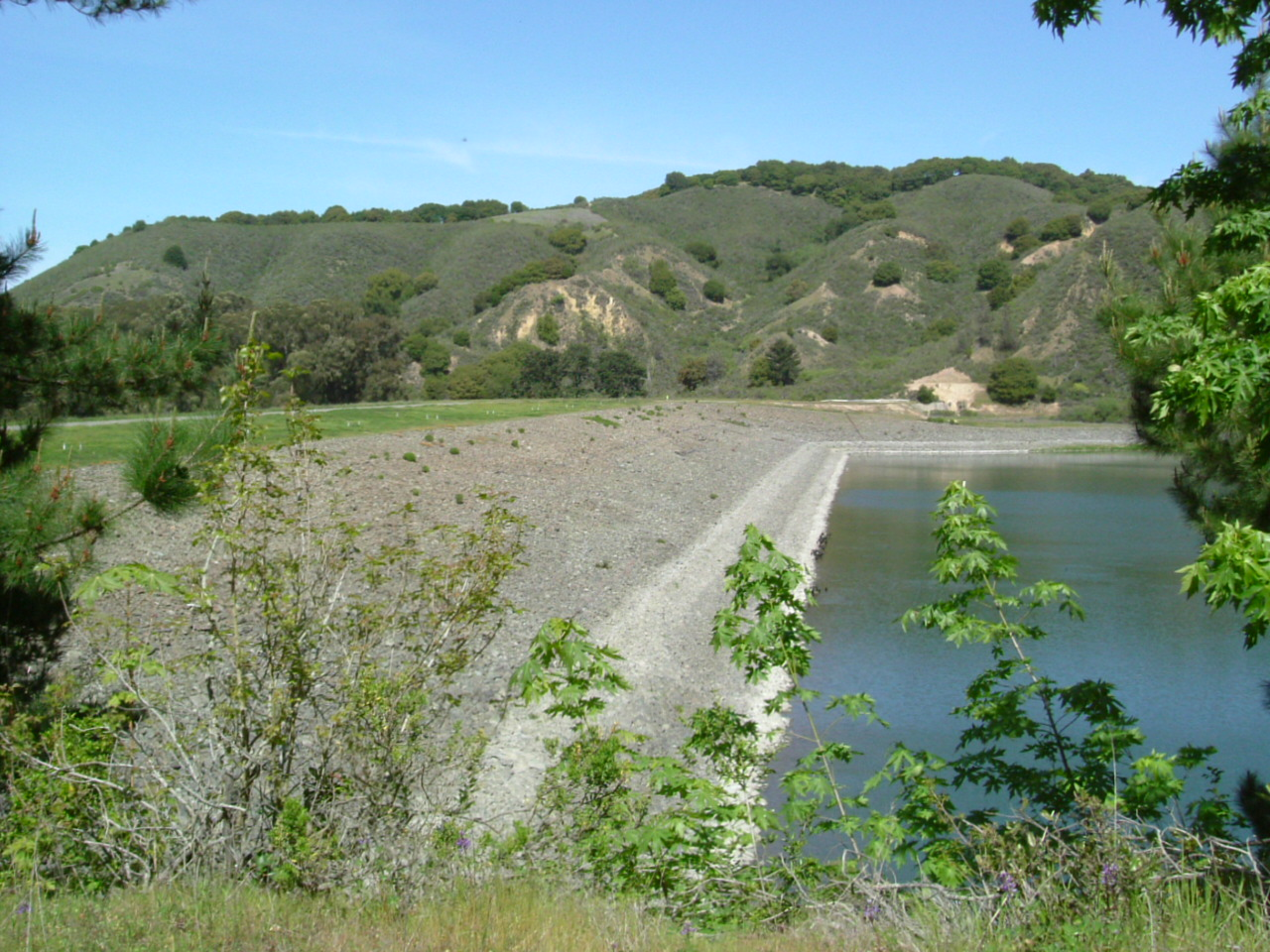
San Pablo Dam

== Seismic retrofit ==
In October 2004, a study commissioned by EBMUD concluded that a major earthquake on the Hayward Fault could cause the San Pablo Dam to settle as much as 35 feet (11 m). As a short-term measure, the district lowered the reservoir level by 20 feet (6.1 m) to create a 35-foot (11 m) buffer.

The dam was seismically retrofitted without going out of commission by mixing concrete into the soil at the toe of the dam. A new buttress layer has been added above that on the downstream side of the dam. Construction began in August 2008 and was completed in September 2010.

== See also ==
- List of lakes in the San Francisco Bay Area
