= Tilden Park Golf Course =

Golf course in Berkeley, California

- Location within the United States Location within California
- 37.888°N 122.243°W

Club information
- Location: Berkeley, California, U.S.
- Established: 1937.
- Type: Public
- Operator: East Bay Regional Park District
- Tota holes: 18
- Website: tildenparkgc.com
- Designed by: William P. Bell
- Par: 70
- Length: 6,294 yards (5,755 m)
- Course rating: 71.6
- Slope rating: 130

The Tilden Park Golf Course is a public golf course in the San Francisco Bay Area.

== Overview ==
Tilden Park Golf Course is a public golf course located within Tilden Regional Park in the San Francisco Bay Area. It was designed in 1936 and opened the following year. The course record of 62 is currently held by Luke Wasson.

== Scorecards ==
Tilden Park Golf Course
Tee	Rating/Slope	1	2	3	4	5	6	7	8	9	Out	10	11	12	13	14	15	16	17	18	In	Total
Blue	M: 71.6 / 130 W: 76.4 / 137	411	399	464	143	366	316	221	475	334	3129	395	234	350	504	352	329	206	395	400	3165	6294
White	M: 69.5 / 124 W: 73.8 / 132	404	385	377	137	327	297	201	467	320	2915	387	199	300	438	311	322	186	395	370	2908	5823
Red	M: 67.8 / 120 W: 71.6 / 124	401	376	356	123	316	270	170	460	286	2758	381	120	264	431	284	309	138	379	335	2641	5399
Par	Men's	4	4	4	3	4	4	3	5	4	35	4	3	4	5	4	4	3	4	4	35	70
Par	Women's	5	4	4	3	4	4	3	5	4	36	4	3	4	5	4	4	3	4	4	35	71
SI	Men's	1	7	3	11	9	17	5	13	15		10	6	2	16	14	18	8	4	12
SI	Women's	3	11	15	9	5	17	13	1	7		4	18	6	2	14	12	16	8	10
