= Berkeley Rose Garden =

City park in Berkeley, California, US

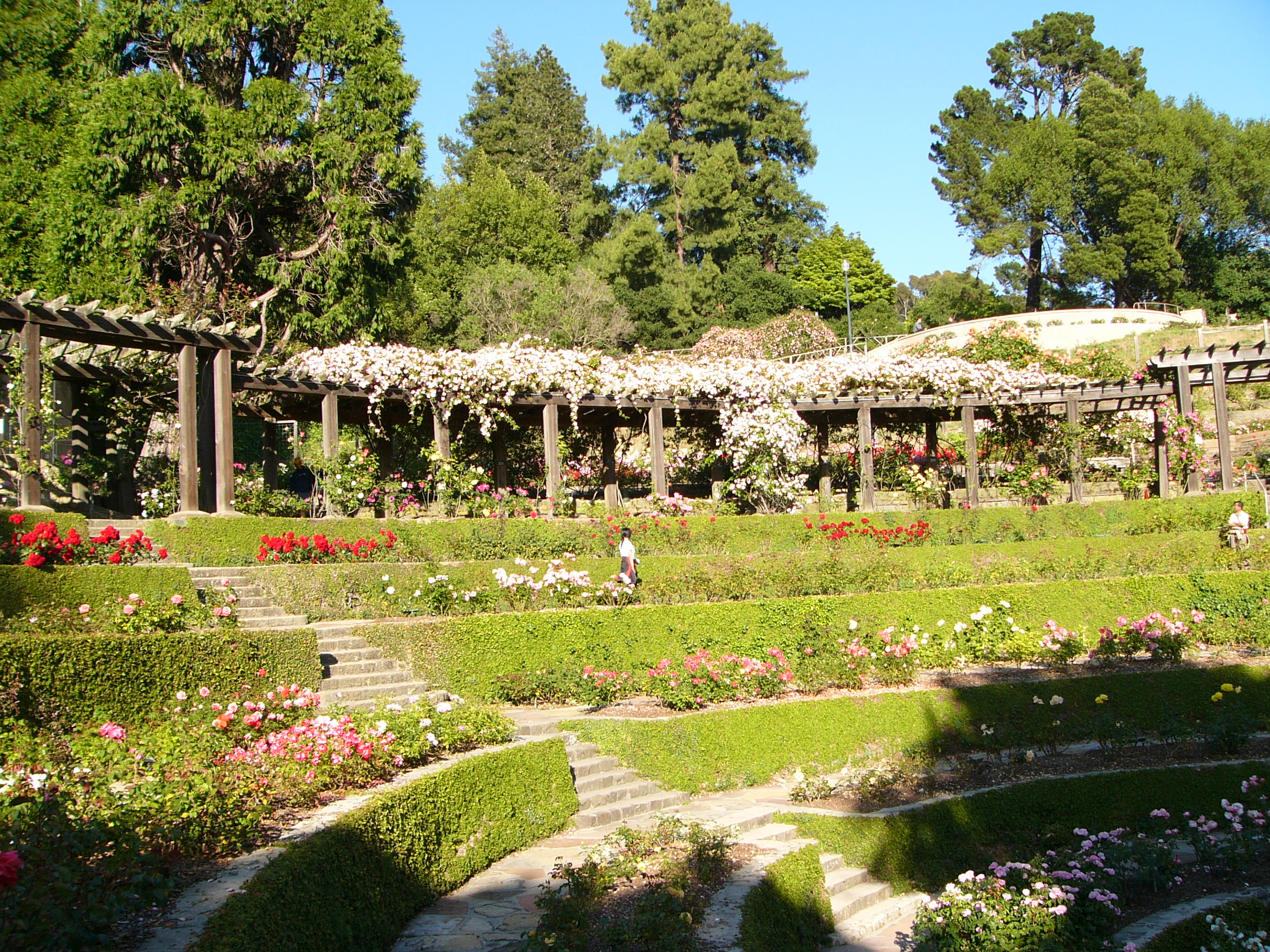
- Interactive map of Berkeley Rose Garden
- Type: City park
- Location: 1200 Euclid Avenue, Berkeley, California, United States
- Coordinates: 37°53′6.9″N 122°15′46.3″W
- Created: 1933
- Operator: City of Berkeley

The Berkeley Rose Garden is a city-owned park in the North Berkeley area of Berkeley, California. The rose garden is situated in a residential area of the Berkeley Hills between the Cragmont and the La Loma Park neighborhoods, occupying most of the block between Eunice Street and Bayview Place along the west side of Euclid Avenue, and west of Codornices Park.

== Rose Garden ==
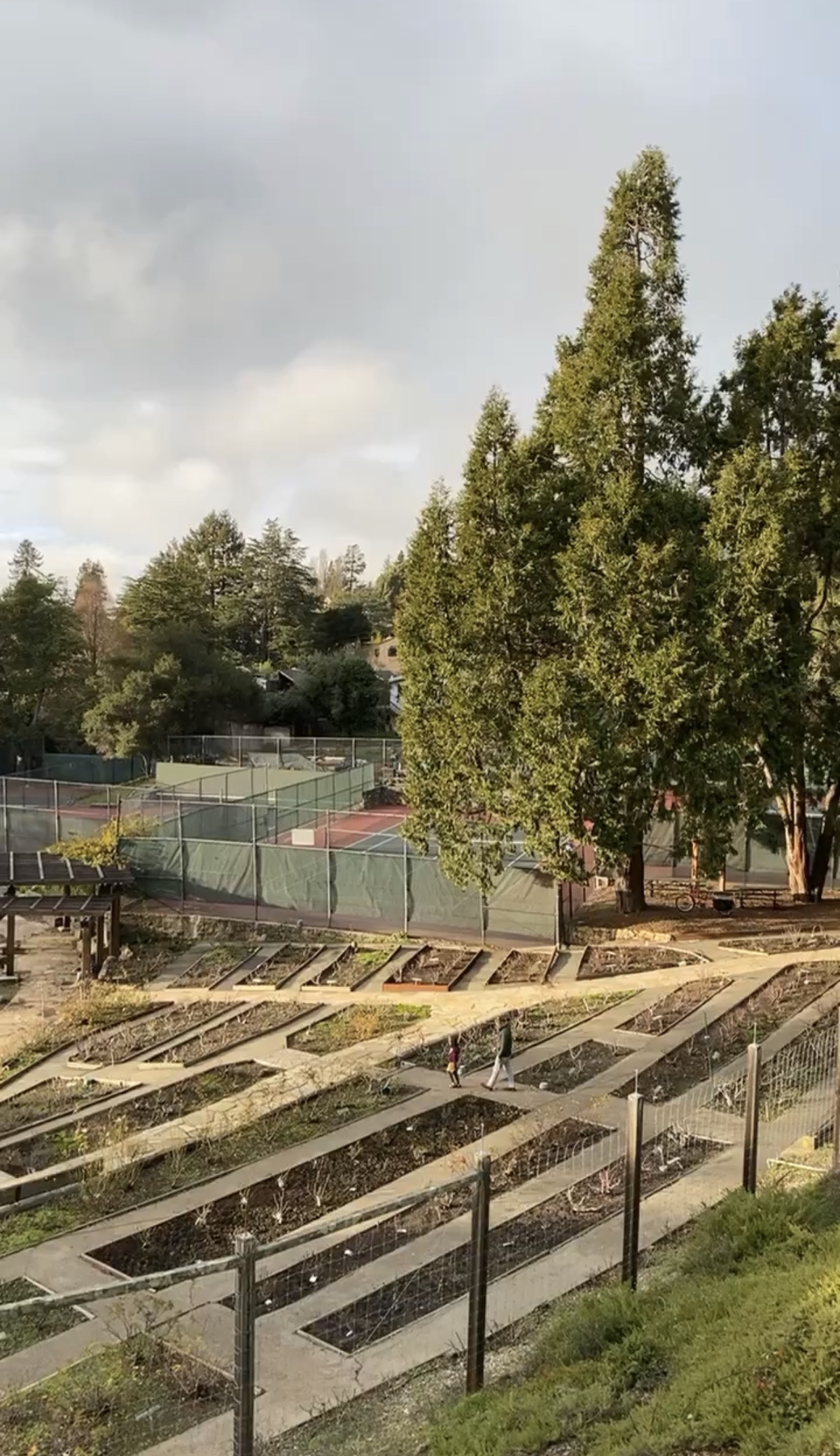
Garden in winter

The Berkeley Rose Garden is a terraced amphitheater in a small canyon with views of the city and bay of San Francisco and the Golden Gate. More than 100 rose varieties grow along the terraces, with maximum blooming occurring in mid-May. The park is bisected by Codornices Creek. The north side of the Rose Garden includes a set of tennis courts. The south side is a grove of coast redwoods, bay laurel and coastal live oak trees.

Construction of the rose garden began in 1933 with funds provided by the federal Civil Works Administration. Construction continued in subsequent years with funding from the California State Relief Administration and the federal Works Progress Administration. It opened in September 1937. Since its inception, the Rose Garden has been the site of a number of rose shows.

== Codornices Park ==
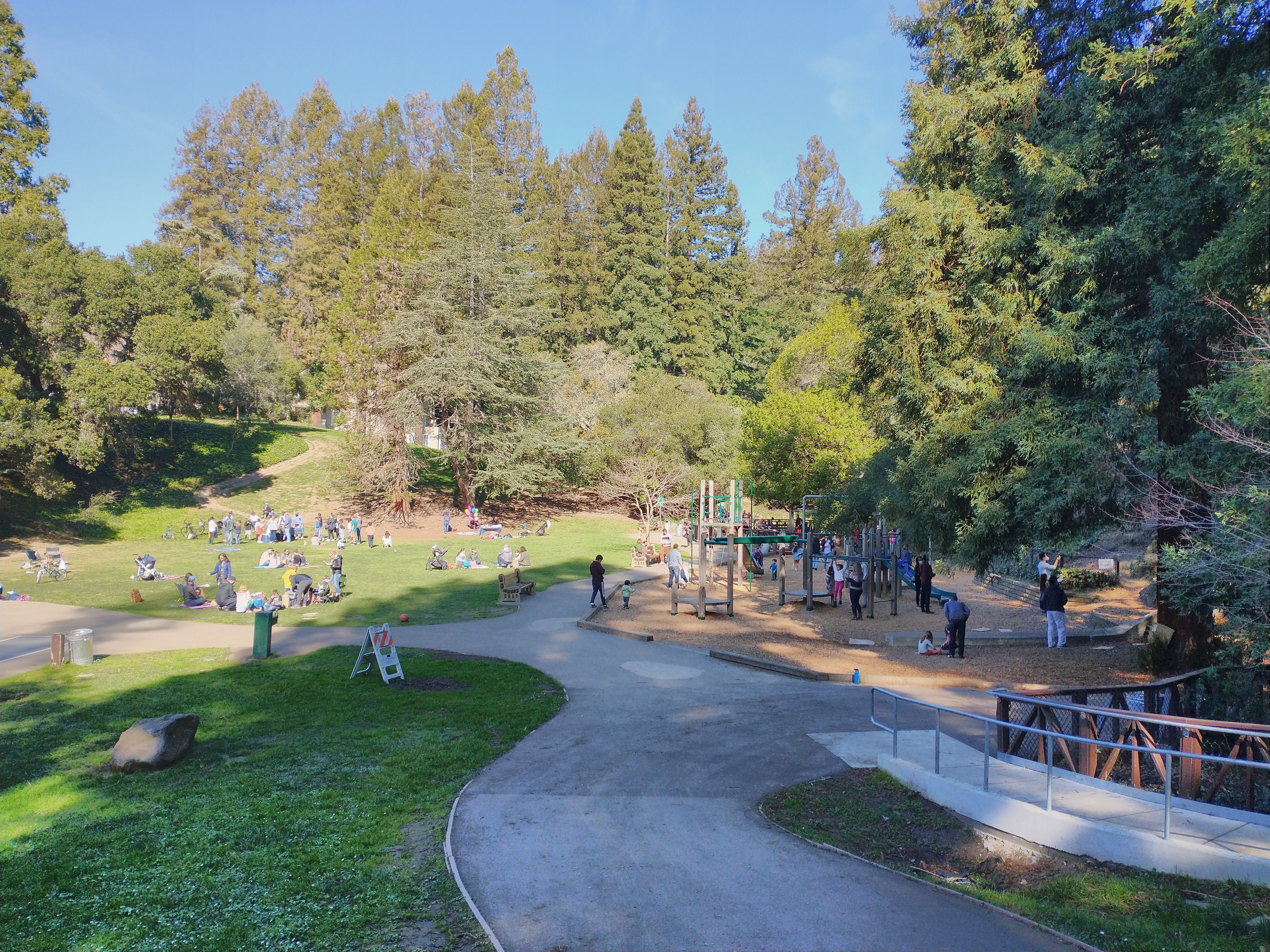
Part of Codornices Park

Across Euclid Avenue is Codornices Park, an older city park (established 1915) of which the Rose Garden was initially considered an extension. Codornices includes a large lawn, picnic area, children's play equipment and a long concrete playground slide. Here, two forks of Codornices Creek have their confluence, right along the line of the Hayward Fault. The clubhouse of the Codornices Club, a neighborhood improvement and social club, once stood on a lot adjacent to the top of the concrete slide.

A pedestrian tunnel runs under Euclid, connecting the Rose Garden with Codornices Park. In this section, from 1912 to 1928, before the Rose Garden was established, a 275-foot-long (84-meter) wooden streetcar and road trestle spanned Codornices Creek along Euclid. In late 1928 through early 1929, the trestle was filled in, a culvert laid through it for the creek, and the pedestrian tunnel constructed. Much of the fill originated from the excavation of a small hill on the UC Berkeley campus as part of the construction of Giannini Hall.

=== Concrete slide ===
The park's concrete slide, which is about 40 feet (12 m) long, is popular with families and people of all ages. The slide is shaded by a tree and is wide enough to allow a parent to ride down with a child. Visitors, including older children, often slide down sitting on pieces of cardboard to increase their speed. Another approach is to add a small amount of sand to the slide, before sliding down on cardboard, to further increase speed. People tend to leave cardboard near the slide for other visitors to use.

== See also ==
- John Hinkel Park, also in North Berkeley
- Morcom Rose Garden in nearby Oakland, California
