= List of gurdwaras in North America =

This is a list of gurdwaras in North America. A gurdwara is a Sikh center of worship or temple.

== Canada ==
- Guru Nanak Sikh Gurdwara in Surrey, BC
- Gur Sikh Temple in Abbotsford, BC
- Khalsa Diwan Society Vancouver in Vancouver, BC
- Ontario Khalsa Darbar in Mississauga, Ontario

== United States ==
=== California ===
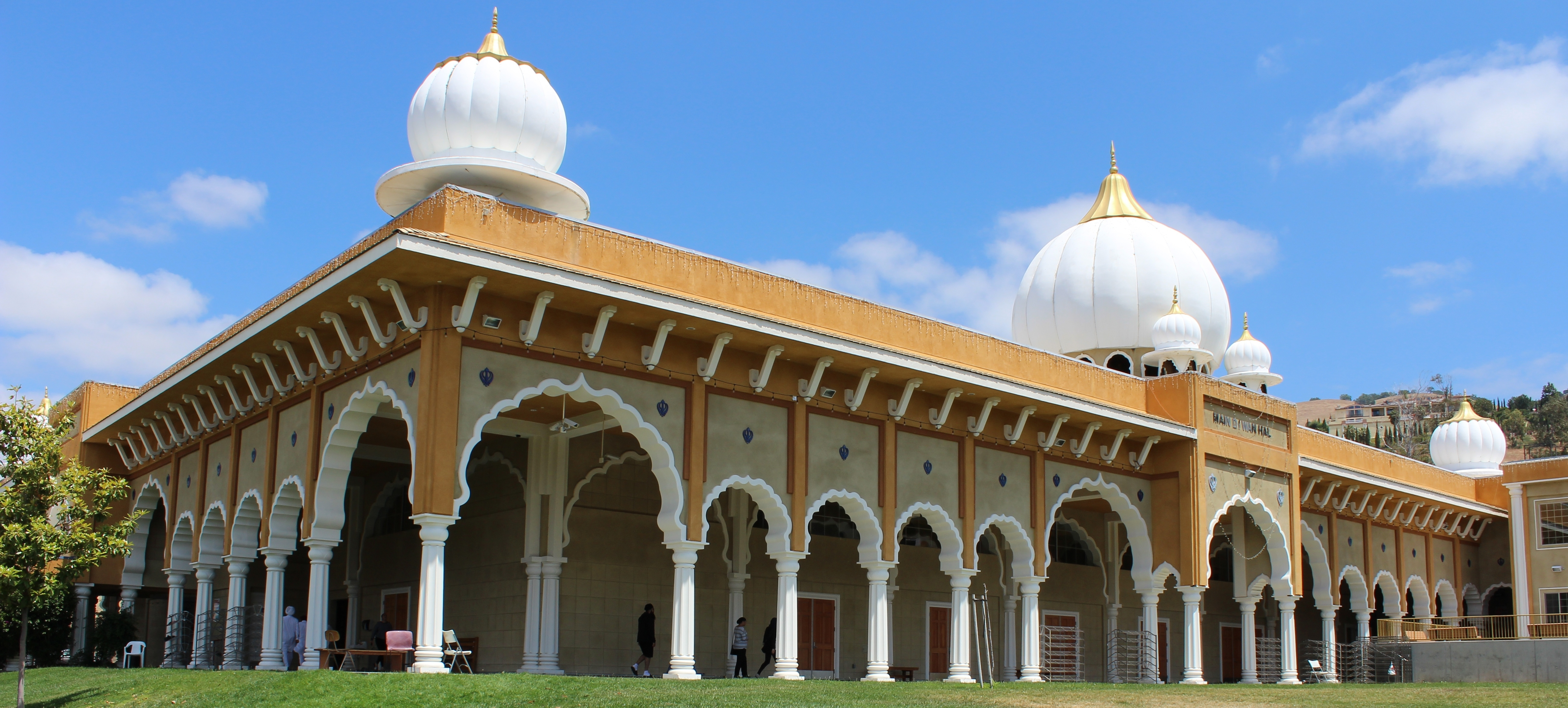
Gurdwara Sahib of San Jose

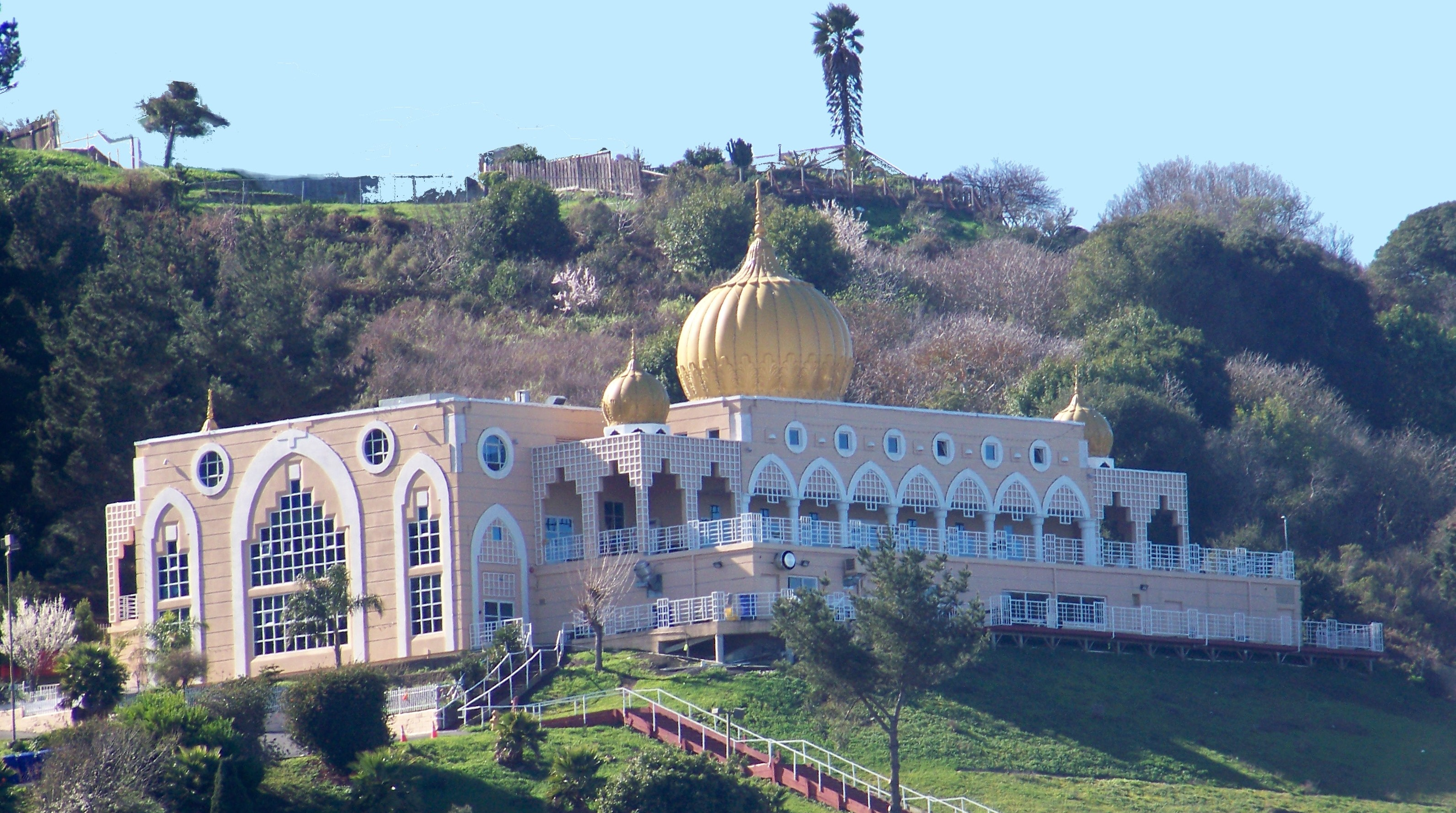
Gurdwara Sahib of El Sobrante

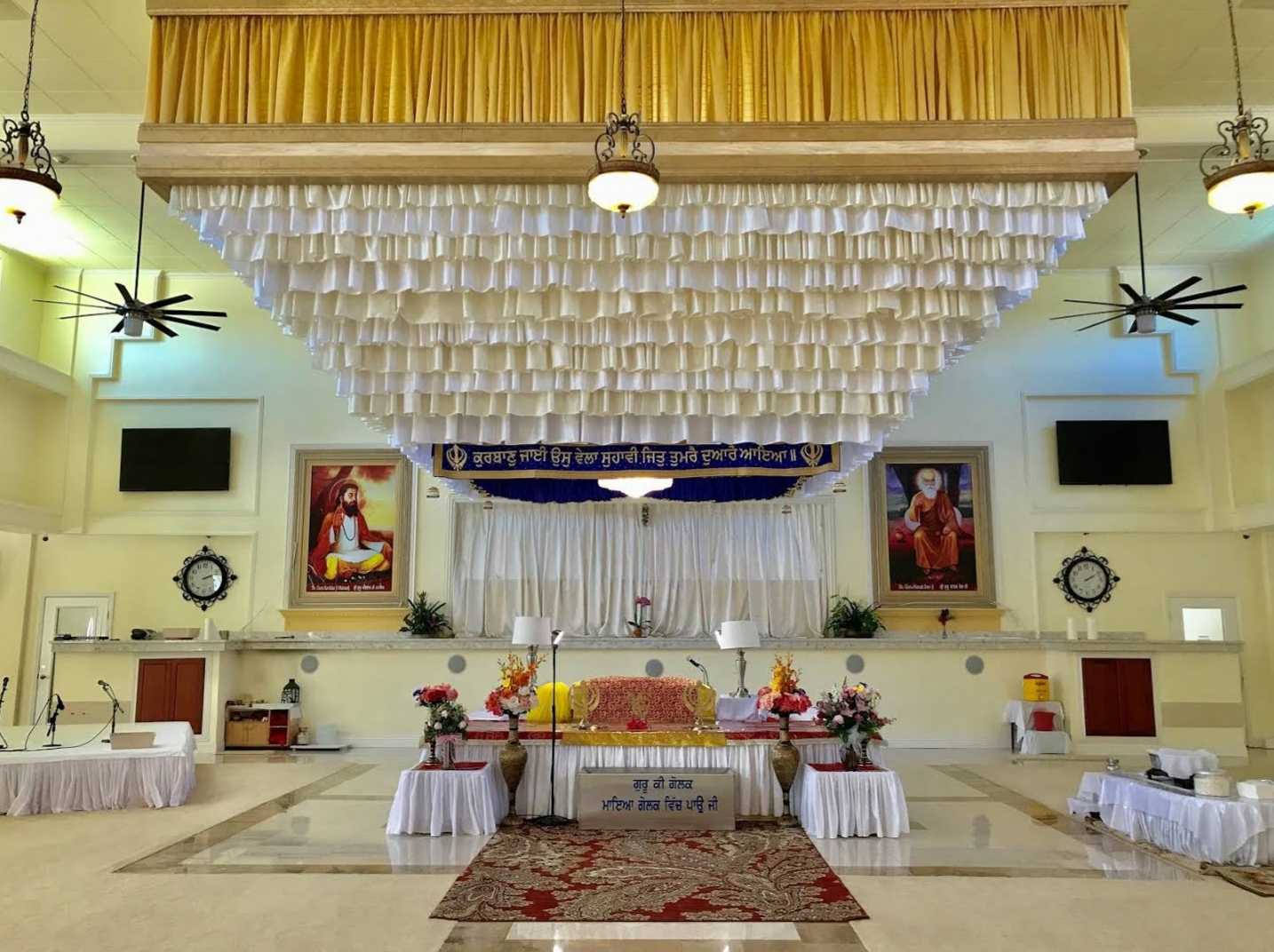
Gurdwara Guru Ravidass Temple, Pittsburgh

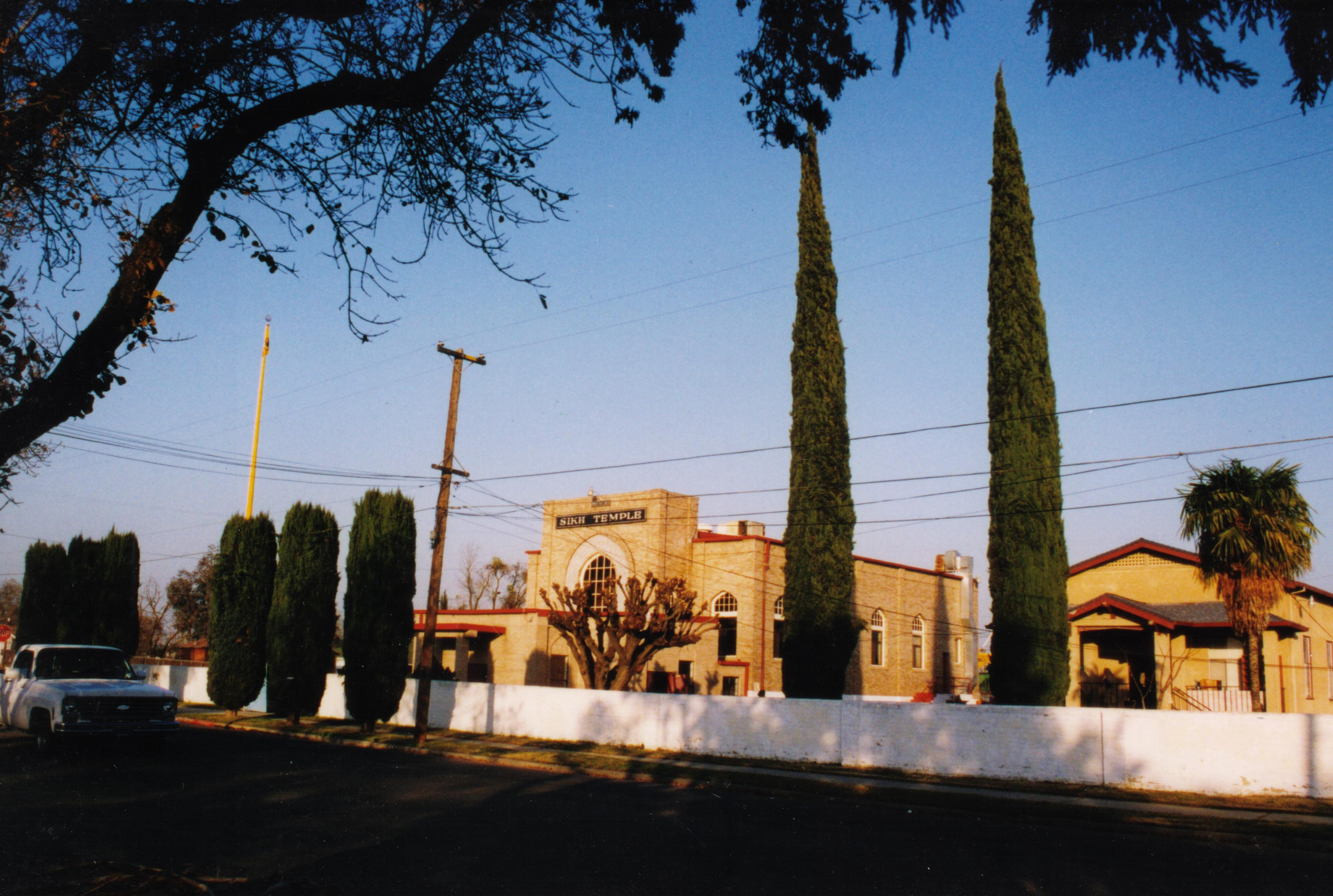
Gurdwara Sahib Sikh Temple in Stockton

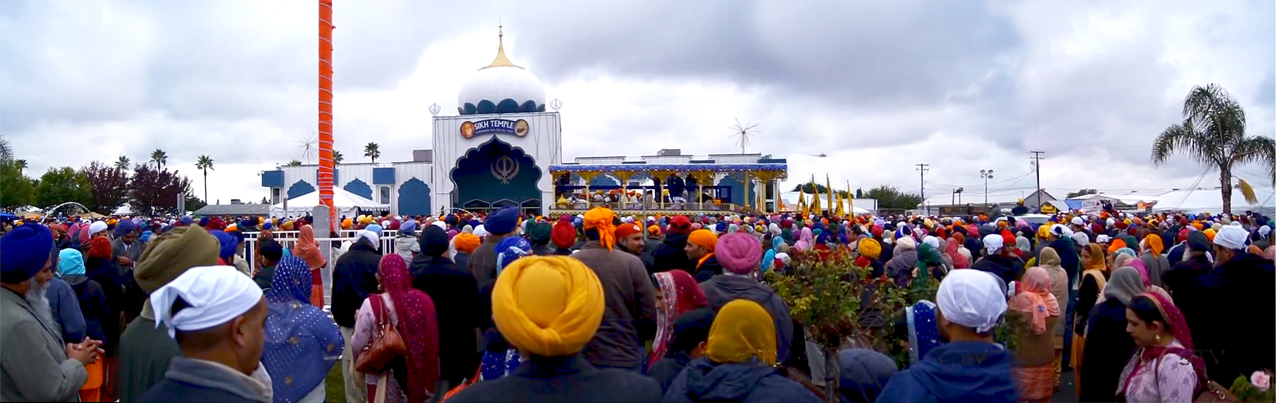
Gurdwara Sahib Yuba City

Name	City
Sikh Community Gurdwara	Alhambra
Alhambra Religious Gurdwara	Rosemead
Sikh Temple of Bakersfield	Bakersfield
Gurdwara Guru Dashmesh Darbar Bakersfield Inc.	Bakersfield
Gurdwara Guru Angad Darbar	Bakersfield
Guru Nanak Mission Sikh Center	Bakersfield
Gurdwara Nanaksar Darbar Langar Mata Sahib Kaur Ji	Bakersfield
Gurudawara shaheed Baba Deep Singh ji khalsa Darbar	Bakersfield
Gurudwara Sukh Sagar Sahib	Bakersfield
Gurdwara Singh Sabha	Buena Park
Gurdwara Buena Park	Buena Park
Valley Sikh Temple	Canoga Park
Gurdwara Sahib of Hayward	Hayward
Sikh Center of San Francisco Bay Area	El Sobrante
Gurdwara Sahib Temple	Fremont
Sikh Gurdwara of San Francisco	San Mateo
Sikh Center of San Francisco Bay Area	El Sobrante
Gurdwara Sahib Fremont	Fremont
The Sikh Foundation of the North Bay/Santa Rosa Gurdwara Sahib	Santa Rosa
Gurdwara Sahib of San Jose	San Jose
Gurdwara Sahib Sikh Temple	Stockton
Gurdwara Sahib Yuba City	Yuba City
Khalsa Care Foundation	Pacoima
Gurdwara Guru Ravidas Temple	Pittsburg
Gurdwara Guru Ravidass Sabha	Union City
Gurdwara Guru Ravidass Temple	Rio Linda
Guru Ravidass Sikh Temple	Yuba City
Gurdwara Guru Ravidass Sabha	Selma
Gurdwara Guru Ravidass Sabha	Fresno
Hollywood Sikh Gurdwara	Los Angeles

=== District of Columbia ===
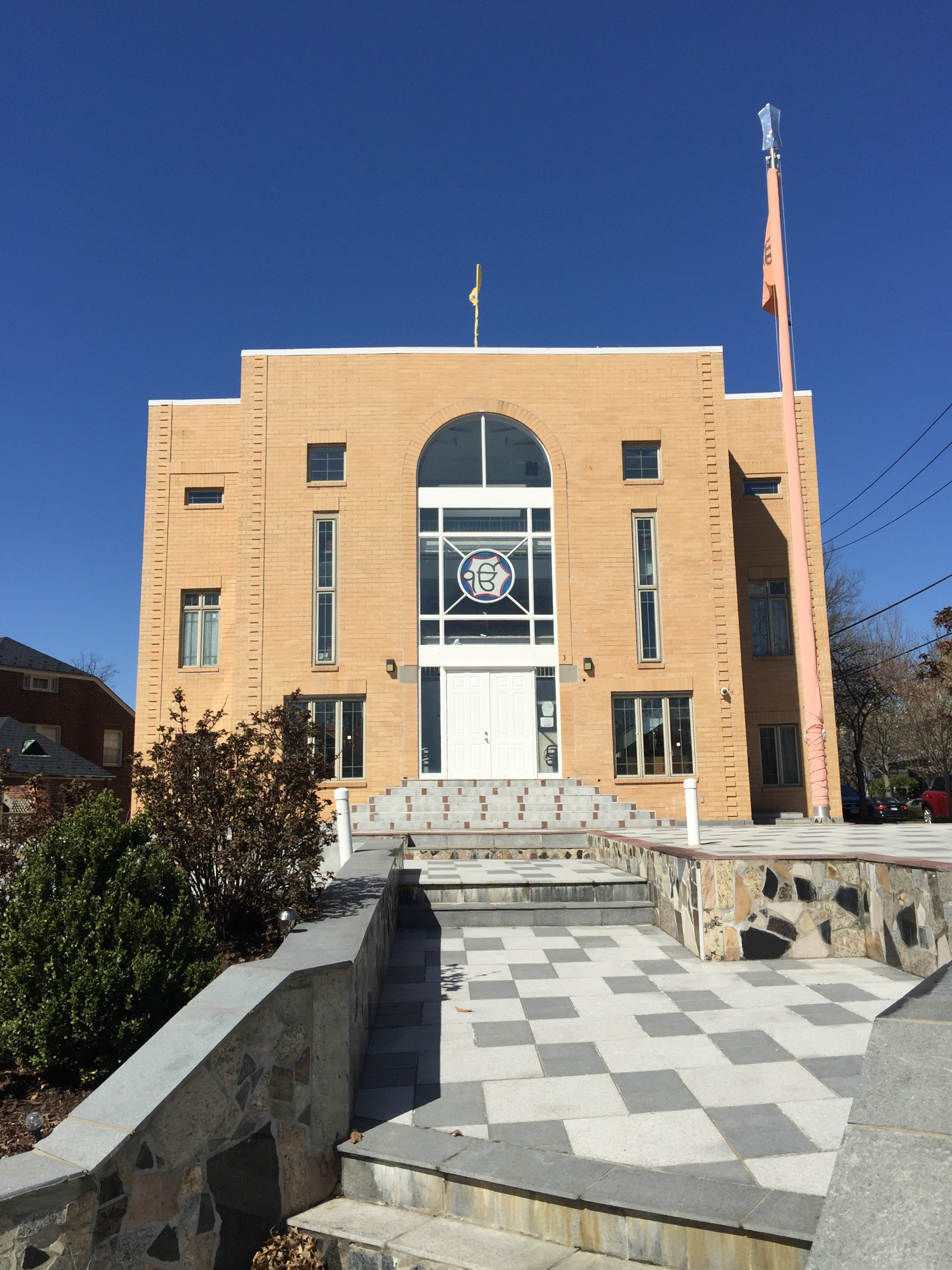
The National Gurdwara in Washington, DC

Name	City
The National Gurdwara	District of Columbia

=== Florida ===
Name	City
Sikh Gurdwara of Tampa Bay	Thonotosassa
Sikh Society of Florida	Southwest Ranches, Florida

=== Georgia ===
Name	City
SEWA Gurdwara Sahib	Roswell
Gurdwara Sahib-Sikh Study Circle	Stonecrest
Guru Nanak Mission Society of Atlanta	Norcross
Guru Singh Sabha of Augusta	Augusta

=== Illinois ===
Name	City
Sikh Religious Society of Chicago	Palatine
Illinois Sikh Community Center	Wheaton
Gurdwara Sahib of Chicago	Chicago

=== Maryland ===
Name	City
Guru Nanak Foundation of America	Silver Spring
Washington Sikh Center Gurdwara	Montgomery County
Gurdwara Gur Gian Sagar	Burtonsville
Sikh Association of Baltimore	Randallstown
Baltimore Sikh Society	Dundalk
Singh Sabha of Maryland	Dundalk

=== Michigan ===
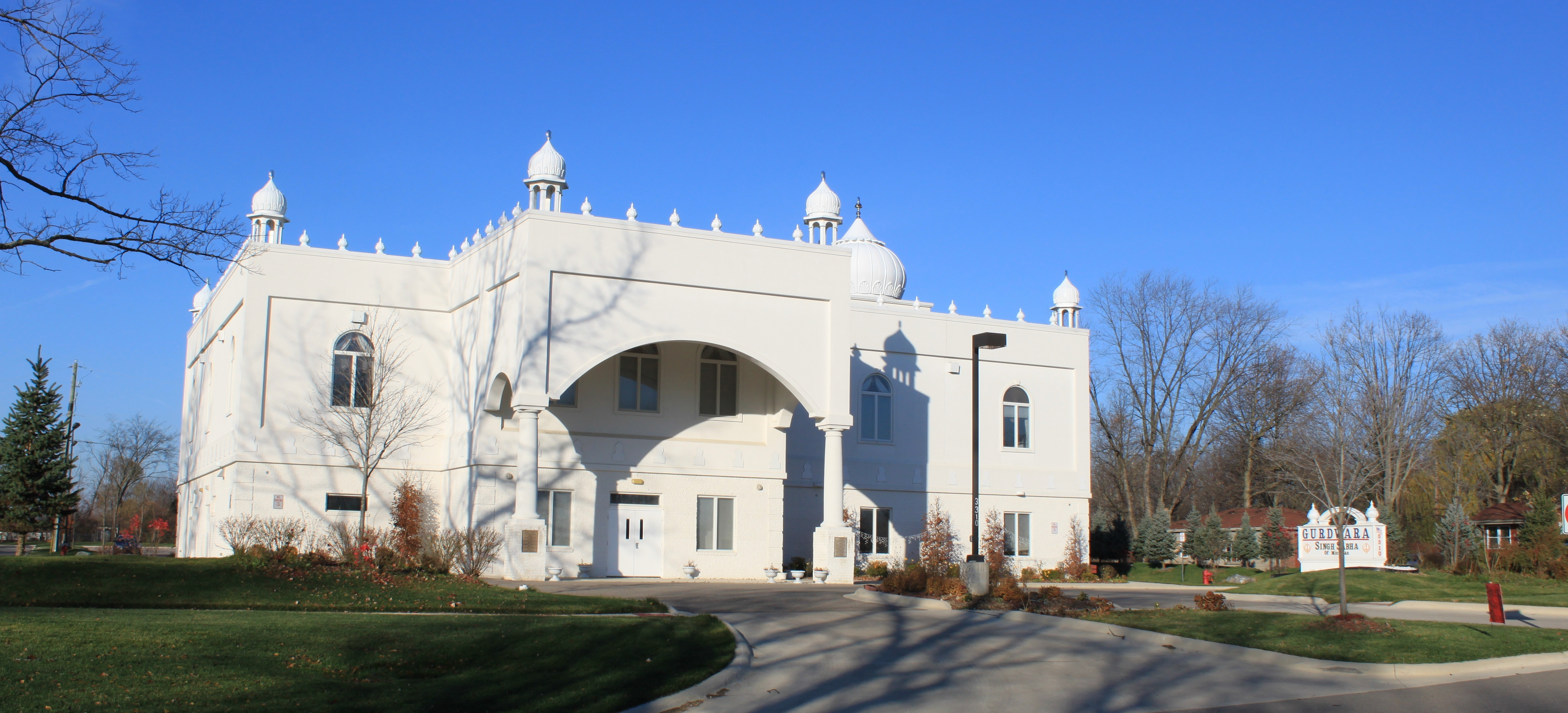
Singh Sabha of Michigan in Canton (suburb of Detroit)

Name	City
Singh Sabha of Michigan	Canton

=== Missouri ===
Name	City
Sikh Study Circle of St. Louis	St. Louis

=== New York ===
Glen Cove Gurdwara (Long Island)

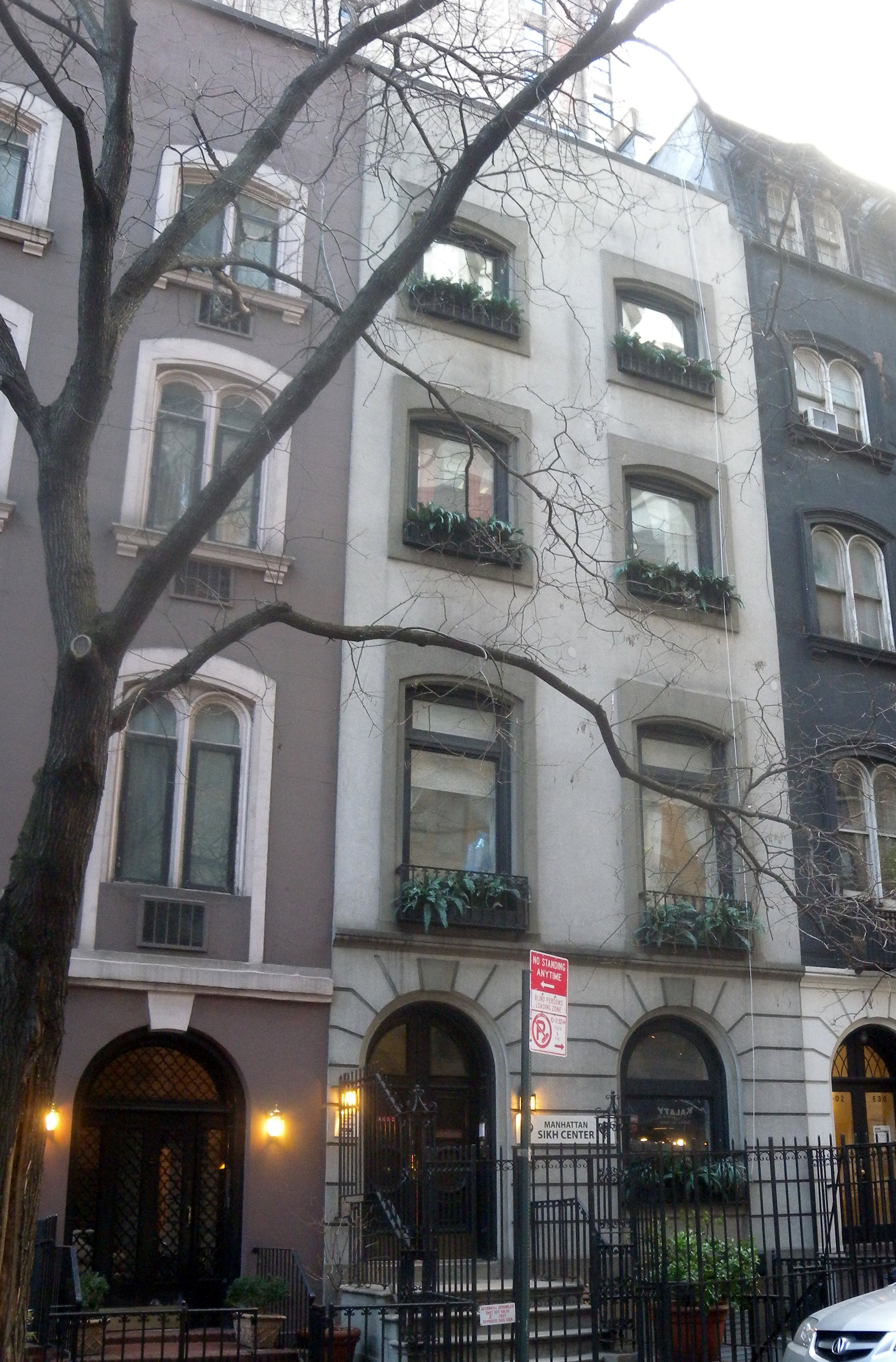
Manhattan Sikh Center in New York City

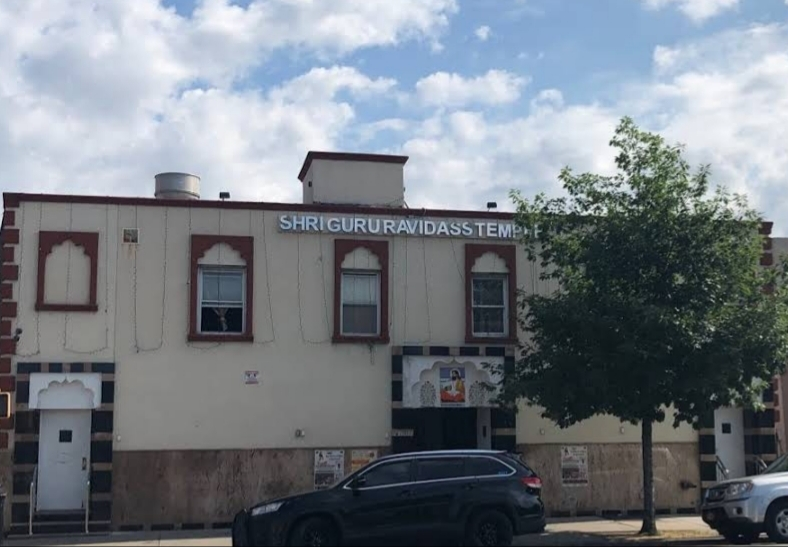
Shri Guru Ravi Dass Temple in Woodside (Queens)

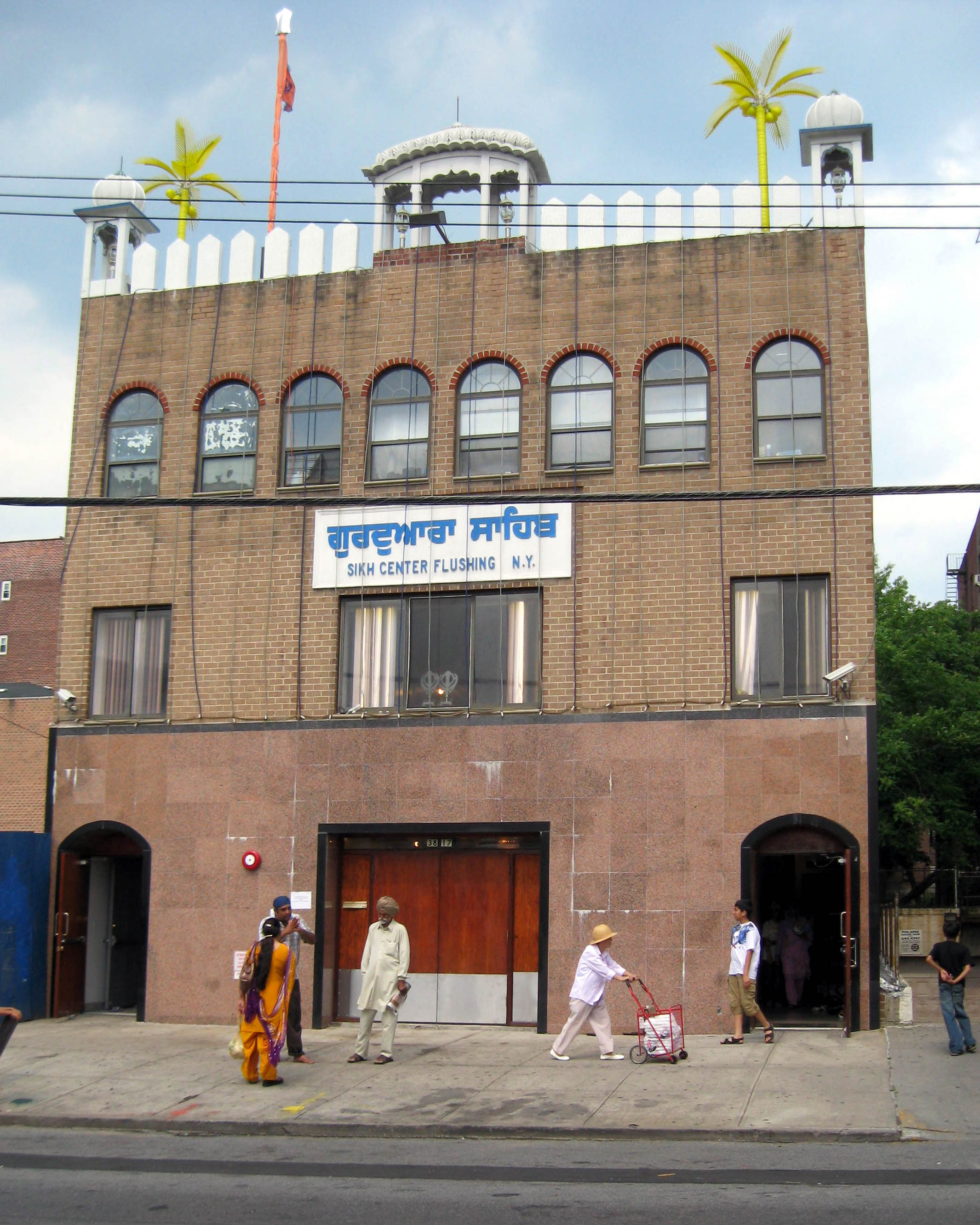
Sikh Center of New York Inc in Flushing (Queens)

Name	City
Glen Cove Gurdwara	Glen Cove
Manhattan Sikh Center	New York City
Shri Guru Ravi Dass Temple	Woodside
Sikh Center of New York Inc	Flushing

=== Ohio ===
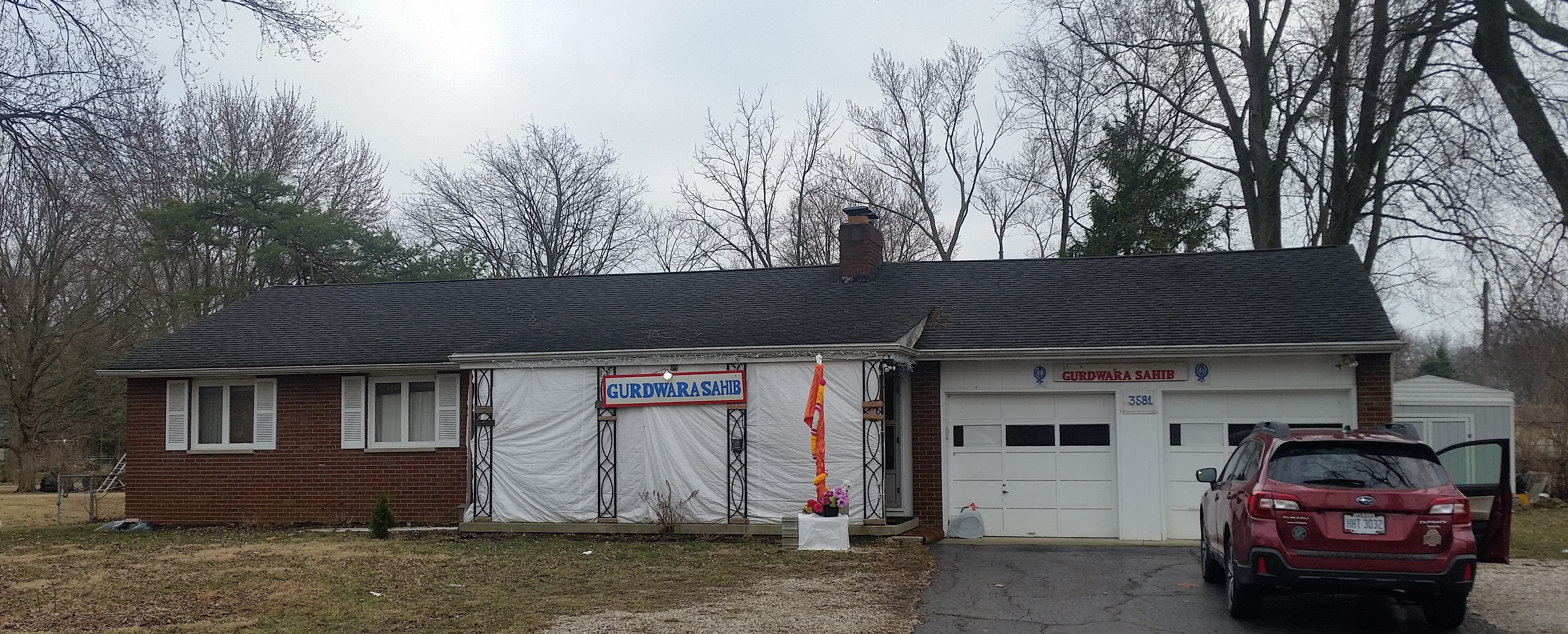
Gurudwara Sahib Guru Nanak Darbar in Columbus

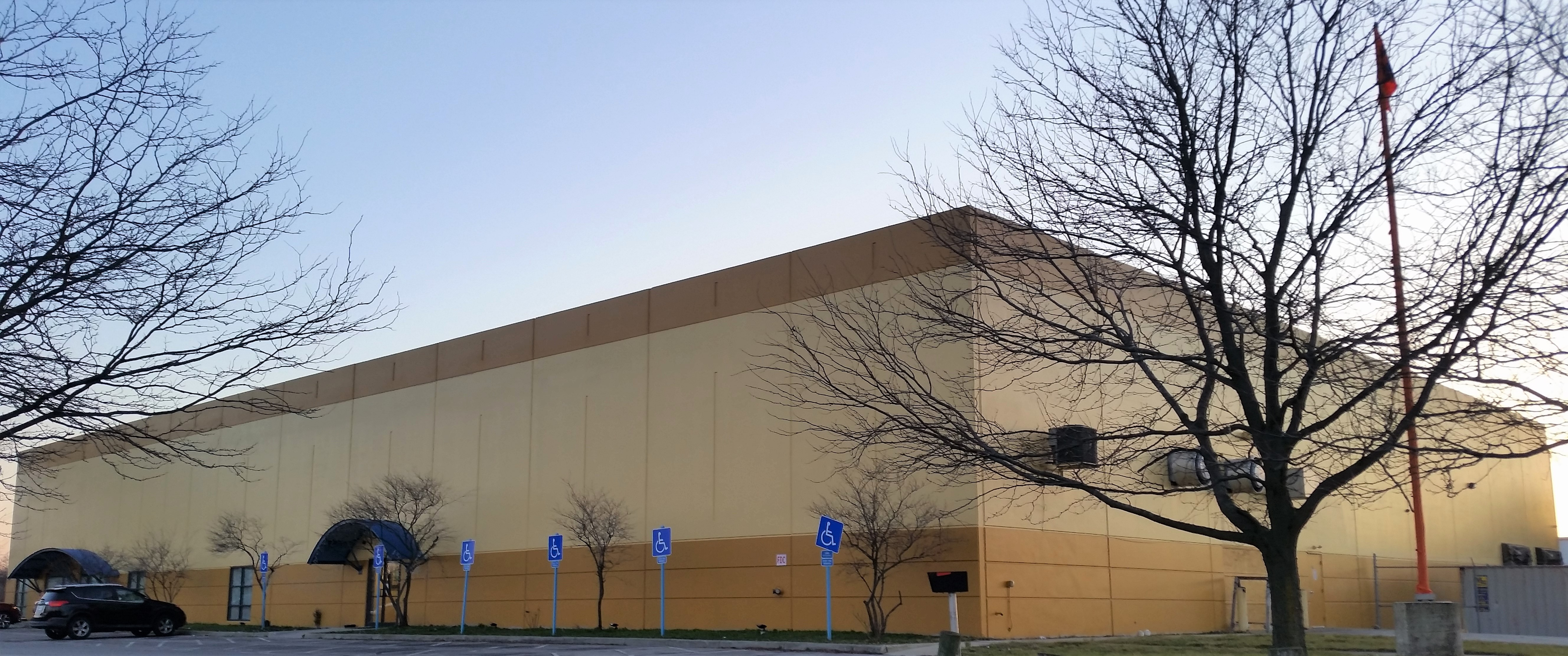
Guru Nanak Religious Society- Sikh Temple in Columbus

Guru Nanak Foundation	Richfield, Ohio
Gurudwara Sahib Guru Nanak Darbar	Columbus
Guru Nanak Religious Society- Sikh Temple	Columbus

=== Oregon ===
Name	City
Sikh Gurdwara of Eugene	Eugene

=== North Carolina ===
Name	City
Gurdwara Sahib Charlotte	Charlotte
Name	City
Atlantic Coast Sikh Association	Durham
Name	City
Sikh Association of the Triad	High Point

=== South Carolina ===
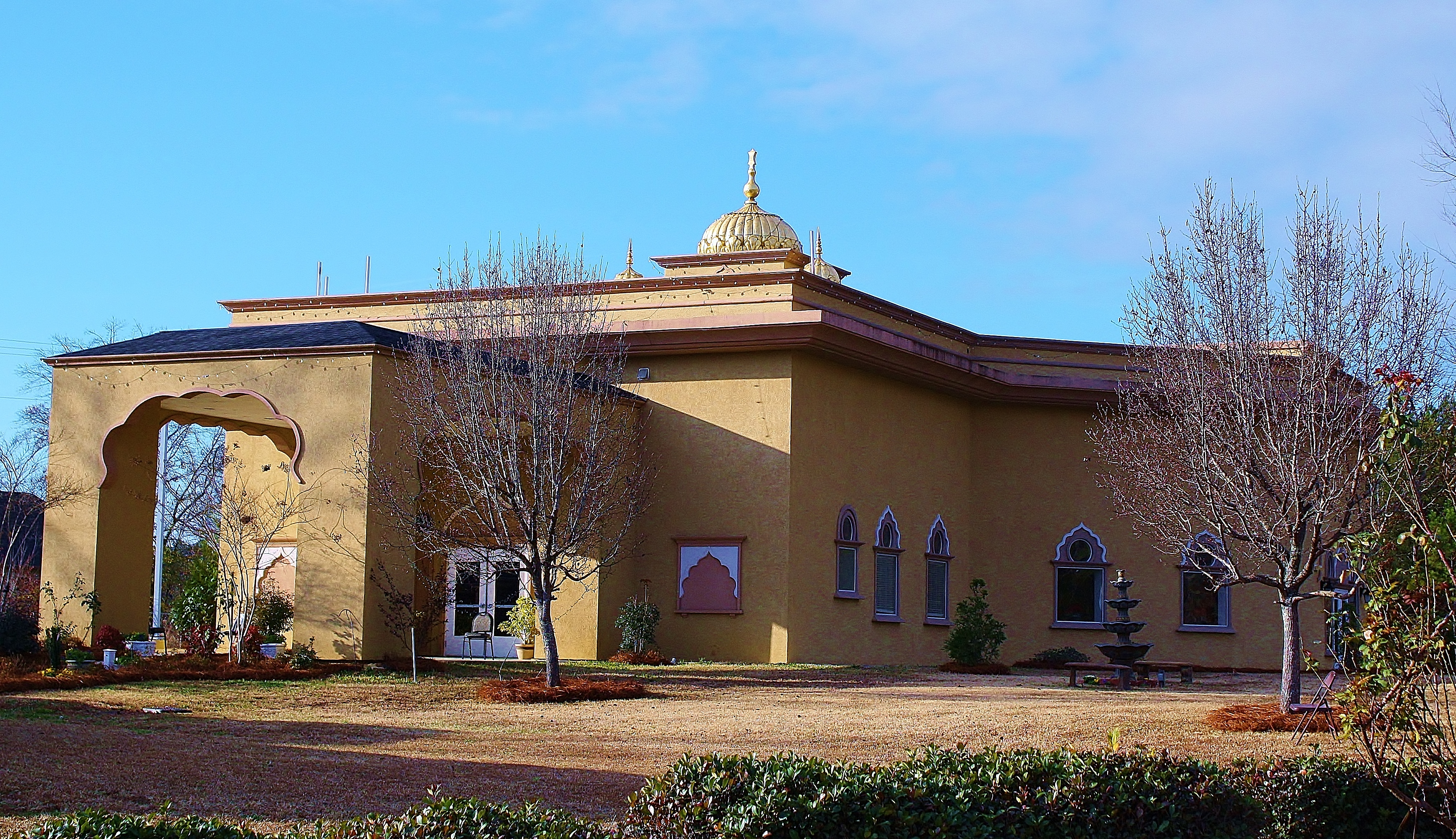
Sikh Religious Society of South Carolina in Chapin (suburb of Columbia)

Name	City
Sikh Religious Society of South Carolina	Columbia

=== Tennessee ===
Name	City
Sikh Sangat of East Tennessee	Knoxville
Nashville Gurdwara	Nashville

=== Washington ===
Name	City
Gurdwara Singh Sabha https://www.gsswa.org/	Renton
Gurdwara Sri Guru Tegh Bahadur Sahib Ji (Damdami Taksal)	Kent
Gurdwara Sacha Marag Sahib of Washington	Auburn
Nanaksar Gurdwara Seattle	Kent
Gurdwara Dashmesh Darbar	Tacoma
Gurdwara Guru Nanak Darbar	Olympia
Kitsap Sikh Gurdwara	Bremerton
Sikh Centre of Washington	Bothell
Guru Nanak Sikh Gurdwara	Marysville
Gurdwara Guru Nanak Parkash	Bellingham
Guru Ramdas Gurdwara Sahib	Vancouver

=== Wisconsin ===
Name	City
Sikh Religious Society of Wisconsin	Brookfield
Sikh Temple of Wisconsin	Oak Creek

== See also ==
- List of gurdwaras worldwide
