= Kennedy Grove Regional Recreation Area =

Recreation area in Richmond, California, U.S.

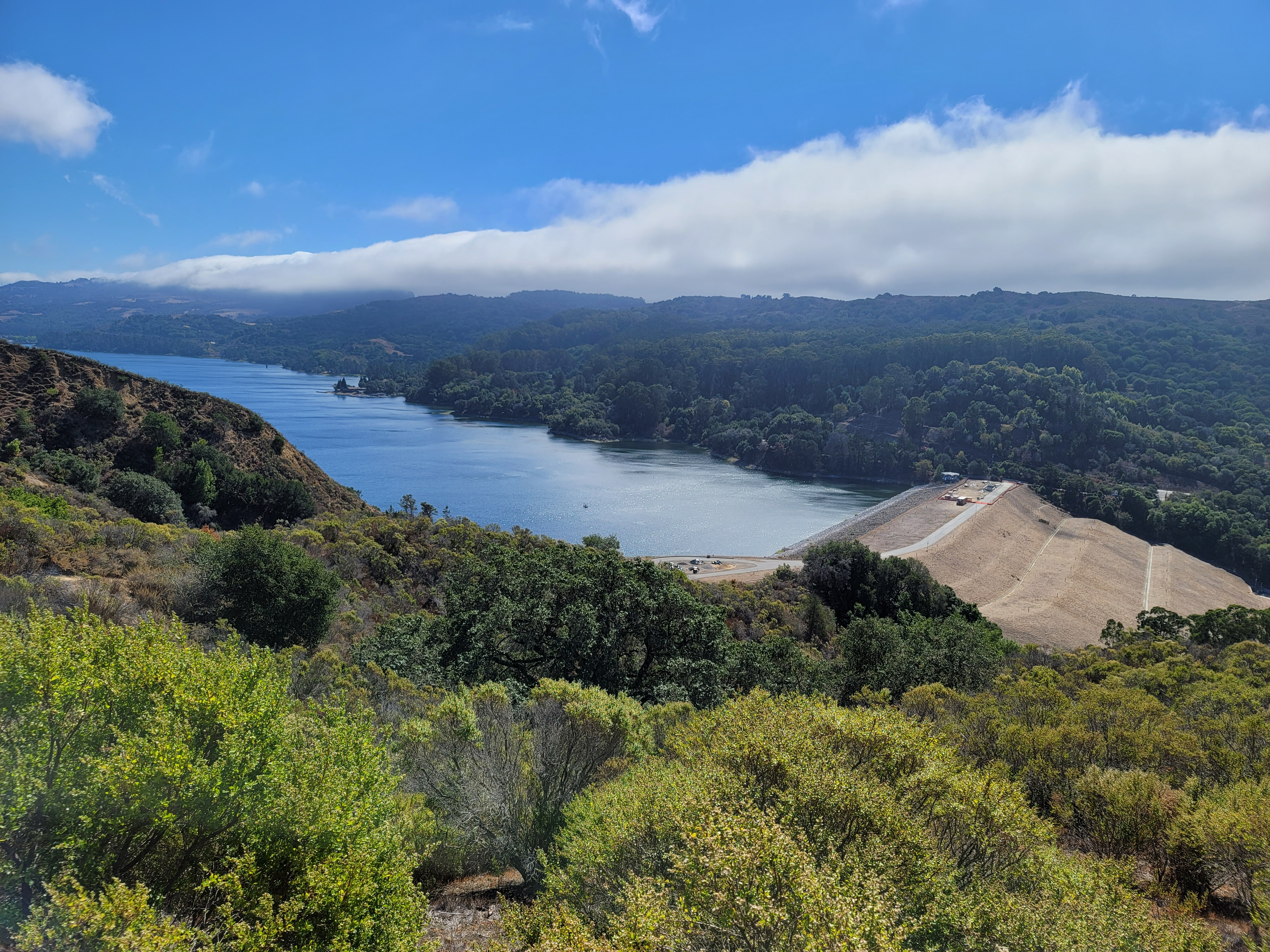
- A view of the San Pablo Dam from Kennedy Grove RRA
- Interactive map of Kennedy Grove Regional Recreation Area
- Location: Richmond Contra Costa County, California
- Area: 222 acres (90 ha)
- Created: 1967
- Operator: East Bay Regional Park District

Kennedy Grove Regional Recreation Area (KGRRA), also known simply as Kennedy Grove, is located in Richmond, Contra Costa County, California at the base of San Pablo Dam. Created in 1967, it contains a three-mile hiking trail with an elevation of 760 feet (230 m). The Grove features many large eucalyptus trees, picnic areas, volleyball nets, playgrounds, and horseshoe pits. Birdwatching is popular here because hawks are almost always spotted. Some hikers have reported seeing golden and bald eagles around the reservoir. There is no camping allowed. Parking is $5 with an extra $2 fee for a dog. Dogs have to be on the leash around the lawn, but they are allowed off the leash in remote parts of the park. The park is open from 8 a.m. to dusk.

== History ==
Before this 222 acres (90 ha) park became a protected area, it was home to wheat fields, the site of Ranchos and railroad stations for a railroad that ran from Oakland to Orinda through Berkeley and Richmond via El Sobrante. It was originally part of the 17,754-acre Rancho San Pablo. Francisco Castro acquired the rancho in 1823, and the grove later became the Clancy Ranch. By 1886 the railroad had scheduled stops from the California and Nevada railroad at Laurel Glen and Frenchman's Curve. The picnic areas around the park are named after some of the former railroad stops. The eucalyptus trees were planted in 1910. This park was named in honor of President John F. Kennedy and opened on October 22, 1967. It is now owned/operated by the East Bay Regional Park District (EBRPD).

== Trail locations ==
There are several trails located within the recreation area ranging from very easy to somewhat difficult. All trails lead out from the eucalyptus grove located near the base of the San Pablo Dam, adjacent to the parking area. Several trails will guide visitors through changing landscapes of native oak chaparrals and fern laden Bay laurel woodlands. A segment of the Bay Area Ridge Trail begins at Kennedy Grove and runs along the western shore of San Pablo Reservoir. Eventually the trail crosses San Pablo Dam Road and then climbs up the San Pablo Ridge. *NOTE:* An EBMUD permit is required for this hike.

== Wildlife ==
Seen from the Kennedy Grove area is the San Pablo Reservoir, where fishing is popular. The reservoir has trout and catfish and is recognized as one of the finest fisheries in the East Bay. However, a fishing license and EBMUD fishing permit is required. You can see flocks of ducks, shorebirds, geese, and white pelicans from the trails. Sometimes deer, bobcats, foxes and coyotes can be sighted. There are also species like quail, dove, and wild turkeys. Some birds of prey that are known to take the skies above Kennedy Grove are eagles, owls, hawks, and ospreys.

== Weather ==
The area surrounding San Pablo Dam is fairly temperate. The East Bay is warmer than the Peninsula. Summer temperatures tend to vary from 60 to 100 degrees. Fog is very common. Rainfall occurs mostly during the months of October through March. The temperatures can dip below 32 degrees in the winter.

== Activities ==
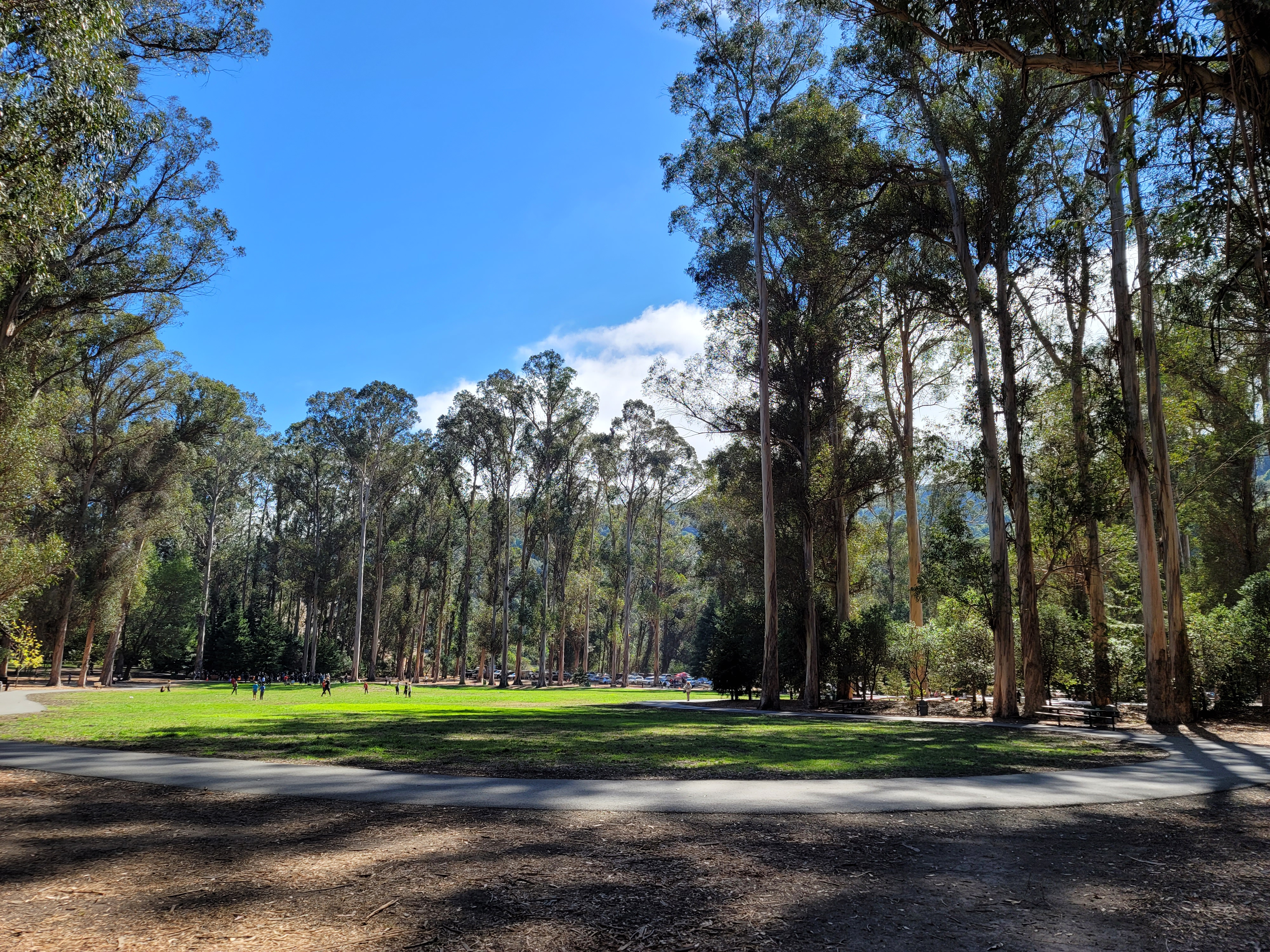
The picnic area and eucalyptus trees surrounding it in the park.

Popular activities include hiking, day camps, bird watching, walking around the lawn asphalt path, and special events such as cross-country meets. The eucalyptus grove is frequently used as a desirable setting for company picnics, family reunions, and other group events.

Fern Cottage is an indoor/outdoor facility designed for a capacity of 60 guests (seated) or 120 guests (standing). L-shaped, it has a kitchen and two separate rooms, with an enclosed private backyard and two decks.

== Access ==
Kennedy Grove's main entrance is off San Pablo Dam Road in El Sobrante. The park is open year-round, starting at 8:00 AM daily. Closing time depends on the month: November - February, 4:30 PM; March, 6:00 PM; April, 7:00 PM; May - August, 8:00 PM; September, 7:00 PM; October, 6:00 PM. Parking fees are charged on weekends and holidays from April 1 to October 31 and are $5.00 per car, $4.00 per trailered vehicle, and $25.00 per bus. Visitors may bring dogs, and there is a dog fee of $2.00 each.
