= Nation's Giant Hamburgers =

American restaurant chain

Nation's Foodservice, Inc.
- Trade name: Nation's Giant Hamburgers
- Type: Private company
- Industry: Fast food restaurant, Diner
- Founded: San Pablo, California, USA (1952; 74 years ago)
- Headquarters: 11090 San Pablo Avenue, Suite 200; El Cerrito, California, 94530-2365
- Area served: Northern California; North Texas
- Website: Official website

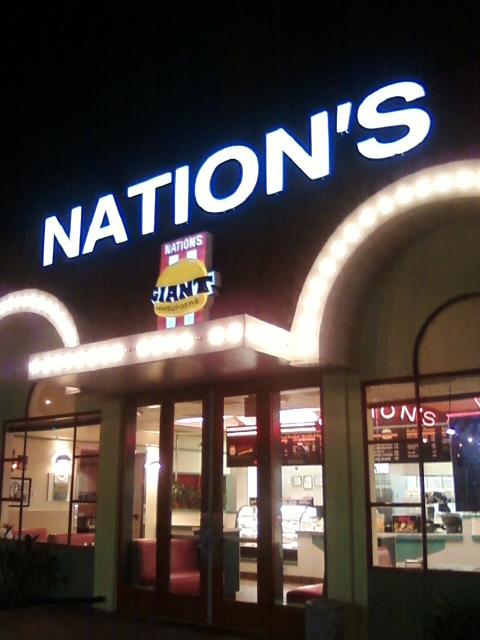
Outside of Nation's in El Cerrito, California

Nation's Foodservice, Inc., doing business as Nation's Giant Hamburgers or simply Nation's, is a privately held El Cerrito, California-based regional fast food diner chain. Its menu includes hamburgers, hot dogs, sandwiches, breakfast items, and pies. The chain, founded in 1952, largely operates in the San Francisco Bay Area, especially the Greater East Bay, with some locations also in the Sacramento area and the Stockton area. In 2024, the company expanded into the Dallas–Fort Worth metroplex in Texas.

== History ==
Russ Harvey bought a six-stool hot dog stand in 1952 near the corner of San Pablo Avenue and San Pablo Dam Road in San Pablo, California, with money he obtained through the sale of his 1948 Buick. He subsequently added hamburgers to the menu of the hot dog restaurant with a focus on large portions. After it became successful, he changed the restaurant's name to Harvey's Giant Hamburgers.

In 1960, local teenager Dale Power was hired as a janitor and continued his employment from high school to his graduation at the nearby University of California, Berkeley. In 1970, he purchased his first restaurant in the Jack London Square District in neighboring Oakland. He christened it Nation's; the name was decided upon under the belief that they sold the best hamburgers in the nation. At this point Russ Harvey changed the name of his restaurant to Nation's as the two men became partners under a unified brand.

More items were then added to the menu over time including breakfast, lunch, other dinner items, and pies.

In 1994, Power became the company's president after Harvey retired. Originally only in the San Francisco Bay Area, the company then expanded east into Sacramento and San Joaquin counties. In 2024, the chain opened its first locations outside of California in the Dallas–Fort Worth metroplex in Texas.

== Locations ==
As of 2025, the chain has 31 total locations across the San Francisco Bay Area, the Sacramento area and the Stockton area. Nine are in Contra Costa including: Brentwood, Concord, El Cerrito, Moraga, Orinda, Pleasant Hill, Pittsburg, San Pablo, and Tara Hills. The original San Pablo location is no longer standing, and the current San Pablo Nation's is on the same site as the original restaurant at San Pablo Avenue and San Pablo Dam Road.

There are nine Nation's in Alameda County: Alameda, Berkeley, Castro Valley, Fremont, Hayward, Livermore, Oakland, Pleasanton, and San Leandro. The Oakland location remains in the Jack London Square District.

There are four in Solano County, located in Benicia, Fairfield, Vacaville, and Vallejo. There are two in San Mateo County, located in Daly City and South San Francisco. There is only one Nation's in Napa in the county by the same name.

Four restaurants are in the Central Valley cities of Lodi, Modesto, Stockton, and Tracy in San Joaquin County. Expansion in 2011 brought the chain into Sacramento County; locations there include Citrus Heights and Sacramento.

The first restaurants outside of California opened in 2024 in the Dallas–Fort Worth metroplex in Texas. Locations include Arlington, Denton, and Sunnyvale.

Two locations were scheduled to open in the latter half of 2025; Pacifica, which will mark a third location in San Mateo County and San Jose which will be the first location in Santa Clara County.

== See also ==
- List of hamburger restaurants
