= Harpreet Sandhu =

Harpreet Sandhu may refer to:

- Harpreet Sandhu (actor) (born 1979), Indian actor and filmmaker
- Harpreet Sandhu (politician), Indian American politician and community activist
