= Gurdwara Sahib of San Jose =

Gurudwara in San Jose

Coordinates: 37.32596°N 121.766624°W

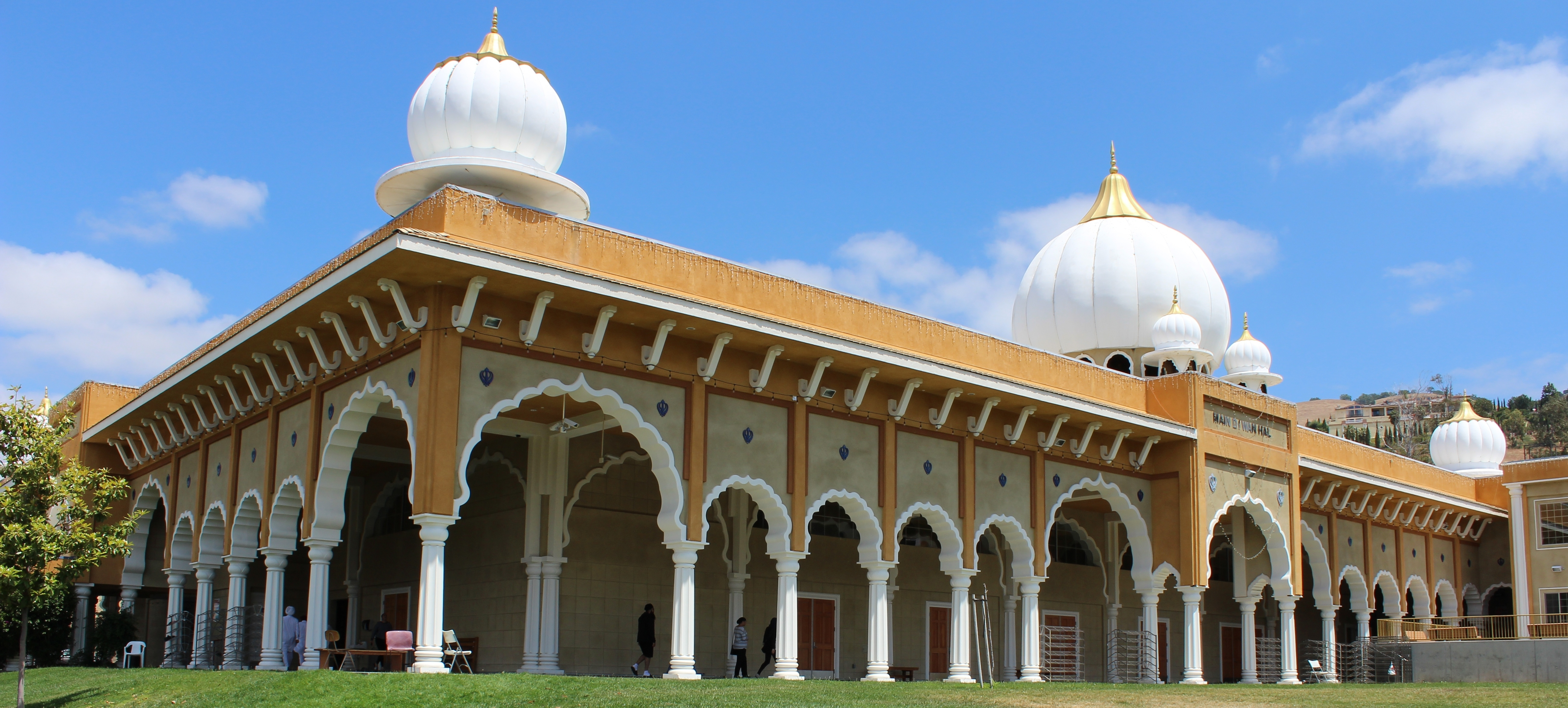
- Front of Sikh Gurdwara - San Jose

Religion
- Affiliation: Sikhism

Location
- Location: San Jose, California, USA
- Interactive map of Gurdwara Sahib of San Jose

Architecture
- Style: Sikh architecture
- Completed: April 2011

Website
- Official website

The Sikh Gurdwara of San Jose is a gurdwara (a Sikh place of worship) located in the Evergreen district of San Jose, California. It was founded in 1984 by leaders of the then-rapidly growing community of Sikhs in the area. It is the largest Gurdwara in the world outside of India.

== History ==
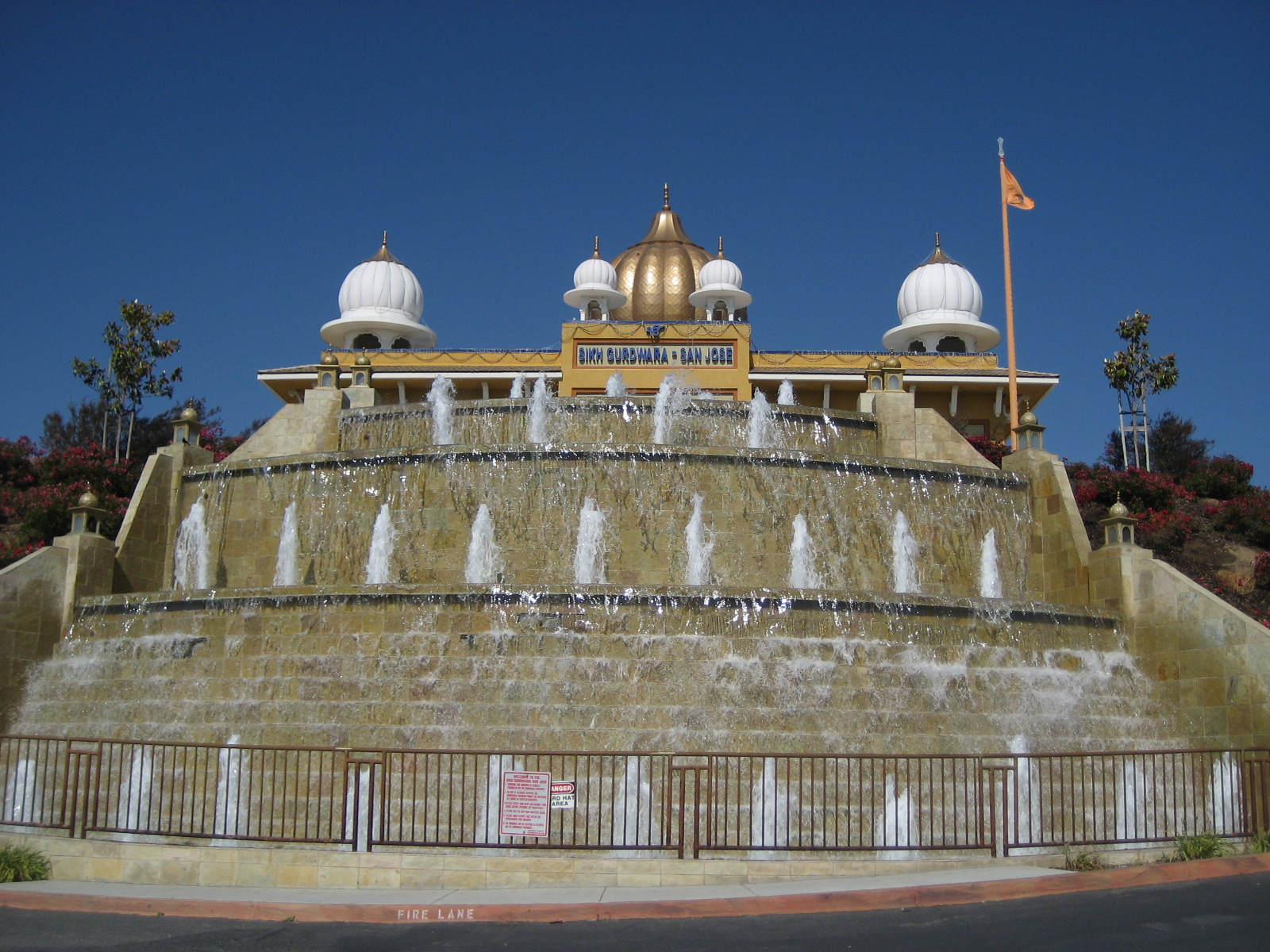
The gurdwara's cascade fountain.

Initially, the community met in a rented community center, but soon bought a small building in east San Jose. After buying nearby land in 1995, they decided it would be too expensive to build in the city limits, so they sold that land and bought a larger property further east. The first phase of the project of almost 20,000 square feet (1,900 m^{2}) was completed in 2004.

The second phase was completed in April 2011, making it the largest gurdwara in North America at 90,000 square feet (8,400 m^{2}). The chief architect and designer of the project is the late Malkiat Singh Sidhu. The largest audience at the San Jose Gurdwara was on opening day when some 20,000 people were thought to have come.

== Architecture ==
The gurdwara includes a prayer hall, called the "main Diwan Hall", that sees 10,000 in attendance every Sunday. It also includes a kitchen and accompanying hall to provide Langar service. Additionally, the grounds include a school wing that hosts about 700 students every Sunday for Punjabi, kirtan, and gurbani classes, basketball courts, and a free health clinic.

== See also ==
- Gurdwaras in the United States
