= East Bay Waldorf School =

Waldorf School in California, United States

Coordinates: 37°57′45″N 122°18′12″W

East Bay Waldorf School (EBWS) is an independent, non-sectarian Waldorf School in El Sobrante, California, on the east side of the San Francisco Bay. It is based on the principles of Waldorf education. Located on 91 acres of land, the school is adjacent to Wildcat Canyon, a regional park.

Founded in Berkeley in 1980, East Bay Waldorf School offers classes from prekindergarten through grade 8, as well as parent-child classes for infants-age 3 years. The curriculum is based upon the principles of Waldorf Education, and accredited by the Association of Waldorf Schools of North America (AWSNA).

== Campus ==
The East Bay Waldorf School's campus includes two large fields, an edible garden, eucalyptus and pine groves, several playgrounds designed to integrate play with nature, and farm animals. The outdoor space is augmented by Wildcat Canyon, a 2,427-acre regional park with hiking trails that lead directly from the school.

== Curriculum ==
The East Bay Waldorf School offers a balanced, comprehensive curriculum based on the principles of Waldorf Education, conceived by the Austrian educator, scientist and philosopher Rudolf Steiner during the 1920s. The Waldorf movement, represented by over 1000 schools worldwide, pioneered the education of the “whole child” introducing the “head, heart and hands” approach to learning.

Waldorf teachers integrate art, music and movement into every academic subject, which helps students better engage and absorb the academic material. Each year of the curriculum is designed to be developmentally-specific to the growing child.

During the kindergarten years, the focus is on creative play, being outdoors in nature, artistic work, storytelling, and meaningful practical work such as baking bread, sweeping, or woodworking. The teachers develop children's capacity for later academic learning by supporting this free, creative play, encouraging children's imaginative capacities, modeling behavior and creating a predictable environment of reverence and beauty.

In the elementary school grades, the day begins with a two-hour class known as “main lesson.” Devoted to a theme in language arts, math, science, or social studies, main lesson blocks last for 3–4 weeks. The latter part of the day is spent in “practical arts” such as handwork, music, Spanish or German language classes, physical education, Eurythmy (a form of movement), as well as language arts and mathematics. Daily chores and significant outdoor time are also essential to the Waldorf approach.

Assessment is formative (careful observation with an ongoing qualitative focus on what needs to be developed), rather than summative (typically grades and testing), and teachers stay with the same class for several years, up to an eight-year period.

Waldorf education emphasizes moral qualities such as beauty, truth, and inherent goodness. Teachers strive to surround the children with these elements through aesthetically-pleasing classrooms, meaningful activity, and the content of the curriculum. For example, history is taught through legends and biographies that illuminate human strength and heroism in the face of adversity.

The use of television, computers and hand-held devices is discouraged for elementary school students at the East Bay Waldorf School. Electronic media is viewed as detrimental to the healthy development of children, and to the cultivation of creativity, perseverance and problem-solving. The East Bay Waldorf School considers education to be much more than acquiring information and skills; therefore learning is a human-to-human endeavor that electronic devices do not support.

== Events ==
The East Bay Waldorf School recognizes the cycles of the year by celebrating a variety of seasonal festivals and events, including Michaelmas, Harvest Faire, Wanderer's Way, the Spiral of Light, and the May Faire. Several of these events are open to the public.
