= Gurdwara Sahib of Fremont =

Coordinates: 37.583510°N 121.99839°W

The Gurdwara Sahib of Fremont (also commonly referred to as the Fremont Gurdwara or the Sikh Temple of Fremont) is a center of Sikh worship. Although it is located in Fremont, a city in southern Alameda County, it serves the greater San Francisco Bay Area consisting of the counties of Alameda, Santa Clara, San Mateo, San Francisco, Contra Costa, Marin and Solano. Officially, the Gurdwara's Supreme Council extends registered membership to all those who live in the Bay Area, as well as locations in the Central Valley such as San Joaquin and Stanislaus Counties. The Gurdwara is also one of the most influential in the entire world, garnering an income of over a million dollars every single year. SAT classes for High School Kids and Gurmat Camp is held in the Summer.

== See also ==
- Gurdwaras in the United States
