= California and Nevada Railroad =

Defunct railroad in California, US

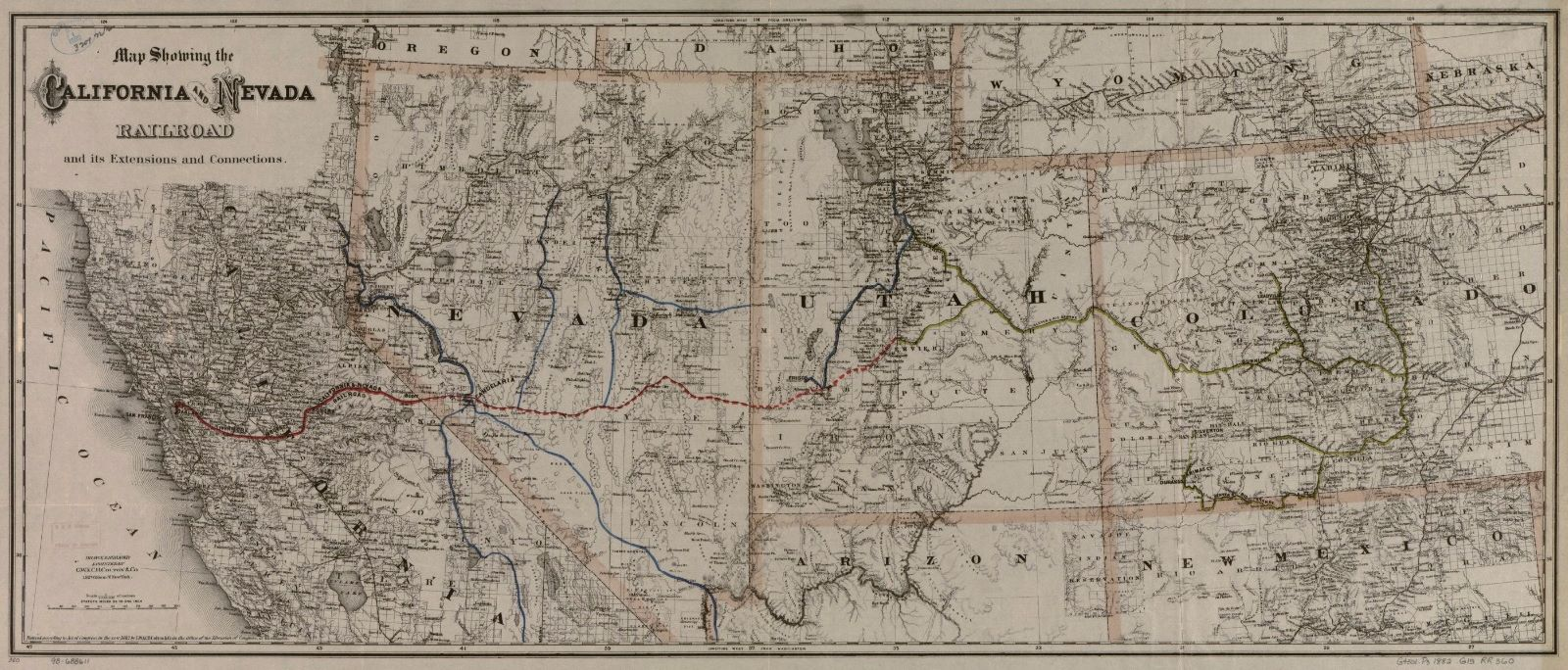
- The planned railroad, and its extensions and connections, 1882. Only the western 22 miles were actually built.

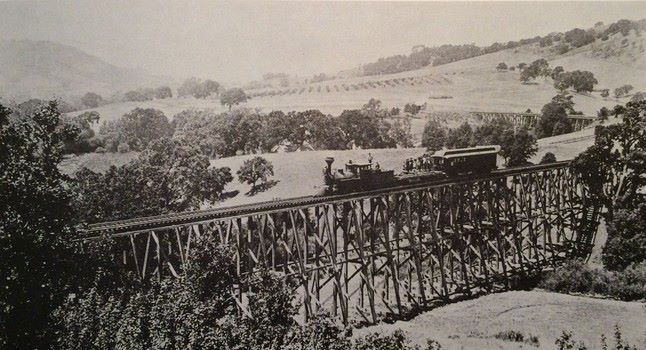
- Trestle bridge of California and Nevada Railroad in Orinda

Overview
- Headquarters: 40th Street/San Pablo Avenue, Oakland, California
- Locale: East Bay, California
- Dates of operation: 1884–1903

Technical
- Track gauge: 3 ft (914 mm)

The California and Nevada Railroad was a 3 ft (914 mm) narrow gauge steam railroad which ran in the East Bay of the San Francisco Bay Area in the late 19th century. It was incorporated on March 25, 1884. J.S. Emery was listed as the railroad's president - the present day city of Emeryville is named after him. On March 1, 1885, the track was completed between Oakland and San Pablo via Emeryville. The track to Oak Grove (present day El Sobrante) was completed on January 1, 1887.

== California & Mt. Diablo Railroad ==
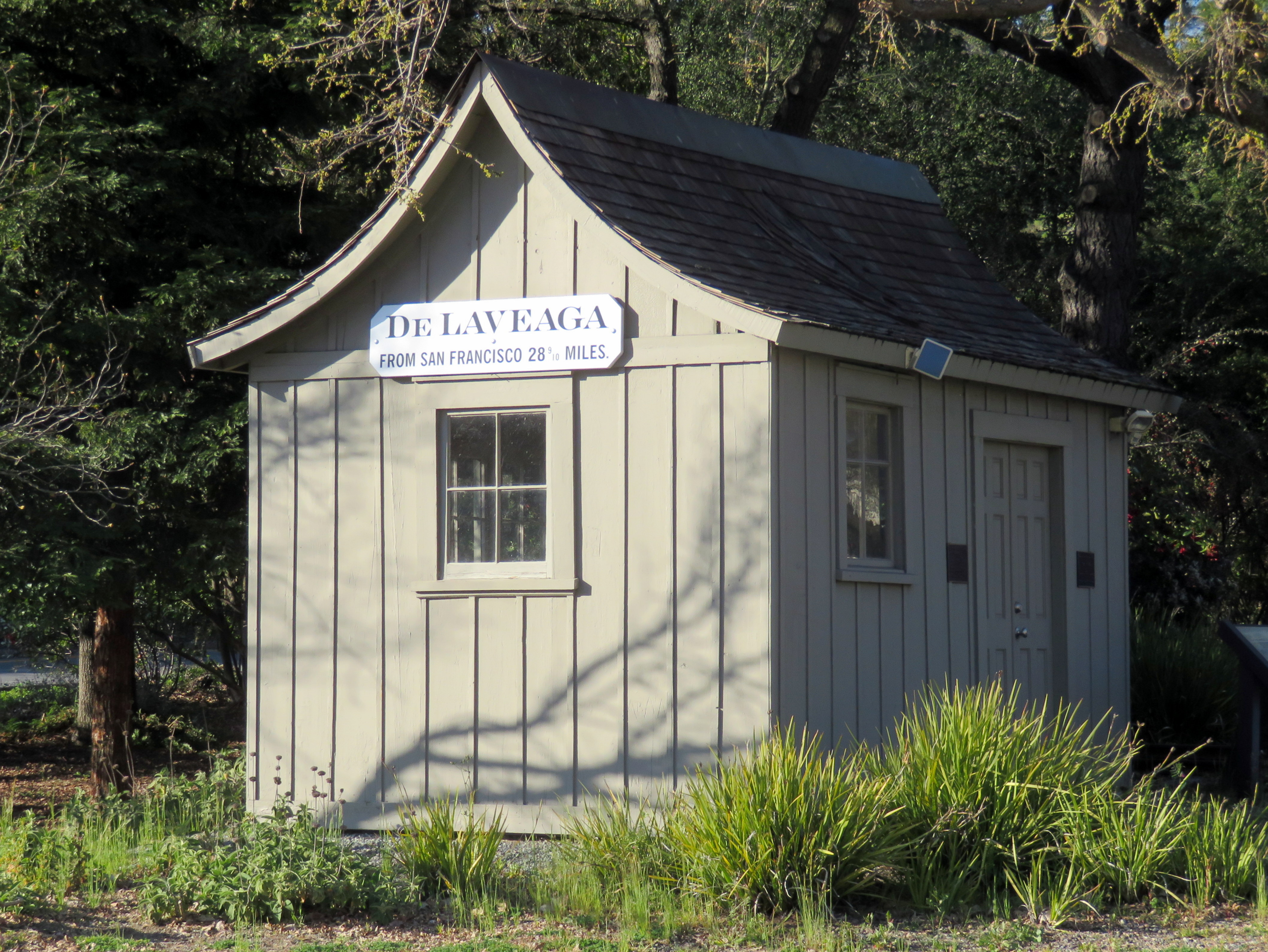
DeLaveaga station, the sole extant C&N station, is preserved in downtown Orinda

The first 10 miles (16 km) of the California & Nevada was built by its predecessor, the California & Mt. Diablo Railroad. The California & Mt. Diablo Railroad was organized on March 21, 1881, at Emery's, an unincorporated settlement which later became the city of Emeryville. The 3 ft (914 mm) narrow gauge track commenced at 40th Street/San Pablo Avenue and continued 9.85 miles (15.85 km) north through present day Berkeley, Albany, El Cerrito and terminated in Richmond.

The California & Mt. Diablo Railroad proposed to run from a pier on San Francisco Bay in Emeryville, then across central California and across the Sierra Nevada mountains at Sonora Pass near Bodie, California, and then east to a connection with the Denver and Rio Grande Railroad in Utah. The California and Mt. Diablo was sold to the California and Nevada.

The California and Nevada reached San Pablo, California, in 1886. It was subsequently extended around the northern end of the Berkeley Hills and the San Pablo Ridge, then southeastward down the valley drained by San Pablo Creek to Orinda, running along what is now the eastern shoreline of San Pablo Reservoir. A shortage of capital and constant problems with washed-out tracks barred further extensions. For most of its duration, the railroad was primarily run for weekend excursions. The railroad reached Orinda (then called "Bryants"), its furthest extent, in November 1891. At this point, it owned and operated 22 miles (35 km) of track.

On May 29, 1896, and again on July 12, 1899, the railroad was placed into receivership. After 1900 the railroad ceased to operate. The railroad was sold at foreclosure on November 29, 1902.

== Oakland & East Side Railroad ==
The nascent pier into San Francisco Bay was acquired by "Borax" Smith who used it as the basis for construction of his massive interurban Key System causeway and ferry pier.

On March 7, 1903, the Oakland and East Side Railroad acquired the right-of-way of the California and Nevada on behalf of its parent company, the Atchison, Topeka and Santa Fe Railway (see "paper railroad"). Santa Fe wanted the California & Nevada to gain access to Oakland from the Santa Fe's terminal at Richmond, California. The track beyond Richmond (from a point just north of today's El Cerrito Del Norte BART Station) to Orinda was abandoned. In 1903, Santa Fe converted the narrow gauge to standard track gauge between Richmond and Oakland. Upon completion of the standardization, on May 16, 1904, the Oakland and East Side Railroad was leased to the Santa Fe. That same day, the first Santa Fe train passed over the line.

== Route ==
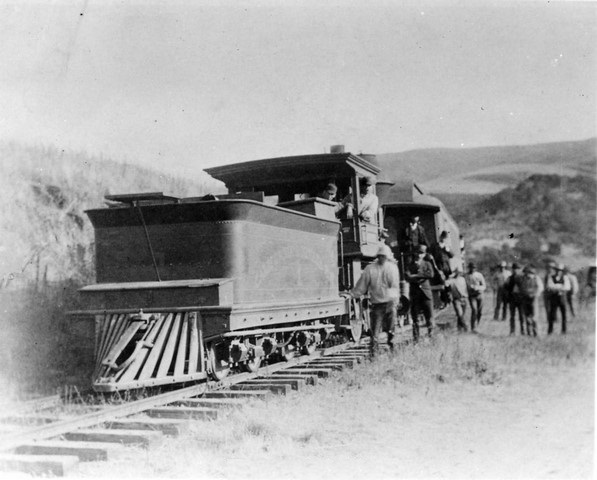
Clancy's Cut

- Oakland
- Emerys (Emeryville)
- Berkeley
- Albany
- El Cerrito
- Richmond
- San Pablo
- Oak Grove (El Sobrante)
- Fargos
- Orinda Park
- Bryant

== The right-of-way today ==
The track from San Pablo to Orinda follows much of the route of the San Pablo Dam Road through El Sobrante. The Santa Fe line between Richmond and Oakland was abandoned by the Santa Fe in the early 1980s when the Santa Fe obtained trackage rights into Oakland via Southern Pacific Railroad's parallel line to the west – it was subsequently converted into the Richmond Greenway.

Today, the Ohlone Greenway runs along the original California & Nevada right-of-way between El Cerrito Del Norte Station and Albany. A bicycle path follows the course of the tracks while a BART aerial line runs along the western edge, within the old right-of way. In fact, for a few years, BART and Santa Fe trains ran simultaneously there.

== See also ==
- Rail trail

== Sources ==
- Hanson, Erle C. (1994). The True Story of the California and Nevada Railroad: Narrow Gauge in the East Bay. Golden, Colorado: Colorado Rail Museum. ISBN 99954-39-81-6.
- Robertson, Donald B. (1998). Encyclopedia of Western Railroad History. Vol. IV. Caldwell, ID: Caxton Printers. p. 173. ISBN 0-87004-385-4. OCLC 13456066. OL 2716499M.
