= Gurdwara Sahib of Santa Rosa =

Coordinates: 38°23′7″N 122°45′42″W

The Gurdwara Sahib of Santa Rosa (also commonly referred to as the Santa Rosa Gurdwara, the Sikh Temple of Santa Rosa, or the North Bay Sikh Foundation) is a center of Sikh worship.

== History ==
The temple was founded in 2002, and according to a 2012 Press Democrat article, has about 100 members. It is a converted modular home located off Todd Road, in a ranching area.

== See also ==
- Gurdwaras in the United States
