= Gurdwara Sahib of Yuba City =

Coordinates: 39.1624°N 121.6627°W

The Sikh Temple of Yuba City in Yuba City, California was opened in 1970 and serves over 20,000 Sikhs in the area, which is home to many Sikhs and Punjabis. The Gurdwara has a main Langar hall and prayer hall. The temple led to a "renaissance of the Sikh community in Yuba City," including the 1980 establishment of the local Sikh parade, which has become one of the largest Sikh festivals outside India.

== See also ==
- Gurdwaras in the United States

== Sources ==
- Official Temple website
