= Sikh Gurdwara of Eugene =

Coordinates: 44°1′0.0″N 123°4′53.9″W

Regions with significant populations
- Eugene, Oregon, U.S.

Religion
- Sikhism

The Sikh Gurdwara of Eugene, also known as Guru Ram Das Gurdwara, is a Sikh ashram community in Eugene, Oregon founded in 1970 by Yogi Bhajan sent Sat Kirpal Singh.

== History ==
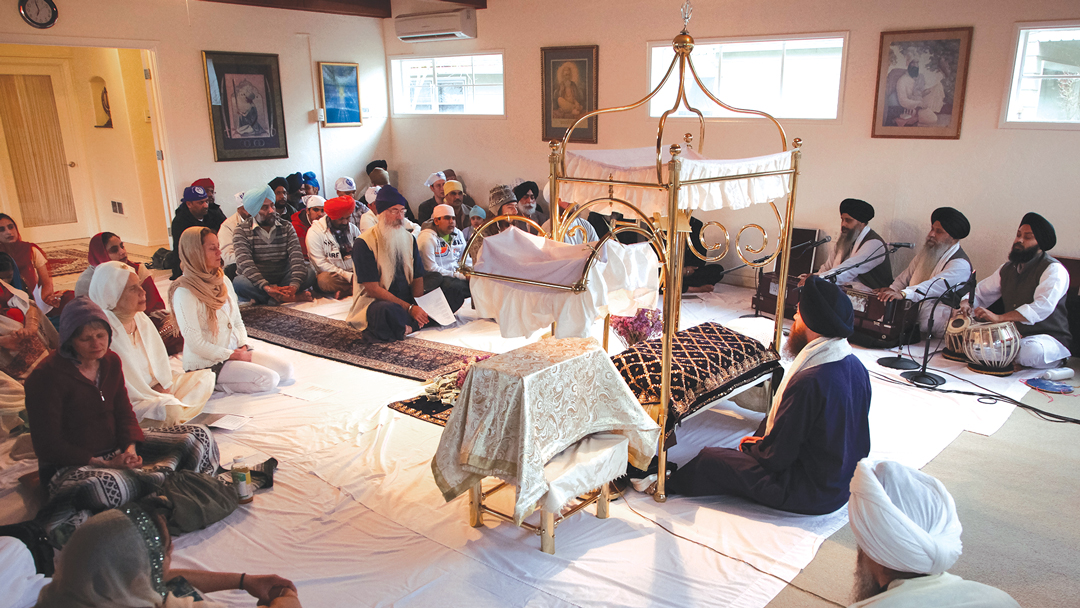
Members of the Sikh Gurdwara of Eugene Practicing their religion

Yogi Bhajan, a frequent visitor Eugene, founded the gurdwara in 1970. After the events of 11 September 2001, some members started the Interfaith Prayer Service International, a religious interfaith non-profit group. It is the longest-running interfaith service in the United States.

The Sikh Gurdwara of Eugene was involved in a lawsuit with the Golden Temple company in 2009. The gurdwara also hosts breakfasts for homeless persons six times per year, and holds regular Kundalini Yoga classes taught by Yogi Bhajan, one of the first to publicly teach that form of yoga.

== See also ==
- Gurdwaras in the United States
