= Harpreet Sandhu (politician) =

Indian-born American politician and activist

Harpreet Singh Sandhu is an Indian-American politician and community activist from Richmond, California and one of the most prominent ones of the Sikh religion. He was the first Asian and the first Sikh city councilman in Richmond, and one of only a few Sikhs to hold office in the United States.

== Political career ==
Appointed to the council in January, 2007, he filled a vacancy left by Gayle McLaughlin when she became mayor from the city's Human Rights Commission. He received five votes with three abstentions. He began his single term with his swearing in on January 16, 2007. Sandhu was one of a very few Sikh officeholders in the United States and the only one in California during his term.

In 2008 he ran unsuccessfully for a full term. He was endorsed by Jerry Brown and ran on an anti-crime, pro-municipal services platform. He came in seventh in a contest for three available seats. Sandhu had voted along with the "Viramontes five" in July 2008 to expand the operational capacity of the Chevron Richmond Refinery, which was opposed by the more liberal bloc that took a majority of the council in the 2008 election.

Harpreet Singh Sandhu was elected to represent Congressional District 7 as a Barack Obama delegate to the 2008 Democratic National Convention in Denver. He was also invited to the White House's first-ever celebration of Guru Nanak as a prominent member of the Sikh community.

He is a former president of the Sikh Center of San Francisco Bay Area, one of the largest Sikh places of worship in America. He served on the human relations and human rights commission. Sandhu is a longtime advocate for the safety of taxi drivers who have often been the victims of crime, both for opportunity and alleged hate.

Harpreet S. Sandhu had a major role in forming the American Sikh Congressional Caucus, which is a bipartisan group of lawmakers to address Sikh American issues.

=== 2008 election results ===
1st	2nd	3rd	4th	5th	6th	7th	8th	9th	10th
Jeff Ritterman	Nat Bates (incumbent)	Tom Butt (incumbent)	Jovanka Beckles	John Márquez (incumbent)	Corky Boozé	Harpreet Singh Sandhu (incumbent)	Rock Brown	Chris Tallerico	Navdeep Garcha
DEM	DEM	DEM	DEM	DEM	DEM	DEM	DEM	DEM	DEM
9,987	9,556	9,428	9,002	7,929	6,138	4,665	2,156	1,491	1,243
Win	Win	Win	Loss	Loss	Loss	Loss	Loss	Loss	Loss

== Personal life ==
Harpreet Singh Sandhu is an immigrant from India. He is married to Interpreet Sandhu; they have three children. He attended San Francisco State University. He worked as a postal worker for more than 20 years.
