= Sikh Religious Society of South Carolina =

Coordinates: 34.1611°N 81.2589°W

Sikh Religious Society of South Carolina is a Sikh gurdwara, also known as Gurdwara Nanaksar, located in Chapin, South Carolina.

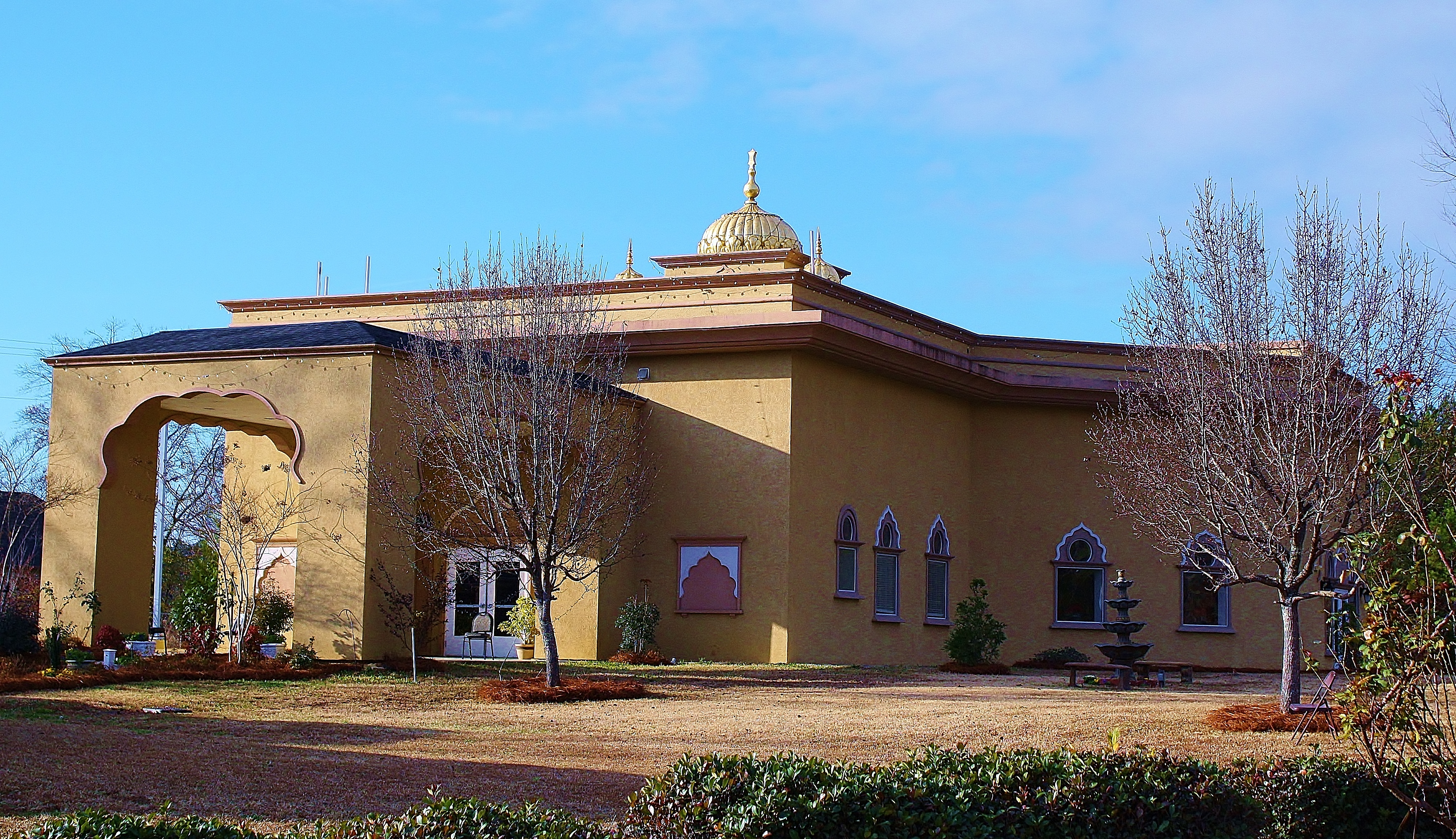
Gurdwara Nanaksar, Sikh Religious Society of South Carolina, New Gurdwara Sahib building inaugurated in June 2013

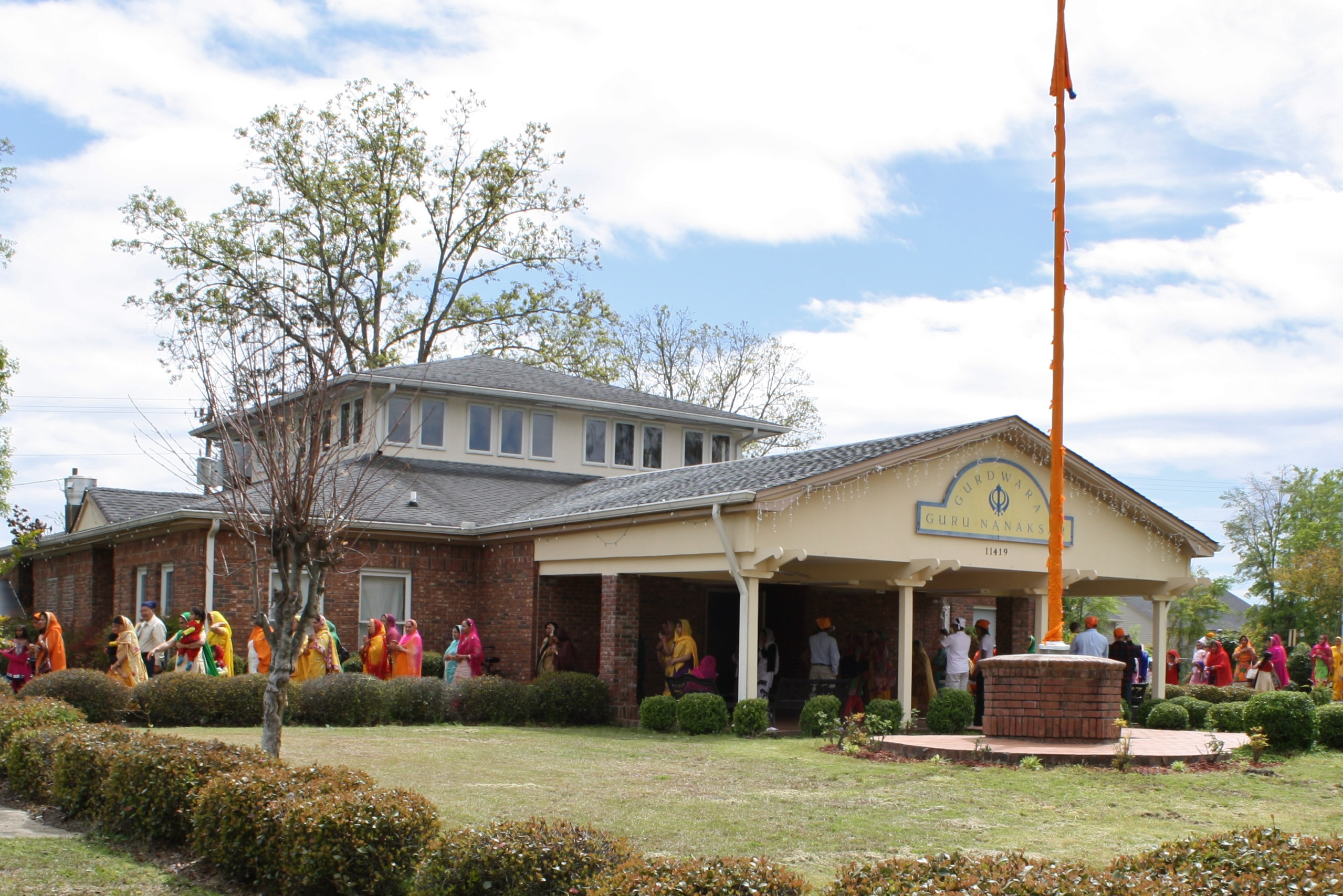
Langar Hall, Sikh Religious Society of South Carolina, Old Gurdwara Sahib building opened in 1995. Now Langar hall after opening of new Gurdwara Sahib building in June 2013

== History ==
The Sikh community did not have a Gurdwara in South Carolina during the 1970s. Religious services were held in the homes of sponsoring families. For Gurpurb and community events, devotees went to Gurdwaras in Georgia and North Carolina to perform ceremonies or attend Gurpurb.

Professionals and businessmen in the community were inspired to plan a Gurdwara and engage community leaders in 1990. Architect Rene Mangat provided architectural plans for the first 60’ X 60’ building as sewa. This triggered the donation drive, putting more energy in the project.

The Executive Committee represented Upstate, Midlands and the Low Country in SC. A constitution was developed and the Sikh Religious Society of South Carolina was established and registered with the Secretary of State as a tax exempt Religious institution. This tract of 3.64 acres was donated by a devotee. The site is considered as central location for access from all parts of the state.

The first building was designed for a small community and was completed in 1995. It served for both the religious services and as a langar hall.

== New Prayer Hall ==
As congregation was increasing, Community decided to work on a bigger prayer hall and to use first building as dining hall. A fund drive was initiated to apply for the bank loan. Architect Abhay Pradhan of North Carolina graciously donated architectural plans for the new 7000 square feet building. Half of the total cost of new building was raised by the community of South Carolina.

New prayer hall building was inaugurated on June 15, 2013 by the South Carolina Governor Nikki Haley. The Consul General of India Atlanta Mr.Ajit Kumar and Sikh community of Georgia, North Carolina and South Carolina graced the occasion.
