= Gurdwara Sahib of El Sobrante =

Coordinates: 37.9597°N 122.3168°W

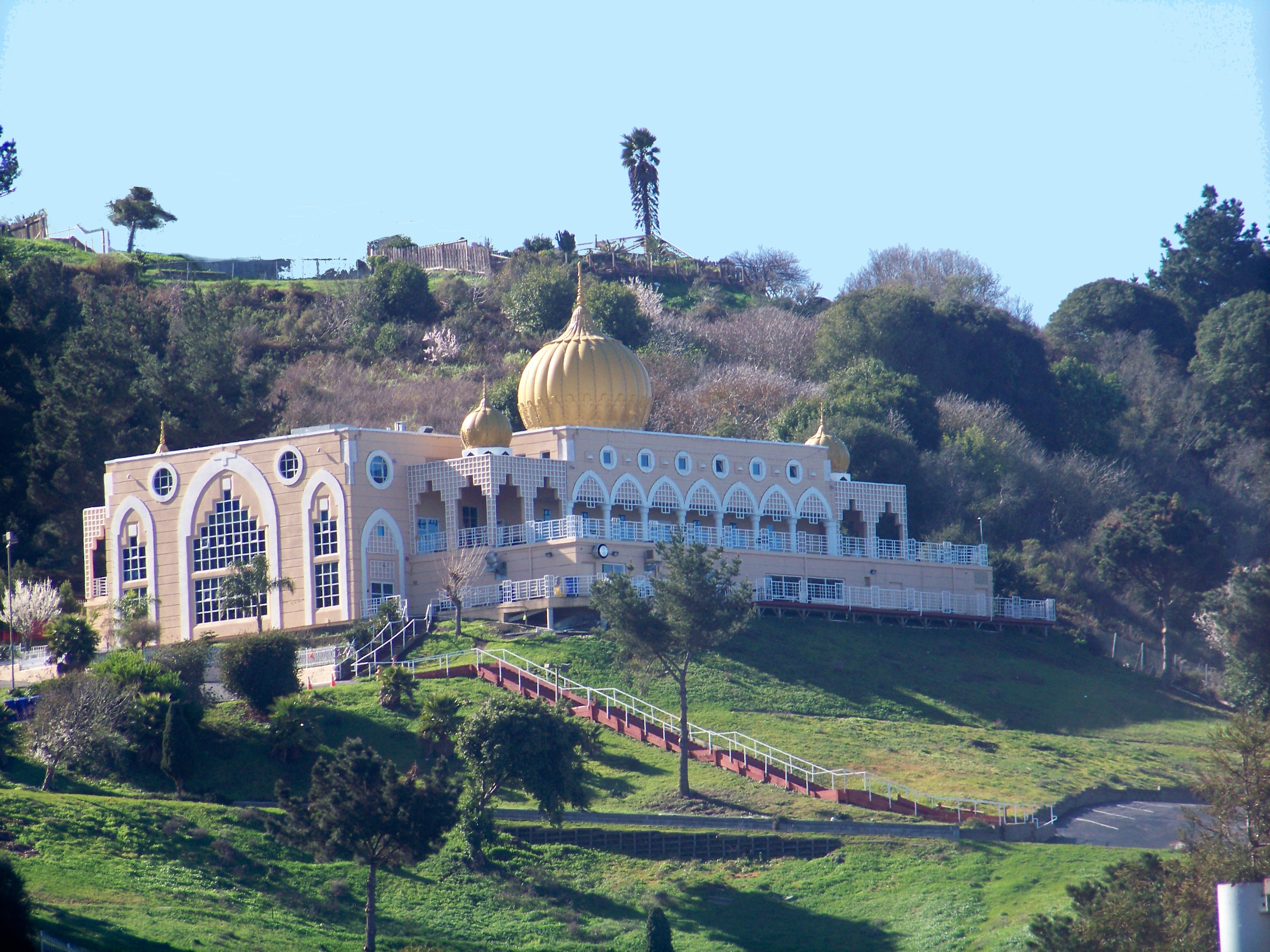
View of the Sikh Center of San Francisco Bay Area

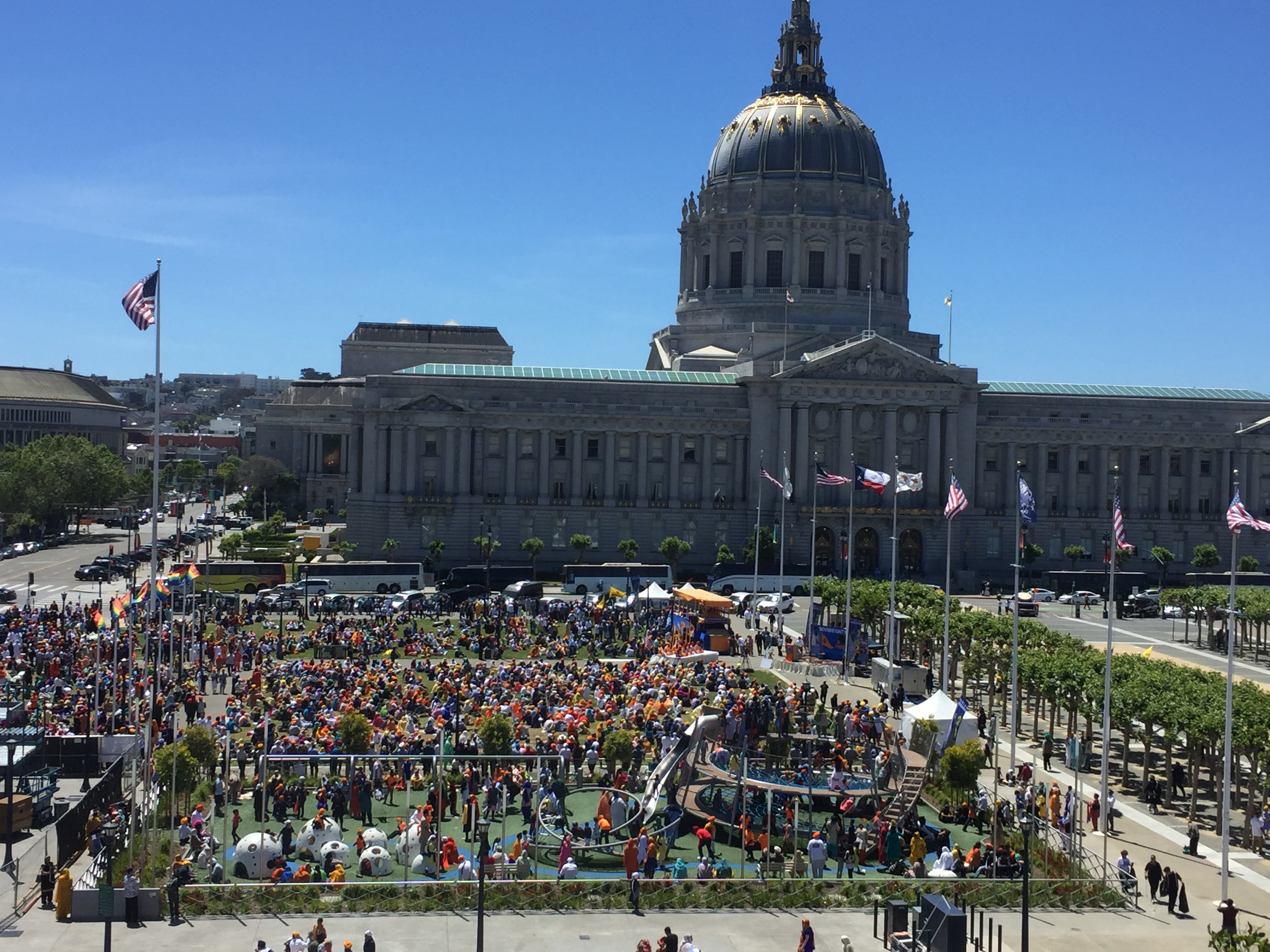
Sikh Festival and Parade, San Francisco Civic Center June 10, 2018

The Sikh Center of the San Francisco Bay Area (also known as Gurdwara Sahib of El Sobrante) is a Sikh gurdwara in the hills of unincorporated El Sobrante, California, in the East Bay of the San Francisco Bay Area.

== Overview ==
The Center was established in May 1979.

The Center features large golden domes atop a pink-cream-beige tiled box arched structure. Regular services are held every Wednesday evening and Sunday morning. The site is open to drop-in visitors from 5:00 a.m. to 8:30 p.m. Langar, which is a Punjabi term that means collective eating while sitting on the floor, is given daily, free of cost, to all visitors, Sikh or non-Sikh. Visitors must cover their hair, be sober, have no drugs, alcohol, or tobacco products in their possession, and must enter barefoot after washing their feet.

== Shooting incidents ==
In 1985, a man was shot after removing another worshipper's turban.

On January 23, 2000, a gunman, Joga Singh Sandher, opened fire with an assault weapon on temple leader, local teacher, and human rights activist Ajmer Singh Malhi, killing him and seriously injuring another worshipper before being subdued by bystanders.

On September 24, 2001, Sandher was found guilty of 1st degree murder by judge Richard Flier. On the morning of November 9, he was sentenced to 50 years to life in prison. On September 22, 2022, he was denied parole due to public safety concerns, and will have to wait 10 years before being considered for early release again.

== Summer camps ==
The Center offers summer camps for K–12 students to teach them more about Sikhism and its history and to create a community. The summer camps typically follow the structure of a conventional primary school day, with different subjects (such as history and music), time to eat, and time for recreational activities.

== See also ==
- Gurdwaras in the United States
