= National Gurdwara =

Sikh gurdwara in Washington, District of Columbia

Coordinates: 38.9302°N 77.0748°W

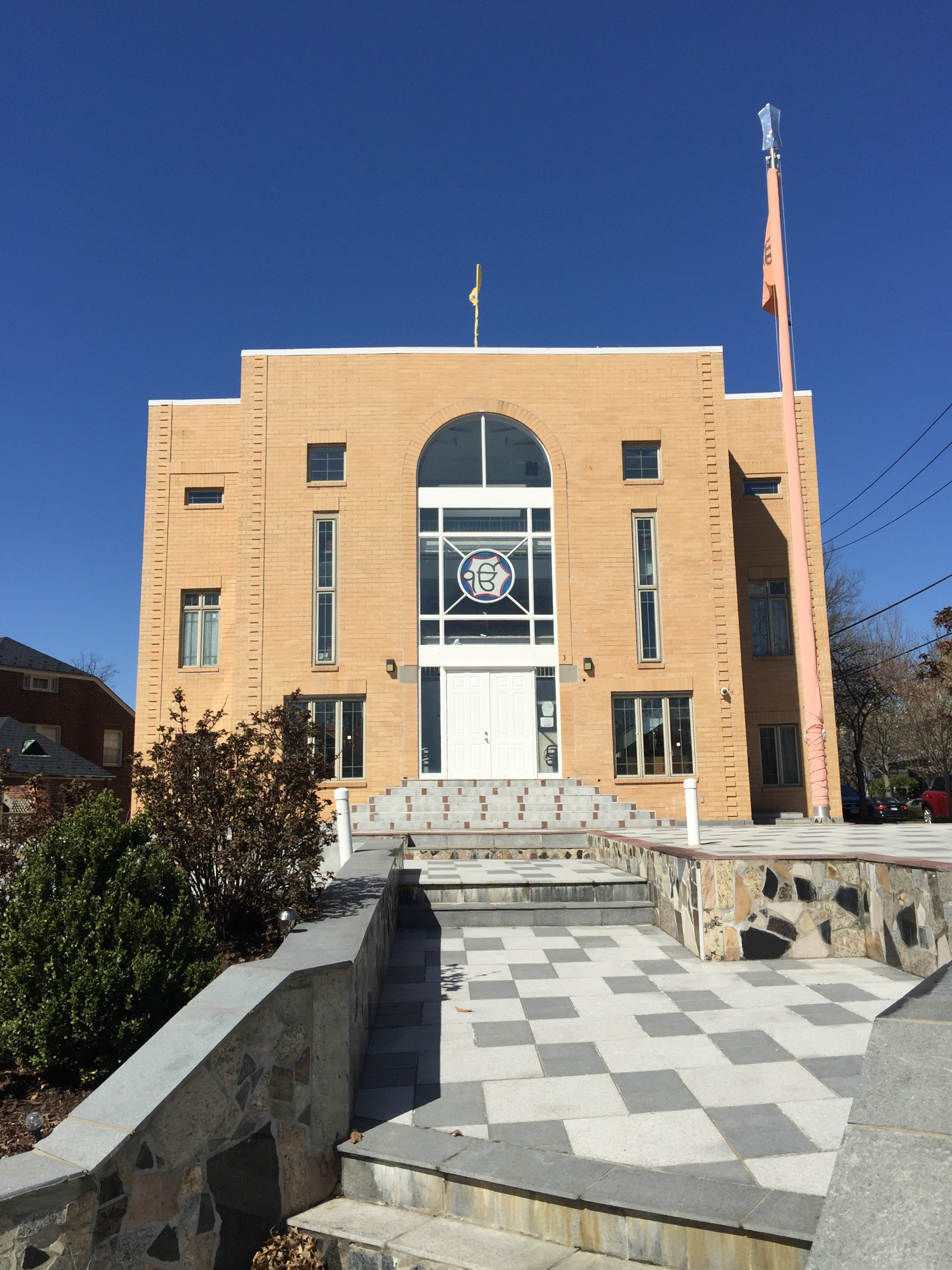
The National Gurdwara in Washington.

The National Gurdwara is a Sikh gurdwara located in Washington, D.C.

Located on Massachusetts Avenue, the National Gurdwara is the first and only Sikh institution in the capital of the United States. It is located near the National Cathedral, Naval Observatory and American University. The gurdwara officially opened in February 2006, and cost over 2 million US dollars. Along with religious services, Punjabi language classes and kirtan classes are held.
