= San Pablo Dam Road =

Major arterial road in California

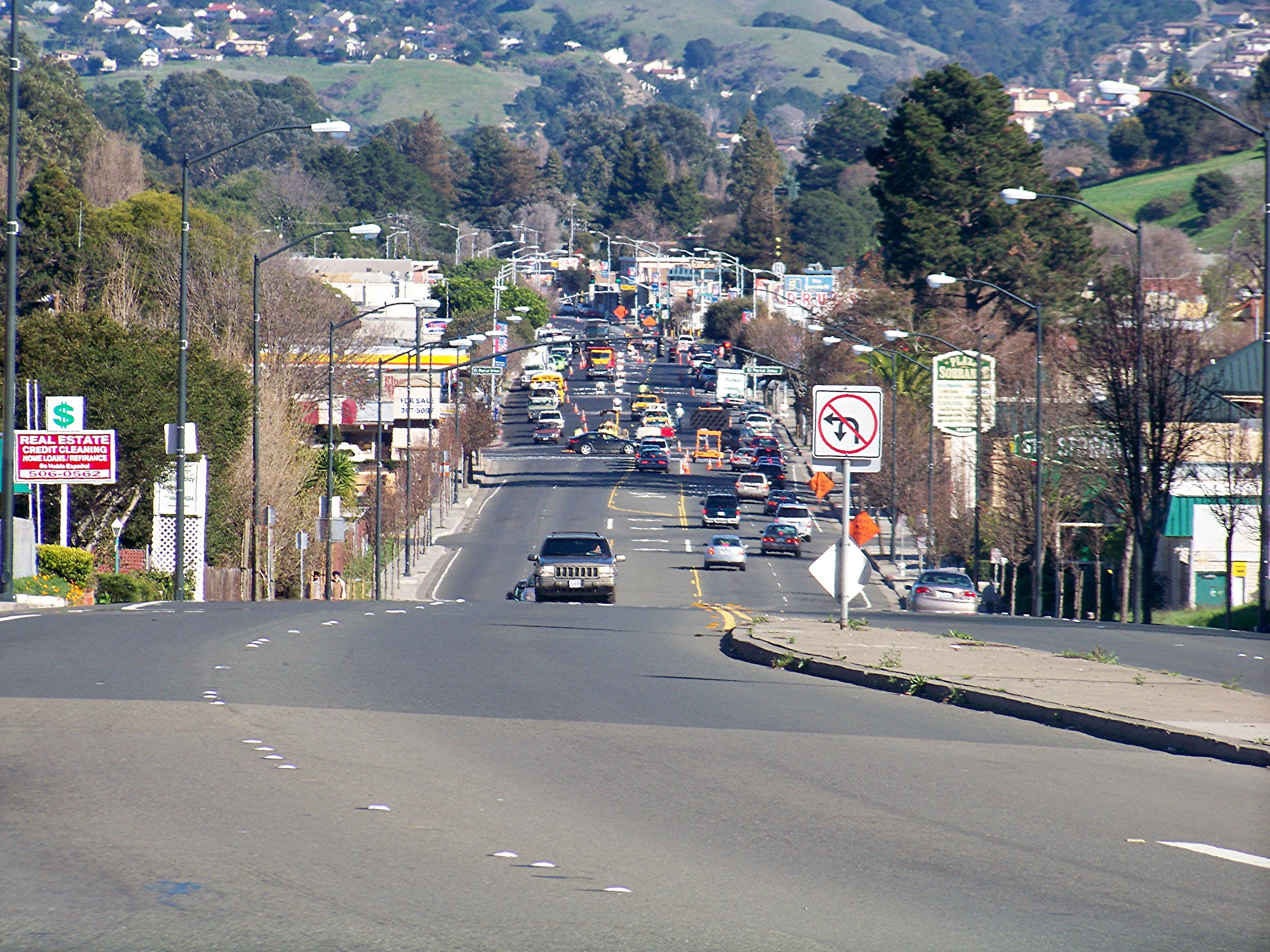
- Eastbound San Pablo Dam Road in El Sobrante, California
- Maintained by: Contra Costa County, California
- Length: 11.9 mi (19.2 km)
- Northwest end: San Pablo Avenue in San Pablo
- Major junctions: I-80 (Eastshore Freeway) in San Pablo; SR 24 in Orinda
- Southeast end: Moraga Way in Orinda

San Pablo Dam Road is a major arterial road linking San Pablo and Orinda, California in the United States, which connects San Pablo Avenue and Interstate 80 with Highway 24, bypassing the Eastshore Freeway. It is also signed as Camino Pablo in Orinda.

The road passes through the communities of El Sobrante and Richmond. It begins at San Pablo Avenue and ends south of Highway 24 in Orinda, where it merges with Moraga Way en route to Moraga. The roadway travels along the San Pablo Canyon and San Pablo Reservoir along the former rail right-of-way of the California and Nevada Railroad. It passes by Kennedy Grove Regional Recreation Area. It has two lanes for the majority of its length but increases to 4 lanes when traveling through urban areas.
