= Sikh Religious Society of Chicago =

Gurdwara Palatine Sikh Religious Society (SRS), based in Palatine, Illinois, is a United States-based Not-for-Profit Religious Organization and a place of worship, incorporated in 1972. It manages the largest Gurdwaara Sahib (Sikh Worship Center) of Midwest America at 1280 Winnetka Street, Palatine on a Campus spread over fourteen acres of land at a prime location in Chicago's metropolitan area. In a seven-day-a-week religious program, devotees visit the Gurdwaara Sahib to make prayers, listen to the Sikh hymns (Kirtan), and discourses on Spirituality.

In September 2010, the Sikh Religious Society of Chicago attracted public controversy when unveiling their plans to build a 40-foot dome. After feedback from the neighboring residents, the Gurdwaara management decided to lower the height of the dome. The Mool Nanakshahi Calendar Implementation Conference in 2017 was hosted by the SRS which attracted speakers and hundreds of attendees from various parts of the world including the United States, India, Australia and Canada.

The SRS has been an active participant in serving the local communities. In 2019, the society was honored with Lifetime Achievement Award by the Salvation Army, Metropolitan Division for its service and generosity since 1992.

== Aims and objectives ==
The Sikh Religious Society aims:

1. To promote interest in and disseminate information on Sikhism.
2. To organize and simulate programs towards establishing Gurdwaras
3. To organize discourses on Gurbani, Sikh history and Culture and Strive for establishment of a Central Institute of Sikh Studies in USA.
4. To organize libraries and establish a periodical.
5. To encourage social and cultural gatherings in order to celebrate Sikh occasions.
6. To organize affiliated local units all over USA.
7. To organize programs of religious education for the Sikh community.
8. To promote interfaith activities.

== Granthi Sahibs ==
Bhai Lakhwinder Singh Luknow Wale is the current Granthi for the Sikh Religious Society of Chicago.

Society has two Kirtani Jathas: 1. Bhai Aaswinder Singh Ji Hazoori Ragi Darbar Sahib, Amritsar Bhai Satvir Singh Ji Tabla Vadak also from Darbar Sahib, Amritsar and Bhai Arshdeep Singh Ji Jawaddi Taksal. 2. Bhai Anmol Singh Ji ratan Shri Ganga Nagar Wale, Bhai Veer Singh Ji from Hazoor Sahib Nanded and Bhai Milap Singh Ji Shri Ganga Nagar Wale.
