= El Sobrante, Contra Costa County, California =

Census-designated place in United States

El Sobrante
- Census-designated place
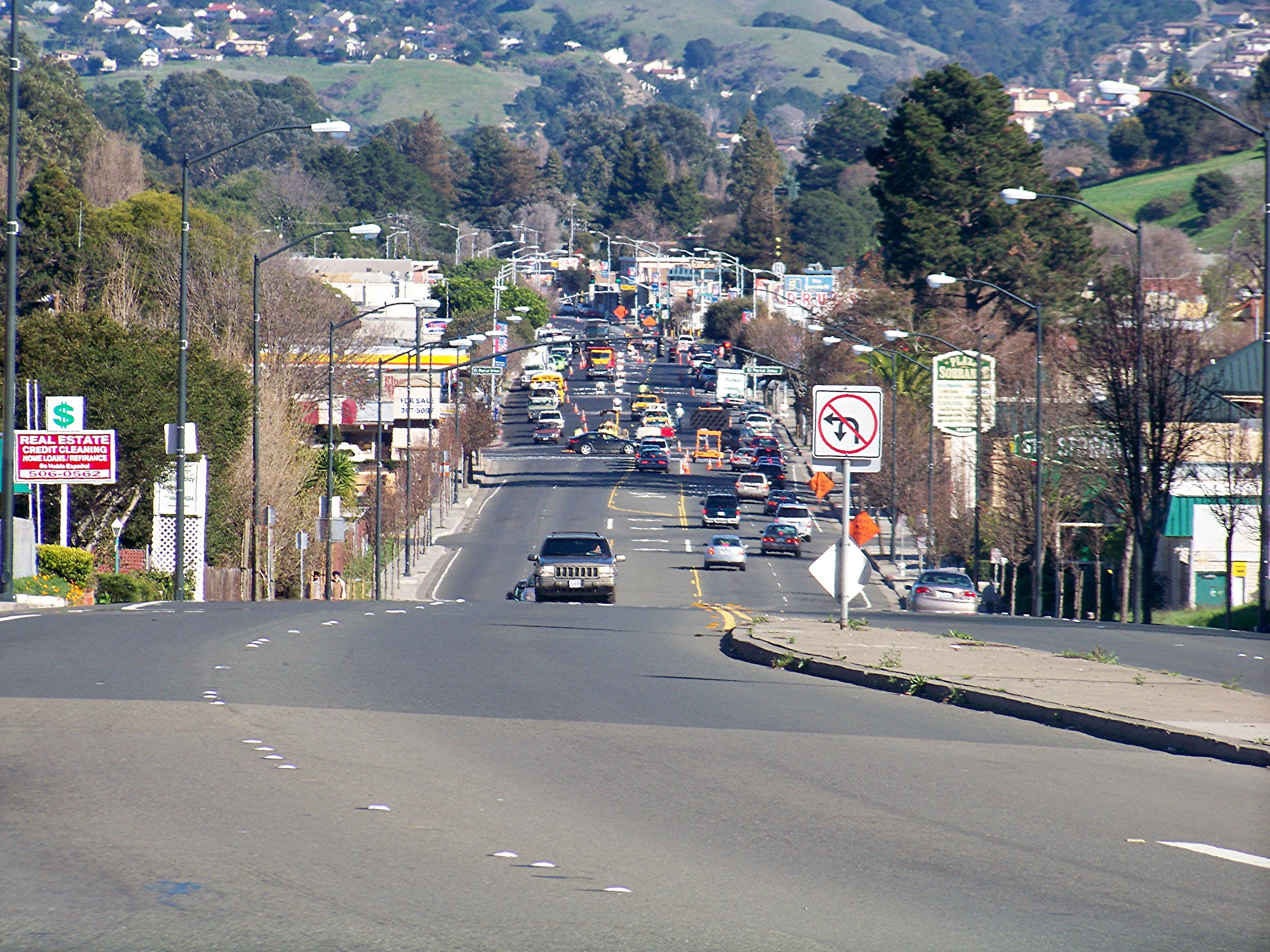
- San Pablo Dam Road, looking eastward through El Sobrante
- Interactive map of El Sobrante
- Location in the United States El Sobrante (the United States)
- Coordinates: 37°58′38″N 122°17′43″W
- Country: United States
- State: California
- County: Contra Costa

Government
  - State Senate: Jesse Arreguín (D)
  - State Assembly: Buffy Wicks (D)
  - U. S. Congress: John Garamendi (D)

Area
  - Total: 3.096 sq mi (8.02 km^{2})
  - Land: 3.096 sq mi (8.02 km^{2})
  - Water: 0 sq mi (0 km^{2}) 0%
- Elevation: 187 ft (57 m)

Population (2020)
  - Total: 15,524
  - Density: 5,014/sq mi (1,936/km^{2})
- Time zone: UTC-8 (PST)
  - Summer (DST): UTC-7 (PDT)
- ZIP codes: 94803, 94820
- Area codes: 510, 341
- FIPS code: 06-22454
- GNIS feature IDs: 1658484, 2408062

El Sobrante (pronounced [el soˈβɾante]; Spanish for 'The Surplus') is a census-designated place (CDP) in Contra Costa County, California, United States. The population was 15,524 at the 2020 census.

== Geography ==
According to the United States Census Bureau, the CDP has a total area of 3.1 square miles (8 km^{2}), all land.

El Sobrante is unincorporated and lies within Contra Costa County. Main roads include San Pablo Dam Road (a major road running from Richmond and San Pablo, through El Sobrante, past EBMUD's San Pablo Reservoir), Valley View Road and Appian Way. San Pablo Dam Road and Appian Way both connect to Interstate 80 to the west.

El Sobrante also contains the San Pablo Creek, which runs adjacent to San Pablo Dam road, and adjacent to the El Sobrante - Contra Costa County Library.

== History ==
Between 5000 and 1000 BC, an indigenous tribe of people called the Huchiun (alternate spellings: Huichin, Xučyun), an Ohlone people, came to the East Bay, including El Sobrante. One of the Huchiun villages was located where the El Sobrante Library now stands. The Huchiun left a now-buried shell mound beside San Pablo Creek. Ohlone people still live in the bay area and other parts of the world today.

Between November 1794 and May 1795, the Huchiun were forcibly converted to Christianity by Spanish missionaries. After all of the Huchiun were removed to Mission San Francisco, they suffered an epidemic of European diseases as well as food shortages, and died in great numbers, resulting in alarming statistics of death and escapes from the missions. In pursuing the runaways, the Franciscans sent neophytes first and (as a last resort) soldiers to go round up the runaway "Christians" from their relatives, and bring them back to the missions. Thus illness spread both inside and outside of the missions.

After Mexican independence from Spain in the early 19th century, Spanish colonists were given land grants, one of which was Rancho El Sobrante, deeded to Juan Jose and Víctor Castro in 1841. The grant's boundaries were unusually complicated, as they were to be determined by the boundaries of the surrounding grants: San Antonio, San Pablo, El Pinole, Boca de la Cañada del Pinole, Acalanes, and La Laguna de los Palos Colorados. In this sense, the rancho was el sobrante, the remaining area. Legal disputes concerning the borders and the claims of squatters continued for four decades, with much of the land sold to pay court and attorney costs. Victor Castro was left with 549 acres (2.22 km^{2}) of the original grant. He built an adobe dwelling in what is now El Cerrito, and became one of the first members of the Board of Supervisors of Contra Costa County. Castro died at the age of 90 in 1897. Some of his descendants still live in the area of Castro Ranch Road.

El Sobrante was called "Oak Grove" by industrial concerns in 1887 when the California and Nevada Railroad put a spur into the area for the purpose of carrying lumber cut from the hills. Then the name Sobrante was applied, with the addition of the Spanish definite article "El" coinciding with the opening of the first post office in 1941.

By the early 20th century, Rancho El Sobrante had been reduced to a number of smaller ranches, generally following a dirt road along San Pablo Creek. Many of these ranches were further subdivided. As roads were paved and homes were constructed, El Sobrante changed from a rural to a semi-rural community.

== Demographics ==
Historical population
| Census | Pop. | Note | %± |
|---|---|---|---|
| 1980 | 10,535 | | — |
| 1990 | 9,852 | | −6.5% |
| 2000 | 12,260 | | 24.4% |
| 2010 | 12,669 | | 3.3% |
| 2020 | 15,524 | | 22.5% |
U.S. Decennial Census; 1960 1970 1980; 1990 2000 2010

El Sobrante first appeared as a census-designated place in the 1980 United States census.

=== 2020 ===
El Sobrante CDP, Contra Costa County, California – Racial and ethnic composition Note: the US Census treats Hispanic/Latino as an ethnic category. This table excludes Latinos from the racial categories and assigns them to a separate category. Hispanics/Latinos may be of any race.
| Race / Ethnicity (NH = Non-Hispanic) | Pop 2000 | Pop 2010 | Pop 2020 | % 2000 | % 2010 | % 2020 |
|---|---|---|---|---|---|---|
| White alone (NH) | 6,616 | 5,214 | 4,871 | 53.96% | 41.16% | 31.38% |
| Black or African American alone (NH) | 1,473 | 1,614 | 1,766 | 12.01% | 12.74% | 11.38% |
| Native American or Alaska Native alone (NH) | 63 | 56 | 64 | 0.51% | 0.44% | 0.41% |
| Asian alone (NH) | 1,497 | 1,948 | 2,874 | 12.21% | 15.38% | 18.51% |
| Native Hawaiian or Pacific Islander alone (NH) | 33 | 110 | 94 | 0.27% | 0.87% | 0.61% |
| Other race alone (NH) | 70 | 69 | 208 | 0.57% | 0.54% | 1.34% |
| Mixed race or Multiracial (NH) | 598 | 622 | 1,001 | 4.88% | 4.91% | 6.45% |
| Hispanic or Latino (any race) | 1,910 | 3,036 | 4,646 | 15.58% | 23.96% | 29.93% |
| Total | 12,260 | 12,669 | 15,524 | 100.00% | 100.00% | 100.00% |

The 2020 United States Census reported that El Sobrante had a population of 15,524. The racial makeup of El Sobrante included 5,545 White residents, 2,603 from other races, 1,001 from two or more races, 2,874 Asians, 1,817 African Americans, 64 Native Americans, and 94 Pacific Islander. There were 4,646 residents of Hispanic or Latino ancestry.

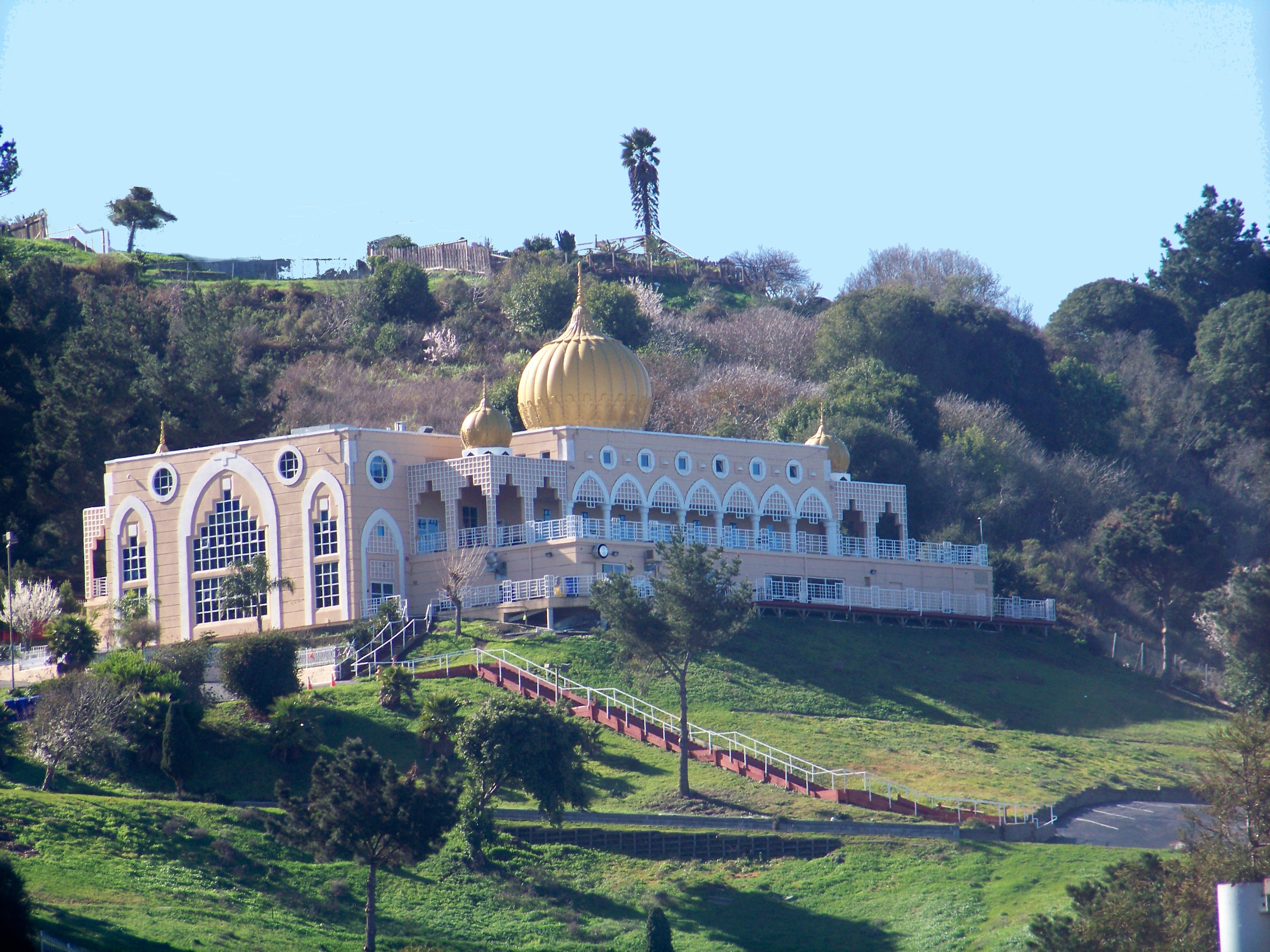
Gurdwara Sahib of El Sobrante

=== 2010 ===
The 2010 United States census reported that El Sobrante had a population of 12,669. The population density was 4,581.4 inhabitants per square mile (1,768.9/km^{2}). The racial makeup of El Sobrante was 6,405 (50.6%) White, 1,673 (13.2%) African American, 127 (1.0%) Native American, 1,986 (15.7%) Asian, 113 (0.9%) Pacific Islander, 1,384 (10.9%) from other races, and 981 (7.7%) from two or more races. There were 3,036 Hispanic or Latino residents, of any race (24.0%).

The Census reported that 12,620 people (99.6% of the population) lived in households, 49 (0.4%) lived in non-institutionalized group quarters, and 0 (0%) were institutionalized.

There were 4,759 households, out of which 1,600 (33.6%) had children under the age of 18 living in them, 2,154 (45.3%) were opposite-sex married couples living together, 757 (15.9%) had a female householder with no husband present, 301 (6.3%) had a male householder with no wife present. There were 312 (6.6%) unmarried opposite-sex partnerships, and 67 (1.4%) same-sex married couples or partnerships. 1,170 households (24.6%) were made up of individuals, and 373 (7.8%) had someone living alone who was 65 years of age or older. The average household size was 2.65. There were 3,212 families (67.5% of all households); the average family size was 3.16.

The population included 2,696 (21.3%) under the age of 18, 1,126 (8.9%) aged 18 to 24, 3,340 (26.4%) aged 25 to 44, 3,910 (30.9%) aged 45 to 64, and 1,597 people (12.6%) who were 65 years of age or older. The median age was 40.6 years. For every 100 females, there were 95.1 males. For every 100 females age 18 and over, there were 94.0 males.

There were 5,136 housing units at an average density of 1,857.3 per square mile (717.1/km^{2}), of which 4,759 were occupied, of which 2,952 (62.0%) were owner-occupied, and 1,807 (38.0%) were occupied by renters. The homeowner vacancy rate was 2.0%; the rental vacancy rate was 7.2%. 7,829 people (61.8% of the population) lived in owner-occupied housing units and 4,791 people (37.8%) lived in rental housing units.

=== 2000 ===
As of the 2000 census, there were 12,260 people, 4,676 households, and 3,170 families residing in the CDP. The population density was 3,953.1 inhabitants per square mile (1,526.3/km^{2}). There were 4,803 housing units at an average density of 1,548.7 per square mile (598.0/km^{2}). The racial makeup of the CDP was 60.35% White, 12.16% Black or African American, 0.67% Native American, 12.50% Asian, 0.29% Pacific Islander, 6.97% from other races, and 7.06% from two or more races. 15.58% of the population were Hispanic or Latino of any race.

There were 4,676 households, out of which 32.6% had children under the age of 18 living with them, 47.6% were married couples living together, 14.8% had a female householder with no husband present, and 32.2% were non-families. 24.6% of all households were made up of individuals, and 8.3% had someone living alone who was 65 years of age or older. The average household size was 2.61 and the average family size was 3.11.

In the CDP, 24.7% were under the age of 18, 7.3% from 18 to 24, 31.0% from 25 to 44, 25.2% from 45 to 64, and 11.8% were 65 years of age or older. The median age was 38 years. For every 100 females, there were 94.1 males. For every 100 females age 18 and over, there were 92.2 males.

The median income for a household in the CDP was $48,272, and the median income for a family was $59,342. Males had a median income of $44,232 versus $34,661 for females. The per capita income for the CDP was $24,525. About 6.6% of families and 9.5% of the population were below the poverty line, including 9.5% of those under age 18 and 10.7% of those age 65 or over.

El Sobrante is also home to a growing Sikh population. The center of the Sikh community is the Gurdwara Sahib of El Sobrante (known for its large golden dome), which sits high in the hills above San Pablo Dam Road.

== Education ==
The El Sobrante Library of the Contra Costa County Library is located in El Sobrante. The library opened in 1961, and in 1975 it received an expansion that doubled the facility's size.

El Sobrante is in the West Contra Costa Unified School District.

Schools in El Sobrante include Betty Reid Soskin Middle School, named after Betty Reid Soskin, the Catalyst Academy, East Bay Waldorf School, and Sheldon Elementary School.

== In popular culture ==
According to Les Claypool in his 1996 song "El Sobrante Fortnight", an El Sobrante fortnight is "somewhere between two weeks and a decade". Former Green Day drummer John Kiffmeyer took his stage name, "Al Sobrante", from the town. The band Jawbreaker references El Sobrante as "El Sob" in their song "Boxcar", as well as Primus in their song Jerry Was a Race Car Driver.

== Notable people ==
- Musicians such as Kirk Hammett of Metallica and Exodus, Marc Biedermann of Blind Illusion, Les Claypool (former member of Blind Illusion, currently of Primus), Larry "Ler" LaLonde of Primus and Possessed, Jason Beebout of Samiam and Isocracy and John Kiffmeyer (known professionally as Al Sobrante) of Green Day and Isocracy all grew up in El Sobrante, and most of them attended De Anza High School. Many of these musicians have close ties. Hammett and Claypool were friends as children. LaLonde was a founding member of death metal pioneers Possessed, who toured with Metallica before joining Claypool in Primus, and Claypool auditioned to join Metallica; however Claypool was turned down because his style was too funky for Metallica.
- El Sobrante has been the home of many notable comic book artists, such as underground Joel Beck, who grew up in El Sobrante and attended De Anza High School, and his friend Roger Brand, who assisted legendary comics artists Gil Kane and Wally Wood. Later comics creators to come out of El Sobrante include New York Times Bestselling author Landry Walker, a student of De Anza High School who went on to work on Batman, Supergirl, The Incredibles, and Star Wars comics. DC and Image Comics artist Eric Jones who grew up in El Sobrante as well, but attended Salesian High School.
- Other notable residents include artist's model Flo Allen, who died while living in El Sobrante. As well as pioneering hypertext author Judy Malloy who lived in El Sobrante from 1995 to 2013, and wrote much of her work while living there.

== See also ==
- Garrity Creek
- San Pablo Creek
