= Alvarado Park =

Historic Place in Richmond, California

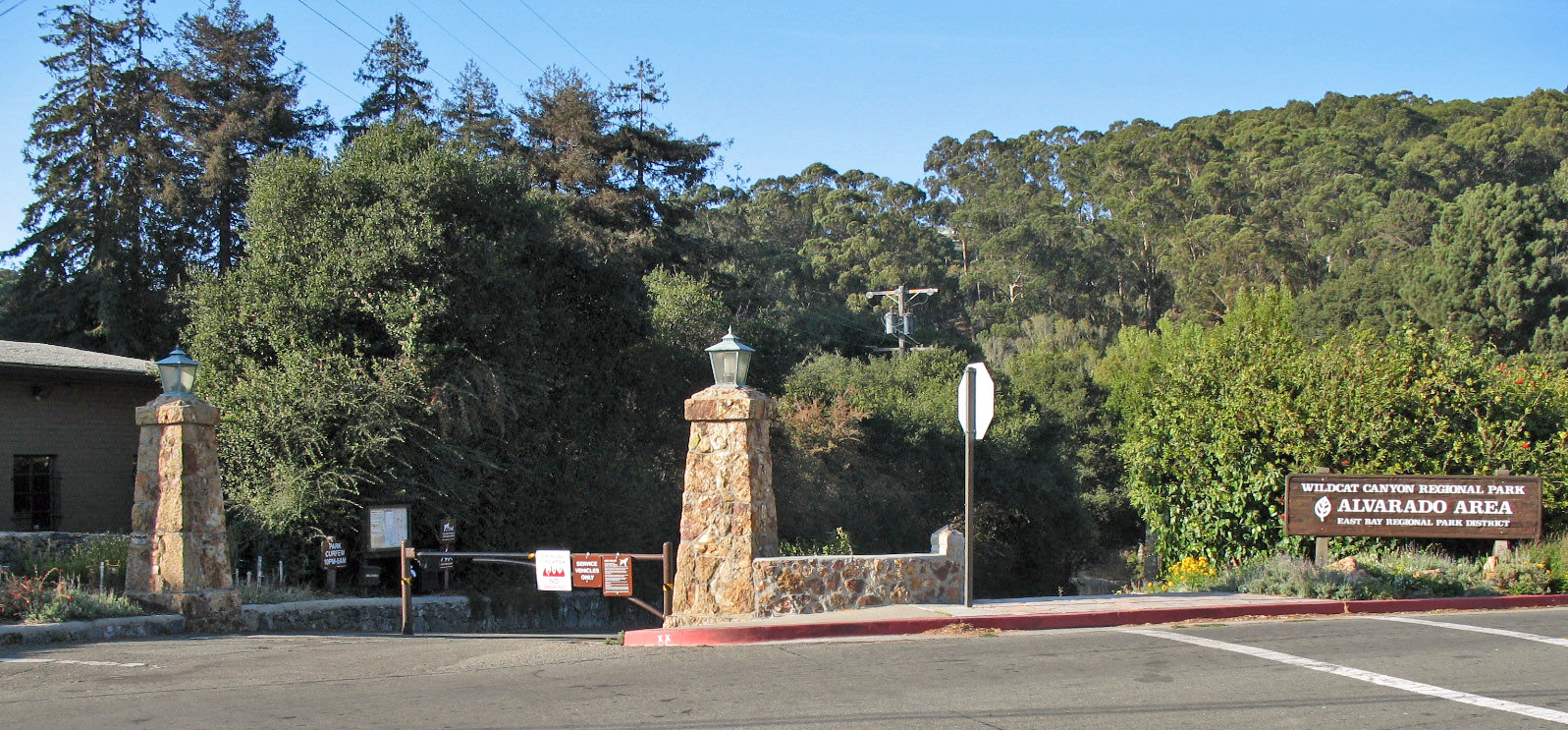

- Location within San Francisco Bay Area Location within California Location within the United States
- Location: Richmond, California (Richmond View)
- Coordinates: 37.95609°N 122.31294°W
- Area: 42.5-acre (17.2 ha)
- Created: 1909
- Operator: East Bay Regional Park District
- Alvarado Park
- U.S. National Register of Historic Places
- Architectural style: Rustic Park
- NRHP reference No.: 92000313
- Added to NRHP: April 9, 1992

Alvarado Area (formerly Grand Canyon Park) is a subsection of Wildcat Canyon Regional Park in Richmond, California and is a National Historic Place. It is located at the mouth of Wildcat Canyon in the Alvarado Area section. Between 1909 and 1923, Alvarado Park was a private park that was owned and operated by local residents. In 1923, it was donated to the city of Richmond. Later it was admitted into the East Bay Regional Park District.

== Acquisition and history ==
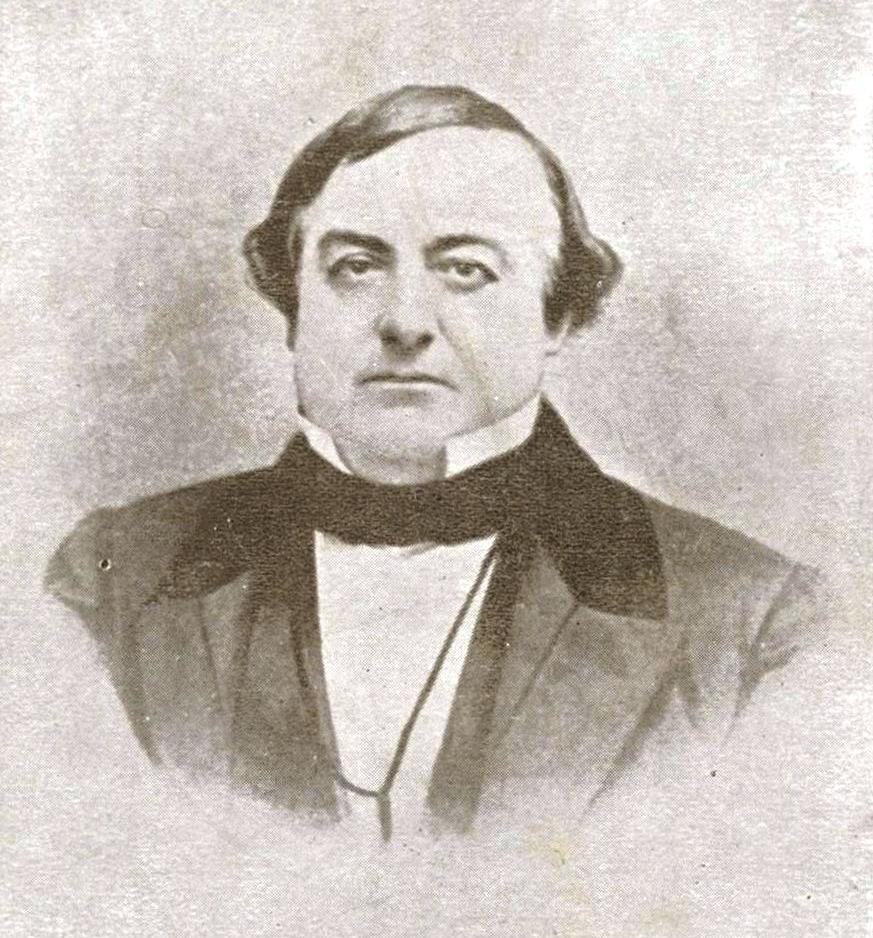
Alvarado Park is named for Juan Bautista Alvarado, a Californio statesman and Governor of California.

In ancient times the area was the site of one of the grandest of Ohlone native American villages. The Huichun band numbered 250 people at this site and lived here for 5,000 to 7,000 years. Then, in 1985, it was incorporated into Wildcat Canyon Regional Park and forms a historic district.

In its early years, Alvarado Park was served by its own streetcar line from the East Shore and Suburban Railway, a Key System precursor, which was later discontinued. The park district made certain improvements including a new children's play area, conversion of parking into meadows, and demolition of dilapidated structures. It was also the home of the Grande Vista Sanitarium, later known as Belgum Sanitarium. Though the associated buildings have since burned to the ground, their foundations and the surrounding grounds, including an orchard remain. The park also features distinctive and noted stone masonry, retaining walls, and classical stone lampposts. The lampposts are no longer lit. A stonework bridge spans Wildcat Creek in the park main entrance. The park district is currently struggling to return the river to a more natural state in hopes of restoring its fish population and their runs. The park also featured an open-air pavilion dance hall which was converted to a roller rink, and subsequently destroyed by fire.

== See also ==
- National Register of Historic Places listings in Contra Costa County, California
