= Castro Cove =

Coordinates: 37.956°N 122.401°W

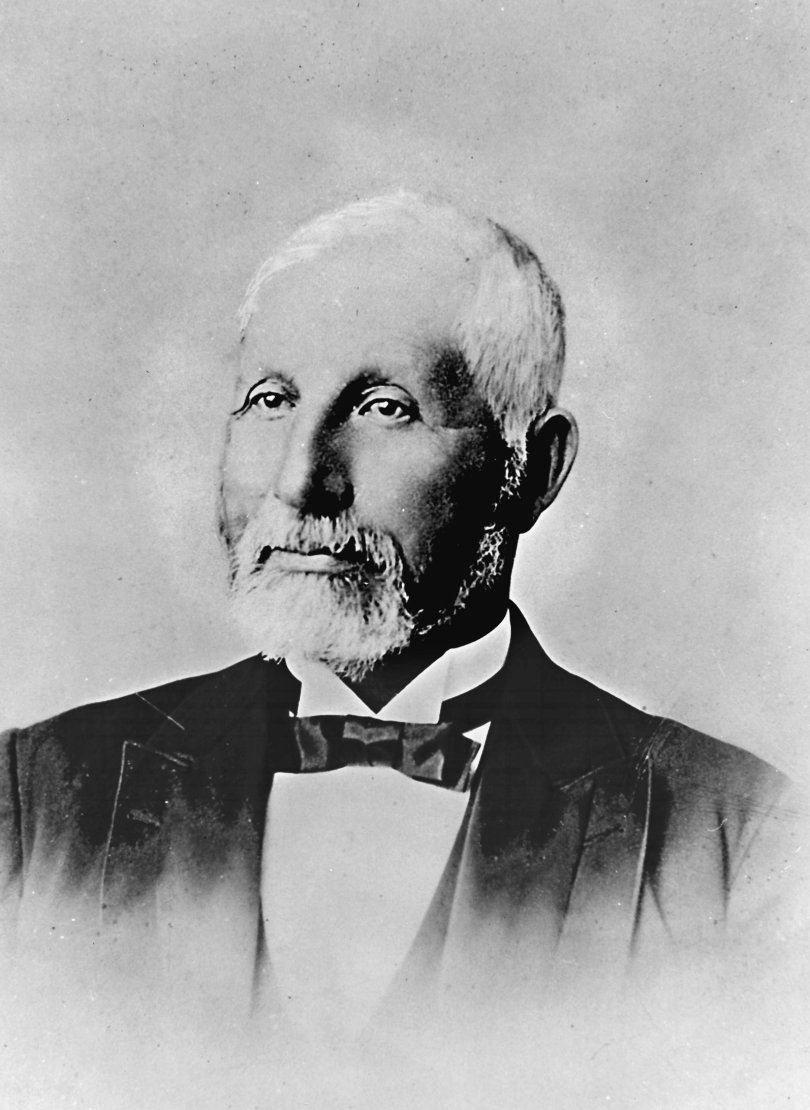
Castro Cove is named after Don Víctor Castro, a Californio ranchero and politician.

Castro Cove is a "portion of the San Pablo Bay" in Richmond, California located between Point San Pablo and the confluence of Wildcat Creek into Castro Creek.

== Overview ==
The cove is made up of mudflats, bay mud, and intertidal salt marsh owned by Chevron USA. The cove forms an important estuarine environmental resource for San Francisco Bay. It is the home of many endangered species including the Salt Marsh Harvest Mouse, Ridgway's rail, steelhead, and Olympia Oyster. Other benthic invertebrates, mammals, fish, and birds also live in the habitat; all the animals may have been injured by contamination, whether endangered or of least concern. Castro Cove is named after Don Víctor Castro.

== Pollution ==
The cove is also a recreational, fishing, boating, and shellfishing area. The Richmond Rod & Gun Club Yacht Harbor is located on the western coast of the cove. The Chevron Richmond Refinery located at the south end of the inlet dumps 5.6 million gallons daily of treated industrial use waters into the Cove, Castro Creek and San Pablo Bay. From 1902 until 1987 the refinery released various contaminants in its wastewater and other run-off, which severely contaminated the Bay mud of the cove. In 1998 the California Regional Water Quality Control Board began to plan cleanup of the site and pressured Chevron. The water board used the authority of the Bay Protection and Toxic Clean-up Program to require Chevron to produce a sediment characterization work plan in 1998. Years of discharge or polluted water left the cove with high levels of polycyclic aromatic hydrocarbons (PAHs) and mercury contamination.

== Cleanup ==
Between 1999 and 2001 benthic toxicity tests found PAHs and mercury levels at up to 507 mg/kg and 13 mg/kg respectively at this site and a 20-acre (81,000 m^{2}) portion was designated as an area of concern (AOC). The most contaminated, AOC is adjacent to the former wastewater outfall which has been relocated into San Pablo Bay. A California Environmental Quality Act (CEQA)-mandated mitigated negative declaration was completed and a corrective action plan was designed. The plan included a natural resource damage assessment will cordon off the AOC with steel sheet piling and have the contaminated muds and sediment dredged and pumped into a disused treatment pond. In that treatment pond the toxic waste would be dried and then neutralized with a stabilizing agent like fly ash or cement. The inactive pond would then be regraded and capped with vegetation. The remediation project was originally scheduled for the summer of 2007. In 2010, the final plan was released and Chevron reached an agreement to pay a 2.85 million settlement for the restoration.

The funds were used to complete two restoration projects:

Cullinan Ranch Restoration - San Pablo Bay, California

- Approximately 1,500 acres diked bay lands were restored to mature tidal marsh. The area includes tidal channels, mudflats, and salt marsh habitat, which is managed by the San Pablo Bay National Wildlife Refuge.

Dotson Family Marsh Restoration - Richmond, California

- Previously called Breuner Marsh, the land was renamed in honor of Dotson family who were early advocates of preserving the area. The project included restoration or enhancement of 150 acres of wetlands and coastal prairie. Public access was also provided via a raised boardwalk, which completes a previously unconnected 1.5-mile section in the San Francisco Bay Trail.
