= Castro Creek =

Location
- Country: United States
- State: California
- Region: Contra Costa County

Physical characteristics
- Source
  - location: Chevron USA Richmond Oil Refinery
  - coordinates: 37°56′15″N 122°23′13″W
- Mouth: San Pablo Bay
  - coordinates: 37°58′6″N 122°24′26″W
  - elevation: 0 ft (0 m)

Basin features
- Tributaries
  - right: Wildcat Creek

Castro Creek is a creek in Richmond, California, in the western part of the city adjacent to the Chevron Oil Refinery. Wildcat Creek drains into it directly and though other Wildcat Marsh tributaries into Castro Cove of San Pablo Bay. The creek drains from the drainage basin of the surrounding area and was once part of the channel that separated the island of Point Richmond with the mainland.

== Name ==
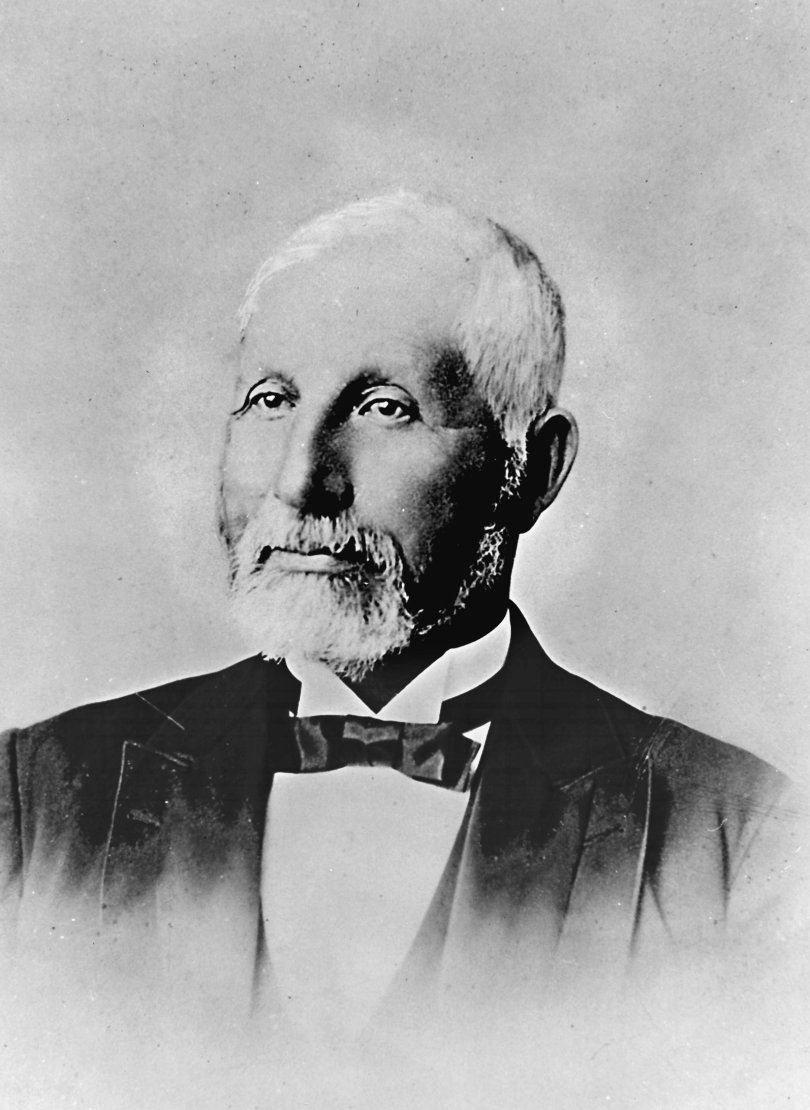
Castro Creak is named after Don Víctor Castro, a Californio ranchero and politician who owned the creek, as part of his Rancho San Pablo.

The stream is waterway is named after Don Víctor Castro, the owner of the area when it was Rancho San Pablo.

== Description ==
The Chevron Richmond Refinery dumps wastewater into the creek routinely 500 yards north of the confluence with Wildcat Creek and also in a drainage. Other waste may only be dumped into the creek through a drainage ditch on Castro Street during high intensity rainfall. Castro Creek is a fishing, shell-fishing, and recreation area. Its estuarine habitat is essential habitat for several endangered species. The creek is also a fish spawning and migration center. The refinery creates 5.6 million US gallons (21,000 m^{3}) per day of byproduct refinery process water, cooling water, storm water and other wastewater which it discharges into Castro Creek, Castro Cove, Wildcat Marsh, and San Pablo Bay. Castro Cove has become very polluted from 85 years of unbridled discharge of waste waters with PAHs and mercury from the Chevron Oil Refinery and is scheduled to begin cleanup efforts in summer 2007.

== See also ==
- Castro Cove
- Cerrito Creek - marked the southern border of Castro's ranch
- List of watercourses in the San Francisco Bay Area
