= Wildcat Marsh =

Wetland in Richmond, California

Coordinates: 37.956°N 122.387°W

Wildcat Marsh is the wetlands delta formed by the mouth of Wildcat Creek at its confluence with Castro Creek in Richmond, California. The marsh is critical habitat for endangered species and has been contaminated and damaged by runoff from the Chevron Richmond Refinery, the city's landfill, and a salvage yard. The marsh was isolated from tidal effects, but restoration efforts are underway as is the closure of the landfill and cleanup of the mudflats contaminated by mercury and PAHs from the refinery.

== See also ==
- Castro Creek
- Castro Cove
