= Shollenberger Park =

Park in California, United States

Coordinates: 38°13′30″N 122°36′00″W

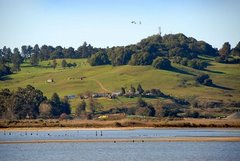
- Photo: Scott Hess
- Interactive map of Shollenberger Park
- Type: Municipal
- Location: Petaluma, California
- Area: 165 acres (0.67 km^{2}), 248 acres (1.00 km^{2}) with adjacent Alman Marsh and Petaluma River Marsh
- Created: 1995
- Visitors: 150,000
- Status: Open all year

Shollenberger Park is a 165-acre (0.67 km^{2}) wetland park located in Petaluma, California. Together with the 80-acre (320,000 m^{2}) Alman Marsh, and 260-acre (1.1 km^{2}) Ellis Creek which opened to the public in July 2009, a total of 505 acres (2.04 km^{2}) are accessible to the public. The entirety is referred to as the "Petaluma Wetlands".

Named after Richard Shollenberger, a park chief, the park is part of one of the last wetlands of its kind in the country. It is a bird watching paradise, attracting 231 species of birds, according to the last survey, including threatened species. The Audubon Society has ranked Shollenberger Park as an important birding site, and the San Francisco Chronicle ranks it as a top destination for nature-lovers. The park is home to rare animal and plant species, such as the endangered salt marsh harvest mouse.

The park attracts 150,000 visitors annually and serves as an outdoor classroom for children as well as a wildlife research location. The Petaluma Wetlands Alliance, a 501(c)(3) environmental and educational nonprofit, does habitat restoration, gives bird and wildlife tours, and provides a third grade educational program consistent with California Educational curriculum. Point Blue Conservation Science, a non-profit wildlife conservation and research organization, is located adjacent to the park.

The area was formerly known as Cader Lane Ponds.

== List of birdlife ==
- Grebes – Clark's grebe, eared grebe, horned grebe, pied-billed grebe, western grebe
- Loons – common loon, red-throated loon
- Pelicans – American white pelican, brown pelican
- Cormorants – double-crested cormorant
- Herons, egrets, bitterns – American bittern, black-crowned night heron, great blue heron, great egret, green heron, snowy egret, cattle egret, least bittern
- Ibises and spoonbills – white-faced ibis
- Ducks, geese, swans – American wigeon, barrow's goldeneye, blue-winged teal, brant, bufflehead, cackling goose, Canada goose, canvasback, cinnamon teal, common goldeneye, common merganser, Eurasian wigeon, gadwall, greater scaup, greater white-fronted goose, green-winged teal, hooded merganser, lesser scaup, long-tail duck (old squaw), mallard, northern pintail, northern shoveler, redhead, red-breasted merganser, ring-necked duck, Ross' goose, ruddy duck, snow goose, surf scoter, tundra swan, white-winged scoter, wood duck
- New World vultures – turkey vulture
- Hawks and allies – bald eagle, Cooper's hawk, ferruginous hawk, golden eagle, northern harrier, osprey, red-shouldered hawk, red-tailed hawk, rough-legged hawk, sharp-shinned hawk, white-tailed kite
- Falcons and caracaras – American kestrel, merlin, peregrine, prairie falcon
- New World quail – California quail
- Rails and coots – American coot, black rail, Ridgway's Rail, common moorhen, sora, Virginia Rail
- Plovers and lapwings – black-bellied plover, killdeer, Pacific golden plover, semipalmated plover, snowy plover
- Stilts and avocets – American avocet, black-necked stilt
- Sandpipers, phalaropes, allies – Baird's sandpiper, black turnstone, dunlin, greater yellowlegs, least sandpiper, lesser yellowlegs, long-billed curlew, long-billed dowitcher, marbled godwit, pectoral sandpiper, red phalarope, red-necked phalarope, ruddy turnstone, ruff, semipalmated sandpiper, short-tailed sandpiper, short-billed dowitcher, solitary sandpiper, stilt sandpiper, spotted sandpiper, western sandpiper, whimbrel, Wilson's (common) snipe, Wilson's phalarope, willet
- Gulls, terns, allies – Arctic tern, black tern, black skimmer, Bonaparte's gull, California gull, Caspian tern, common tern, elegant tern, Forster's tern, glaucous gull, glaucous-winged gull, herring gull, mew gull, Thayer's gull, western gull
- Pigeons and doves – Eurasian collared dove, mourning dove, rock dove (pigeon)
- Owls – barn owl, burrowing owl, great horned owl, short-eared owl
- Swifts – Vaux's swift, white-throated swift
- Hummingbirds – Allen's hummingbird, Anna's hummingbird
- Kingfishers – belted kingfisher
- Woodpeckers – acorn woodpecker, downy woodpecker, hairy woodpecker, northern flicker, Nuttall's woodpecker
- Tyrant flycatchers – ash-throated flycatcher, black phoebe, Pacific-slope flycatcher, Say's phoebe, tropical kingbird, western kingbird, willow flycatcher
- Shrikes – loggerhead shrike, northern shrike
- Crows and jays – American crow, common raven, Steller's jay, western scrub-jay
- Larks – horned lark
- Swallows and martins – bank swallow, barn swallow, cliff swallow, northern rough-winged swallow, tree swallow, violet-green swallow
- Chickadees and titmice – brown creeper, chestnut-backed chickadee, oak titmouse, red-breasted nuthatch, white-breasted nuthatch
- Long-tailed tits – bushtit
- Wrens – Bewick's wren, marsh wren, house wren
- Kinglets – ruby-crowned kinglet, golden-crowned kinglet, blue-gray gnatcatcher
- Thrushes – American robin, western bluebird, hermit thrush, Swainson's thrush
- Mockingbirds and thrashers – northern mockingbird
- Starlings and mynas – European starling
- Wagtails and pipits – American pipit
- Waxwings – cedar waxwing
- Wood-warblers – black-throated gray warbler, chestnut-sided warbler, common yellowthroat, orange-crowned warbler, palm warbler, Townsend's warbler, Wilson's warbler, yellow warbler, yellow-rumped warbler
- Tanagers, cardinals and allies – western tanager
- New World sparrows – American tree swallow, California towhee, clay-colored sparrow, dark-eyed junco, fox sparrow, golden-crowned sparrow, lark sparrow, Lincoln's sparrow, Savannah sparrow, song sparrow, spotted towhee, swamp sparrow, white-crowned sparrow, white-throated sparrow
- Grosbeaks – black-headed grosbeak
- Blackbirds]], orioles and allies – Brewer's blackbird, brown-headed cowbird, Bullock's oriole, great-tailed grackle, hooded oriole, orchard oriole, red-winged blackbird, tri-colored blackbird, western meadowlark
- Finches and allies – American goldfinch, house finch, lesser goldfinch, pine siskin
- Old World sparrows – house sparrow
- Exotics – mute swan, black swan
