= Wildcat Creek (California) =

Wildcat Creek Arroyo Seco, Arroyo Chiquito
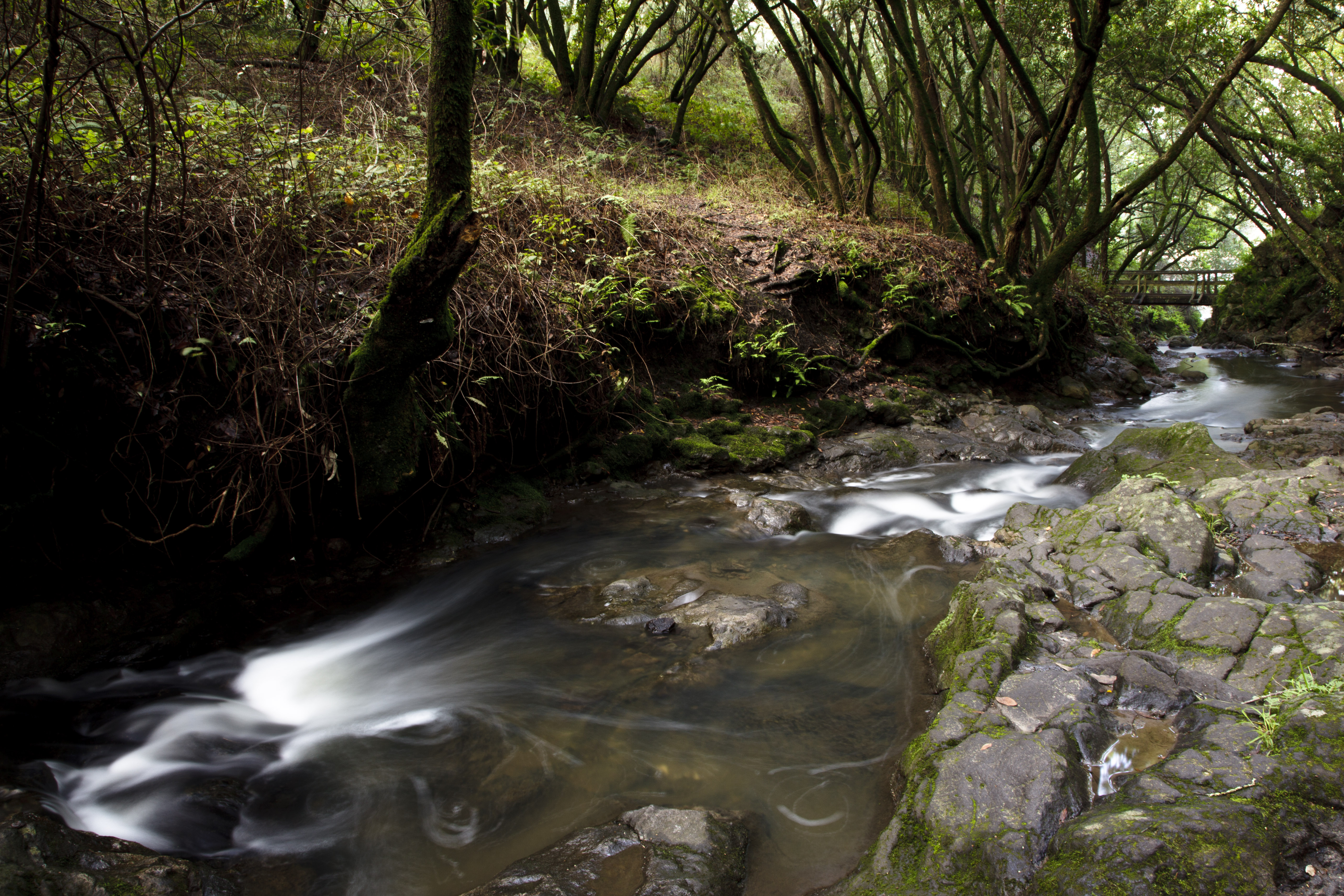
- Wildcat Creek in 2011

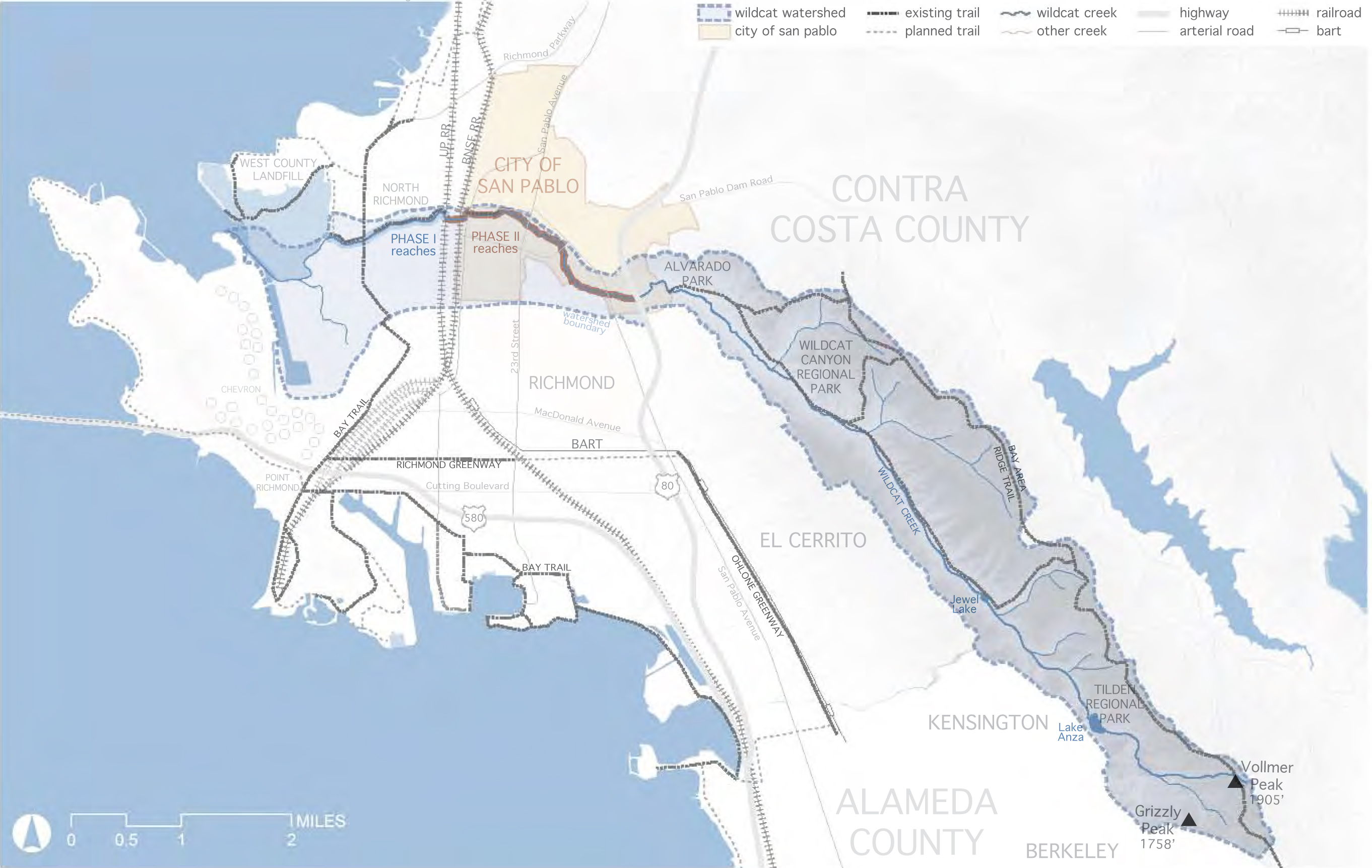
- Map of the Wildcat Creek watershed

Location
- Country: United States
- State: California
- Region: Contra Costa County
- Cities: San Pablo, Richmond

Physical characteristics
- Source: Vollmer Peak, Berkeley Hills
  - location: Tilden Regional Park
  - coordinates: 37°52′55″N 122°13′34″W
  - elevation: 1,515 ft (462 m)
- Mouth: Castro Creek
  - location: Richmond, California
  - coordinates: 37°57′12″N 122°23′19″W
  - elevation: 16 ft (4.9 m)
- Length: 12.5 mi (20.1 km)

Basin features
- Tributaries
  - right: Laurel Creek, Havey Creek

Wildcat Creek is a 13.4-mile-long (21.6 km) creek which flows through Wildcat Canyon situated between the Berkeley Hills and the San Pablo Ridge, emptying into San Pablo Bay in Contra Costa County, northern California.

== History ==
In 1772, the first recorded Spanish expedition crossed Wildcat Creek, although the Spaniards may have traveled this far north as early as 1769. The 1772 Fages and 1776 de Anza expeditions received festive greetings at two villages along Wildcat Creek, one of which was estimated at 100 – 200 people in size. Within three decades, nearly all the native Huchiun had been forced to move to Mission Dolores and convert to Christianity.

On an 1830 diseño of the Rancho San Pablo Wildcat Creek appears as Arroyo Seco (Dry Creek). Later it was also known as Arroyo Chiquito (Tiny Creek).

An 1861 map indicates that Wildcat Creek was called Little San Pablo Creek then. "Big" San Pablo Creek is located in the next drainage east of the drainage of Wildcat Creek. There are over fifty geographic place names in California with the word "wildcat", which either refers to the historic presence of bobcats (Lynx rufus) or to its meaning as an "unsound scheme".

== Watershed ==
The Wildcat Creek watershed drains 11.1 square miles (29 km^{2}). The creek originates on Vollmer Peak in Tilden Regional Park just east of the city of Berkeley. It feeds the artificial Lake Anza (constructed in 1938) as well as the smaller reservoir Jewel Lake (constructed in 1921) along its course. In its lower course, it passes through the city of San Pablo and portions of the city of Richmond. Where it exits the hills, it passes through Alvarado Park, which includes a WPA-constructed stone arch bridge over the creek. It also courses through San Pablo's civic center and Davis Park. Wildcat Creek culminates in the 387-acre (157 ha) Wildcat Marsh and thence to San Pablo Bay.

== Ecology ==
The Wildcat San Pablo Creeks Watershed Council won the Governors Environmental and Economic Leadership award in 2003. Founded in 1985, it is the oldest, continuing running urban watershed council in California.

In 2004, the Wildcat San Pablo Watershed Council began work on the Wildcat Creek Watershed Restoration Plan (WRAP), to address recurring flood damages within the City of San Pablo. In April, 2010, the plan was published and addressed three goals:

1. Reduce flood risk based on Wildcat Creek's 100-year flood flows and improve stormwater management in low-lying neighborhoods.
2. Enhance riparian habitat, specifically focused on stream resident coastal rainbow trout (Oncorhynchus mykiss irideus) and the potential restoration of anadromous steelhead migration.
3. Develop recreational resources for the community, specifically a fully connected two-mile (3.2 km) Wildcat Creek Trail through the city.

In September 2010 the City of San Pablo announced that it had received a $1.8 million grant from the state Department of Water Resources to clean up Wildcat Creek.

Wildcat Creek supported a steelhead run historically, but degradation of habitat and construction of passage barriers from urbanization likely resulted in their extirpation sometime after 1915. The dams that form both of these artificial lakes Lake Anza and Jewel Lake are impassable barriers to spawning steelhead. In September 1983, the East Bay Regional Park District (EBRPD) planted 615 steelhead from Redwood Creek (tributary to San Leandro Creek) into Wildcat Creek between Alvarado Park and the Regional Parks Botanic Garden. The EBPRD reported that no trout were present in Wildcat Creek prior to this stocking, so that the newly established population would provide a second and separate source for a "precarious" and "unique" genetic stock. This re-introduction has been successful with steelhead reproducing in the creek below Jewel Lake. According to CEMAR's San Francisco Estuary Watersheds Evaluation of 2007, only 5.1 miles (8.2 km) of the watershed's total 22.22 miles (35.76 km) of stream channel is suitable and available to steelhead.

Recently the East Bay has seen a renaissance of the native coastal rainbow trout in the watershed, and some have been spotted in the creek in Downtown Richmond nesting in submerged shopping carts and other garbage. The fish have also been spotted in Tilden Regional Park in the Berkeley Hills near the park's merry-go-round and a potamodromous population makes its way up the creek from Lake Anza every spring to spawn. A second native fish, the three-spined stickleback (Gasterosteus aculeatus) thrives in the creek and its tributaries.

The recovering 387-acre (157 ha) Wildcat Marsh (once stretching to San Pablo Creek as part of a dynamic, contiguous 2,000-acre (810 ha) system) supports a diversity of endangered and threatened species, including the California clapper rail (Rallus longirostris obsoletus), the black rail (Laterallus jamaicensis), the salt marsh harvest mouse (Reithrodontomys raviventris), and the San Pablo vole (Microtus californicus sanpabloensis).

=== Potamodromous rainbow trout population ===
In April 1991, a student at the University California, Berkeley electrofished the two perennial reaches of Wildcat Creek to determine the condition of O. mykiss populations. The upper reach was located above Lake Anza, while the lower reach was at the northwest edge of Wildcat Canyon Regional Park. The upper reach produced 46 O. mykiss (86–283 millimetres (3.4–11.1 in) FL). In the lower reach, 71 O. mykiss were caught (71–194 millimetres (2.8–7.6 in)). The resulting study reported that the presence of multiple age classes in both the upper and lower reaches indicated successful spawning in the two areas (Cohen 1991). The study also noted age 3+ O. mykiss from Lake Anza spawning in upper reaches of Wildcat Creek.

== See also ==
- List of watercourses in the San Francisco Bay Area
