= Chevron Richmond Refinery =

Petroleum refinery in Richmond, California

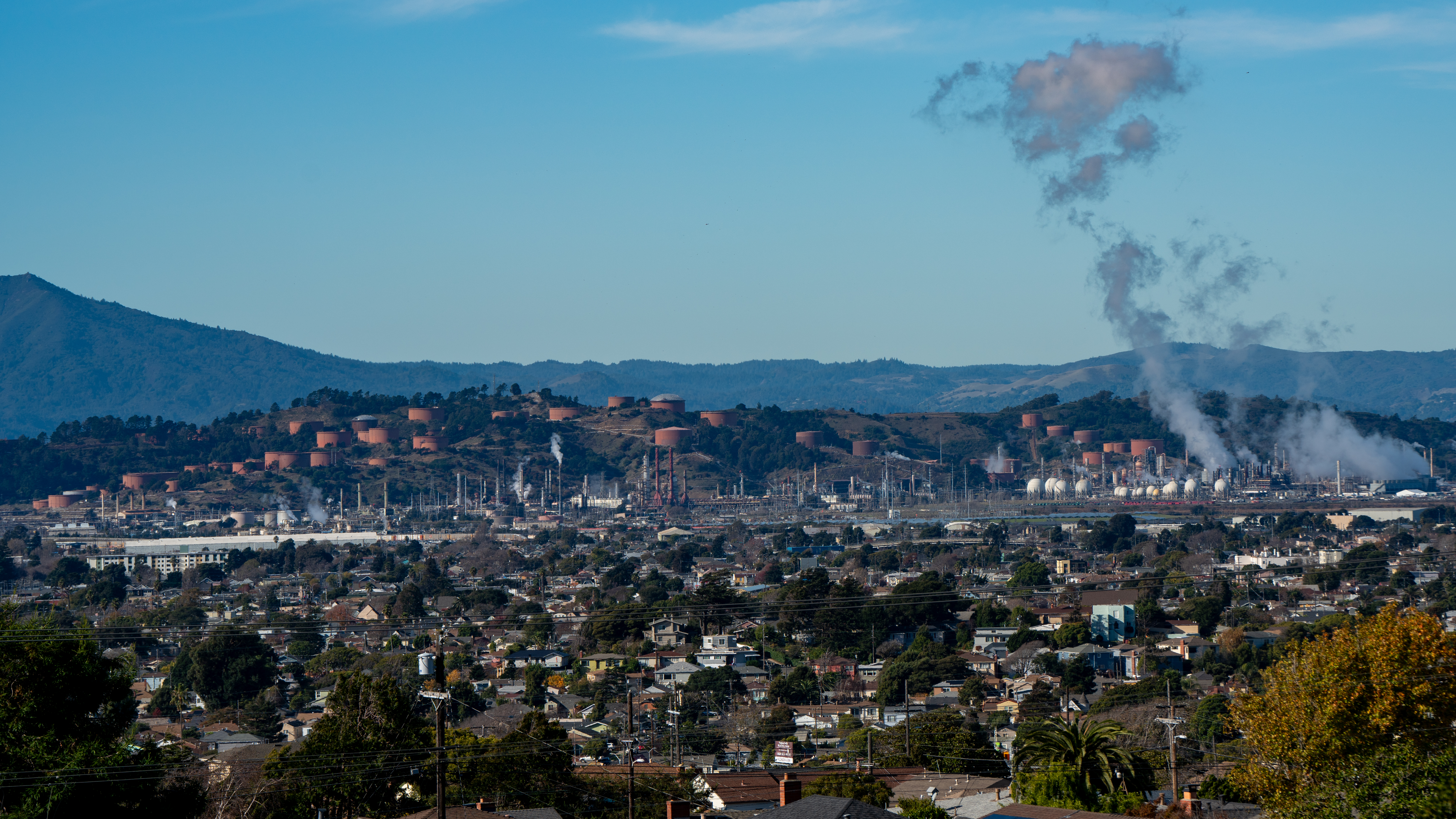
- The refinery with Mount Tamalpais and the Marin Hills in the background, the city of Richmond in the foreground

- Location within San Francisco Bay Area Location within California Location within the United States
- Location: Richmond, California, United States; 37°56′32″N 122°23′43″W

Refinery details
- Owner: Chevron Corporation
- Opened: 1902
- Capacity: 240,000 barrels per day (38,000 m^{3}/d)
- No. of employees: 1,200

The Chevron Richmond Refinery is a 2,900-acre (1,200 ha) petroleum refinery in Richmond, California, on San Francisco Bay. It is owned and operated by Chevron Corporation and employs more than 1,200 workers, making it the city's largest employer. The refinery processes approximately 240,000 barrels (38,000 m^{3}) of crude oil a day in the manufacture of petroleum products and other chemicals. The refinery's primary products are motor gasoline, jet fuel, diesel fuel and lubricants.

== History ==
=== Beginnings ===
The refinery was established several years before the City of Richmond was incorporated in 1905. Construction on the refinery began in 1901 between the Potrero Hills and the marshlands in the Point Richmond District; the refinery was opened in 1902. The refinery was built by Standard Oil and its first headquarters was in an abandoned farm house at the former site of the Peters and Silva Farms. The complex was described as "colossal" at the time and to this day it remains a very large complex of its kind. In its first year of operation the plant could process 10,000 barrels (1,600 m^{3}) of oil per day and had a tankage capacity of 185,000 barrels (29,400 m^{3}) in that same first year. William Rheem played a key role in the facility's construction and implementation, being the project manager and the installation's first superintendent. Rheem continued on to be a key and historic civic figure in the City of Richmond. The presence of the burgeoning refinery transformed the small town of Richmond from a rural agricultural community with 200 residents to a company town of several thousand within a few years.

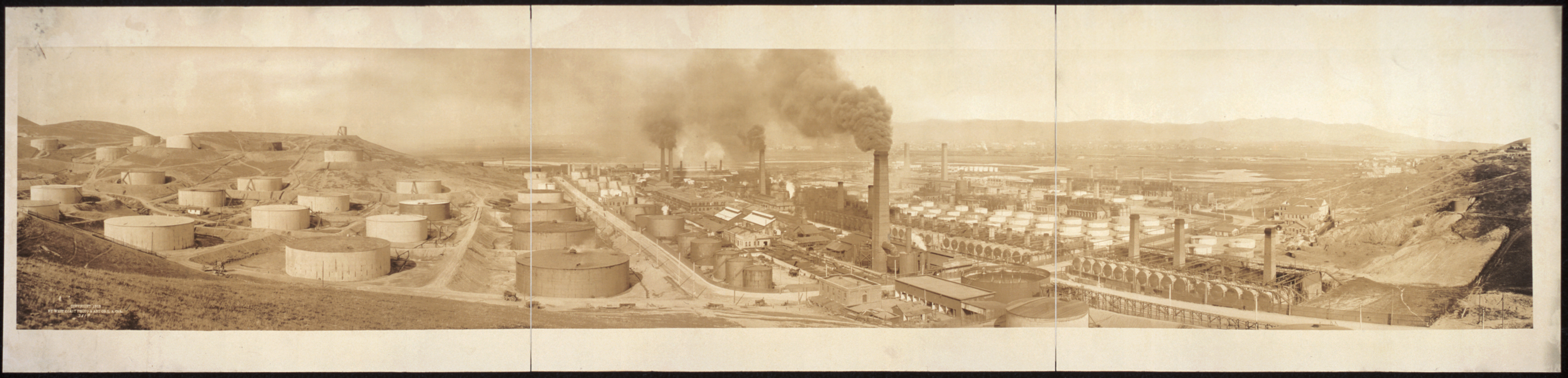
The refinery pictured in 1913.

Crude oil is delivered by, and refined products distributed by, oil tankers using a long wharf extending into San Francisco Bay. Pipe lines connect the wharf to the refinery; and a parallel 42-inch (1.1 m) narrow gauge electric railway was built to transport packaged goods, shipboard supplies and personnel. The refinery shops built six power cars and three unpowered trailers for use under 2.25 miles (3.62 km) of overhead line. Trolley operation began in 1905 serving a shipside hotel, ship chandlery, shook factory, barrel works, and some refinery administration offices. The trolley line was replaced by trucks and buses in 1948.

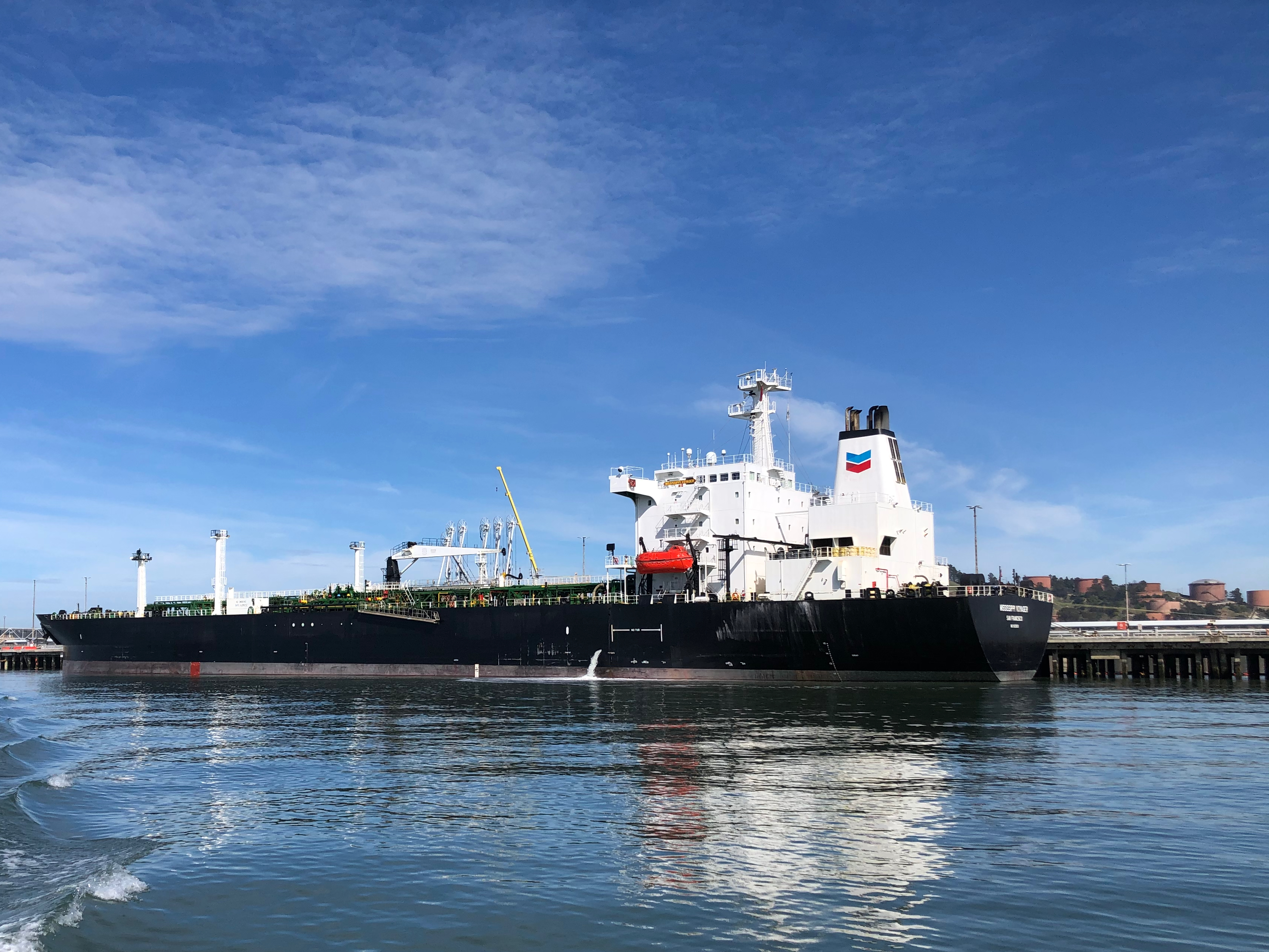
Chevron oil tanker (Mississippi Voyager)

=== Growth ===
The number of passenger cars in the United States rose from 1.6 million to 5.6 million from 1914 to 1918. Motor trucks, farm tractors, and aircraft all increased at a comparable rate. As a result, the demand for gasoline, lubricants and other petroleum products intensified. The Richmond refinery was in an excellent position with its plentiful crude oil, state-of-art equipment and prime location to capitalize on the increased demand for petroleum products on the West Coast. By 1915, the refinery spread across 435 acres (176 ha), employed 1,700 workers, and had a capacity of 60,000 barrels (9,500 m^{3}) a day. Not only did the refinery produce transportation fuels, it also had a grease plant, an asphaltum plant, a can factory, a barrel works, a machine shop and a tank car repair shop.

When the United States entered World War I in 1917, the Richmond refinery became a critical producer of fuel for trucks, tankers, trains, and planes in the war effort. Historian Gerald White reported that the "high quality of the medicinal white oil developed at Richmond to take the place of Russian white oil, cut off by the war, caused an executive of E.R. Squibb & Sons to comment that the Richmond product was 'superior to the best oil' ever imported."

At the end of the war the company shifted its focus back to basic product research and in 1919 constructed a well-equipped red brick laboratory building that still stands today. Development manager Ralph A. Halloran's emphasis on centralized, systematic research helped the department gain greater prestige in support of the company's tenet, "Research First - Then Advertising," which ensured that a product was thoroughly tested before being introduced to the public. By 1924, the laboratory's staff grew to 75 skilled employees, who engaged in tests and experiments, not only to develop new uses for petroleum, but to improve existing processes. In 1938 the refinery constructed a new Hydro Plant for the production of synthetic aviation gasoline. It was the first in the Western United States to produce synthetic gasoline by combining purified hydrogen gas with an unsaturated gas by-product from gasoline cracking operations.

With the onset of World War II the refinery saw major changes. Many employees left for service in the U.S. military and close to 400 women joined the refinery workforce. The refinery shifted production to high-octane fuel and other products to meet military needs. In 1943 a toluene plant was constructed to supply the key ingredient for TNT and later, at the request of the U.S. military, was converted to production of 100-octane gasoline. The U.S. Secretaries of War and Navy and the Petroleum Administrator commended the refinery for exceeding the production of aviation gasoline requested by the government. In 1945, the Richmond refinery won its fifth U.S. Army-Navy "E" award for its support of the military effort.

=== Modernization ===
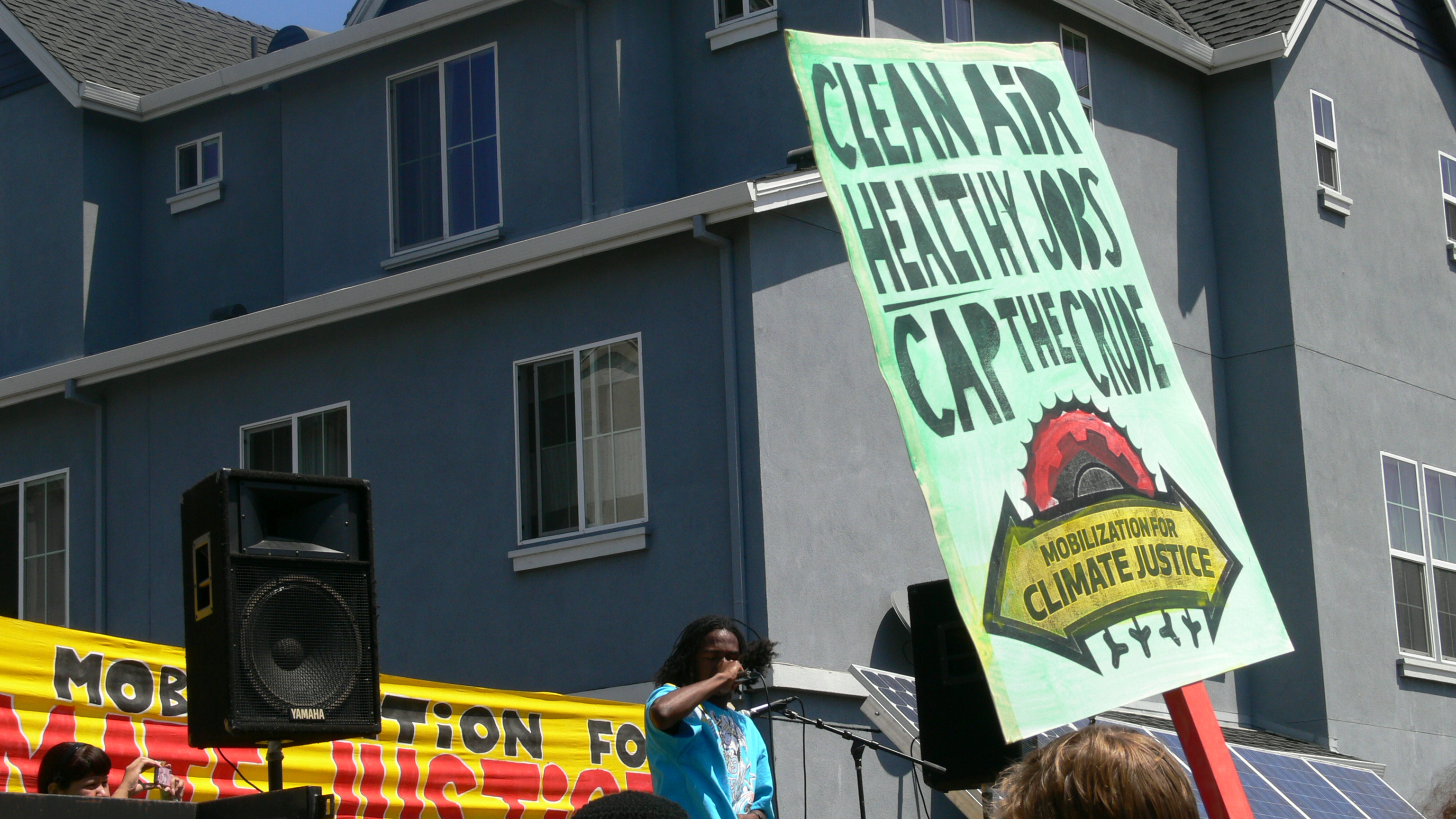
A protest to modernization that would allow for refining of more polluting high sulphur crude

Following the end of World War II, the refinery began a long-range modernization and expansion of its facilities to accommodate the new post-war consumer demands for petroleum products. The refinery constructed units that increased production of highly refined products for the postwar generation of higher-compression engines. In 1951, a 50,000-barrel (7,900 m^{3}) residuum stripper was constructed to convert heavy residual fuel oil into lighter products. In 1959, the company made a major breakthrough when it developed the Isocracking process which uses catalysts to rearrange the existing molecules of heavy fuel oils to remove sulfur and convert low-value fuel oils into higher-yield products such as gasoline.

The company also completed a new fluid catalytic cracking unit capable of processing 40,000 barrels (6,400 m^{3}) daily of feed stock, further adding to the high-octane gasolines being demanded in rapidly increasing quantities by modern, high-compression automobile engines. In 1965, a breakthrough came when the Richmond refinery opened the world's largest Isomax hydrocracking complex. The unit converts heavy petroleum oils to lighter stocks for gasoline and other higher valued products. The 62,000-barrel (9,900 m^{3})-a-day unit increased the plant's gasoline output by 40%. A solvent de-asphalting plant and a hydrogen manufacturing plant were also constructed to support the Isomax and were the largest of their kind ever constructed.

The post-war years were also marked by a dramatic increase in demand for petrochemicals to serve as the building blocks for hundreds of consumer products. In 1951, a new unit was constructed to manufacture paraxylene, a basic material used for making synthetic fibers, and was the first of its kind to produce the chemical from petroleum. The West Coast's first phenol plant was completed in 1954 for the production of lubricating oil and lubricating oil additive, resins and plastic, and plywood adhesives.

A year later, another chemical plant for the manufacture of isophthalic was constructed, the first in the US. Isophthalic is a chemical intermediate used in plastics and surface coatings. In 1960, construction began on a $17 million complex for production of para- and orthoxylenes, important chemical intermediates, at the Richmond refinery. Another major project increased the capacity for production of alpha olefins, used extensively in the manufacture of "soft" detergents, lubricant additives, plastics and plasticizers. None of these chemical plants are still in operation today except for the alpha olefin plant, which produces an intermediate chemical for the production of Techron, Chevron's gasoline additive.

=== Recent history ===
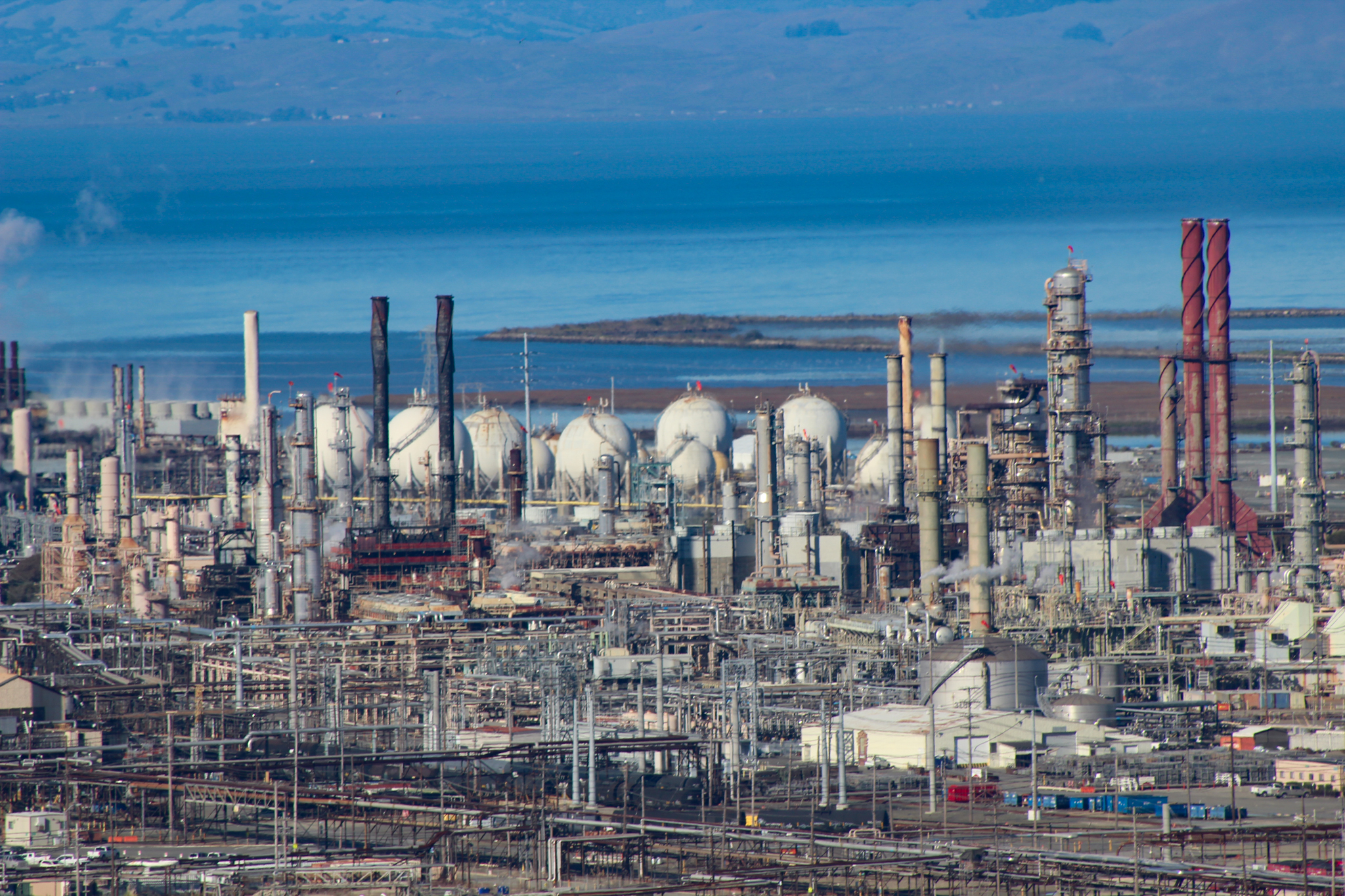
Distillation & reforming plant detail, the large white spherical containers store propane and butane, San Pablo Bay is visible in the background

During the 1970s and 1980s as the dynamics of the United States petroleum industry were changing, the refinery was transformed to produce higher-value, higher-volume fuels and lubricating oils and to comply with increasingly stringent state and federal policies. These policies called for the refinery to reduce air emissions and waste, treat water, and prevent oil spills.

In order to comply with federal mandates for reduced-lead gasoline the refinery installed reforming units in 1971 to produce higher octane gasoline material. In 1975, the refinery added a desulfurization unit for the production of low-sulfur fuel oil, primarily to supply the growing needs of California electric utility companies. The expansion was also designed to process greater quantities of high-sulfur crudes and products that met environmental specifications. During the expansion the refinery also built two 750,000-barrel (119,000 m^{3}) storage tanks, the largest in the United States, to receive marine cargos.

In 1979, a worldwide shortage of crude oil, along with a shift in the availability of quality crudes, presented challenges to manufacturing operations. Chevron invested in the Richmond refinery, improving their flexibility for handling different types of crude oil, responding to changing product standards, installing energy conservation equipment, and complying with environmental or regulatory requirements. A $17 million direct digital computer control system was first installed in the Isomax plant, and later expanded to include all plants. This enabled the refinery to produce higher-grade products and reduce energy consumption.

In 1984, the construction of a major lubricating oil manufacturing plant increased Richmond's lube oil base-stock output from 3,800 to 8,500 barrels (1,350 m^{3}) a day, using hydrocracking and hydrorefining processes developed by Chevron Research. Later, in 1993, a major research breakthrough occurred when Chevron introduced Isodewaxing technology. This new technique maximized the production of high quality base oils while co-producing high-value light products and allowed for the economical production of base oils that meet specifications calling for lighter-viscosity lubricant grades.

During the 1990s the refinery began producing Chevron Plus Unleaded gasoline, which replaced regular leaded gasoline in California in 1992. Methyl tert-butyl ether, or MTBE, was added as an oxygenate and to raise the octane number. MTBE was found to contaminate groundwater, and in 2004 was replaced with ethanol.

In 2001 former vice mayor and councilman John Márquez stated that he did not think that the refinery's numerous toxic spills were intentional. He also stated that he thought the refinery was safe. He received campaign funding from BAPAC, that was backed by a $1,500 donation from Chevron Corporation. Marquez also opposed measure T and the 16,000,000 dollars that it would bring the city from large industries like Chevron.

In 2002, the 100th anniversary of the Richmond refinery, the plant had over 1,300 employees, covered 2,900 acres, operated 30 plants, and had the ability to move 340,000 barrels (54,000 m^{3}) per day of raw materials and finished products across its long wharf. By 2006, the refinery had a capacity of 225,000 barrels (35,800 m^{3}) a day and processed more crude oil than any other plant in the Bay Area and ranked among the major refineries in the U.S.

In March 2014, the company launched a website to provide Richmond-area community news.

=== Present day refinery ===
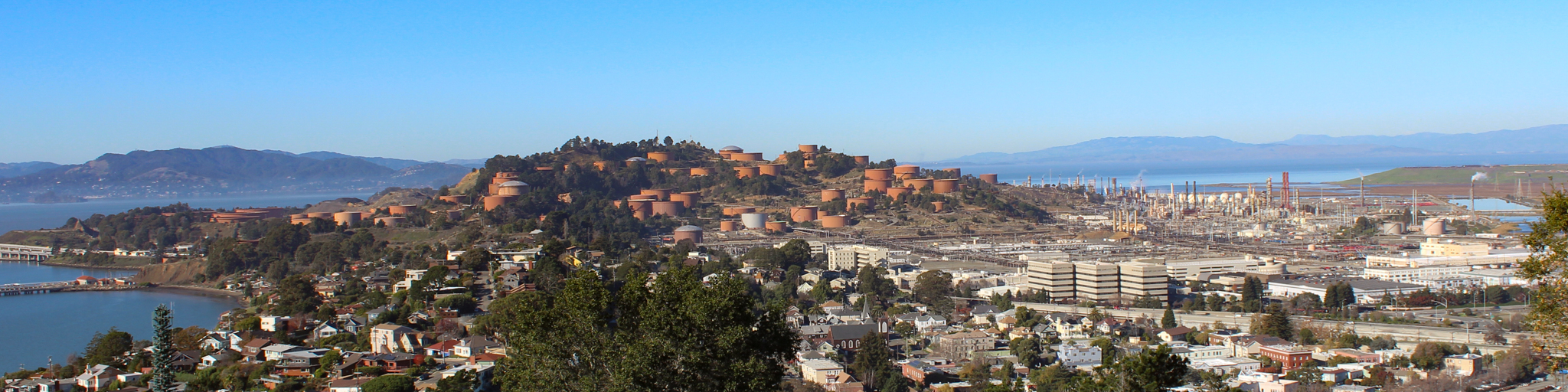

== Incidents ==
=== 1989 explosion and fire ===
On April 10, 1989, an explosion and fire occurred in a cracking column at the refinery. A total of 8 workers and firefighters were injured. Three workers suffered second and third degree burns. As a result, in September 1989 the Occupational Safety and Health Administration fined Chevron $877,000 for "willfully failing to provide protective equipment for employees." Chevron employees had "repeatedly requested" protective equipment since the early 1980s but the company had refused despite more than 70 fires in the plant since 1984. Elizabeth Dole, the US Secretary of Labor, said: "OSHA's investigation makes clear that Chevron knew of the need for protective equipment and clothing for employees who, though not assigned to the fire brigade, were responsible for assisting firefighters in their unit." Chevron lodged notices of contest against the penalties but in 1991 agreed to pay the U.S. Department of Labor $275,000 "in full financial settlement."

=== 1999 explosion and fire ===
On March 25, 1999, there was an explosion and fire at the refinery that spread noxious fumes and sent hundreds of Richmond residents to hospitals. After the 1999 explosion, residue was left in nearby water sources and soil which affected many nearby residents. The explosion accidentally sent out sulfuric gases into the air, affecting many nearby communities. A "shelter in place" advisory was issued, but proved ineffective because many residents were non-English speakers and were not able to get the adequate info through local media or the English only safety procedures that were announced. Chevron and county health services lacked consistence of informing the residents about the importance to "shelter in place" in order to avoid inhalation of the harmful chemicals (over 200 chemicals) that were leaking into the communities.

=== 2012 fire ===
External videos
- Animation of Fire at Chevron's Richmond Refinery, August 6, 2012 (2013). A film produced by the U.S. Chemical Safety and Hazard Investigation Board detailing the sequence of events and cause of the fire (8 mins 15 secs).

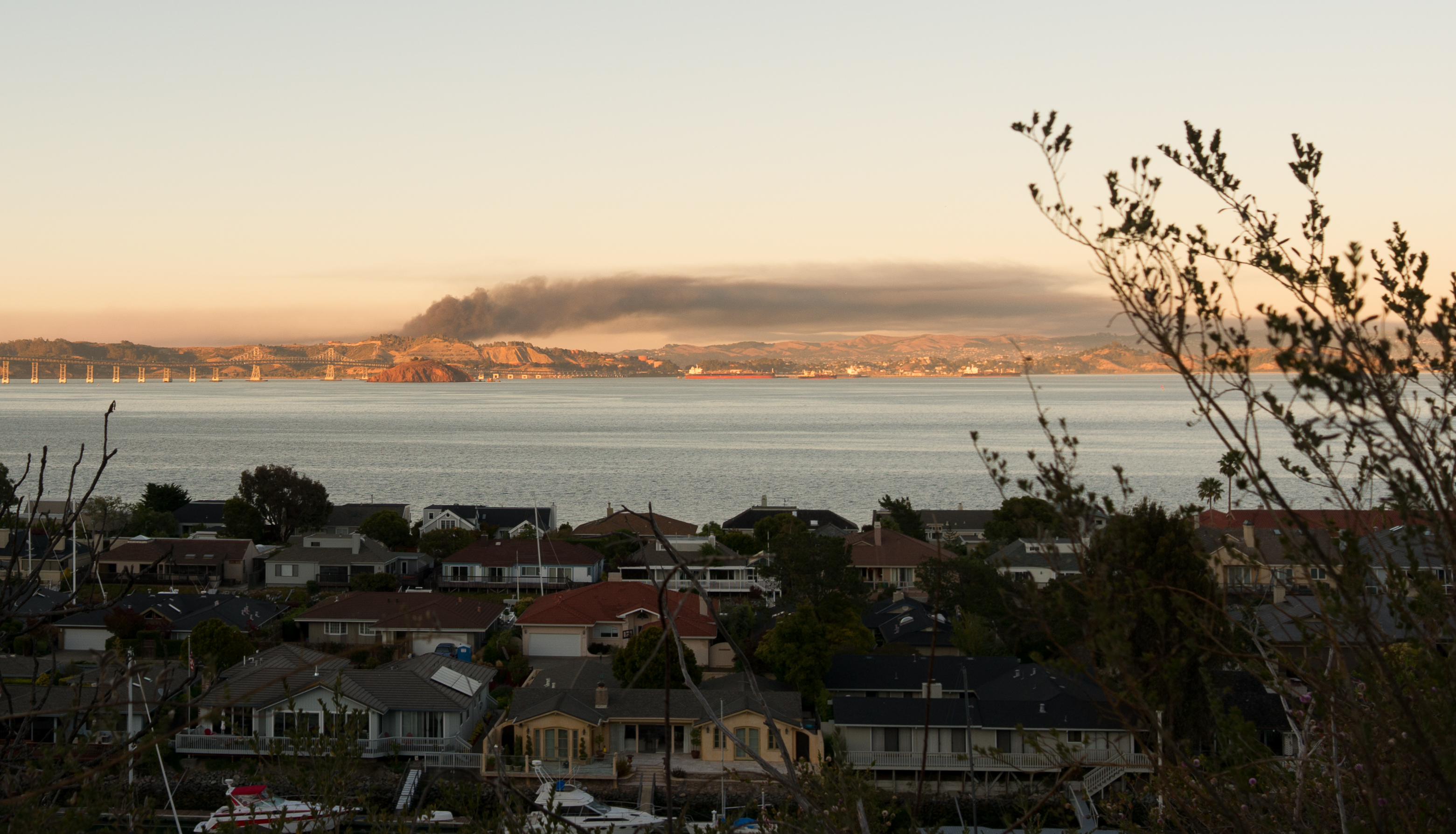
2012 fire seen from the Tiburon Peninsula

On August 6, 2012, a large fire was reported to have erupted at the refinery at about 6:15 PM. Flames were seen issuing from at least two of the refinery's towers, and a large plume of dark colored smoke covered the surrounding area. Contra Costa Health Services responded by notifying residents shelter in place. The refinery's warning sirens were quickly activated, and numerous Emergency Alert System messages were issued throughout the event, several of which were broadcast by the National Weather Service. BART shut down all local service. The fire was reported to be contained at around 10:40 PM, and the shelter-in-place order was lifted at 11:15 PM. Initial reports estimated that 11,000 people sought treatment at area hospitals, and later reports placed the number above 15,000 people.

Six employees that were present at the scene of the fire suffered varying degrees of injury. Employee 1 received a minor burn to a small area on the left ear, Employee 2 suffered a small burn to the left wrist, Employee 3 suffered from abdominal discomfort. Employee 4's respiratory pathway was irritated, Employee 5 suffered blistering to the right leg from boot wear, and Employee 6 had a bruised finger. All of the injured employees were given on site medical treatment by the Chevron Fire Department and other on site medical staff.

A refinery spokeswoman stated that the fire erupted in the number 4 crude distillation unit, or CDU. Just before 6:30 p.m., an inspection crew discovered that there was a diesel leak in a line in the CDU—and that the leak was growing. The crew evacuated the area just before the diesel ignited, said Nigel Hearne, manager of the refinery. Three refinery workers were given first aid at the refinery. On April 15, 2013, the US Chemical Safety Board released their preliminary report citing Chevron for a chronic failure to replace aging equipment and called for an overhaul of regulatory oversight of the industry to prevent such accidents from happening again. In January 2015, the CSB released their final investigation report.

Analysts predicted that the fire would cause an increase in gasoline prices in the western United States. A Chevron spokesperson later said that the fire was one factor among others, including the price of crude oil, that influenced prices. However, data collected by the California Energy Commission showed that increased production at other refineries more than made up for the Richmond loss, with 461,000 gallons of crude oil added to state refinery production during the week of August 3 through August 10, 2012.

In 2013, the company pleaded no contest to six charges in connection with the fire, and agreed to pay $2 million in fines and restitution. On the first anniversary of the fire, 210 people were arrested while marching to protest safety issues at the refinery. Around the same time the settlement was announced, the Richmond city council voted to file suit against Chevron. The reasons for the suit included "a continuation of years of neglect, lax oversight and corporate indifference to necessary safety inspection and repairs."

=== 2014 incident ===
On December 18, 2014, a flare event occurred. It was described by local television station KGO-TV channel 7 as a "large flare is producing flames".

=== 2016 incident ===
On September 3, 2016, black smoke could be seen coming from the refinery. NBC Bay Area reported that this was due to flaring.

=== 2019-20 incidents ===
KGO, a local news station, counted a total of 38 flaring incidents in 2019. Most directly related to unexpected system upsets, per Chevron spokesperson. Residents are not informed. In August 2020, KRON 4, another local news station, reported a large cloud of black smoke, visible from San Francisco.

=== 2023 incident ===
On November 27, 2023, a plume of black smoke was reported emanating from Chevron's Richmond refinery following a power outage at the facility. The smoke seen throughout the area began to billow from the facility Monday afternoon.

== Environmental record ==
=== Source of crude ===
This refinery receives small quantities (relative to their other sources) of crude oil from the Amazon region of South America, according to the Borealis Centre for Environmental and Trade Research.

=== Air quality monitoring ===
Chevron is currently implementing an Air Quality Monitoring program in the surrounding neighborhoods of North Richmond, Point Richmond and Atchison Village. This program is part of the Richmond Community Benefits Agreement (RCBA, Section 2.F(2)) for the Chevron Energy and Hydrogen Renewal Project. To add onto that, The Air Quality Monitoring Program will sample air quality using testing methods similar to those used by government agencies and publish these results on a community-accessible website.

Some citizens routinely patrol the area with air collection bins to measure the chemical content of the air.

=== Castro Cove ===
Between 1902 and 1987 the refinery released noxious chemicals into the surrounding environment with impunity. This came in the form of contaminated process water from the industrial facilities of the complex. There are unhealthy levels of polycyclic aromatic hydrocarbons (PAHs) and mercury in the estuarine habitats of Castro Cove and the San Pablo Creek Marsh adjacent to the refinery's runoff from their waste water outfall. The water is highly toxic to wildlife and is too polluted for fishing, swimming, or wading.

Since 1987 the refinery has reduced the impact of discharged process water by improving water treatment to reduce contaminants, including metals, by approximately 80 percent and reducing the amount of treated water discharged from 22 million US gallons (83,000 m^{3}) to 5.6 million US gallons (21,000 m^{3}). Additionally, in 1987 the refinery completed the deepwater discharge project moving the effluent discharge point from Castro Cove to deep water in San Pablo Bay to provide for greater dilution of remaining contaminants and minimize the impact on water quality.

In 2007 and 2008, Chevron engaged in a clean-up operation of the cove that cost between $20 and $30 million after being ordered to do so by the California Regional Water Quality Control Board's Bay Protection and Toxic Clean-up Program (which found Chevron liable for an additional $2.85 million in "natural resources damages.")

== Controversies ==
=== Tax rates ===
In 2006 a local referendum (Measure T) proposed to raise the business tax. Chevron vehemently opposed the initiative and funded a massive flyer campaign, suggesting it would lead to evictions of seniors and closing of small businesses. The measure failed by 54%. However, in 2008 the measure was revived, modified to tax only large manufacturers; it passed by 51.5%.

=== Unpaid taxes ===
In 2009 the Chevron refinery agreed to pay the city of Richmond $28 million in back utility taxes.

In 2011 Chevron unsuccessfully sued Contra Costa County for 73 million dollars claiming its property taxes were too high. The company's lawyers stated that the refinery was not worth $3 billion in 2007 and 2009 as assessed, but instead only worth $1.8 and $1.15 billion respectively. During the hearings, Gayle McLaughlin, Mayor of Richmond, stated "If Chevron wins this appeal, it will mean layoffs, major cutbacks in services and would push us virtually to the edge of bankruptcy. Cities are suffering and Chevron is making billions of dollars." Kevin Lally, attorney acting for Richmond during the appeal, stated that Chevron had manipulated data, refused to give the assessor's staff necessary information, and falsely characterized the nature of the county's assessment process, stating that Chevron's analysis was "fraught with materials that don’t satisfy evidentiary standards.” Around fifty protestors organized by the Richmond Progressive Alliance including Mayor McLaughlin and city council member Jovanka Beckles protested at the hearings, silently holding signs.

The Assessment Appeals Board eventually found against Chevron's appeal, found that the county assessor had actually undervalued Chevron's refinery, and ordered Chevron to pay an additional $26.7 million in taxes, rather than receiving the $73 million refund Chevron sought.

=== Bay Trail ===
A portion of the San Francisco Bay Trail from Point Molate through to Point San Pablo crosses oil pipelines that connect the Chevron refinery with the Richmond Long Wharf. Chevron opposed the construction of this segment of the Bay Trail, citing security concerns, and stating that post-September 11 security requirements posed an issue. Supporters of the Bay Trail along with then California Lieutenant Governor John Garamendi pushed Chevron into accepting the construction of the Bay Trail in exchange for allowing the company to renew its 30-year lease on state tidelands that lie at the site of its port. In addition, the Richmond city council passed a resolution 8-1 directing mayor Gayle McLaughlin to ask the California State Land Use Commission to persuade Chevron to permit the trail.

Chevron claimed that its total commitment in the Bay Trail amounted to $12.5 million, with $3 million being taken from Chevron's backtaxes, and $7.5 million worth of land being committed to the project. A Chevron spokesperson stated that these numbers had been arrived at using Chevron assessors. Bruce Beyaert, head of the Trails for Richmond Action Committee (and former Chevron environmental executive) disagreed with Chevron's stated figures, saying that they were heavily inflated and amounted to "smoke and mirrors." Beyaert pointed to a 2001 joint trail study finding the trail easement south of I-580 worth $280,000, not the three million dollars Chevron assessed it at. Beyaert also states that there had previously been discussions to give land north of I-580 for free under an East Bay rails to trails project, land which Chevron's internal assessors valued at $4.5 million upon agreeing to the Bay Trail's construction. The portion of the trail in question has since been completed.

=== Trade secrets ===
In September 2014, the proponents of 1st Amendment free speech have argued against the bill SB130 allowing Chevron to maintain a degree of trade secrets that was said to have a potential to compromise operational safety.

== See also ==
- SimRefinery, a 1992 video game commissioned by Chevron to simulate this refinery
- Rodeo San Francisco Refinery
- List of oil refineries
