= Jewel Lake =

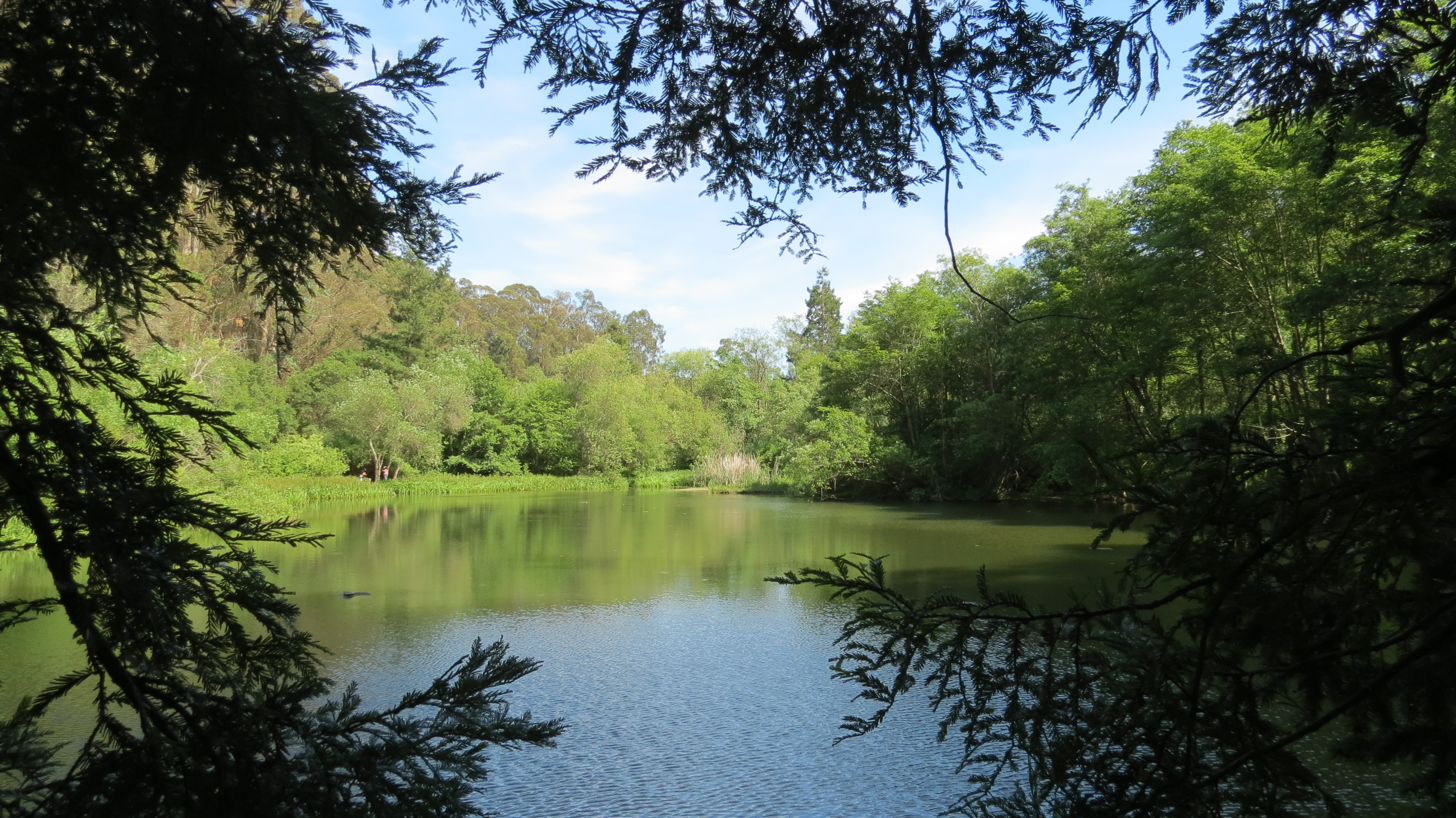

- Location within California Location within the United States
- Location: Tilden Regional Park, Contra Costa County, California
- Coordinates: 37°54′46″N 122°16′11″W
- Type: Reservoir
- Primary inflows: Wildcat Creek
- Primary outflows: Wildcat Creek
- Basin countries: United States

Jewel Lake is a former reservoir and artificial lake along Wildcat Creek, a small stream in Northern California in Tilden Regional Park. It is located in the Wildcat Canyon between the Berkeley Hills and Sobrante Ridge Hills in an unincorporated area closest to Richmond and Kensington, California geographically and Berkeley accessibly. A wooden raised walkway built in the 1970s runs over marshland to the south of the lake. The dam and abandoned flood control machinery are visible at the north end of the lake.

== See also ==
- List of lakes in California
- List of lakes in the San Francisco Bay Area
