= Richmond Long Wharf =

Major tanker terminal and port facility in Richmond, California

Coordinates: 37.9224°N 122.4103°W

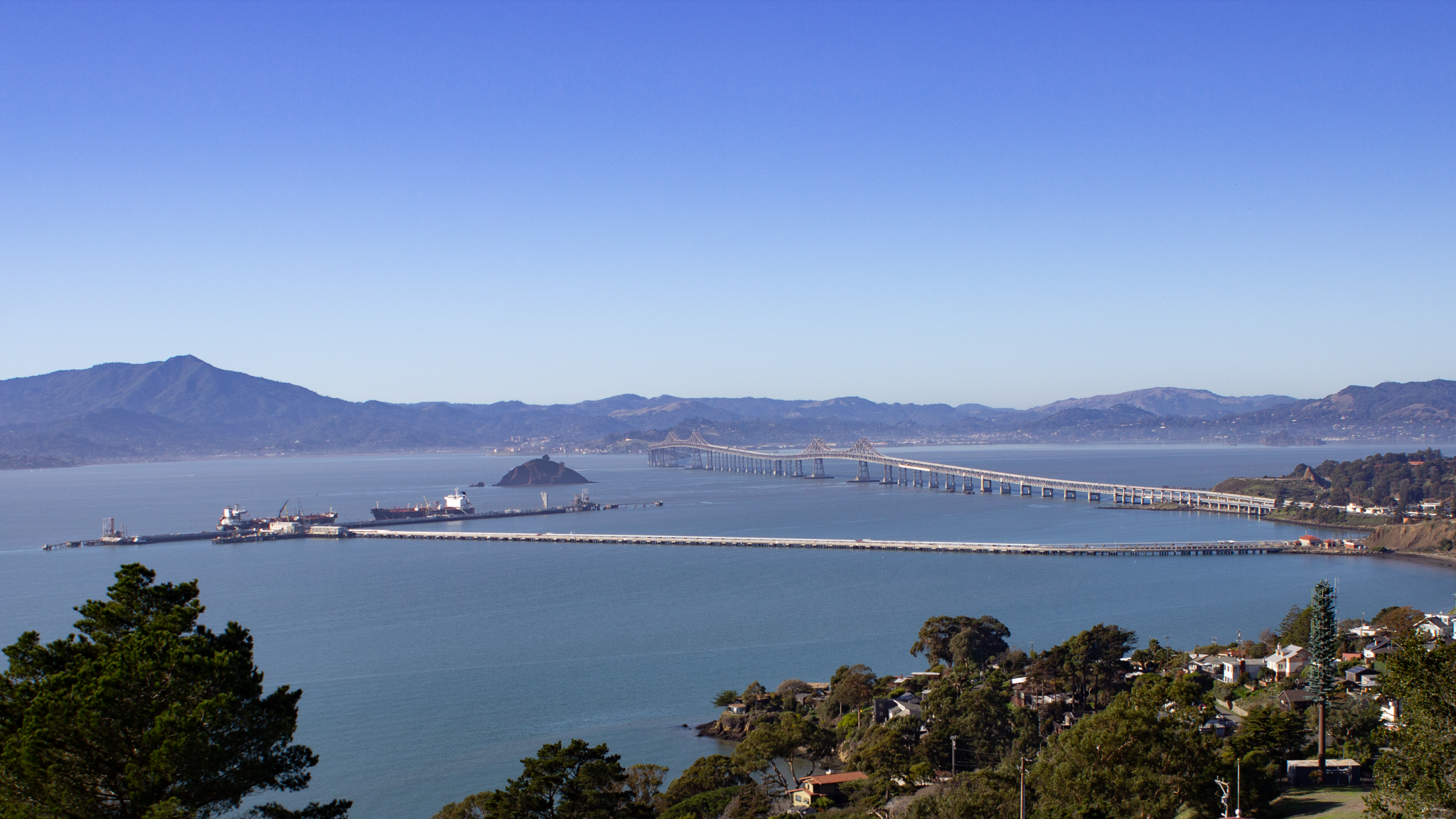
The Richmond Long Wharf, managed by Chevron Corporation

The Richmond Long Wharf is a major tanker terminal and port facility in Richmond, California.

The terminal receives petroleum, oil, byproduct and other petrochemical imports destined for the Chevron Richmond Refinery and other installations. It is located in the Point Richmond neighborhood. Chevron has cited the sensitivity of the general area in stonewalling attempts to complete the Bay Trail between Point Richmond and the Point Molate Area.
