= East Shore and Suburban Railway =

Former streetcar system around Richmond, California

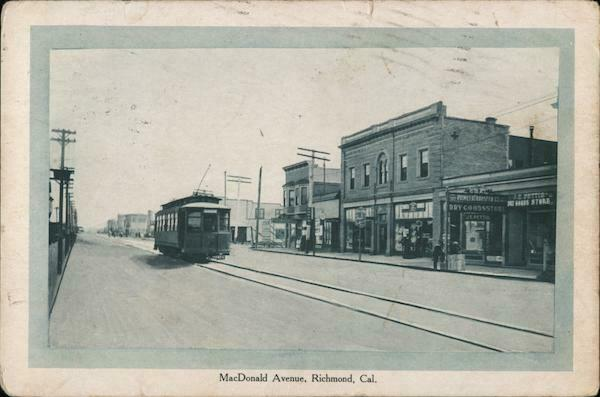
- A streetcar on Macdonald Avenue

Overview
- Owner: Key System (1912–1933)
- Locale: East Bay
- Transit type: Streetcar

Operation
- Began operation: July 28, 1904
- Ended operation: November 1933

Technical
- Track gauge: 4 ft 8 1/2 in (1,435 mm) standard gauge

The East Shore and Suburban Railway (E&SR) was a formerly independent unit of the historic San Francisco Bay Area Key System which ran streetcar trains in Richmond, California, San Pablo, and El Cerrito. There were several lines with terminals at Castro Point, North Richmond, the county line with Alameda County (a transfer point), what is now San Pablo, and Grand Canyon/East Richmond/Alvarado Park. Service to Oakland required a transfer to Oakland Traction Company trains at the County Line station and service to San Francisco required an additional transfer in Oakland. The systems were later consolidated into the Key System.

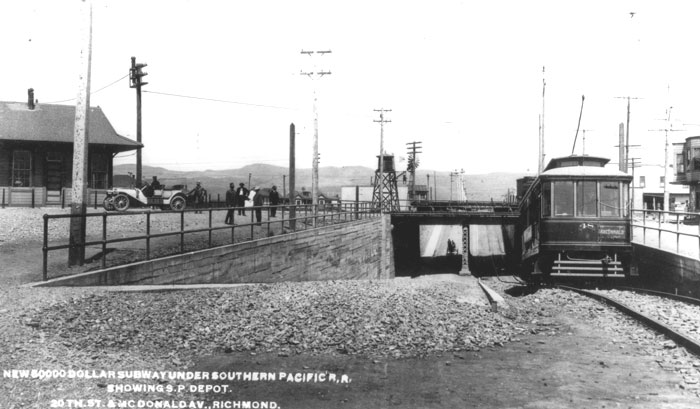
An ES&SR train passing through the "subway" under the Southern Pacific track on Macdonald Avenue.

The system's initial line was built between Castro Point and the Southern Pacific depot and opened on July 28, 1904. The extension to the Alameda County line opened on April 29, 1905, though the streetcar tracks did not directly cross the Southern Pacific main line. This forced riders to cross the tracks on foot and transfer to another car to make the complete trip. This setup would persist until April 1909 when an underpass was installed to take Macdonald Avenue under the tracks and connect the two sections of the line. The Stege branch opened in July 1905. The East Shore and Suburban was merged into the San Francisco-Oakland Terminal Railways Company along with the Key System and Oakland Traction Company in 1912, consolidating most streetcar operations in the East Bay.

Service began to be replaced by buses on August 1, 1932, with the conversion of the East Richmond/23rd Street line. Lines were converted to buses one at a time with the last done in November 1933. Fares were originally 5 cents and were raised over time to 7 cents ($1.74 in 2025) at the time of the last runs.
