= Rodeo San Francisco Refinery =

Oil refinery in California

Coordinates: 38.046042°N 122.258663°W

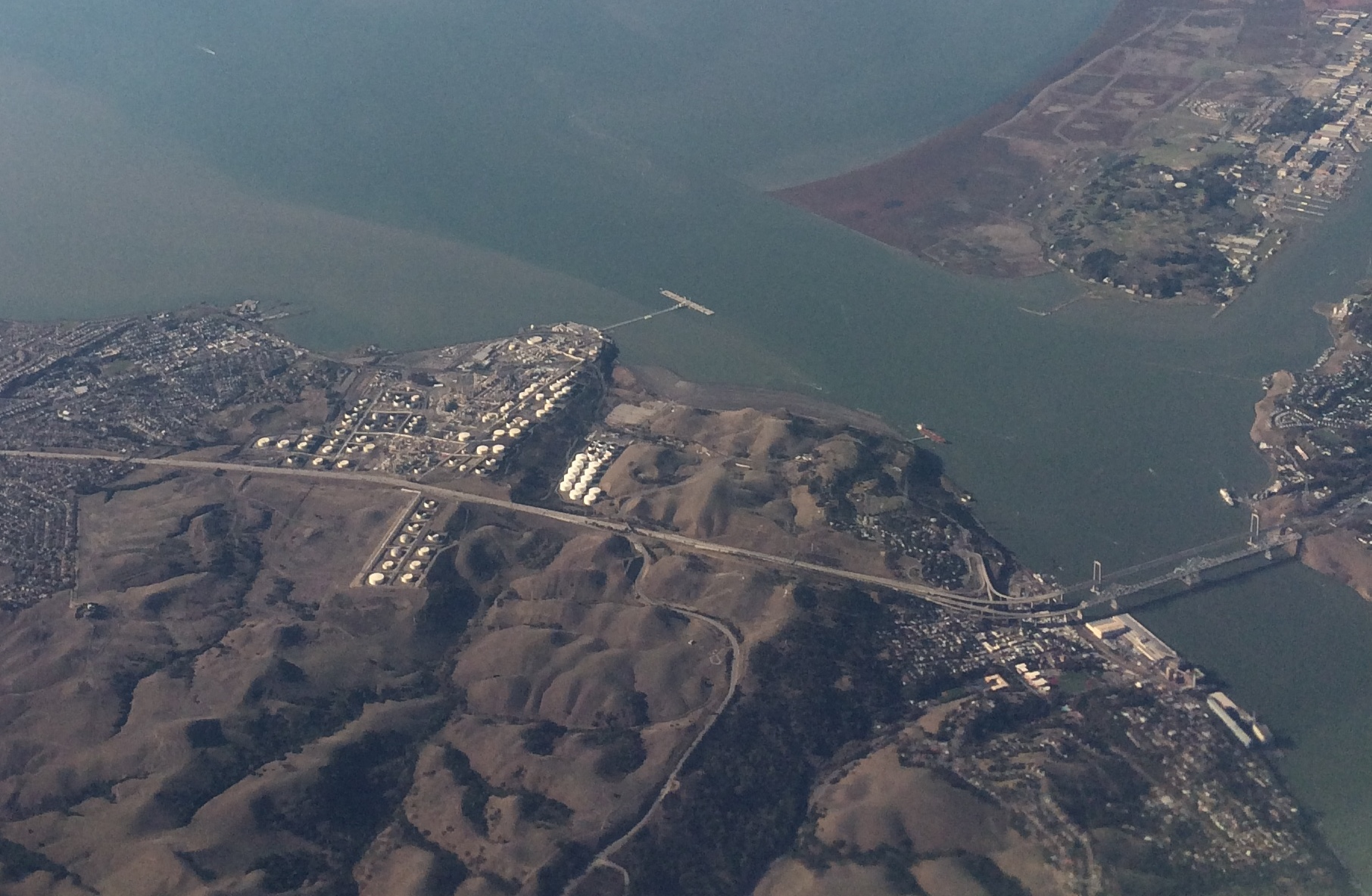
Aerial view of Rodeo facility in 2014, with Carquinez Bridge at right.

The San Francisco Refinery is an oil refinery complex located in Rodeo, California and in Arroyo Grande, California, in the San Francisco Bay Area and Santa Maria Valley. These two locations, although more than 200 miles (320 km) apart, are considered one operation. They are directly connected by a 200-mile pipeline (320 km). The refinery is owned and operated by Phillips 66, a downstream company with midstream and chemical businesses spun off from ConocoPhillips in 2012.

The complex is capable of refining 120,000 barrels (19,000 m^{3}) of crude oil per day.

== Rodeo facility ==
The Rodeo facility was built in 1896 and was the first major oil refinery in the Bay Area. The initial site was 16 acres (6.5 ha) and processed approximately 1,600 barrels per day. The facility currently covers 1,110 acres (450 ha) and has a crude feed capacity of 80,000 barrels per day, and the capacity to produce 4.3 million gallons of fuel per day.

== Santa Maria facility ==
Located on 1,780 acres (720 ha) adjacent to State Highway 1 on the Nipomo Mesa. The facility was in operation since the mid 1950s. The refinery processed approximately 44,500 barrels of crude oil per day. The facility's main operation was to convert heavy crude oil into high quality feedstock for additional processing at the connected Rodeo Facility. Additional finished products produced at the facility were petroleum coke (carbon) and sulfur.

Following an announcement in 2020, the facility ceased operations in 2023. According to a 2024 proposal from Phillips 66, the facility is slated for an eight-month demolition and a remediation period that may last up to 10 years.

== See also ==
- List of oil refineries
- Phillips 66
