= Belgum Sanitarium =

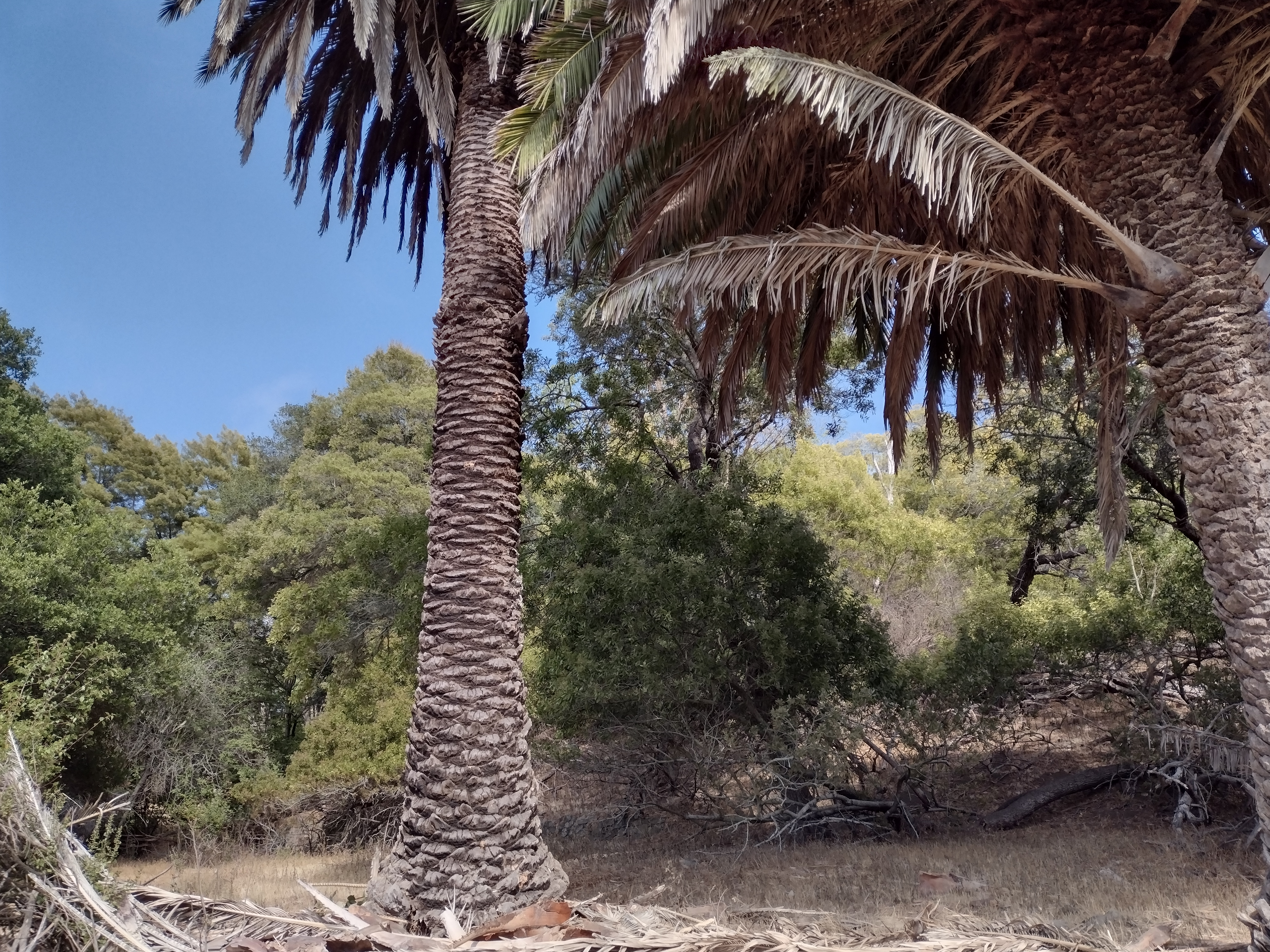
- Ruins of Belgum Sanitarium in 2021

Geography
- Location: Wildcat Canyon Regional Park, Richmond, California, United States
- Coordinates: 37.9497096°N 122.3079052°W

History
- Opened: 1915
- Closed: 1963
- Demolished: 1965

Links
- Lists: Hospitals in California

The Belgum Sanitarium, also called the Grande Vista Sanitarium, was an opulent health resort established by Hendrick Nelsen Belgum in 1914 to treat "nervous disorders" at 7010 Park Avenue in the East Richmond foothills of Northern California.

A brochure for the institution read: "To insure our guests an abundance of fresh, wholesome, nourishing food, so essential to the restoration of health, a select purebred dairy is maintained, also a poultry plan, an apiary, a fruit orchard, vegetable gardens, conservatories, private spring water system, etc.”

Originally the Mintzer family estate, on its 28 acres of land there was a laundry, a stable, and a school house, as well as electrical, pumping, and irrigation plants. In 1915 the Richmond Daily Independent reported that in "variety of shrubbery and general scenic beauty it far surpassed any residence of the county".

Belgum died of a heart attack on November 8, 1948 while defending the property against a brush fire. Afterwards his family continued to run the facility, closing it in the mid-1960's. The building was abandoned in 1963 and destroyed by arson in 1965.

A collection of Belgum's correspondence and documents was donated by the Richmond Museum of History to the UCSF Library in 2013.

Today the land is part of the Wildcat Canyon Regional Park and the former site can be found by hiking on the Belgum trail. As of 2021, the foundation, stubs of former stone walls, and a few fruit trees and palm trees are all that remain.
