= Wildcat Canyon Regional Park =

Park in California, United States

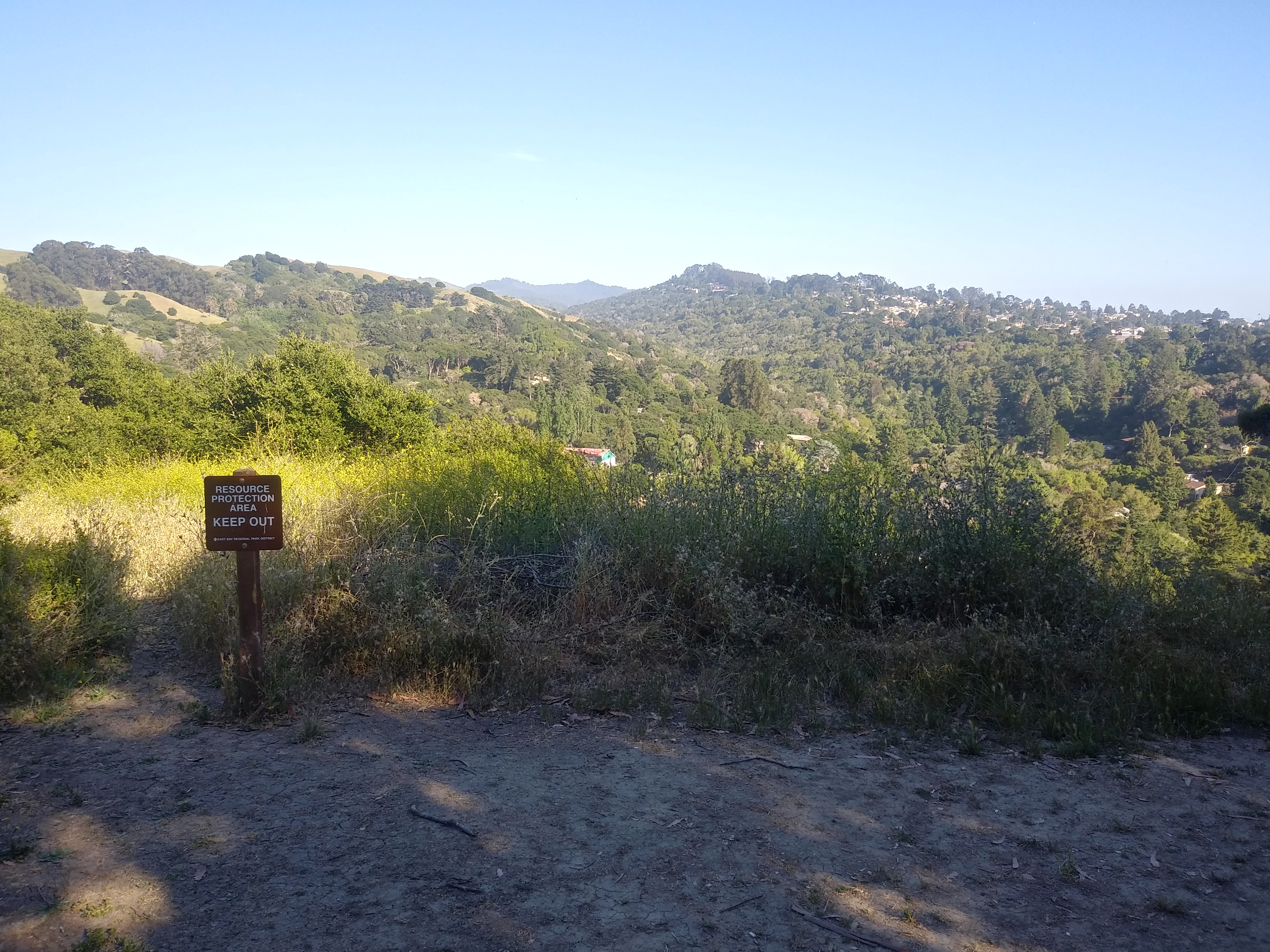
- Wildcat Canyon vistas 2019

- Location within San Francisco Bay Area Location within California Location within the United States
- Location: Contra Costa County
- Coordinates: 37°56′05″N 122°17′09″W
- Area: 2,429-acre (983 ha)
- Operator: East Bay Regional Park District

Wildcat Canyon Regional Park is a 2,789-acre (1,129 ha) East Bay Regional Park District (EBRPD) park bordering the city of Richmond in Contra Costa County in the San Francisco Bay Area of California. It includes a portion of Wildcat Canyon as well as a portion of the adjoining San Pablo Ridge, and is directly connected to the more heavily used Tilden Regional Park.

== History ==
The area was inhabited by Native Americans until 1772 when a group of "Catalan volunteers" led by Pedro Fagas and Fray Juan Crespi came across the settlement while searching for trade routes north beyond the Carquinez Strait. The Spanish settled the general area and by 1840 had parceled the land for missions and cattle raising coming into conflict with the historical communal practices of the Native Americans. Juan Jose and Victor Castro were given rights to all vacant land in the area. They kept some valuable lands and gave much of the land over to municipal authorities for water usage. In 1935, the East Bay Regional Parks District acquired the land that formed Tilden Park to the South and continued to acquire land to the north of Tilden until in 1976 it had sufficient land to form Wildcat Canyon Regional Park.

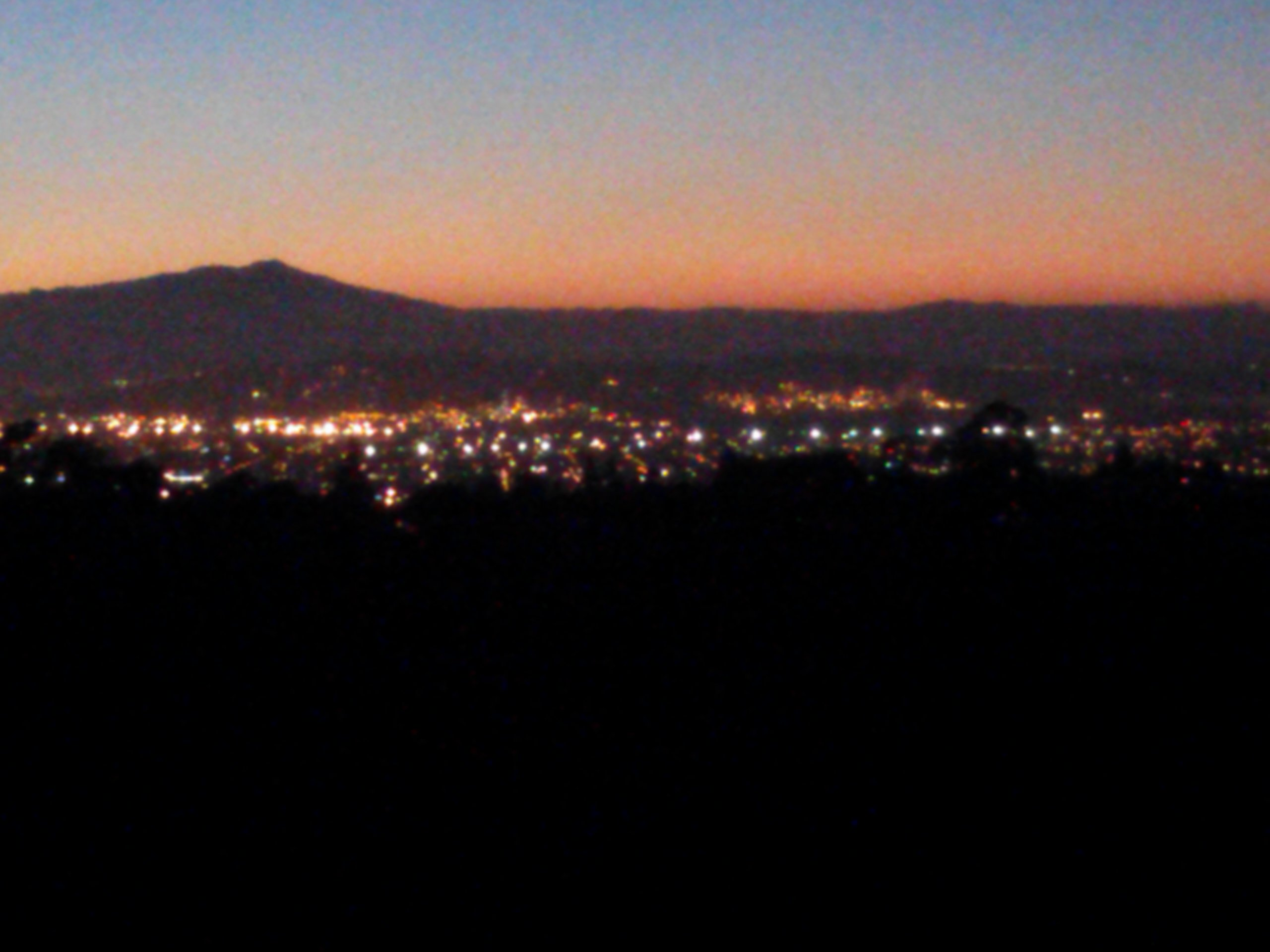
Richmond as seen from Wildcat Canyon Regional Park at dusk looking West on 14 November 2013

EBRPD announced on February 17, 2014 that it had acquired 362 acres (146 ha) of woodland on the east side of the park, which would be added to the park's existing 2,428 acres. The addition will allow easier access for visitors from El Sobrante and Richmond (via a planned trailhead and staging area on San Pablo Dam Road) and connects the park to the Kennedy Grove Regional Recreation Area and San Pablo Reservoir.

== Flora ==
In the park there are coast live oak, California bay laurel, bigleaf maple, madrone, alder, willow, dogwood, and eucalyptus trees, in addition to humid chaparrals made up of coyote brush, poison oak, elderberry, snowberry, bracken fern, and blackberry brambles.

There are some native grasses, but non-native species like rye, barley, and oat dominate, and many kinds of native flowers are also present.

== Fauna ==
Coyotes, foxes, raccoons, skunks, opossums, deer, California ground squirrels (often thought to be gophers) and voles are among the mammals found in the park.

Indigenous reptiles include gopher snakes, king snakes, western racers, garter snakes, rubber boas, and ringneck snakes.

In the skies red-tailed hawks, American kestrels, sharp shinned hawks, cooper's hawks, ravens, and turkey vultures fly, along with great horned owls and many types of songbirds.

== Major trails ==
Wildcat Creek Trail - Runs along Wildcat Creek from the Alvarado Staging Area in Richmond into Tilden Park's Nature Area. The Wildcat Park section measures 3.5 miles to the park border and continues for 1 mile to the Tilden Nature Area parking lot. The trail is wide and does not involve major elevation changes. The trail's midpoint can be accessed via Rifle Range Road Trail accessed via Rifle Range Road in El Cerrito, California.

Nimitz Way - Starting at Tilden Park's Inspiration Point, Nimitz Way (named after Admiral Chester W. Nimitz) is a mostly paved trail that connects to Wildcat Canyon Park after 1.5 miles. The Wildcat section is 2.51 miles long and connects to San Pablo Ridge Trail. Nimitz Way is a popular, relatively easy trail with views of the San Francisco Bay to the west and EBMUD's San Pablo & Briones Reservoirs and Mt. Diablo.

Belgum Trail - Accessed from Wildcat Creek Trail about 0.5 miles from the Alvarado Staging Area, it climbs quickly over a relatively short 0.85 miles to Wildcat Canyon's meadows and provides excellent views of San Francisco Bay. The ruins of the Belgum Sanitarium and the palm trees planted by its founder, Hendrick Belgum, are visible from the trail.

San Pablo Ridge Trail - Accessed from Belgum Trail or Clark-Boas Trail, which runs from the Clark Road park entrance in Richmond, the San Pablo Ridge Trail is a short 1.43 miles but climbs over three peaks. The trail connects at its southern terminus with Nimitz Way.

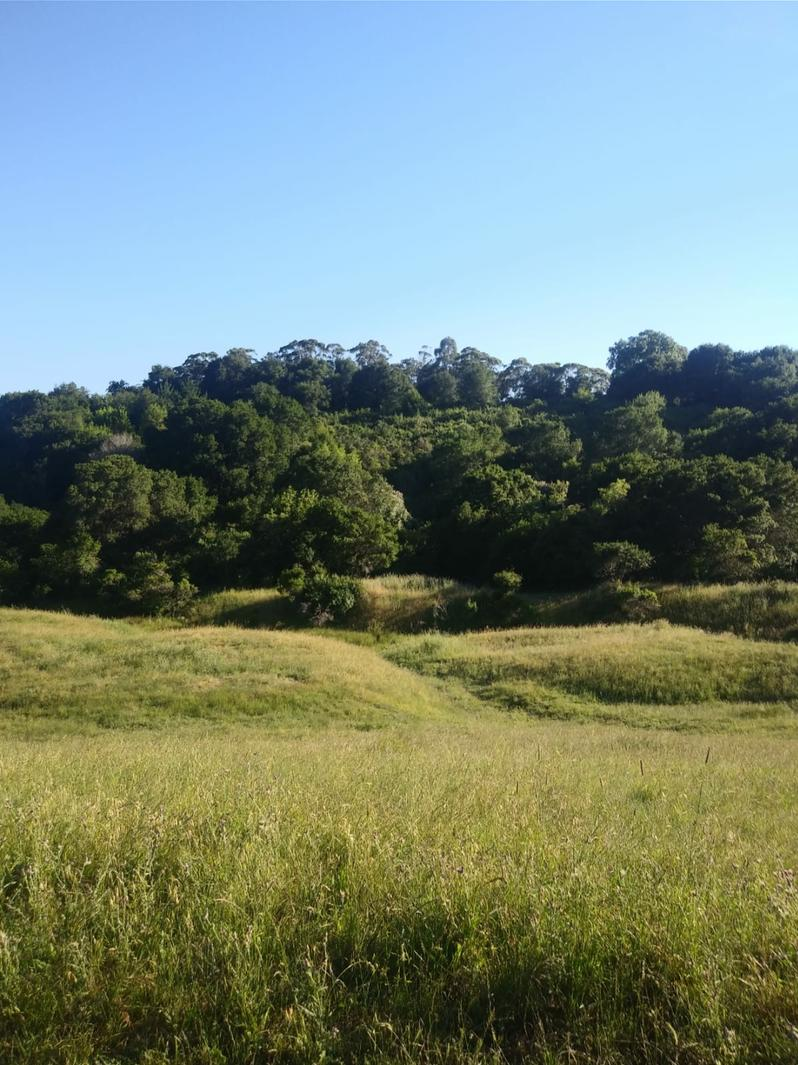
A field and woods in the park

== Other features ==
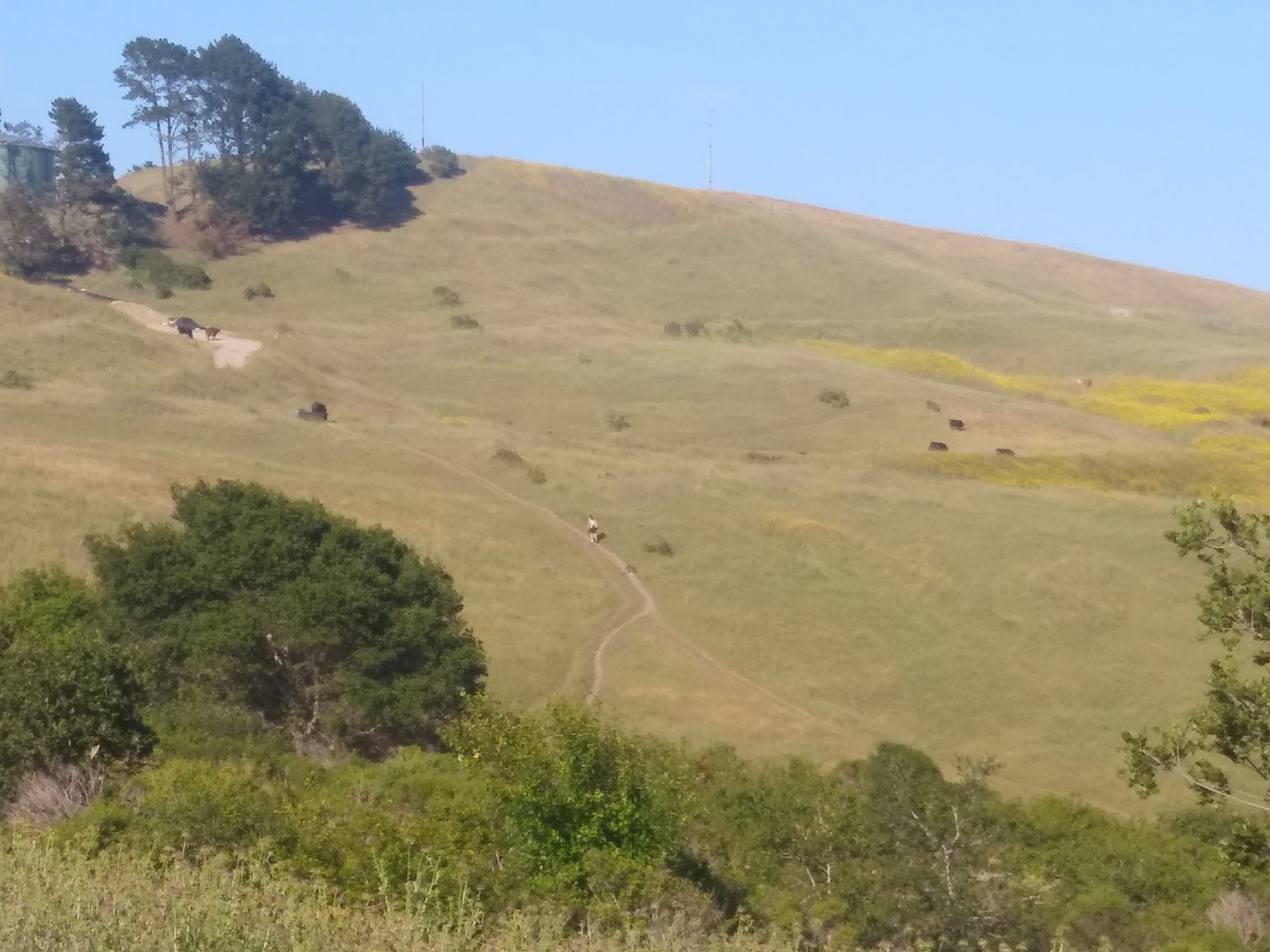
Cows and hikers on a hillside in Wildcat Canyon Regional Park

Alvarado Area, is a National Historic Place is the northernmost portion of Wildcat Canyon.

The two-mile (3.2 km) section in Wildcat Canyon Regional Park was a Nike missile base which was decommissioned in the 1970s. Today there are few signs of the missile silos and military housing that used to populate these hills.

Wildcat Canyon Regional Park hosts cattle who graze the hills of the park under a grazing program managed by the East Bay Regional Park District.

== Accessing the Park ==
The park can be accessed via the following entry points:

- The main entrance and park office is the Alvarado Area on Park Avenue in Richmond reached from McBryde Avenue.
- The Clark Road entrance in the northernmost area of the park is accessed off of San Pablo Dam Road.
- Rifle Range Road in El Cerrito
- Monte Cresta Avenue in Richmond
- Park Avenue in Richmond
