= Wildcat Canyon =

Coordinates: 37.91634°N 122.27543°W

Map of the Wildcat Canyon region and watershed

Wildcat Canyon is a narrow linear valley just east of the Berkeley Hills in the San Francisco Bay Area, situated in Contra Costa County, California. The canyon is bounded on its east side by the San Pablo Ridge, and is drained by Wildcat Creek which runs northwest to its outlet in San Pablo Bay. The Wildcat Creek watershed includes Havey Creek, Jewel Lake and Lake Anza. The latter was created by the construction of a dam in Wildcat Creek in the mid-20th century. The southern end of the canyon adjacent to the city of Berkeley was incorporated into Tilden Regional Park (where Lake Anza is located) in the 1930s and remains a major recreation area for local residents. Another regional park, Wildcat Canyon Regional Park, is situated at the northern end of the canyon.

== Wildcat Fault ==
An inactive tectonic fault, the Wildcat Fault, runs the length of the canyon and is termed as a strike-slip fault (parallel movements of tectonic plates), with around 10 kilometers of displacement, and is situated adjacent to the eastern side of Lawrence Berkeley National Laboratory. The Wildcat Fault is thought to be a secondary fault within the Hayward Fault System; however the complexity of the Berkeley hills hinders deeper understanding of its structure.

== History ==
The Wildcat Canyon region has been inhabited for the last 3,000 to 4,000 years, with villages growing along the Wildcat and San Pablo Creeks. The indigenous people to Wildcat Canyon are the Huchiun Ohlone.

By the first half of the 19th century, much of the East Bay land was distributed under Mexican-era land grants, where the fertile soil along Wildcat Creek was utilized for the development of commercial farming businesses, livestock breeding, and dairy farming in the 20th century. Due to the grassy lands encompassing the Canyon and its surrounding hills, it was chosen as the headquarters of a ranch established by San Francisco’s Mission Dolores in 1817 as an effort to sustain the needs of its growing population. Different watersheds of Wildcat Creek consisted of streams and springs that led to disputes over water rights since the creek was one of the region’s water sources until the mid-1920s. At this time, water from the Mokelumne River was introduced to water the East Bay by the East Bay Municipal Utility District (EBMUD) and put an end to the controversies. Population fluctuations around the Wildcat Canyon during the 20th century led to a 1960s development plan being cancelled, and ultimately the creation of the Wildcat Canyon Regional Park in 1976.

On September 17, 1923, a wildfire ignited in Wildcat Canyon during a period of hot, dry Diablo winds and rapidly spread to eucalyptus groves along the crest of the ridge separating the canyon from populated areas of the Berkeley Hills. Continuing into residential areas, by the next day the fire had destroyed 640 structures, including the home of architect Bernard Maybeck and many buildings he had designed.

== Wildlife ==
=== Flora ===
Wildcat Canyon is characterized by distinctions between plants that thrive on different facing hillsides. For example, bigleaf maples and madrones are typically found on east-facing hills, west and southward hills are adorned with a few native bunch grass species along with annual grass species like oat, rye, and the north-facing slopes boast wider diversity: coast live oak, bay laurel, chaparral of coyote brush, poison oak, elderberry, snowberry, blackberry, and bracken fern.

=== Fauna ===
A variety of animals inhabit the canyon including foxes, raccoons, skunks, opossums, great horned owls (by night), and deer, ground squirrels, and voles (by day).

==== Newt Migration ====
The upper watershed of Wildcat Creek spans Tilden and Wildcat Canyon Regional Parks and is an important annual breeding ground for newts. The California newt (Taricha torosa) and the rough-skinned newt (Taricha granulosa) are native to the Wildcat Canyon region. Newt migratory season aligns with winter due to the moist and rainy weather conditions. South Park Drive in Tilden Regional Park remains closed from around early November to late March or early April to facilitate the safe migration of the slow-paced newts. Such efforts have been in place since the mid-1980s to protect the now-reduced population of newts due to habitat loss.
