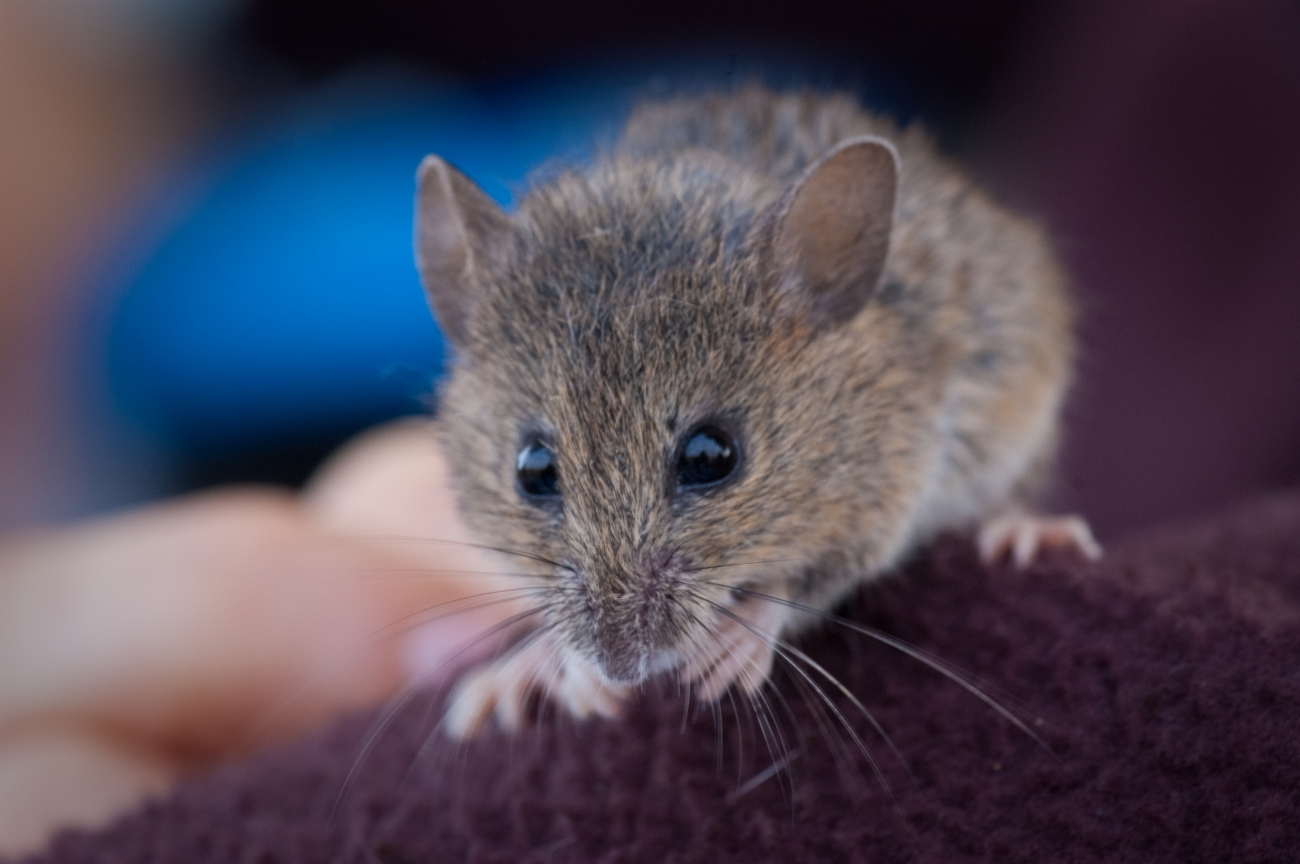

Conservation status
- Endangered (IUCN 3.1)

- Endangered (ESA)

Scientific classification
- Kingdom: Animalia
- Phylum: Chordata
- Class: Mammalia
- Order: Rodentia
- Family: Cricetidae
- Subfamily: Neotominae
- Genus: Reithrodontomys
- Species: R. raviventris

Binomial name
- Reithrodontomys raviventris Dixon, 1908

Subspecies
- R. r. raviventris; R. r. halicoetes

= Salt marsh harvest mouse =

Salt-marsh harvest mouse

Species of rodent

The salt-marsh harvest mouse (Reithrodontomys raviventris), also known as the red-bellied harvest mouse, is an endangered rodent endemic to the San Francisco Bay Area salt marshes in California.

== Taxonomy ==
The two distinct subspecies are both endangered and listed together on federal and state endangered-species lists. The northern subspecies (R. r. halicoetes) is lighter in color and inhabits the northern marshes of the bay, and the southern subspecies (R. r. raviventris) lives in the East and South Bay marshes. They are both quite similar in appearance to their congener species, the western harvest mouse (R. megalotis), to which they are not closely related. Genetic studies of the northern subspecies have revealed that the salt-marsh harvest mouse is most closely related to the plains harvest mouse (R. montanus), which occurs in the Midwest. The endangered designation of the salt-marsh harvest mouse is due to its limited range, historic decline in population and continuing threat of habitat loss due to development encroachment on the perimeter of the San Francisco Bay.

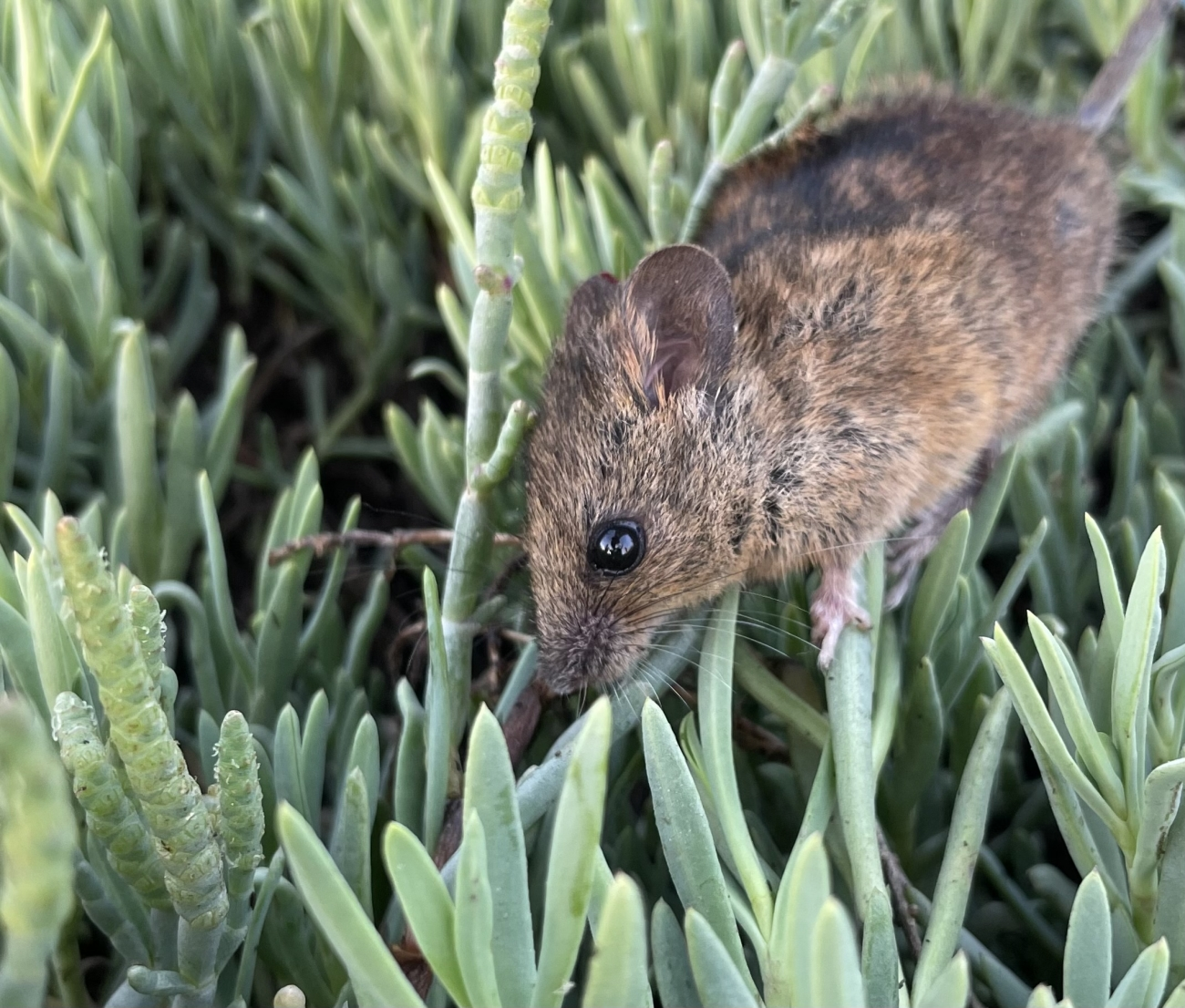
Salt marsh harvest mouse (Reithrodontomys raviventris)

== Description ==
The southern population of the salt-marsh harvest mouse tends to have dark brown fur above and a pinkish cinnamon or tawny belly; moreover, the tail is likewise bicolored. An adult's length is 5–7 centimetres (2.0–2.8 in) and a tail length of 6–10 centimetres (2.4–3.9 in). Its height is between 1.5 and 2.1 centimetres (0.59 and 0.83 in). The weight of a mature mouse is about 10–20 grams (0.35–0.71 oz). The northern subspecies is also dorsally brown or reddish brown, but the venters tend to be white or cream, and rarely with a hint of reddish; tail length is usually about 120% of the body length. The upper incisors are grooved. As a member of the Neotominae subfamily, the dental formula of R. raviventris is 1.0.0.31.0.0.3 × 2 = 16.

This species is nocturnal, with particularly noted activity on moonlit nights. This mouse is particularly resourceful, making use of ground runways of other rodents; moreover, it also exhibits climbing agility. It occupies marsh habitats where pickleweed and marsh plants abound. Its many predators include hawk, snake and owl species, as well as shorebirds and larger mammals. Predation by domestic cats is an issue due to encroachment of the limited habitat by humans at the perimeter of the San Francisco Bay.

=== Similar species ===
Similar species are the plains harvest mouse (Reithrodontomys montanus) and the fulvous harvest mouse (R. fulvescens), which has a longer tail. The species co-occurs with the similar western harvest mouse (R. megalotis), which tends to have dorsal fur that is more gray than R. raviventris and with ventral fur that is white to grayish; and the house mouse (Mus musculus), which is gray, has a scaly tail, and incisors without grooves, unlike those of the salt-marsh harvest mouse.In the summer, when salinity of water and vegetation increases, the mice have a notable advantage due to their ability to drink and survive purely on salt water. This adaptation to solely survive on salt water is unknown to many researchers and cannot be investigated due to their endangerment. It is thought that the salt marsh harvest mouse has special kidney function that allows this phenomenon. The northern species can survive purely on salt water, but prefers fresh to salt water. The southern species can survive on either, and does not display a preference. Another way to differentiate these species is based on aggression and docility. Often, the salt-marsh harvest mouse is quite docile and less easily agitated than its sister species, the western harvest mouse.

== Breeding ==
Survey data from Suisun Marsh found that the salt-marsh harvest mouse can live up to 18 months and possibly longer. Females commonly have two litters per year. The home range and habitat use of this species differ temporally across age and sex. Juveniles exhibit home ranges of 600–700 square metres (6,500–7,500 ft^{2}), whereas adults exhibit home ranges of 1,300–1,500 square metres (14,000–16,000 ft^{2}). Males and females also differ in the structural complexity of their occupied habitat during fall and summer (breeding season), but occupy the same habitat during winter and spring. While the cause is still unknown, this seasonal disparity in habitat use may be related to a reduced risk of predation and intraspecific competition in more structurally complex habitats. Furthermore, movement of R. raviventris individuals within their home ranges varies seasonally, with mean distance traveled highest in June and lowest in November.

== Distribution and habitat ==
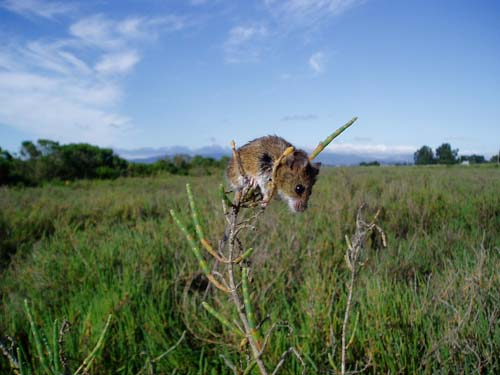
The salt-marsh harvest mouse is an endangered species endemic to the San Francisco Bay. Its salt marsh habitat could be highly impacted by sea-level rise.

This organism is known to be found in these specific locales:

- Sonoma Creek discharge area known as the Napa Sonoma Marsh
- Suisun Marsh, Solano County
- Alman Marsh, adjacent to Shollenberger Park, Petaluma
- Sausalito baylands
- San Rafael baylands
- Arrowhead Marsh in Oakland
- San Francisco Bay sloughs in Alviso
- Palo Alto baylands
- Bair Island
- Point Reyes National Seashore

== Diet ==
The mice depend heavily on vegetation cover, particularly pickleweed and tules (Schoenoplectus spp.). Pickleweed (Salicornia pacifica) is their primary and preferred habitat, as well their main food source, but R. raviventris is found in a variety of marsh habitats, including diked and tidal wetlands. In a 2019 study on the food preferences of the salt-marsh harvest mouse, it was concluded that the species has a much more flexible diet than assumed years prior. They prefer pickleweed only at specific seasonal times, showcased a strong liking for different plants that aren't native to the area, and typical foods enjoyed by waterfowl.

== Conservation ==
The salt-marsh harvest mouse has lost much of its habitat to extensive development and clearing of bayside marshland, pollution, boat activity, and commercial salt harvesting. It has been on the endangered lists since the 1970s, and has protected habitat within numerous Bay Area wildlife refuges. Individual political jurisdictions have conducted research and established habitat protection strategies to protect the salt marsh harvest mouse. For example, the city of San Rafael, California, has established a shoreline setback standard to prevent any land development within 50 feet of the shoreline; this measure has been applied to several specific land developments along the San Francisco Bay shoreline. Researchers, such as Katherine Smith of California Department of Fish and Wildlife, are at the forefront of research helping to identify how threats like climate change impact the species, while increasing the understanding of its biology, ecology, and behavior. NatureServe considers the species Critically Imperiled.

== Reference in 2009 economic stimulus debate ==
The preservation of the salt-marsh harvest mouse habitat was a subject of discussion in 2009 economic stimulus package. The mouse was mentioned numerous times in Congress by Republicans such as Rep. Mike Pence and Rep. Dan Lungren to highlight the wasteful spending of the bill. It was claimed that $30M of the 2009 economic stimulus would be spent on habitat restoration to protect the mouse. The rumor was apparently started by Michael Steel, press secretary for John Boehner. This was disputed in a San Francisco Chronicle article by Democratic Rep. Jackie Speier.
