= Alum Rock Park =

Park in San Jose, California, United States

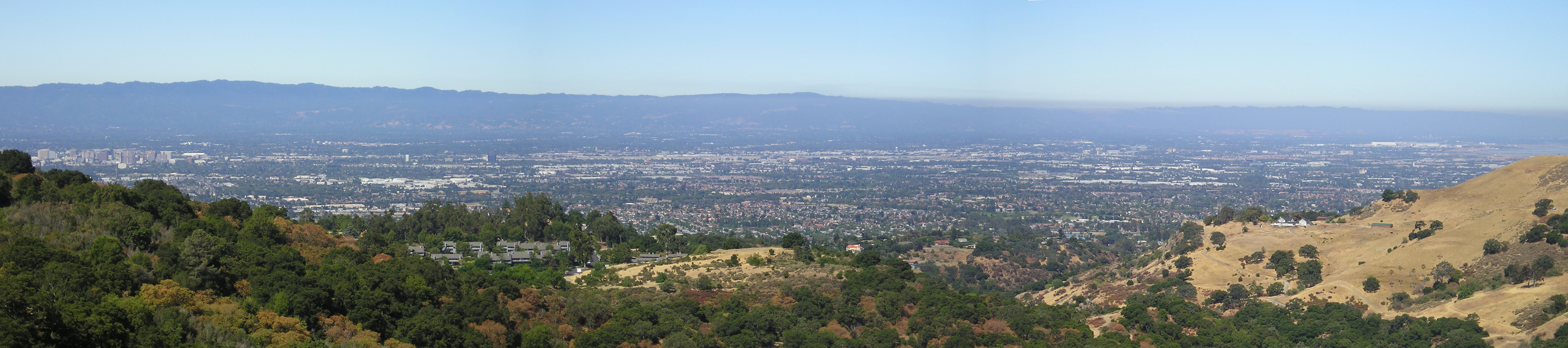
- View from South Rim Trail
- Interactive map of Alum Rock Park
- Type: Urban park
- Location: San Jose, California
- Coordinates: 37.3977168°N 121.7996751°W
- Area: 2.9 km^{2} (1.1 sq mi)
- Created: 1872
- Operator: City of San Jose
- Status: Open except non-holiday Mondays

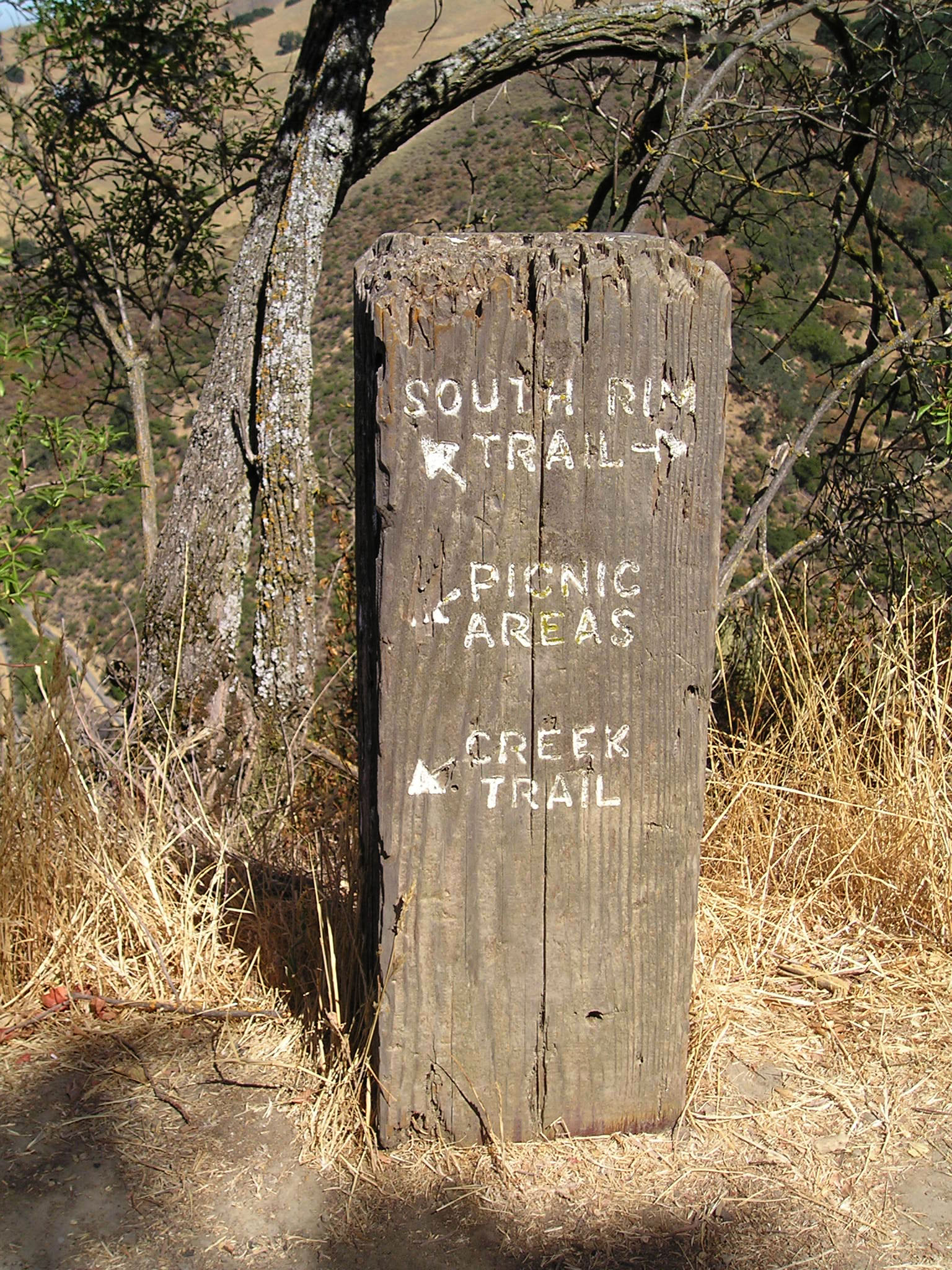
Classic carved trail sign

Alum Rock Park, in the Alum Rock district of San Jose, California, is California's oldest municipal park, established in 1872 but serving as public land since the pueblo was established in 1777. Located in a valley in the Diablo Range foothills on the east side of San Jose, the 720 acre (2.9 km^{2}) park offers 13 miles (21 km) of trails, varying from fairly level along Penitencia Creek to sharp switchbacks climbing to the ridges to the South Rim Trail and the North Rim Trail. The narrow floor of the valley includes a visitor center, a small museum/animal rehab facility, picnic areas, playgrounds, lawns, sand volleyball pits, mineral springs, lush plant life, woodlands, creek play opportunities, and occasional group camping.

The ridge trails offer views of Santa Clara Valley and of the valley in which the park is located. Some trails in the park are a part of the Bay Area Ridge Trail; the Todd Quick trail connects with the Santa Clara Valley Open Space Authority's 1,600-acre Sierra Vista Open Space Preserve.

Equestrians and mountain bikers have access to some of the park's trails, while others are reserved for hikers only. Cross-country and distance track teams from high schools around North San Jose, mainly Piedmont Hills High School, and occasionally James Lick High School and Independence High, use the park for training and for meets.

== History ==
=== Naming ===
Alum Rock Park was originally known simply as "the reservation"; it received its current name around the turn of the 20th century when thenardite-containing rocks near its entrance were mistaken for alum. Another black rock with an estimated weight of two thousand tons near the mouth of Penitencia Creek canyon was supposed to be one of the largest meteorites in the world.

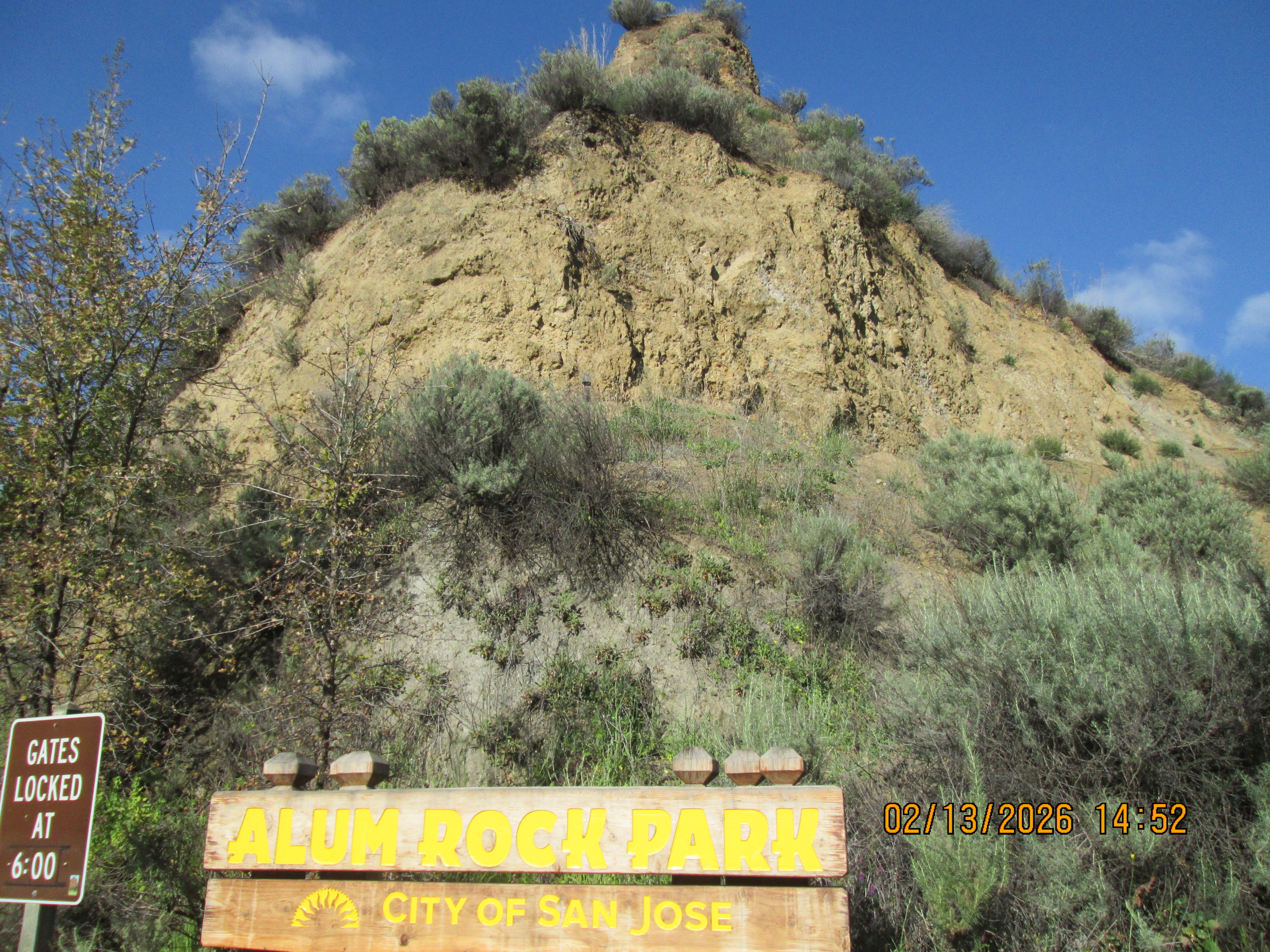
The Front Entrance to Alum Rock Park

Penitencia Creek is properly called Upper Penitencia Creek because it no longer connects with Lower Penitencia Creek, which is in Milpitas. The creek also had a different name until the early 20th century; somehow it began to be called by the name of a different creek located to the north, which was so-named because monks (possibly from Mission San José) would meditate by its waters.

=== San Jose & Alum Rock Park Railway ===
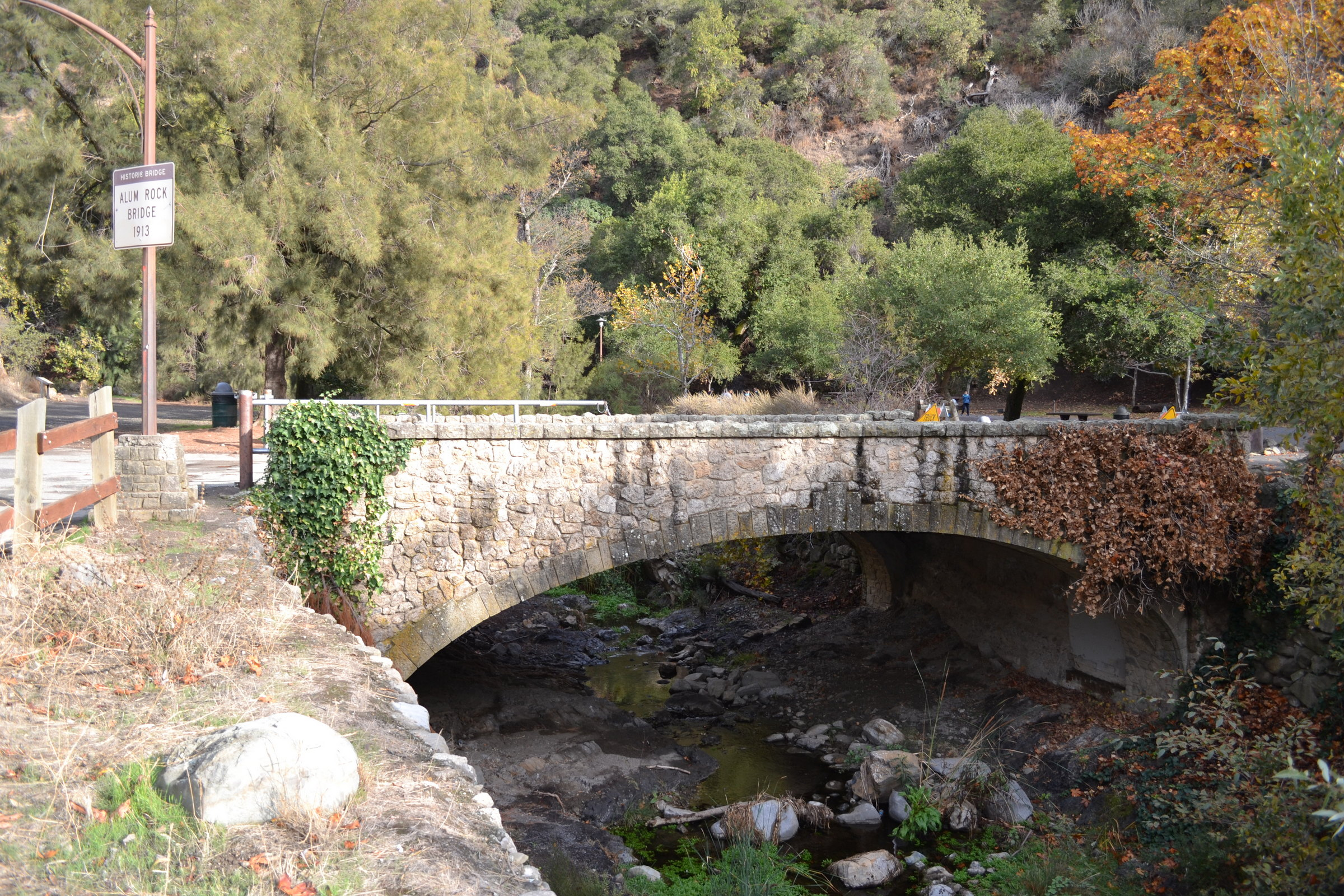
Historic Alum Rock Bridge used by the interurban park railway from 1913 to 1932

Construction of a narrow-gauge railway to the park from downtown San Jose began in 1891. In late 1891, or early 1892, a gasoline powered locomotive built by the Best Manufacturing Company arrived. This was the first internal combustion locomotive built in the western United States, though it was only a limited success and was returned to Best in 1892.

By 1896, 8 miles (13 km) of track had been completed from 26th Street up Santa Clara and Alum Rock Avenues to Kirk Avenue and thence upstream along Penitencia Creek into the park. Passengers paid 25 cents to ride to the park on street cars pulled by steam dummy locomotives. The line converted to electric power in 1901, but a storm during the winter of 1911 washed out the narrow-gauge line up Penitencia Creek. The narrow-gauge route was replaced on 2 September 1913 by the standard gauge interurban Peninsular Railway running up Berryessa Road from a connection with the downtown streetcars on 17th Street. Passengers could reach the park from any point on the San Jose streetcar system until service into the park was abandoned on 11 July 1932.

=== Renovation ===
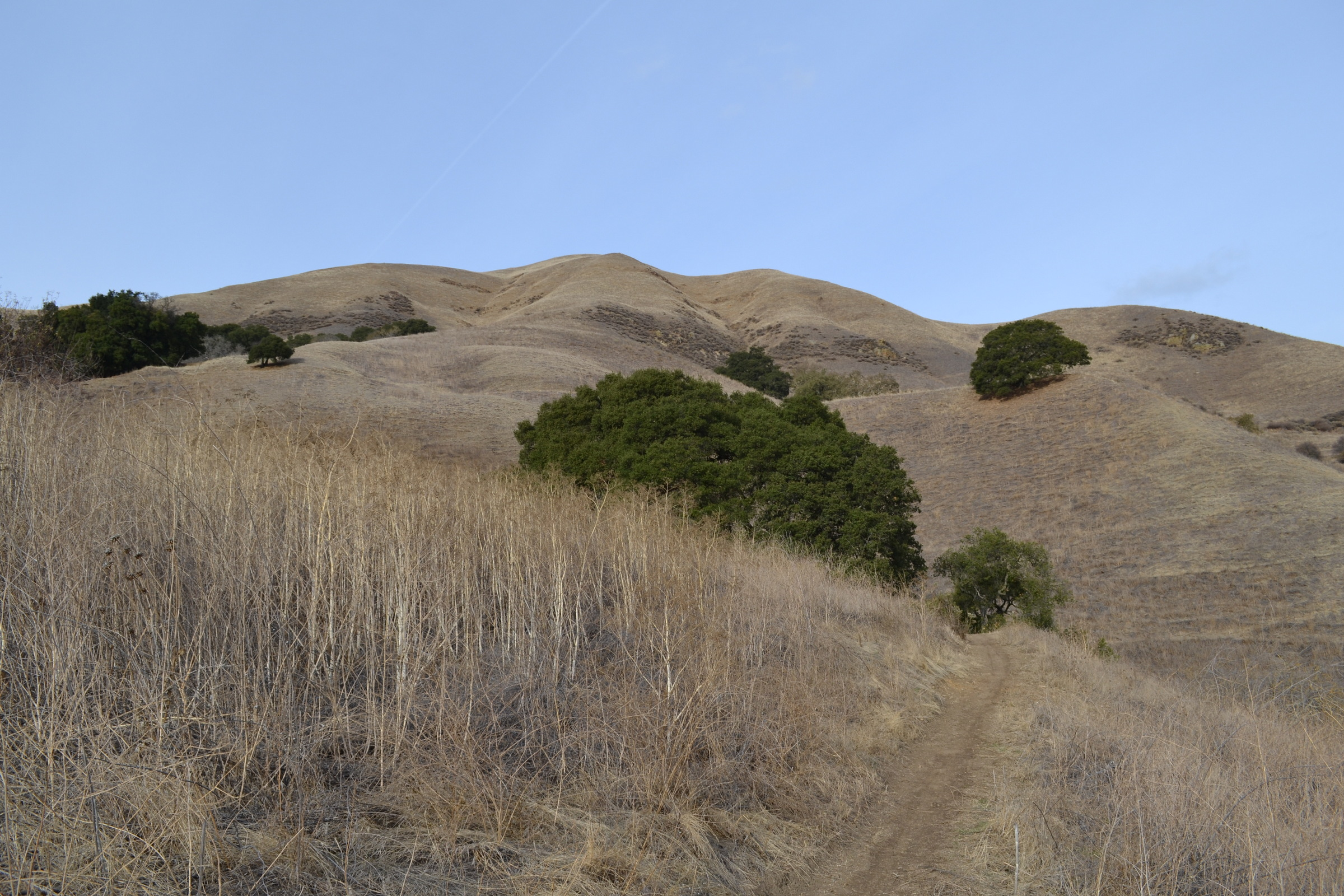
The park in the fall

From 1921 until unknown, the Santa Clara County Council of the Boy Scouts of America was given exclusive access to 15 acres (61,000 m^{2}) in the park. By the 1960s, the park attracted so many visitors from the rapidly growing Santa Clara Valley that its facilities became overburdened and the natural scenery was damaged. In the 1970s, the park removed most of the buildings, closed off parts of the park, and began emphasizing the park's natural attractions rather than its human-made ones. Much of the stonework remains, however, as do old support structures for the railroad.

=== Natural disasters ===
El Niño winter storms of February 1998 caused dozens of landslides which precipitated the complete closing of the park for nearly six months. The aftermath of several of these slides resulted in the closure of the Alum Rock Avenue vehicle entrance in the autumn of 2000; vehicle access is currently available from Penitencia Creek Road, which was re-opened to vehicle traffic at this time.

On October 30, 2007, the 2007 Alum Rock earthquake, a 5.6 earthquake, hit the Bay Area at 8:04 pm Pacific time. It was centered 5 miles (8.0 km) NNE of Alum Rock and at a depth of 5.7 miles (9.2 km). The Hayward Fault and Calaveras Fault converge close to Alum Rock Park. One effect of the earthquake was to cause a previously dried spring to begin flowing again.

On February 20, 2017, heavy rain storms caused fallen trees, landslides and flooding resulting in the park to close.

== Features ==
=== Springs ===
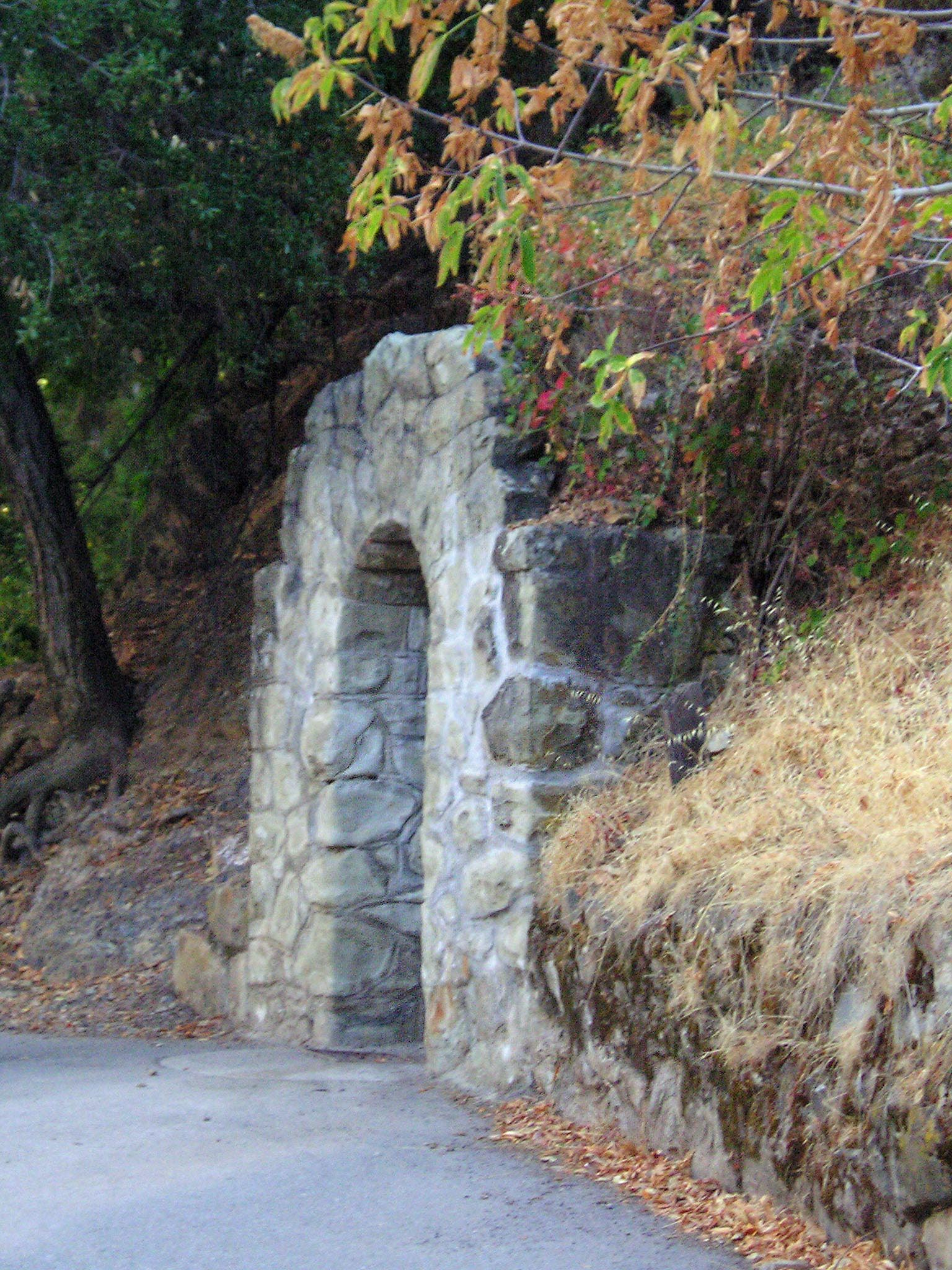
Grotto stonework around one of many mineral springs

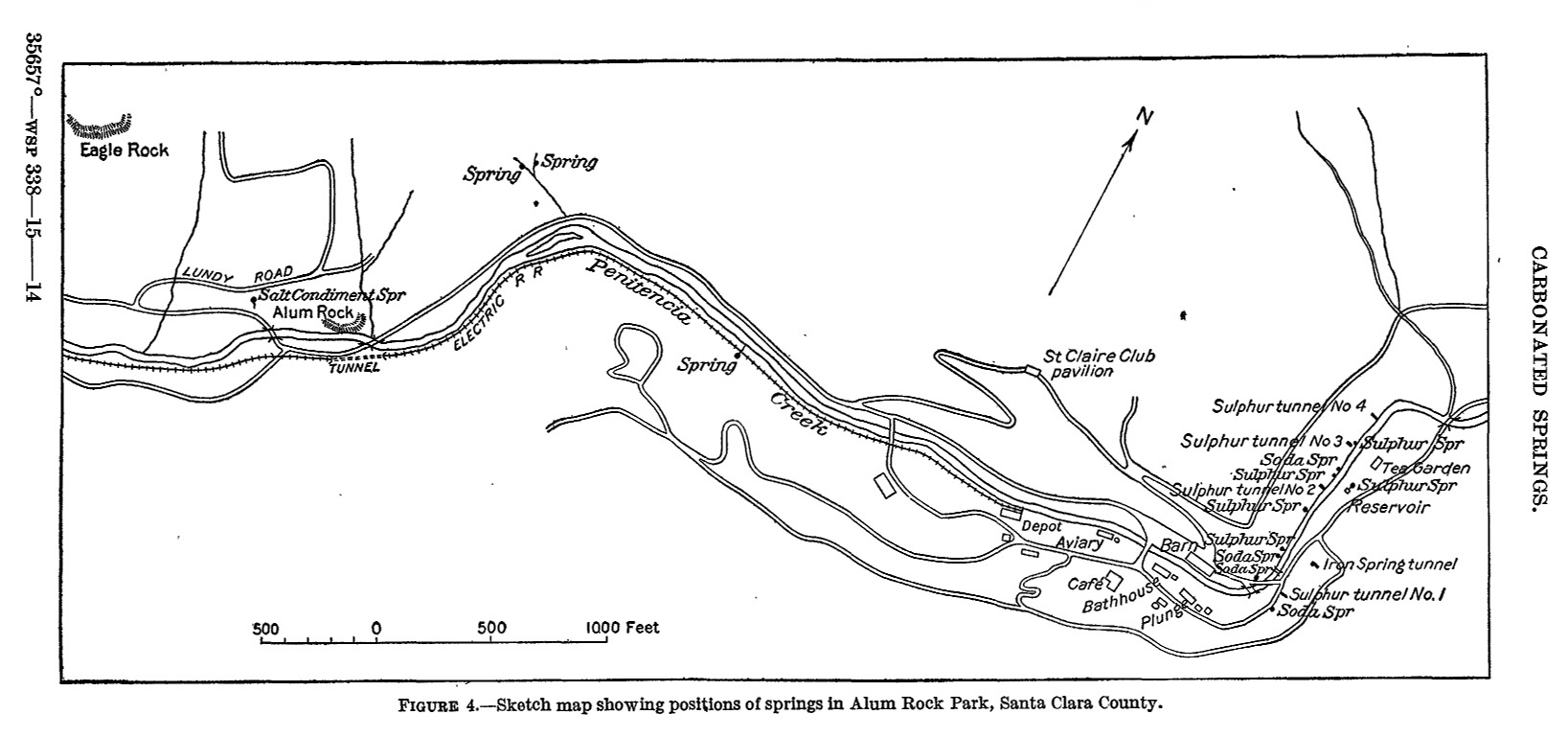
Diagram of springs and trails of Alum Rock Park in San José, California c. 1915

The valley has abundant mineral springs, which were touted as beneficial to people's health. In the late 19th century and through the 1930s, the park was famed throughout the country as a health resort advertising hot and cold sulfur, soda and magnesia springs, as well as mixtures of sulfur, soda, magnesia, arsenic, iron, and their sulfates. Plumbing routed some of these springs into bathtubs or drinking fountains. A very early 20th century advertising brochure listing the names of eleven physicians suggested: "...a remarkable spring furnishing a mixture of sulphur, magnesia, and arsenic, which has been found very beneficial in cases of rheumatism, Bright's disease, and other kidney and stomach troubles and malarial affections." Through those years and as late as the 1970s, the park featured a natatorium (a huge, indoor swimming pool filled with heated sulfur water), dozens of private heated mineral baths that visitors could rent, a restaurant, and various other buildings. Many of the springs were enclosed in stonework grottos, and stone bridges were built across the creek. Due to overuse, some of the springs became extinct, and surviving ones became very weak, producing very little output.

=== Alum Rock Falls Road ===
Private residents have access to the publicly-owned road. They enter the park and continue on to the rear parking lot. At the end of the parking lot is a metal gate which requires a security code number to continue on the public road. Visitors can also walk up the road, but there are various signs which indicate no trespassing.

=== Fork in the creek ===
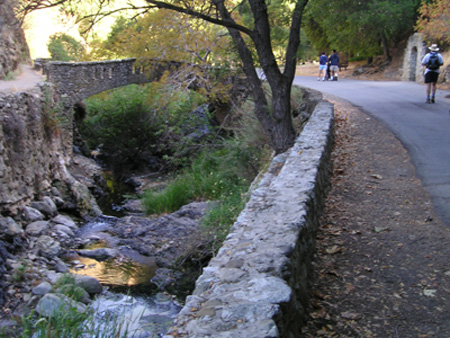
One of several bridges over Penitencia Creek

Penitencia Creek has two main sources which converge at the "horse bridge" near the uphill end of the creek trail. The fork from the north is Penitencia and originates from Cherry Flat Reservoir. Alum Rock Falls is within the park but the City of San Jose has marked this part of the park as off limits since the 1980s. The creek from the south is Arroyo Aguague and originates in Grant Ranch. Although a couple miles of this lush canyon are within the park, this area too is off limits to visitors.

=== Youth Science Institute ===
Opened in 1953, the Youth Science Institute - Alum Rock Science and Nature Center, operated by the Youth Science Institute, features natural history exhibits and a collection of live teaching animals, including several injured and non-releasable hawks and owls that are found in the region. The center offers nature and science school and group programs, after-school science and summer camp programs.

Animals that are commonly found throughout the park are displayed in the center. There is an exhibit of taxidermy birds that is sectioned off into owls, hawks, seabirds, and waterfowl. Animal remains are set up throughout the center and labeled accordingly. There is a separate room for live animals that are kept in their designated space along with a brief description of each animal. Occasionally, there is a pair of owls that roam free within the room.

== Environment ==
=== Vegetation ===
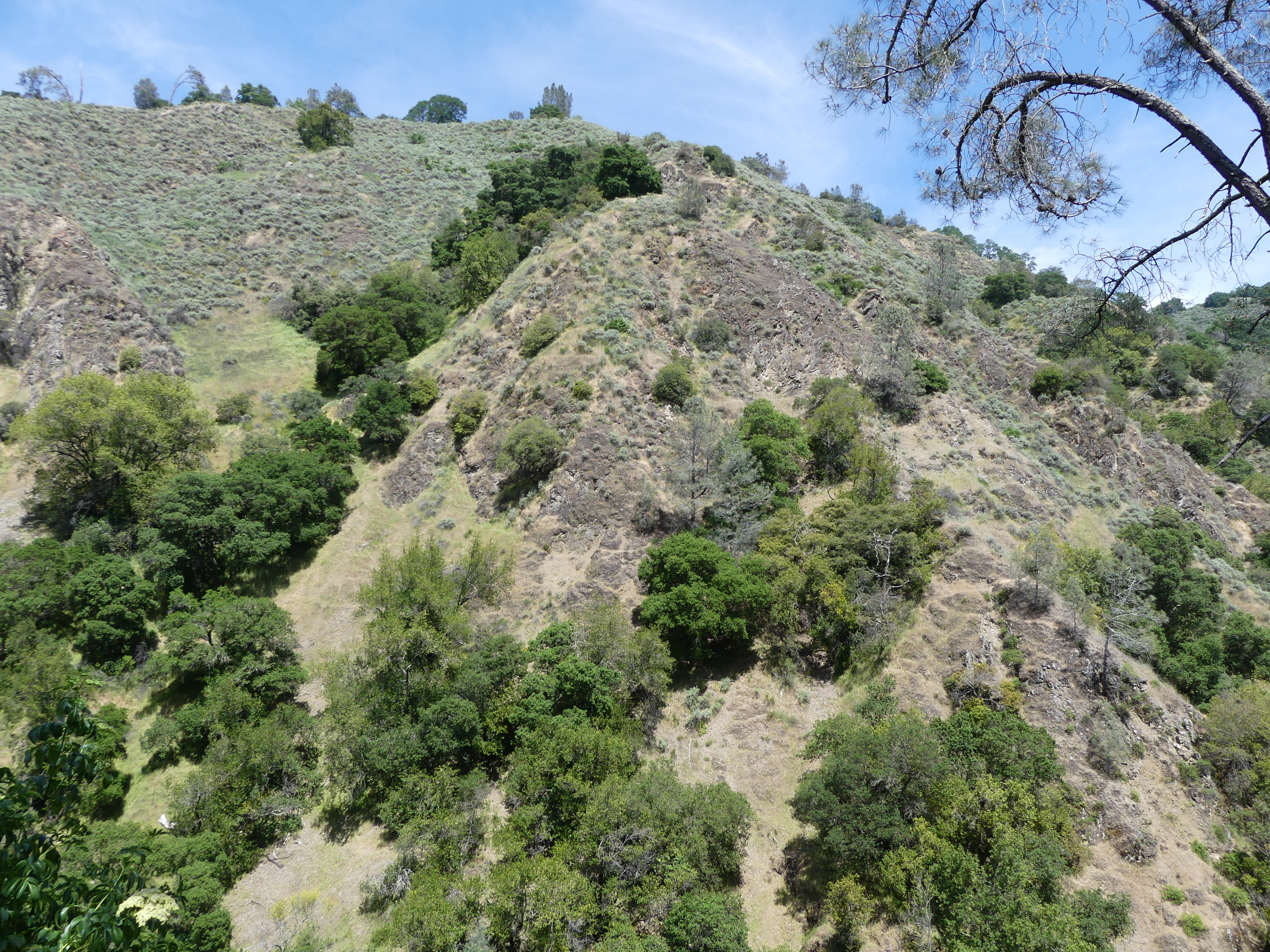
Hillside at Alum Rock Park inhabited by multiple plant communities.

The steep sides of the valley are home to many diverse plants native to California. The south-facing slopes primarily consist of grasses, poison oak, sagebrush, and occasional live oak trees. The warm sun on the sagebrush lends a unique smell to the air.

The north-facing slopes are dominated by trees, including coast live oak, California bay laurel, madrone, and California buckeye. On the valley floor, in the moist areas along Penitencia Creek, bigleaf maple, white alder, and western sycamore provide shade for the abundant ferns.

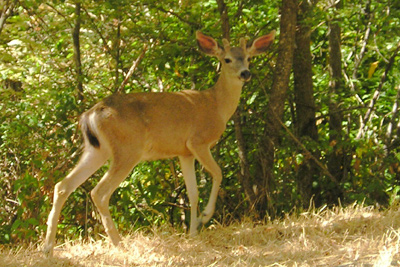
Black-tailed deer in Alum Rock Park

The most common native species of the park include California fuchsia, California wild rose, black sage, hummingbird sage, and blackberry. Problematic invasive species are star thistle, cape ivy, and periwinkle vinca.

=== Animals ===
Bird species found in the park include red-tailed hawk, red-shouldered hawk, Cooper's hawk, American kestrel, turkey vulture, wild turkey, mallard, great blue heron, green heron, Steller's jay, great egret, snowy egret, and California quail. Owls that are native to the park are the western screech owl, barn owl, great horned owl, and northern pygmy owl. The northern pygmy owl unlike most owl species is active from dawn to dusk. Larger wildlife includes black-tailed deer, gray foxes, bobcats, and the occasional mountain lions. There has been an increase in the mountain lion population in the San Francisco Bay Area. Smaller wildlife would include the darkling beetle, Eurypelma californicum (tarantula), black widow, and Pacific tree frog. Two species of lizards that are native to the park are southern alligator lizard and western fence lizard. Native fish that can be found in Penetencia Creek are the California roach and riffle sculpin.

Rattlesnakes (specifically, the northern Pacific rattlesnake: Crotalus oreganus) are known to be active during the summer months. They can occasionally be seen shading themselves in the foliage along the trails. Other snakes that are native to the park include the California kingsnake, California mountain kingsnake, Rosy boa, Pacific gopher snake, and Western yellow-bellied racer, all are harmless, nonvenomous and can also be found along the trails.

Yellow-Eyed Ensatina (Ensatina eschscholztii xanthoptica), California Slender Salamanders (Batrachoseps attenuatus), and Arboreal Salamanders (Aneides lugubris) can be found in the wooded areas of the park.

== Photo Gallery ==
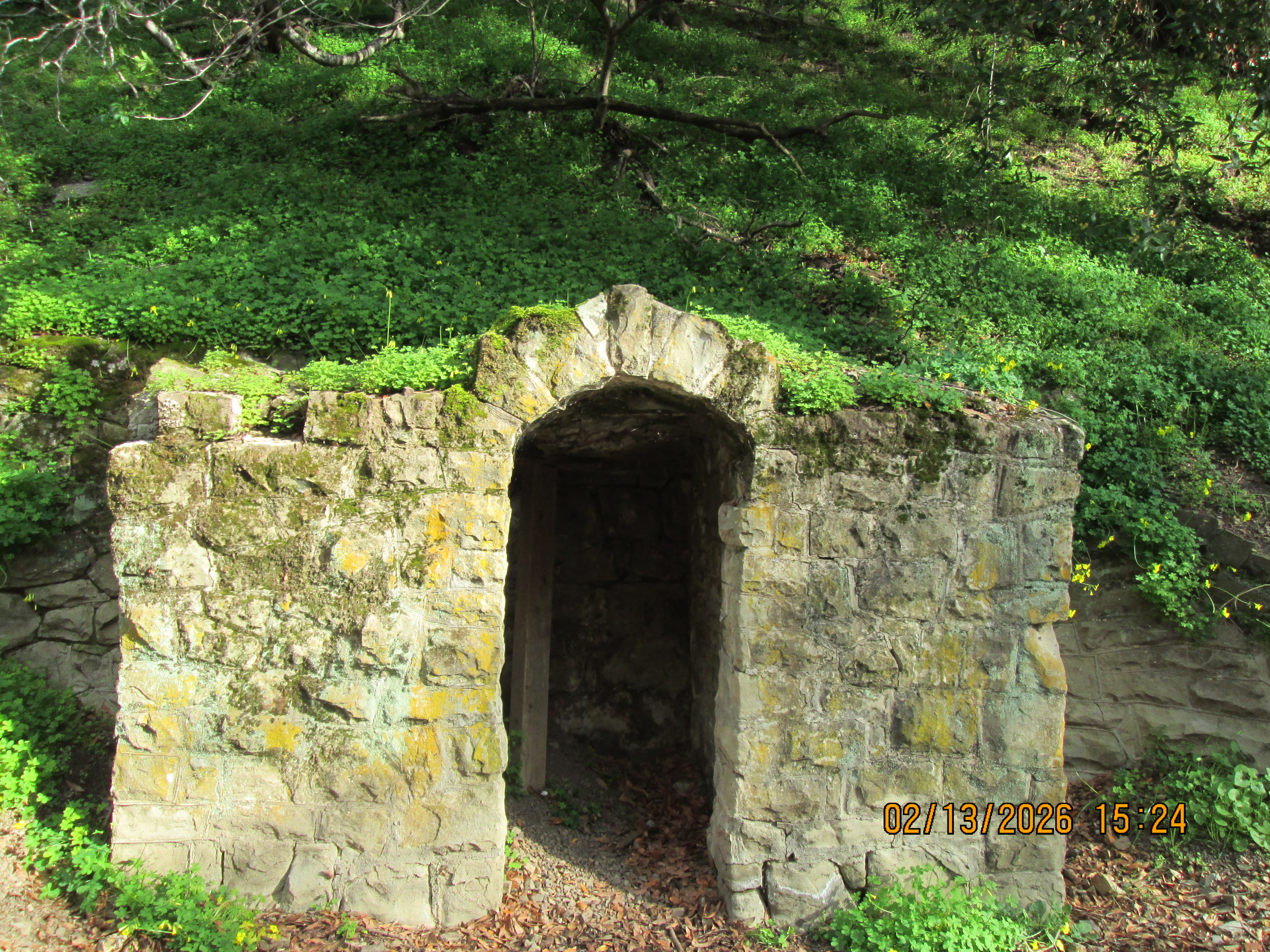
This is a defunct Grotto from Alum Rock Park. Natural spring water mixed with sulfur used to leak out. It may've stopped due to recent earthquakes or floods.

== Sources ==
- Alum Rock Park homepage
- Alum Rock Park history
- Information from the San Jose Regional Parks brochure for Alum Rock Park (revised June 2002) and from informational signs throughout the park.
