= Sierra Vista Open Space Preserve =

Nature preserve in Santa Clara County, California, U.S.

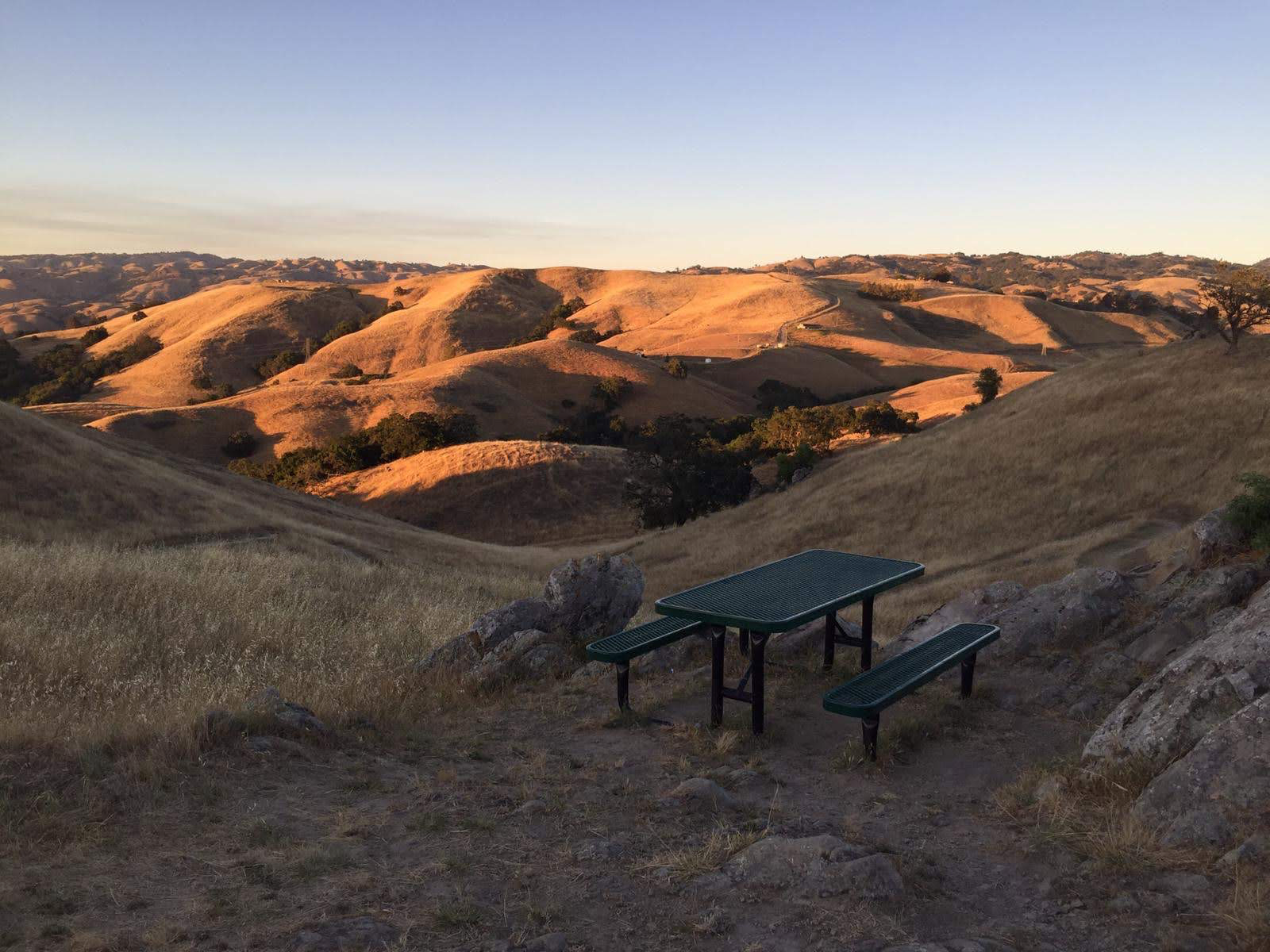
- Picnic Area along the Preserve's Aquila Loop Trail
- Interactive map of Sierra Vista Open Space Preserve
- Location: Eastern foothills of Santa Clara County, California
- Coordinates: 37.398°N 121.782°W
- Area: 1,678 acres (679 ha)
- Established: 2002
- Operator: Santa Clara Valley Open Space Authority

Sierra Vista Open Space Preserve is a 1,678-acre nature preserve in the eastern foothills of Santa Clara County, California. The preserve is managed by the Santa Clara Valley Open Space Authority and was opened to public in 2002.

The only access to the preserve had been from Alum Rock Park until 2014, when a new parking lot and trailhead opened along Sierra Road.

== Ecology ==
There are oak woodlands, chaparral, and rolling grasslands. It is home to a number of protected wildlife species, including the red-legged frog, California tiger salamander, golden eagle, mountain lion, bobcat, and grey fox.

It provides watershed protection for Penitencia Creek.

== Trails ==
There are over 10 miles of trails in the preserve. There are 6.7 miles of trail as a part of the Bay Area Ridge Trail.

The 3-mile Boccardo Loop Trail is the first trail opened by Santa Clara Valley Open Space Authority.

The 2-mile Sierra Vista Trail, connects the trails in the western preserve with the eastern preserve trail system. It is a part of the Bay Area Ridge Trail.

The 4.5-mile Calaveras Fault Trail extends from the Sierra Vista trail and Sierra Road entrance gate to the Penitencia Creek drainage.
