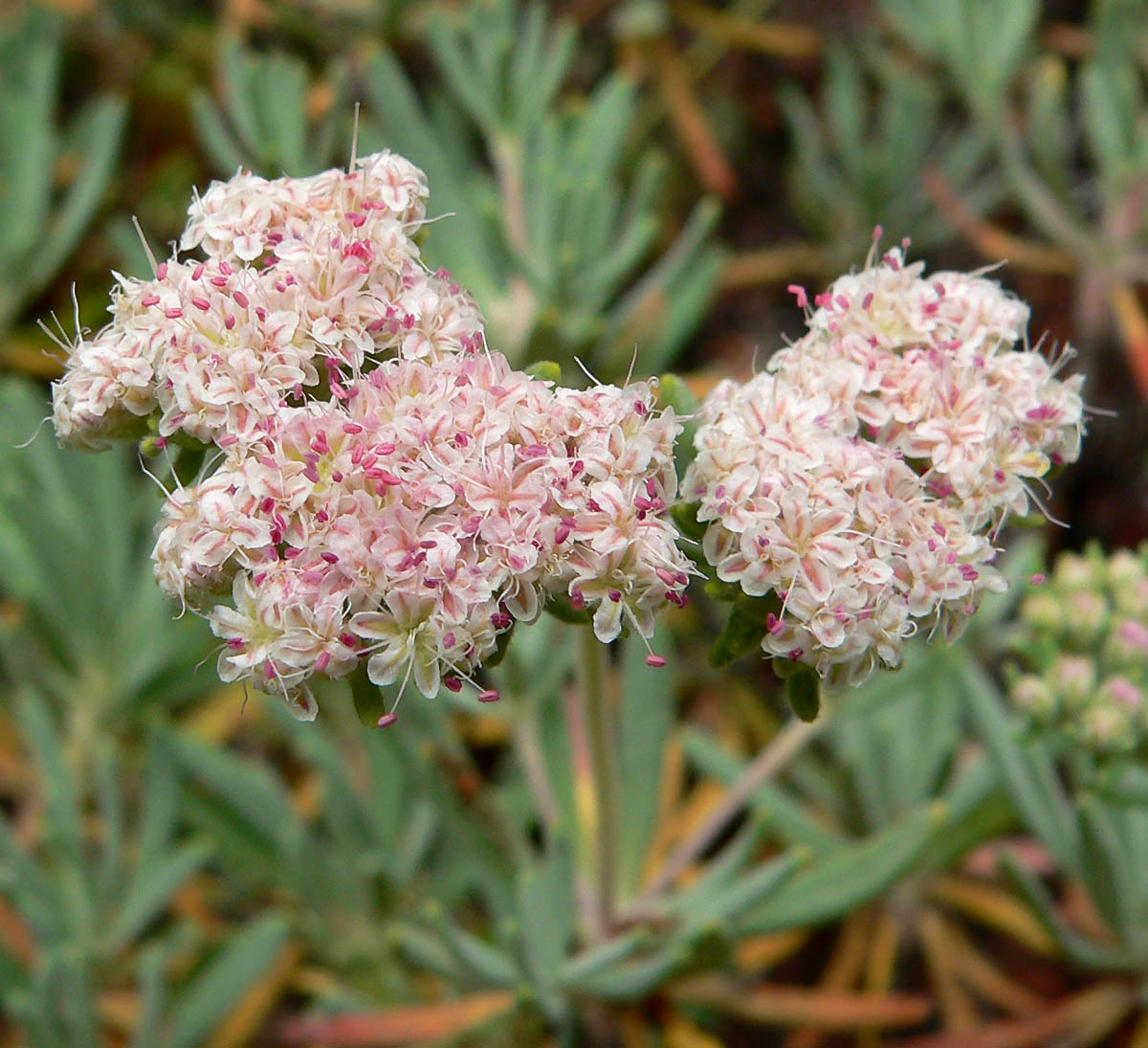

Conservation status
- Vulnerable (NatureServe)

Scientific classification
- Kingdom: Plantae
- Clade: Embryophytes
- Clade: Tracheophytes
- Clade: Angiosperms
- Clade: Eudicots
- Order: Caryophyllales
- Family: Polygonaceae
- Genus: Eriogonum
- Species: E. arborescens

Binomial name
- Eriogonum arborescens Greene

= Eriogonum arborescens =

Species of wild buckwheat

Eriogonum arborescens is a species of wild buckwheat known by the common name Santa Cruz Island buckwheat.

== Description ==
Eriogonum arborescens is a woody shrub that grows from 6–15 decimetres (2.0–4.9 ft) in height, and sprawling from 5–30 decimetres (1.6–9.8 ft) in diameter.

The stems have shreddy maroon-brown bark. They bear narrow, fuzzy green leaves at the ends of the branches, each 2 to 5 centimeters long and sometimes with edges rolled under.

The frilly inflorescences of densely clustered flowers erect on nearly naked peduncles. Each flower is only a few millimeters wide, very light pink in color, with nine protruding stamens. The bloom period is from April to October.

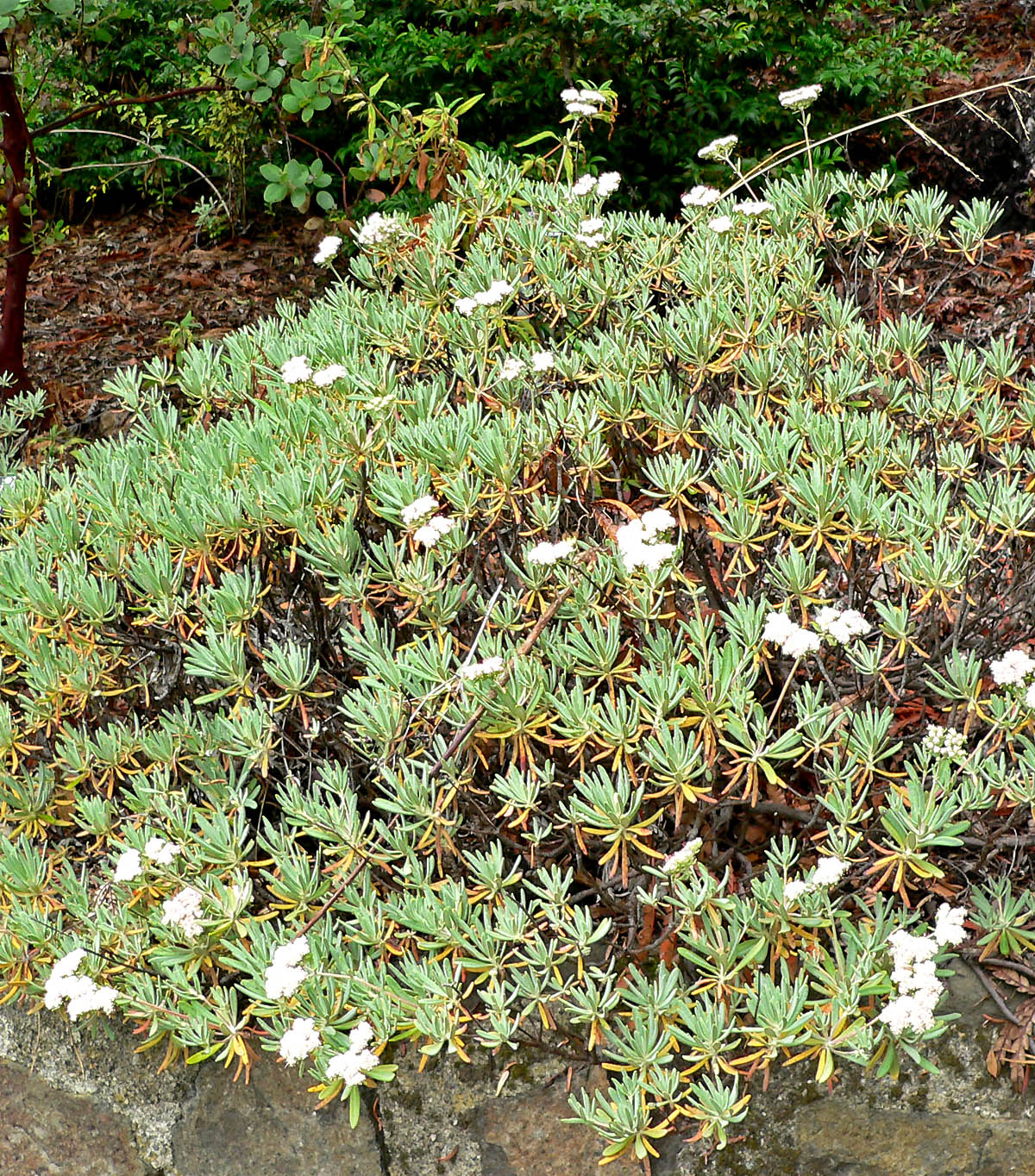
Cultivated specimen in the Regional Parks Botanic Garden, California.

== Taxonomy ==
In 1884 Edward Lee Greene scientifically described a new species which he named Eriogonum arborescens, placing it in the Eriogonum genus. It is classified in the Polygonaceae family and has no varieties or botanical synonyms.

== Distribution and habitat ==
This shrub is endemic to the northern Channel Islands of California except San Miguel Island.

It is found in coastal sage scrub and chaparral habitats, between 10–600 metres (33–1,969 ft).

== Uses ==
This species, and most buckwheats (Eriogonum sp.), are of special value to butterflies and native bees.

=== Cultivation ===
Eriogonum arborescens is cultivated as an ornamental plant, for planting in native plant, drought tolerant, and in butterfly gardens and other wildlife gardens; and for larger designed natural landscaping and habitat restoration projects.

== See also ==
- Flora of the Channel Islands of California
- Flora of the California chaparral and woodlands
