= Pitcher sage =

Pitcher sage is a common name for several plants and may refer to:

- Lepechinia
- Salvia spathacea, native to southern and central California
