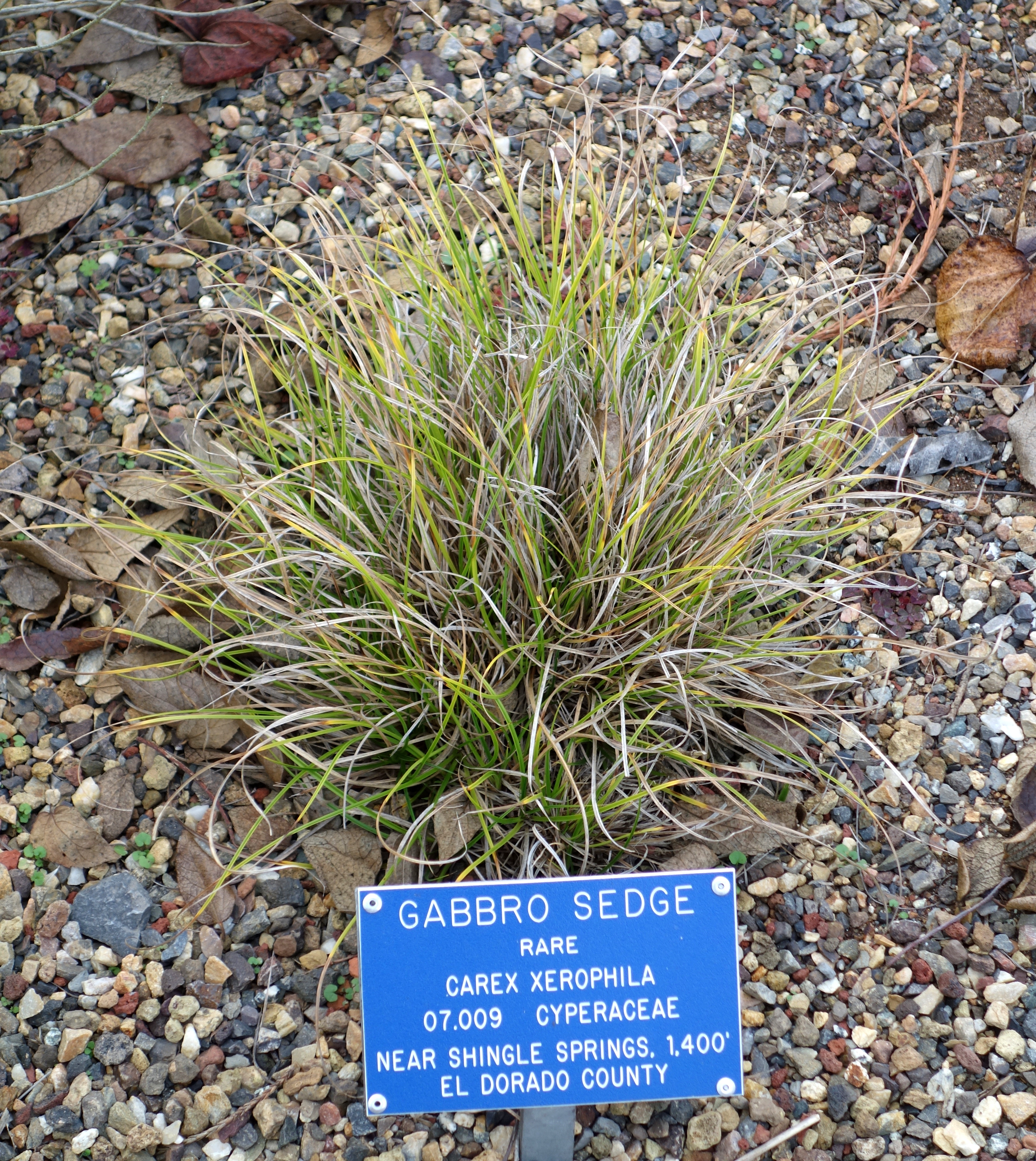
- At the Regional Parks Botanic Garden, labeled as gabbro sedge

Scientific classification
- Kingdom: Plantae
- Clade: Tracheophytes
- Clade: Angiosperms
- Clade: Monocots
- Clade: Commelinids
- Order: Poales
- Family: Cyperaceae
- Genus: Carex
- Species: C. xerophila

Binomial name
- Carex xerophila Janeway & Zika

= Carex xerophila =

Species of plant

Carex xerophila, the chaparral sedge, is a species of flowering plant in the family Cyperaceae, native to central California. It is a specialist on gabbro and serpentine soils.
