= Cape ivy =

Cape ivy or German ivy or parlor ivy or Italian ivy is probably:

- Delairea odorata also known as Senecio mikanioides

but might also be:

- Senecio macroglossus also known as Natal ivy or waxvine
- Senecio angulatus (in Australia)
