= Regional Parks Botanic Garden =

Botanical garden in California

Coordinates: 37.8933°N 122.2436°W

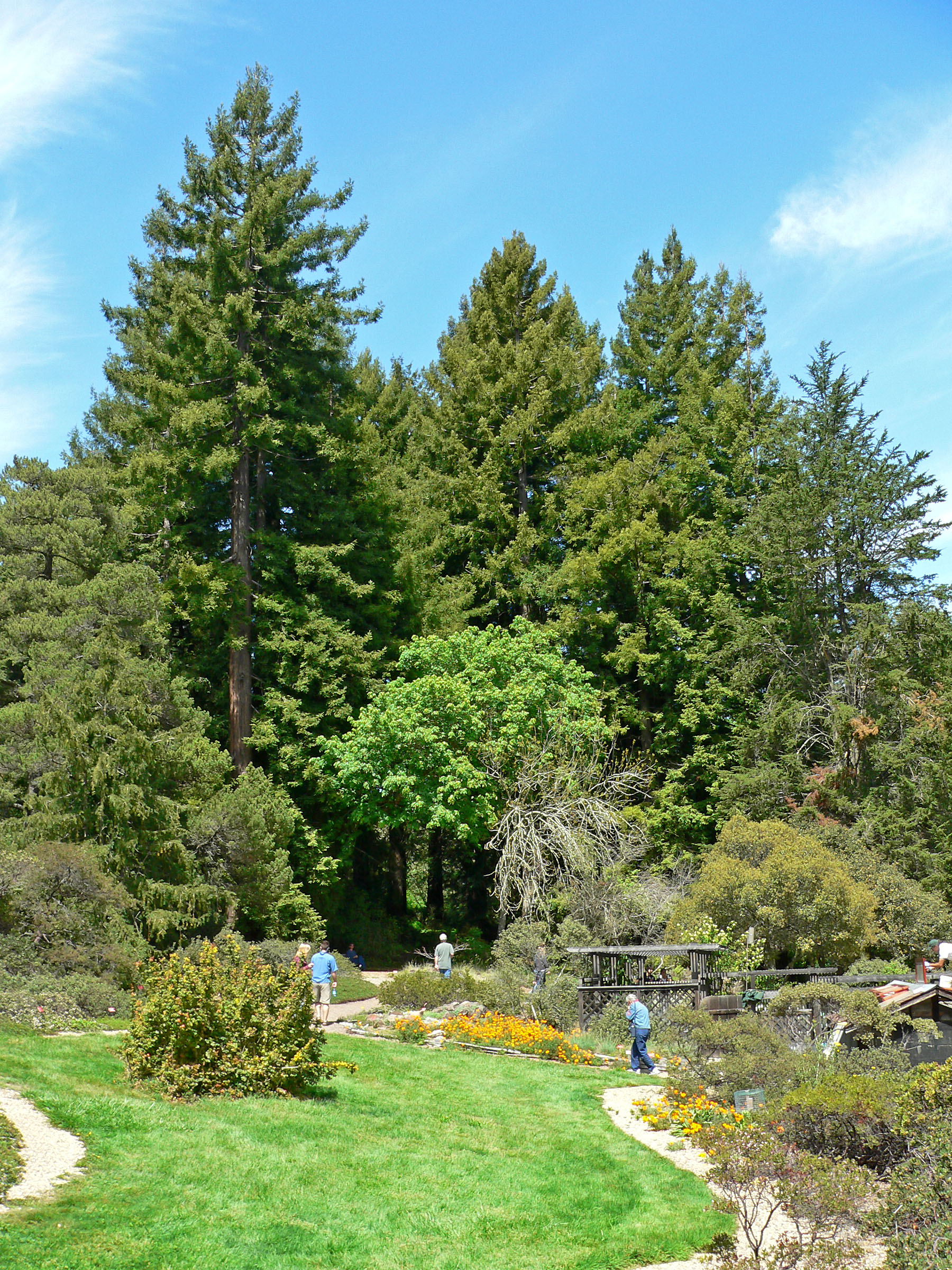
Redwoods shading the forest area of the garden.

The Regional Parks Botanic Garden is a 10-acre (4 hectare) botanical garden located in Tilden Regional Park in the Berkeley Hills, east of Berkeley, California, in the United States. It showcases California native plants, and is open to the public. The garden was founded on January 1, 1940.

== Specimens ==
Selected locations in and near Tilden Regional Park
- Points of interest
- Nearby parks and museums
1 Tilden Little Farm
2 Tilden Park Merry-Go-Round
3 Inspiration Point
4 Lake Anza
5 Brazilian Room
6 Regional Parks Botanic Garden
7 Tilden Park Golf Course
8 Redwood Valley Railway
9 Blake Garden
10 Indian Rock Park
11 Berkeley Rose Garden
12 Lawrence Hall of Science
13 San Pablo Reservoir

Notable specimens include nearly all the state's conifers and oaks, a very good collection of wild lilacs (Ceanothus species), perhaps the most complete collection of California manzanitas anywhere, expanding collections of Californian native bunchgrasses and aquatics, and representatives of some 300 rare and endangered vascular taxa of California. The garden is organized into sections, each representing a distinctive natural area in California:

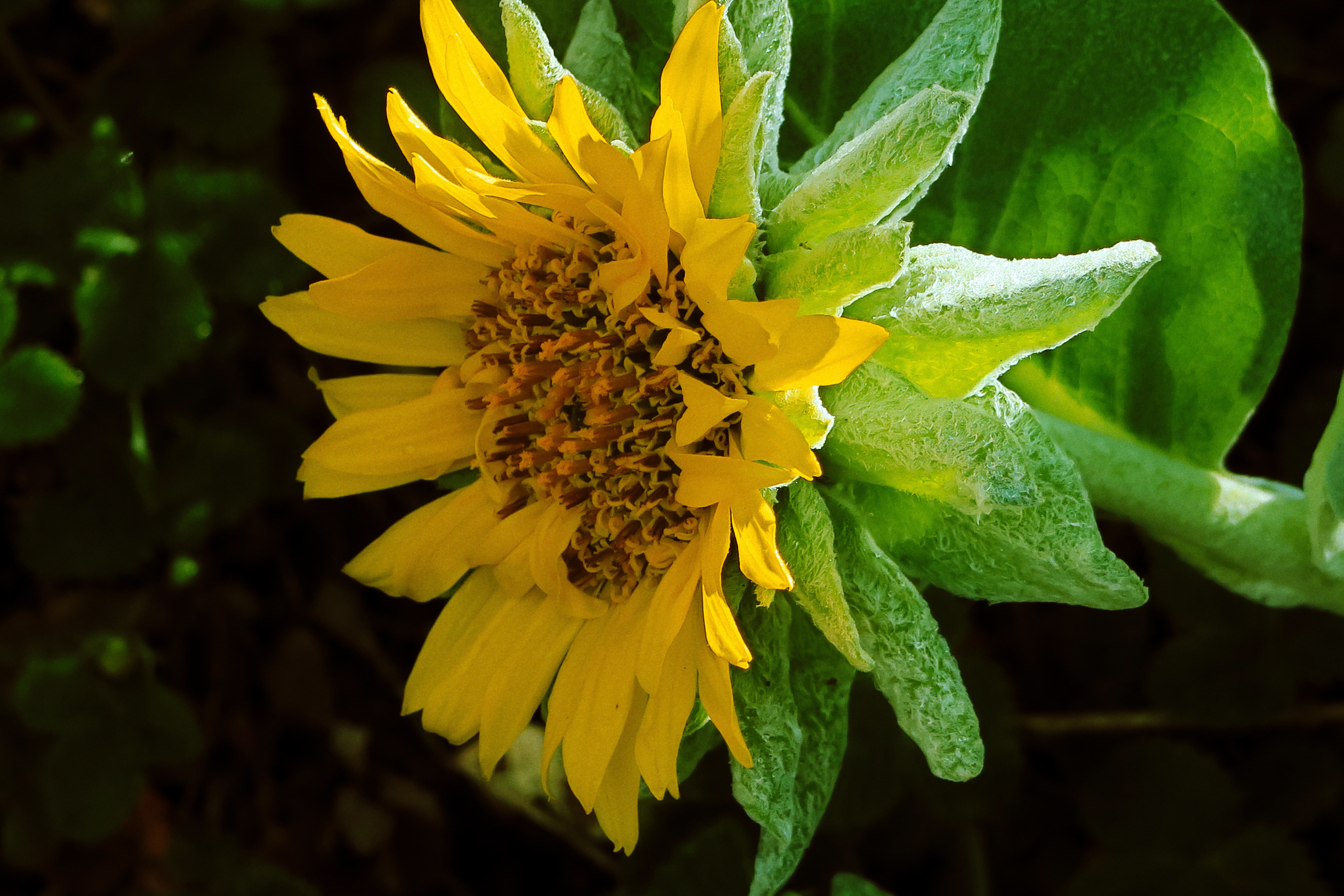
Wyethia helenioides, gray mule's ears, in the garden

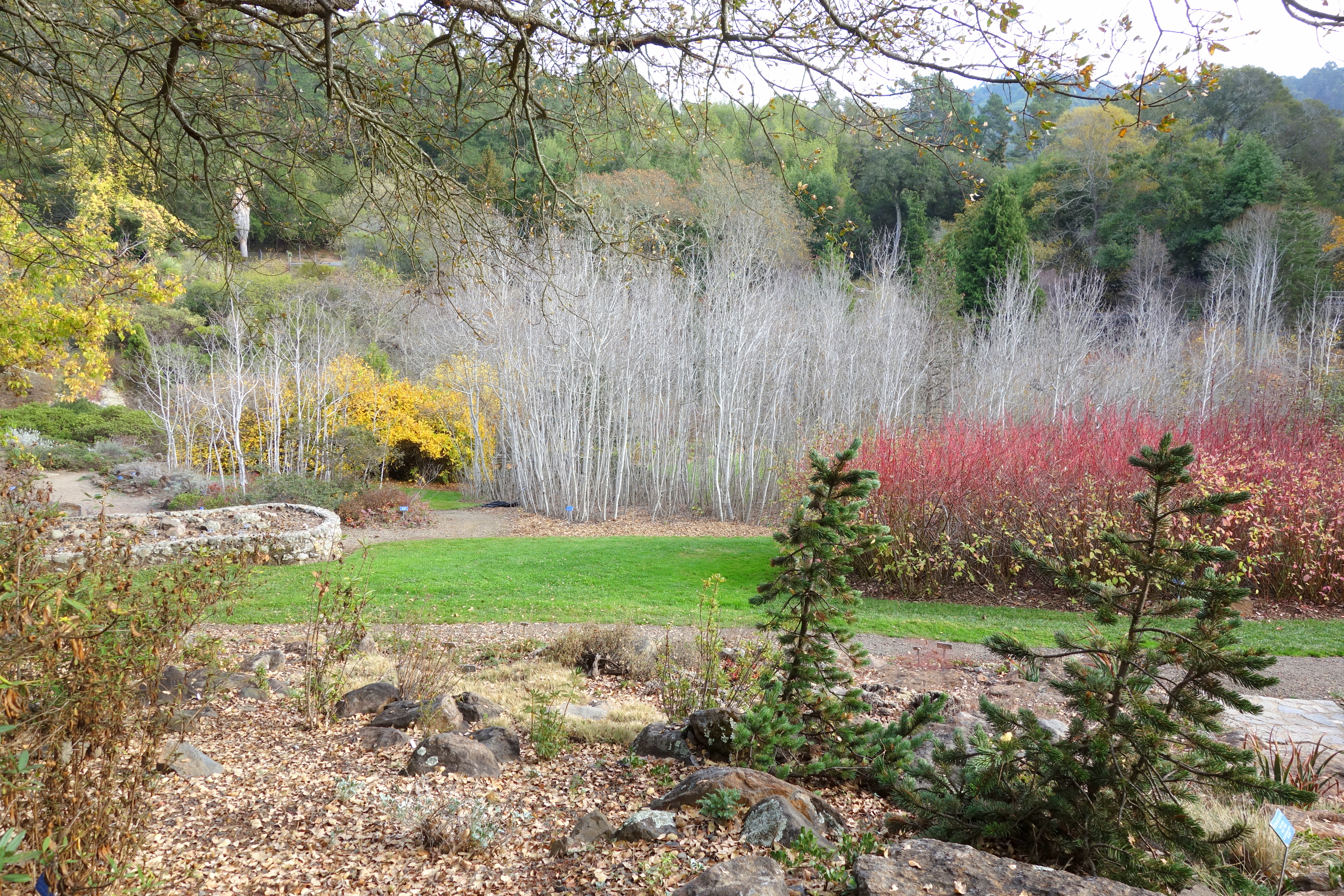
View of the Botanic Garden in November 2013

- Southern California
- Shasta-Klamath
- Valley-Foothill
- Santa Lucia
- Channel Islands
- Sierran
- Redwood
- Sea Bluff
- Pacific Rain Forest
- Franciscan

with subsections:

- Antioch Dunes
- Coastal Dunes
- Pond

Collected plants include:

- silktassels
- manzanitas
- osoberry
- currants
- barberries
- Dutchman's pipe
- fuchsia-flowered gooseberry
- milkmaids
- western leatherwood
- scoliopus
- redbud
- California poppy
- trilliums
- shooting stars
- wallflowers
- fritillarias
- fawn lilies
- rock cress
- pussy willows
- California rose-bay or rhododendron
- woolly blue curls
- ninebark
- mountain spiraea
- summer holly
- ceanothus
- Chinese houses
- irises
- styrax
- blazing star
- monkeyflowers
- fremontias
- carpenteria
- tidy tips
- bush poppies
- brodiaeas
- mariposa tulips
- cacti
- clarkias
- mock orange
- western azalea
- matilija poppy
- fireweed
- ocean spray
- sweet shrub
- columbines
- penstemons
- scarlet mimulus
- buckwheats
- evening primroses
- gums
- larkspur
- lupines
- California fuchsias
- tarweeds
- hibiscus
- helianthus
- snowberries
- madrone
- cottonwoods
- deciduous oaks
- dogwoods
- hawthorn
- willows
- vine maple

== See also ==
- List of botanical gardens in the United States
