= Penitencia Creek =

Creek in California

Upper Penitencia Creek Arroyo de la Penitencia, Encarnacion Arroyo
- Native name: Shistuk (Ohlone)

Location
- Country: United States
- State: California
- Region: Santa Clara County

Physical characteristics
- Source
  - location: Poverty Ridge, Diablo Range
  - coordinates: 37°25′15″N 121°44′12″W
  - elevation: 2,955 ft (901 m)
- Mouth: Coyote Creek
  - location: San Jose, California
  - coordinates: 37°22′03″N 121°52′49″W
  - elevation: 66 ft (20 m)

Basin features
- Tributaries
  - left: Arroyo Aguague

Upper Penitencia Creek is actually one of two creeks by the name Penitencia Creek in the northeastern Santa Clara Valley of Santa Clara County, California. They are both tributaries of Coyote Creek. The upper creek was diverted southwestward, connecting it directly to Coyote Creek ca. 1850 by a farmer to irrigate his fields, permanently splitting Upper Penitencia Creek from Lower Penitencia Creek. Upper Penitencia Creek drains the western slopes of Mount Hamilton of the Diablo Range, and passes through Alum Rock Park, before ending at its confluence with Coyote Creek at Berryessa Road. In December 2018, the San Francisco Estuary Institute published a report commissioned by the Santa Clara Valley Water District to establish a vision for Upper Penitencia Creek's lower four miles focusing on ways "to expand flow conveyance and flood water storage from the Coyote Creek confluence upstream to the Dorel Drive bridge in a manner that works with the existing landscape features and supports habitats for native species".

Lower Penitencia Creek flows along the historic Mission Road between Mission Santa Clara and Mission San Jose. It runs through the city of Milpitas before receiving flows from Berryessa Creek, Piedmont Creek, Arroyo de los Coches, Tularcitos Creek and Calera Creek before entering Coyote Creek near Dixon Landing Road at the southern end of San Francisco Bay.

== History ==
=== Etymology – Ohlone linguistics ===
The Ohlone called the creek Shistuk, meaning "place of rabbits". However, an alternate point of view disputes this name (the Ohlone in all of the documented Ohlone languages the word for rabbit is weren or some variation thereof and therefore, place of rabbits would be Weren-tak); rather the closest word to Shis-tak would be Čéeyiš = jackrabbit in Chocheño, therefore Place of the Jackrabbits (Hares) would be Čéeyiš-tak.

The creek was known as Arroyo de las Penitencia, named after the Penitencia adobe house which stood at the highway and was used as a house of confession and penitence in mission times. Earlier, when Pedro Fages and Father Crespí left Monterey they crossed the Encarnacion Arroyo on November 24, 1769, their mission being to explore up the east side of San Francisco Bay, come round the top below Point Reyes and reach San Francisco.

What is now known as Upper Penitencia Creek was known in the 19th century as Arroyo Aguaje (an aguaje is a spring or watering place; locally variably spelled Aguage or Aguague). A form of the name has been retained by Arroyo Aguague, the principal tributary of Upper Penitencia Creek. The name of Penitencia Creek came into existence at least as early as 1840. At that time the Arroyo Aguague (now referred to as Upper Penitencia Creek) terminated in a sausal (willow grove and freshwater marsh) that flowed in turn into Penitencia Creek (now referred to as Lower Penitencia Creek). When the Arroyo Aguague was diverted in the 1850s to Coyote Creek, it became known as Upper Penitencia Creek.

== Watershed ==
The Upper Penitencia Creek watershed drains an area of 24 square miles (62 km^{2}) and runs approximately 11 miles (18 km) from to its confluence with Coyote Creek, the latter being about 10 miles (16 km) from San Francisco Bay. The source of Upper Penitencia Creek is on Poverty Ridge in the Diablo Range. It plunges into Cherry Flat Reservoir and then flows through Alum Rock Park, where it is joined by Arroyo Aguague. Arroyo Aguague discharges to Penitencia Creek from the south, but summer inflow is very low; however, the stream flows in the Calaveras Fault zone and does not go completely dry, even in severe droughts. Lower down it forms the rough boundary between the Berryessa and Alum Rock districts of San Jose.

Unlike most creeks in the Santa Clara Valley, it follows a mostly natural course and does not have concrete or gabion embankments.

== Ecology ==
Upper Penitencia Creek remains a steelhead trout (Oncorhynchus mykiss) stream and according to two reports may have supported coho salmon (Oncorhynchus kisutch) historically, based on habitat suitability analysis. The Santa Clara Valley Urban Runoff Pollution Prevention Program (SCVURPPP) developed a workplan for watershed analysis in 2006 as the stream was deemed potentially impaired by sediment from anthropogenic activities, this Limiting Factor Analysis reported results from an extensive snorkel sampling effort during spring and fall 2005 which indicated that the watershed supported between 1,300 and 1,500 age 1+ and older steelhead, of which age 2+ and older fish comprised approximately 5 to 10%, from approximately 3.5 miles (5.6 kilometers) upstream of the confluence with Coyote Creek upstream to natural waterfall barriers in Upper Penitencia Creek and Arroyo Aguague. With the exception of the man-made, historic rock baths confining the stream in Alum Rock Park, significant barriers to spawning runs were not identified. Although the structure on Upper Penitencia Creek in Alum Rock Park presents a significant partial barrier to fish passage, an engineering analysis to modify the barrier was completed in 2011. The City of San Jose, in conjunction with the Santa Clara Valley Transportation Authority (VTA) are planning to remove this barrier, a concrete weir related to the historic Youth Science Institute bridge, along with three other stream restoration projects with $2.5 million in funding from VTA as mitigation for environmental damages related to other VTA construction. The project is scheduled for completion in October, 2012.

In dry summers the creek goes dry about one mile below Alum Rock Park. Flows are diverted by the Santa Clara Valley Water District (SCVWD) to three off-channel percolation ponds at Noble Avenue, which in turn, recharge creek flows for about two miles below the ponds through the summer. However the diversion is also capable of drying the stream in late spring which may interfere with outmigrating steelhead smolts.

A Bay Area-wide study of which watersheds had the greatest potential for restoration for steelhead trout populations identified three streams in Santa Clara County: Upper Penitencia Creek, Stevens Creek and the Guadalupe River.

== Penitencia Creek Trail and recreation ==
Penitencia Creek Trail follows some of the upper creek: it begins unpaved at Noble Avenue in the east, passes percolation ponds which are open to the public, goes unofficially under Piedmont Road, becomes paved through Penitencia Creek Park, passes under Interstate 680, and ends in the far end of Penitencia Creek County Park at the Berryessa BART station. On October 25, 2008, a dedication ceremony was held to designate the trail as part of the Bay Area Ridge Trail network, where it would provide a gateway to Alum Rock Park and the Boccardo Trail, which are parts of the Ridge Trail. It will someday connect to Coyote Creek, which will provide access to the San Francisco Bay Trail.

Upper Penitencia Creek is closed to fishing year-round to protect the trout population.

== See also ==
- Alum Rock Park
- Alum Rock, California
- Berryessa, San Jose, California
- List of watercourses in the San Francisco Bay Area
