= Fuchsia-flowered gooseberry =

Fuchsia-flowered gooseberry is a common name for two gooseberry species with showy flowers native to western North America:

- Ribes lobbii, native to northern California and the Pacific Northwest
- Ribes speciosum, native to coastal central and southern California, Baja California and also in the foothills around San Jose. It tends to grows in full or nearly full shade, and in slightly moister spots such as north-facing slopes, slope bottoms or near natural drainages.
