= Santa Clara Valley Open Space Authority =

Independent special district in California

- OSA
- Established: February 1, 1993

The Santa Clara Valley Open Space Authority (OSA) is an independent special district in Santa Clara County, California, U.S. A bill signed by Governor Wilson in 1992, SB2027, created the district as the Santa Clara County Open Space Preserve as of February 1, 1993. In 2015, Governor Jerry Brown signed California Senate Bill SB422 to rename the authority with "Valley" instead of "County." The OSA serves areas of the county outside the Midpeninsula Regional Open Space District with the exception of Gilroy. The OSA uses $4.2 million per year from a $12-per-parcel property-tax assessment to hire open space technicians and to open land to the public.

The Open Space Authority currently owns or manages the following public open space preserves:

- Sierra Vista Open Space Preserve
- Coyote Valley Open Space Preserve
- Máyyan ‘Ooyákma –Coyote Ridge Open Space Preserve
- Rancho Cañada del Oro Open Space Preserve

Mission: The Santa Clara Valley Open Space Authority conserves the natural environment, supports agriculture, and connects people to nature, by protecting open spaces, natural areas, and working farms and ranches for future generations.
