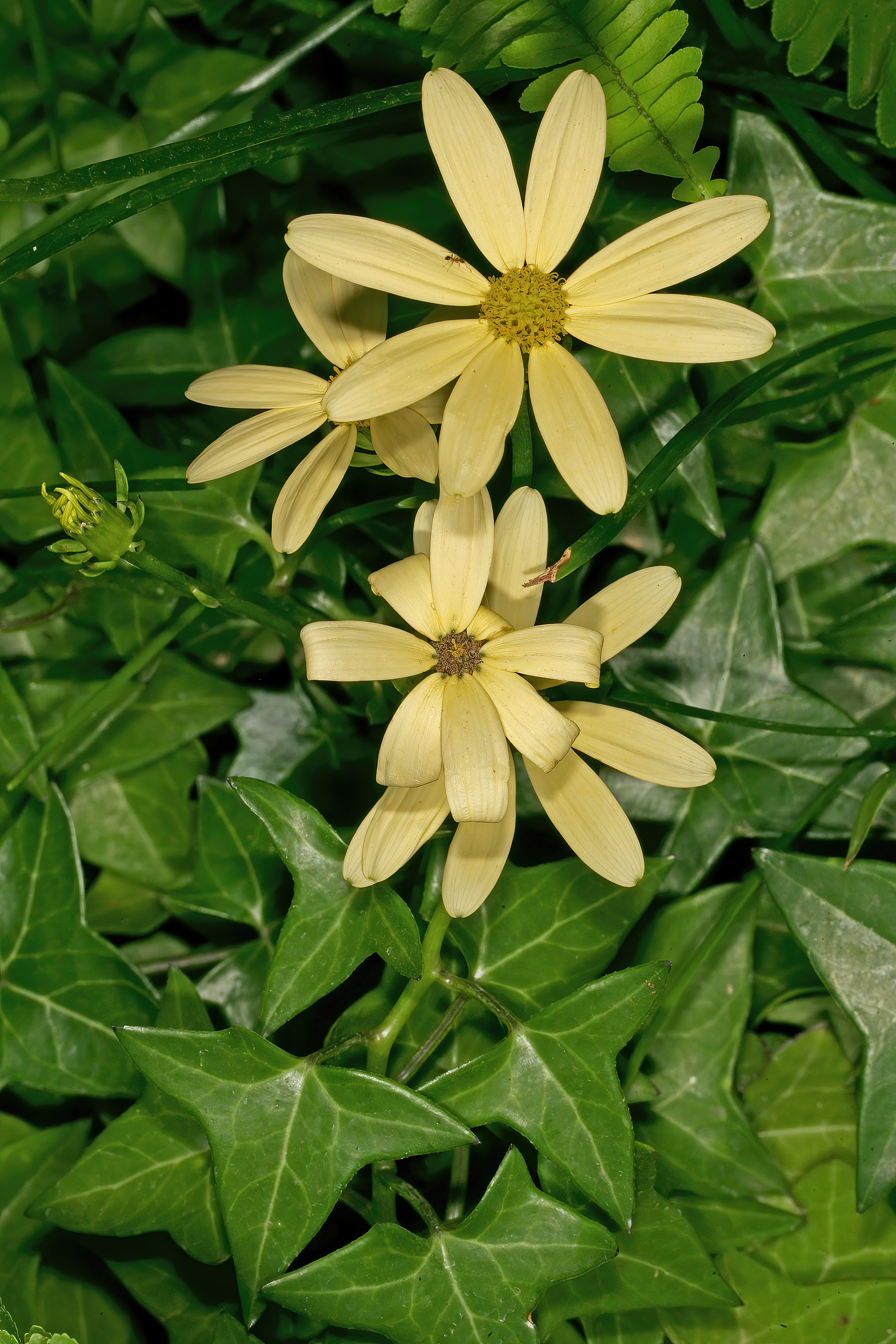

Scientific classification
- Kingdom: Plantae
- Clade: Tracheophytes
- Clade: Angiosperms
- Clade: Eudicots
- Clade: Asterids
- Order: Asterales
- Family: Asteraceae
- Genus: Senecio
- Species: S. macroglossus

Binomial name
- Senecio macroglossus DC.

= Senecio macroglossus =

Species of flowering plant

Senecio macroglossus, the Natal ivy, marguerite ivy, climbing senecio or wax ivy, is a species of flowering plant in the family Asteraceae, native to southern Africa, from Zimbabwe and Mozambique to eastern South Africa.

== Name ==
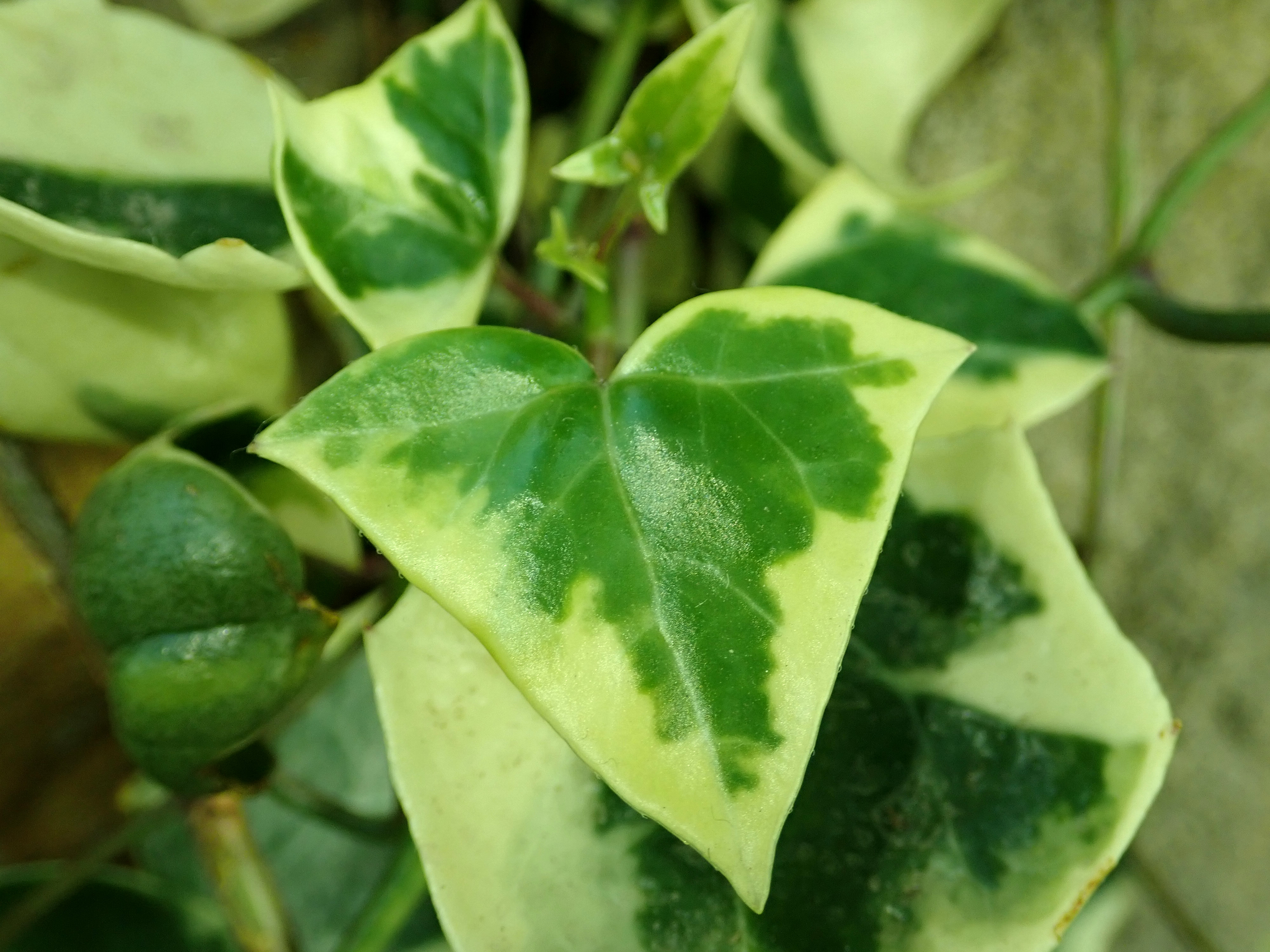
'Variegatus'

Despite its common name, and its resemblance to common ivy, it is not closely related to that group of plants. The Latin specific epithet macroglossus means "large tongue".

== Description ==
Growing to 3 m (10 ft) or more, it is an evergreen climber with waxy triangular leaves to 8 cm (3 in) long.

Single, yellow, daisy-like composite flowerheads are borne in summer.

== Cultivation ==
With a minimum temperature of 5–7 °C (41–45 °F), it is frequently grown as a houseplant in temperate regions. Numerous cultivars have been developed, of which 'Variegatus', with cream-coloured leaf margins, has gained the Royal Horticultural Society's Award of Garden Merit.
