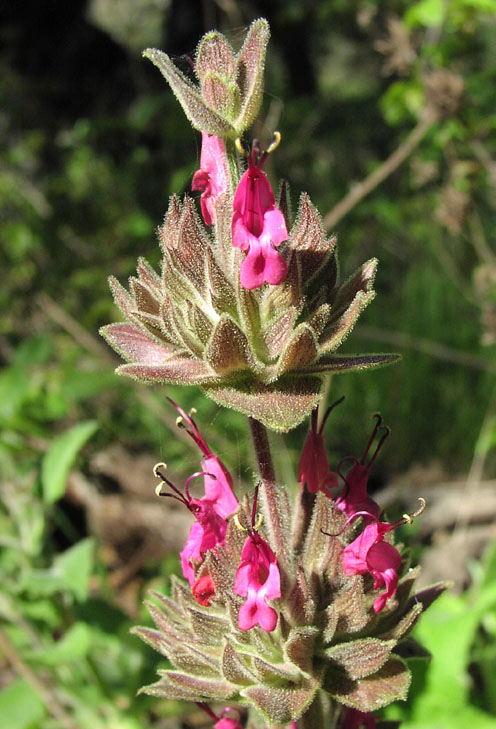
- Salvia spathacea, Gaviota State Park, California

Conservation status
- Apparently Secure (NatureServe)

Scientific classification
- Kingdom: Plantae
- Clade: Tracheophytes
- Clade: Angiosperms
- Clade: Eudicots
- Clade: Asterids
- Order: Lamiales
- Family: Lamiaceae
- Genus: Salvia
- Species: S. spathacea

Binomial name
- Salvia spathacea Greene

= Salvia spathacea =

Species of flowering plant

Salvia spathacea, the California hummingbird sage or pitcher sage, is a species of flowering plant in the family Lamiaceae, native to southern and central California growing from sea level to 610 m (2,001 ft). This fruity scented sage blooms in March to May with typically dark rose-lilac colored flowers. It is cultivated in gardens for its attractive flowering spikes and pleasant scent.

== Distribution ==
The pitcher sage is found in the California coast ranges from the Sacramento Valley south to the San Diego area. It is a common species that grows on open or shady slopes in moist oak woodland, chaparral, and coastal sage scrub not far from the Pacific Ocean.

== Description ==
Salvia spathacea is an evergreen perennial with flowering stems growing from a woody base, 30–150 cm (12–59 in) tall. When not flowering plants grow less than 50 cm (20 in) tall, forming clumps of sprawling foliage. Each plant produces a single flowering stem which rarely branches. It spreads by rhizomes and can form colonies up to 130 cm (51 in) in diameter. Like many species in the mint family it has very pronounced square stems, and the entire plant is covered with wavy glandular hairs.

Its bright green leaves are 8–20 cm. long, and highly aromatic when crushed or touched. They are oblong to almost arrowhead-shaped at the base, and can be puckered with wrinkles, and have rounded teeth at the leaf edges. Like the rest of the plant, they are covered with hairs which make the plant soft to the touch. The hairs tend to be denser on the bottom surface of the leaves.

The flowers are produced in clustered whorled inflorescences 15–30 cm (6–12 in) long and 6 cm in diameter on spike-like stems with each node on the top half of the stem having flowers. The inflorescences are subtended by showy bracts which can be ruby red to dark maroon or brown. The calyx is 1.5 to 3 cm. long. It is two-lipped, with the upper lip entire, or unlobed. Each corolla is tubular and 2.5-3.5 cm. long, with 2 lips. The upper lip of the corolla is 7–8 mm., with two shallow lobes, while the lower lip is longer, 10–12 mm. The two fertile stamens are attached to the corolla tube. The style is forked. Both the style and the stamens protrude outside the corolla tube. Flowers vary in color from green through light pink and magenta to purple.

The fruits are 4 nutlets, dark brown to black in color. They are round to ovate, with a length of 3.5 to 6.5 mm.

== Cultivation ==
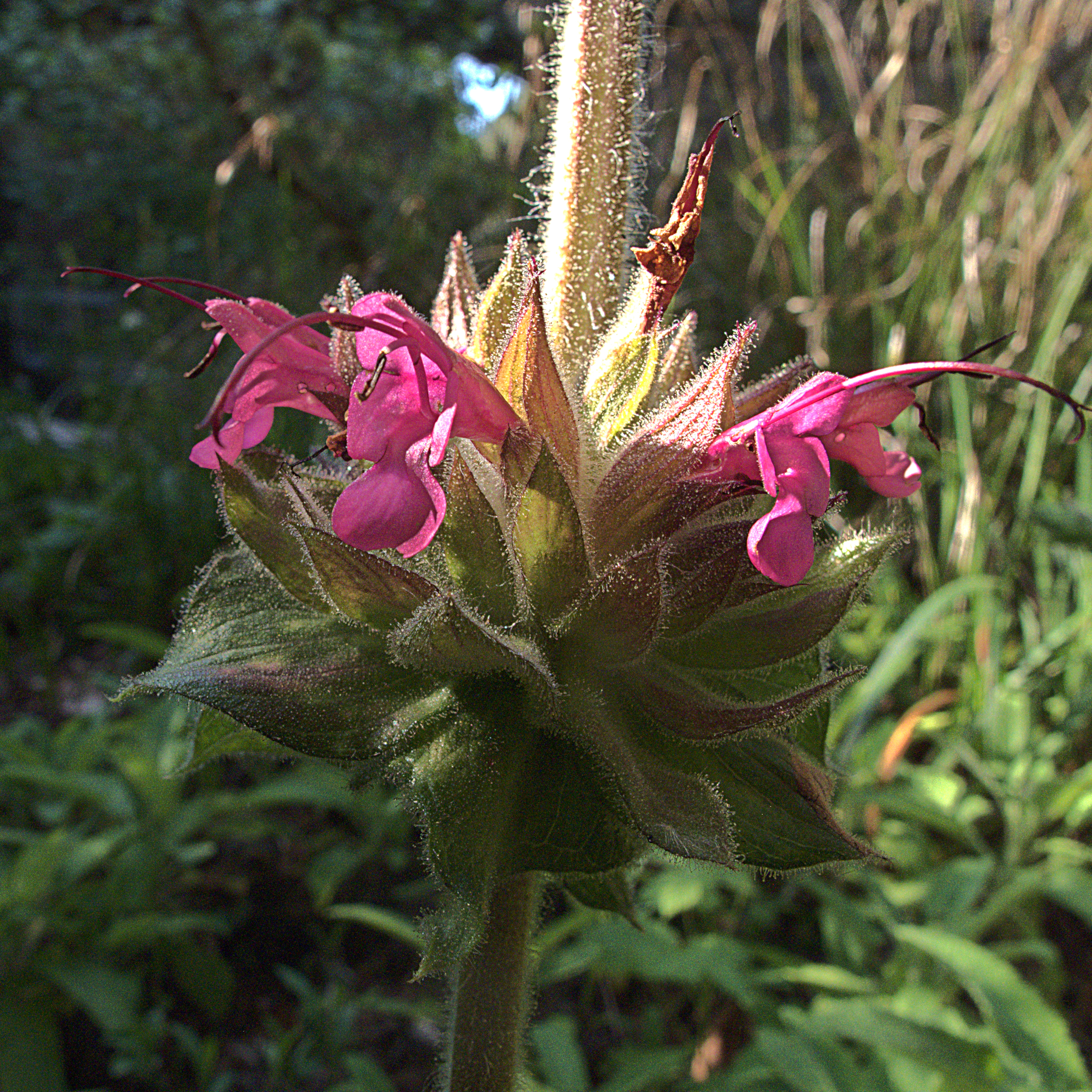
Salvia spathacea closeup. W. L. Jepson wrote in "The Flora of California" : "The folk generally admire its form, but even sedate botanists remember its richness of color and a certain opulence of habit in contrast with its chaparral habitat."

Salvia spathacea is easy to grow in the garden, and is a very useful groundcover for dry shade under oaks. Unlike other California native sages, it spreads from underground rhizomes. It will also grow in the open, in ordinary garden soil, in part or even full sun. Supplemental water can help encourage a longer flowering season, but a late summer rest from watering is desirable. As the alternative common name suggests, it is used by feeding hummingbirds and will attract them to the garden. Deer and gophers generally leave this strongly aromatic plant alone.

It easily propagates by seeds or rhizomes. Seeds should be collected as early as possible, or they can be predated by insects. S. spathacea can get powdery mildew, which can be treated with a spray of milk diluted in water. Several cultivars exist although some selections are stronger than others. One showy cultivar is "Confetti," which has both yellow and pink flowers on the same plant. The more robust cultivars include "Powerline Pink," with magenta to crimson flowers, which will grow in hot sun, even inland, and "Avis Keedy," which has light yellow flowers.

Salvia spathacea has gained the Royal Horticultural Society's Award of Garden Merit.
