= California fuchsia =

Plant set index article

Californian fuchsia or California fuchsia may refer to one of two plant species:

- Epilobium canum, species of willowherb in the evening primrose family
- Ribes speciosum, species of flowering plant in the family Grossulariaceae
